= Dan Miodownik =

Israeli political scientist

- Born: 1966 (age 59–60); Buenos Aires, Argentina
- Awards: Alon Fellowship (2008)

Academic background
- Education: Tel Aviv University; University of Pennsylvania
- Thesis: (2005)
- Doctoral advisor: Ian Lustick

Academic work
- Discipline: Political science
- Website: danmiodownik.huji.ac.il

Dan Miodownik (born 1966) is an Israeli political scientist. He is a professor in the departments of political science and international relations at the Hebrew University of Jerusalem, where he holds the Max Kampelman Chair in Democracy and Human Rights.

His research concerns intrastate conflict and political violence, including civil war, ethnic conflict, the long-term effects of historical violence, and the politics of ethnically mixed cities. He combines surveys, experiments and fieldwork with agent-based modelling and geographic information systems.

== Early life ==
Miodownik was born in Buenos Aires, Argentina, to Shmuel, who worked in the textile industry, and Aida, a physiotherapist. Both parents were born in Buenos Aires and were active in the Maccabi organisation in Argentina; their own parents had emigrated to Argentina from Poland and Lithuania in the 1920s and 1930s. He attended the Sholem Aleichem kindergarten in the city.

In 1972 he immigrated to Israel with his parents and his brother Gabi. The family first lived in an absorption centre in Lod and later moved to Bat Yam, where he attended the Herzl elementary school and the Shazar high school. He took an interest in politics from an early age and was active in the Ratz party.

== Education and political work ==
Miodownik completed a bachelor's degree in political science and international relations at Tel Aviv University in 1991. Alongside it he took courses in Jewish history and in cinema, subjects he had considered studying before settling on political science.

In his final undergraduate semester he began working as a parliamentary aide in the Knesset, first for the Ratz (political party) faction and later with member of the Knesset Binyamin Temkin. In 1993 he became the faction's spokesperson, and after the factions merged he was one of the spokespeople for Meretz. He then served as spokesperson for Peace Now, and in 1996 left political work to complete his master's degree.

He completed the master's degree, with a concentration in political communication, at Tel Aviv University in 1997. His thesis examined the boundaries of Zionist political discourse in Israel through the writings of the journalist Mordechai Stein.

He received his PhD in comparative politics and international relations from the University of Pennsylvania in 2005, supervised by Ian Lustick. From 2001 to 2005 he was a research fellow at the university's Solomon Asch Center for the Study of Ethnopolitical Conflict, and in 2005–2006 a postdoctoral fellow at the School of Political Science at the University of Haifa.

His dissertation, "The Emergence of Demands for Regional Autonomy: Computer Simulation and European Evaluation", asked why movements for regional autonomy arise. Its central concern was how decentralisation and grants of autonomy affect ethnoregional mobilisation, a question he returned to in later work, and he examined it through agent-based simulation alongside European cases.

== Career ==
Miodownik joined the Hebrew University of Jerusalem in 2006 as a lecturer on the tenure track, and was promoted to senior lecturer in 2011, associate professor in 2016 and full professor in 2023. He is a member of both the department of political science and the department of international relations.

He was an honorary fellow at the University of Wisconsin–Madison in 2011–2012 and a visiting scholar at the University of Pennsylvania in 2012–2013. In 2023–2024 he was a guest scientist at the Center for Interdisciplinary Peace and Conflict Research at the Free University of Berlin, and he is an affiliated fellow of the peace and conflict studies unit at the university's Otto Suhr Institute.

At the Hebrew University he directed the Leonard Davis Institute for International Relations from 2015 to 2021 and the Levi Eshkol Institute from 2020 to 2023, served as associate dean for research in the faculty of social sciences from 2019 to 2023, and sat on the university senate from 2018 to 2021. He is a research fellow at the Harry S. Truman Research Institute for the Advancement of Peace and executive editor of Politika.

In September 2023 he became the second holder of the Max Kampelman Chair in Democracy and Human Rights, established in 2002; the first holder was the political theorist Avner de-Shalit.

In 2008 he received a three-year Alon Fellowship for outstanding young researchers from the Israeli Council for Higher Education. His research has been funded by the Israel Science Foundation and by the European Union's EuropeAid programme.

== Research ==
=== Agent-based modelling ===
Miodownik's early work, much of it with Ian Lustick, used agent-based modelling to formulate political theory. In a 2002 article the two argued that identities are not fixed attributes that individuals bring into politics, but can become institutionalised through repeated adaptation at the individual level and produce durable effects at the system level.

A 2004 article in the American Political Science Review, with Lustick and Roy J. Eidelson, used simulation to test the proposition that power sharing suppresses secessionism. The authors reported the opposite possibility: such arrangements can strengthen the organisational capacity of minority groups and encourage demands for separation.

He has also written on the methods of computational social science, presenting simulations as explicit theoretical constructions rather than scale models of reality, and treating the replication of models and their re-implementation in new computational environments as a scientific problem in its own right.

=== Ethnic conflict and civil war ===
Much of Miodownik's work argues that structural variables such as ethnic diversity, natural resources, age structure and decentralisation do not affect violence uniformly, and that their consequences depend on further conditions.

A 2010 article with Britt Cartrite, developing a central line from his dissertation, used simulation to test competing claims about the effect of decentralisation on ethnopolitical mobilisation. The authors reported a non-linear effect: weak and moderate decentralisation raise the likelihood of mobilisation, while strong decentralisation lowers it. They attributed this to the way minority control of regional institutions shapes group identity and the frustration of group members.

In a 2009 article with Ravi Bhavnani he argued that the relationship between ethnic polarisation and civil war depends on the salience of ethnic identity, so that the same aggregate ethnic structure can produce different outcomes where ethnicity is weakly activated. Their work on ethnic minority rule reached a similar conclusion, reporting that minority rule is not inherently destabilising and that its effects vary with fiscal policy and a state's natural-resource profile.

A 2016 article with Omer Yair examined the youth bulge hypothesis and found that a country's share of young adults helps explain non-ethnic civil wars but not ethnic ones. With Lilach Nir he proposed perceived horizontal inequalities as an individual-level mechanism linking social structure to receptivity to violence.

A 2015 article in International Organization, with Guy Grossman and Devorah Manekin, examined attitudes to war and peace among Israeli ex-combatants and reported that combat service was associated with greater support for political compromise.

In 2014 he edited, with Oren Barak, the volume Nonstate Actors in Intrastate Conflicts.

=== Long-term legacies of violence ===
In two 2023 articles with Amiad Haran Diman, Miodownik examined how violence during the 1948 Arab–Israeli War affected voting in Israel decades later. An article in the Journal of Conflict Resolution reported that Palestinian villages in Israel more severely affected by the war showed a higher vote share for Jewish parties seventy years on, which the authors attributed to vulnerability and risk aversion among communities that survived in place, as distinct from those displaced. An article in Comparative Political Studies reported that Jewish communities established on land taken from Palestinians were more likely to vote for right-wing parties over time.

The two also examined the relationship between social cohesion and outbreaks of rioting in East Jerusalem.

=== Urban politics and Jerusalem ===
From the 2010s his research turned to ethnically mixed cities, and to Jerusalem in particular. A 2014 article in the American Journal of Political Science, with Bhavnani, Karsten Donnay, Maayan Mor and Dirk Helbing, examined the relationship between spatial segregation and urban violence, and a 2018 article with Jonathan Rokem and Chagai M. Weiss analysed the spatial logic of intergroup violence in Jerusalem.

His work on East Jerusalem concerns relations between Palestinian residents and municipal institutions. A 2022 study of community councils in the eastern part of the city described a condition of limited urban citizenship, and later work introduced the term "flexible compliance" for residents' pragmatic use of authorities whose legitimacy they do not fully accept.

A later study moved beyond the Israeli case: a 2025 article in the European Journal of Political Research used surveys in six European cities to examine the relationship between urban and national identity.

In 2023 he edited, with Gillad Rosen, a special issue of Politika on Jerusalem. In August 2023 he published an opinion piece in Ynet opposing the removal of higher education funding from the Israeli government's five-year plan for East Jerusalem, arguing that research did not support the claim that study at Israeli institutions radicalises Palestinian students.

== Personal life ==
Miodownik is married to Lilach Nir, a professor in the departments of political science and communication at the Hebrew University.

== Selected publications ==
- Nonstate Actors in Intrastate Conflicts (edited with Oren Barak), University of Pennsylvania Press, 2014
- "Secessionism in Multicultural States: Does Sharing Power Prevent or Encourage It?" (with Ian Lustick and Roy J. Eidelson), American Political Science Review 98(2), 2004
- "Ethnic Polarization, Ethnic Salience, and Civil War" (with Ravi Bhavnani), Journal of Conflict Resolution 53(1), 2009
- "Does Political Decentralization Exacerbate or Ameliorate Ethnopolitical Mobilization?" (with Britt Cartrite), Political Research Quarterly 63(4), 2010
- "Group Segregation and Urban Violence" (with Bhavnani, Donnay, Mor and Helbing), American Journal of Political Science 58(1), 2014
- "The Political Legacies of Combat" (with Guy Grossman and Devorah Manekin), International Organization 69(4), 2015
- "Legacies of Survival: Historical Violence and Ethnic Minority Behavior" (with Amiad Haran Diman), Journal of Conflict Resolution 68(7–8), 2023
- "Bloody Pasts and Current Politics" (with Amiad Haran Diman), Comparative Political Studies 57(9), 2023
