= Tax break =

Any item that avoids taxes

Tax break also known as tax preferences, tax concession, and tax relief, are a method of reduction to the tax liability of taxpayers. Government usually applies them to stimulate the economy and increase the solvency of the population. By this fiscal policy act, government favourable behaving of population sample or general behaving. By announcing a new tax break state budget possibly deprecate some of their revenues from collecting taxes. On the other hand, a new tax break stimulates the economy of subjects in the state, which could possibly strengthen the increase of outcomes that will be taxed. Every tax break must go through the legislative system to be accepted by authorized institutions to become valid. Most of the countries pledge this position to the ministry of finance, which approves new tax breaks as tax law. Whether for validation is needed an agreement with other constitutional officials depends on state legislative. However, in the same manner, could the tax break be annulled. In many cases tax break is announced with a limitation factor, which restricts the maximum use of this tax break. For example, a tax credit is given for purchases of electric cars. The tax credit should deprecate 10% from purchases, but the limiting factor is 500$, which can’t be exceeded.

The tax break is utilized for numerous potential aims. One of the majors is to provide the low-income class with more assurances. More income obtained by tax breaks could potentially provide this population fragment with a greater proportion of welfare. Otherwise, tax breaks are commonly used to promote education, the environment, health care, unemployed, but even to support eco-farming. Volunteering activities, religions, and local political parties are mostly excluded from tax liability.

Some of the tax breaks could be obtained by passive acting. But most of them require some active acting to obtain them. For diverse tax breaks obtaining is variously complicated. It unfolds from legislative and current law focused on a tax break. Frequently tax break is obtained after a request sends to the authorized institution, which could confirm, refuse, or send a request back for redraft. As well it depends on the type of tax break. One type could remove full tax liability but commonly mean exclusion tax. Another type is decline liability of subject and in an extreme case is untaxable minimum. That excludes taxes, which will collect that small amounts of money, that neither levy tax won’t be paid by this collected amount. Some objects could be fully released from taxes. That occurs in a nonstandard situation such as local catastrophe, paralysis, or death major member of the household. The tax break, which is abundantly used is social security income relief, while individuals are in retirement years. Tax exemptions for citizens, which live or work abroad are also significantly represented in the tax break framework. Otherwise, frequent tax exemption aims at most common taxes as income tax rate, Social Security Tax, corporate income tax, and excise tax. Highly beneficial tax breaks are entirely eliminated certain types of income from the return. These types are applying to certain taxpayers as one entity. A new tax break in some cases prevents from shifting the tax burden to tax heavens.

== Forms of tax breaks ==
1. Tax deduction - Tax deduction is a reduction of gross income. That in result reduce the size of taxable income. Tax deductions are a form of tax incentives. The UK government's budget in March 2021 created a "super-deduction", whereby companies could claim 130% capital allowances on certain types of plant and machinery investment.

2. Tax credits - Tax credits are a form of tax incentive, which allows taxpayers to subtract the amount directly owe on taxes to the state. Besides tax deductions that curtail taxes, the tax credit is directly deducted from the amount of money owed to the government. The value of tax credit depends on the type of credit. Non-refundable credits could possibly increase owned tax to zero, but no overlap will be paid to the subject backward. On the other hand, refundable and partier refundable provide taxpayers with an opportunity to obtain overlap money. Tax credits are frequently used to support taxpayers to promote favorable behaving.

3. Tax exemption - Tax exemption is frequently used to support specific organizations or subjects by removing subject liability to make compulsory payment. Often use to subsidize charitable and non – profitable organizations and charity events. It may provide these subjects with complete relief from taxes or reduces tax rates.

4. Deducting items from tax - Taxpayers can exclude some items from their tax liability. These items are defined by tax law and they can be standard or nonstandard. Standard express exact items and amount, which could be excluded. Nonstandard is defined indirect and just reveal formula how to compute them. Particular items are in vast general frameworks.

5. Tax sales - Tax sale is a reduction in the amount owed to the government, which subsequently reduce the total tax liability of individuals. The sale could be absolute or relative. The absolute sale gives the specific size of the sale, which will be dedicated after the entity fulfills predetermined conditions. However, relative sales express general formula how to calculate sale, but do not give specific cases.

6. Tax returns - Tax returns are when government repays indirect taxes if it determines that the tax would place a disproportionate burden on taxpayers.

7. Reduction tax rate - This tax break define possibilities to reduce tax rates upon items, income, and so on. The general tax rate impacts all entities on which applies tax law. However, reduce the tax rate reduces the tax liability of some products, which will make them available to more consumers. Mainly used for necessities.

== Implications of tax breaks ==
Government should consider all potential pros and cons in advance of adopting a new tax break. The effective use of tax relief should be a consideration whether it is a long-term or short-term change. Some tax breaks, such as the immediate abolition of the tax during a natural disaster, are short-term. At the moment, the affected parts of the country may be very effective, but they are not designed for long-term assistance. On the contrary, other tax reliefs are created with the aim of supporting economic growth or greater equality in the population in the long run. For making the right decisions government should consider current situations in the local and global economy to prevent potential losses. Important is also to promote and medialize new tax breaks, that enough citizens will know about them. Hence when this aspect would be underestimated result as it was predicted in advance will change. This example will reveal one case of potential inequality after announcing a new tax break. The government in state X adopts a new tax break, which dedicates 1% from the purchase of a new electric car. By a computing citizen of state A, which purchase an electric car for 200, 000 $ and with a new tax break he would save 2000 $. On the other hand, citizen B of state X bought the car for 20,000 $. That prevents him from 200 $. By percental this amount equals, but in total effect, it promotes richer citizens more. As it appears economically stronger subjects will be ultimately more beneficially impacted by the new tax breaks. This problem incorporates horizontal inequality and vertical inequality. Horizontal inequalities occur between groups with different identities by paying taxes. Vertical, which favor economically stronger or weaker population fragments.
