= Ruth Manzanares =

Peruvian engineer

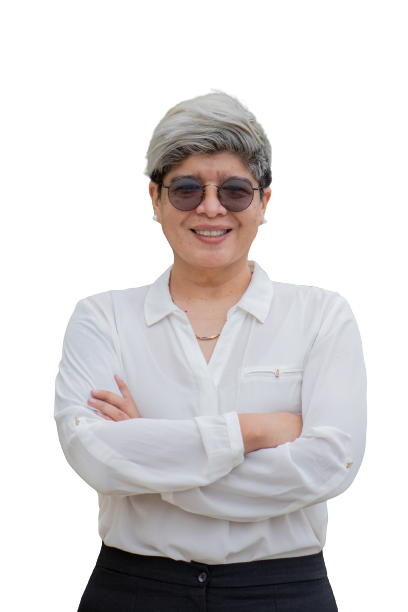
- Born: Ruth Aracelis Manzanares Grados; 1978 (age 47–48); Lima, Peru
- Education: Pontifical Catholic University of Peru
- Known for: Inventions
- Awards: Jesco von Puttkamer International; Korea International Women's Invention Exposition (KIWIE)
- Website: ruthmanzanares.com

Ruth Aracelis Manzanares Grados (born 1978) is a Peruvian mechanical engineer, researcher, inventor and professor, known for her achievements in science, technology, engineering and mathematics. She's considered one of the most prestigious inventors in Peru.

== Early years and education ==
Ruth Manzanares was born in Lima in 1978. She was admitted at the Pontifical Catholic University of Peru, studying industrial engineering at first but then changing to Mechanical Engineering, obtaining a bachelor's degree in that field. At the same time, she started her technical education in Automotive Mechanics at Senati. Winning the DAAD scholarship, her thesis was completed at the Chemnitz University of Technology, Germany.

Ruth earned a master's degree in Automotive Engineering from Monterrey Institute of Technology and Higher Education, Toluca campus in Mexico, through two excellence scholarships. Additionally, she holds a master's degree in Strategic Business Management from Centrum PUCP, and an international master's in Leadership from the School of Senior Management and Administration (EADA) in Barcelona, Spain.

She is currently pursuing a Ph.D. in Strategic Management at Consortium of Universities (Pontifical Catholic University of Peru, Universidad del Pacifico, Cayetano Heredia University, and University of Lima).

== Career ==
At the beginning of her career, she worked in sectors such as metalworking, construction and energy. She began teaching in 2010 at the Monterrey Institute of Technology and Higher Education and, since 2012 in Peru, has taught classes in mechanical engineering, mechatronics, agriculture and industrial design at various universities, both undergraduate and graduate.

Since 2021, she works as a research lecturer at the Northern Private University, where she leads the Research Headquarters of the Faculty of Architecture and Design, within the Research, Innovation and Sustainability Directorate. She is also the founder and coordinator of the Research Group on Applied Innovation in Product and Service Design (GIADIPS).

== Patents ==
Manzanares holds over 15 patents. One is the "Steam Nurse project" – patented in Spain and Peru – an electronic locker designed to disinfect nurses' uniforms using steam and UV light, presented in the Global Grad Show 2020, in Dubai, where it gained popularity. Other invention is "Titanum", a utility-fertilizer pen made from pacay peel, which aims to reduce environmental contamination. She has also created "Boli, the ladybug", a robot designed to monitor and analyze farmland, providing optimal results for farmers. This device measures parameters such as temperature, humidity, and soil salinity, and detects pests and heavy metals, enhancing crop quality and export potential.

== Publications ==
In 2021, the conference paper "Design of an Automatic System of an Accelerated Biogas Biodigester for Rural Areas in Peru" was published. This research presents the design and control of a biodigester with mechatronic systems and a closed cylinder-piston compression system to accelerate biogas generation using livestock waste. The system operates mechanically to address limited electricity access in rural areas, providing a sustainable energy source that reduces pollution and health risks from traditional fuels.

In 2023, she published Identifying disappeared historic buildings of port of Callao using georeferencing, where she uses photogrammetry software and Geographic Information Systems (GIS) to analyze the Real Felipe Fortress structure and determine the nature of an atypical construction within the fortress. The location of the defensive wall of the ancient city of Callao and its first churches, which were destroyed by the 1746 earthquake and tsunami – the worst recorded in the history of Peru and South America – was identified.

Ruth has also published numerous conference papers, including "Mechatronic Design of a Myoelectric and Mechanomyographic Prosthesis with Intelligent Control for the Control of the Grip Function in People with Wrist Disarticulation and Transradial Amputation", which focuses on designing a myoelectric and mechanomyographic prosthesis to control grip functions through intelligent control. The project aims to improve the quality of life for people with wrist disarticulation and transradial amputation in countries with limited access to advanced prostheses.

== Awards and honours ==
She won the Semi Grand Prize at the Korea International Women's Invention Exposition (KIWIE) 2020, becoming the first Peruvian female engineer inventor to receive this award. She also received the Outstanding Invention Award from the International Federation of Inventors' Associations, being the first Peruvian researcher to achieve this recognition. Indecopi recognized her as the Peruvian inventor with the highest number of submitted patents, 25, in 2021. In 2022, she earned 16 medals at KIWIE, making her the only Latin American inventor with the highest number of awards.

As the leader of Team DEIMOS, she won the Jesco von Puttkamer International Team Award in NASA's Human Exploration Rover Challenge in 2018. She also received the Medal of the Lima Departmental Council – College of Engineers of Peru (CIP) 2022 in recognition of her career.

In 2024, she was recognized by the President of Peru as one of the 12 women leaders of Peru at the cultural event "Women Leading Development in Equality". She was featured in the publication Peruvian Inventors: Empowering to Innovate with Courage by Indecopi, and in the book Women in the Bicentennial: Women in Knowledge by WomenCEO Peru and Alafarpe.

That same year, Manzanares was honored as an Illustrious Woman by EMILIMA of the Municipality of Lima and the Women's Museum Foundation. Her contributions were also highlighted on the "Aprendo en Casa" educational platform by Minedu as a Peruvian inventor.

Ruth Manzanares has also appeared in schools and organizations talking about being a female engineer and empowering women to pursue STEM careers. She has been motivating students to get RENACYT recognition and promoting the culture of patenting inventions.
