= Menachem Katz =

- Born: 1955 (age 70–71); Bratislava, Czechoslovakia
- Education: Hebrew University of Jerusalem, Bar-Ilan University
- Occupations: Talmudic scholar, Digital humanities expert
- Known for: Critical edition of the Jerusalem Talmud
- Parent: Eliyahu Katz
- Relatives: Aharon Katz (brother)

Menachem Katz (born 1955) is an Israeli Talmudic scholar whose work focuses on the Jerusalem Talmud and digital humanities. He has been involved in the editing of digital critical editions of both the Babylonian Talmud and the Jerusalem Talmud.

== Early life and education ==
Katz was born in Bratislava, Czechoslovakia, and immigrated to Israel in 1969. His father, Rabbi Eliyahu Katz, served as Chief Rabbi of Bratislava and later of Beersheba, and was a member of the Chief Rabbinate Council of Israel. His brother, Rabbi Aharon Katz, served as a judge on the Supreme Rabbinical Court of Israel. He was named after his great-grandfather, Rabbi Menachem Katz-Prostitz.

He completed his undergraduate and graduate studies at the Hebrew University of Jerusalem, where he studied Talmud and Jewish Thought. He later received his doctoral degree from Bar-Ilan University, with a dissertation on the tractate of Kiddushin in the Jerusalem Talmud, supervised by Daniel Sperber.

== Career ==
In 2016, Katz published a critical edition of tractate Qiddushin in the Jerusalem Talmud, described as the first published critical edition of a tractate from that corpus.

He has held academic positions including senior lecturer at Efrata College of Education, where he served as head of the Department of Oral Law, and at Open University of Israel. He has additionally worked as a research fellow at the University of Haifa.

Katz founded the Shiluvim Institute at Yeshivat HaKibbutz HaDati and has been involved in activities at the Open University's Hub for Digital Humanities and Social Sciences.

He has participated in digital humanities initiatives related to Talmudic texts, including serving as academic director of the Friedberg Genizah Project project. He has also been involved in the development of a digital critical edition of the Jerusalem Talmud, supported by grants from the Israel Science Foundation.

== Selected publications ==
=== Books ===
- Jerusalem Talmud Tractate Qiddushin: Critical Edition and a Short Explanation, Jerusalem: Yad Ben-Zvi & Schechter Institute of Jewish Studies Press, 2016.
- R. Saul Lieberman, Hayerushalmi Kipshuto: A Commentary, Part 1, 3rd ed. [edited by Menachem Katz], 2008.

=== Articles ===
- "Talmud Yerushalmi Digital Critical Edition" (with H. Gershuni, Y. Bar), Proceedings of the 18th Italian Research Conference on Digital Libraries, 2022. Full text
- "Aleinu – A Prayer Common to Jews and Gentile God-Fearers", in Judaism’s Challenge: Election, Divine Love and Human Enmity, ed. Alon Goshen-Gottstein, Academic Studies Press, Boston, 2020, pp. 83–97.
- "Opening Formulas by Scribes in Talmudic Literature" (with H. Gershuni), in LITERARY SNIPPETS: Colophons Across Space and Time, ed. G. A. Kiraz & S. Schmidtke, Gorgias Press, 2023, pp. 61–78.
- "Reuniting minute fragments", Genizah Fragments, Cambridge University Library, No. 73, April 2017, p. 3.
- "Isaac Breuer's Approach to the Study and Instruction of the Babylonian Talmud", Judaica: Beiträge zum Verstehen des Judentums, 74:4 (2018), pp. 83–92.
- "Seven Hanukkot", CoAct International Journal, 2 (2020), pp. 43–53.
- "The Baal Shem Tov and the Boy who Played Flute on Yom Kippur", TheGemara.com, 2017. Link
- "Five Cups of Wine at the Seder?", TheGemara.com, 2018. Link
- "Surviving Manuscripts of the Talmud: An Overview", TheGemara.com, 2018. Link
