= Khwarizmi International Award =

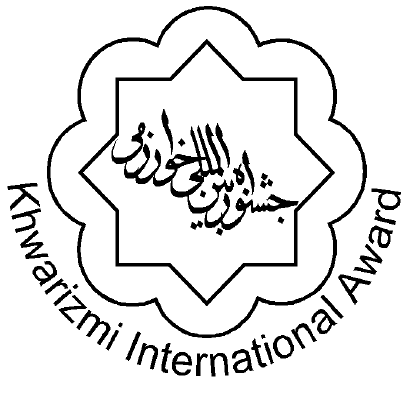
- Awarded for: Outstanding achievements in research, innovation and invention, in fields related to science and technology.
- Country: Iran
- Presented by: IROST
- First award: 1987
- Website: http://khwarizmi.ir/fkia/

The Khwarizmi International Award is a research award given annually by the President of Iran. The awardees, 10 senior researchers and 10 young researchers, are selected by the Iranian Research Organization for Science and Technology (IROST). It honors "individuals who have made outstanding achievements in research, innovation and invention, in fields related to science and technology". The award is given to the most prominent scientists and engineers, with a recent emphasis on digital and mechanical technologies, and is generally considered as the most prestigious scientific award in Iran. Participation is open to non-Iranian researchers. The awards are named in honor of Muhammad ibn Musa al-Khwarizmi, the eminent scholar and scientist. They represent the oldest and one of the most prestigious science and technology events in the West Asia.

From the 10th KIA Session, International Organizations such as WIPO, UNESCO, IFIA, COMSTECH, COMSATS, TWAS, and ISESCO sponsored the KIA.

== History ==
In 1987, the Iranian Research Organization for Science and Technology (IROST), affiliated with the Ministry of Science, Research and Technology of Iran, decided to institute an award to recognize outstanding Iranian achievements in the field of science and technology. IROST proposed the creation of the Khwarizmi Award in memory of the Persian mathematician al-Khwarizmi. Although the first session, held in 1987, was open exclusively to Iranian nationals, the award became international as of the fifth session. After the first award ceremony, it has been officially decided that the award should be accorded, annually, in February. The award certificate would be officially signed and presented by the President of Iran.

At the third session, the fields of medical sciences and basic sciences were added to the engineering and technical fields of participation. During this same session, the World Intellectual Property Organization (WIPO) stepped in and offered its first sponsorship. WIPO presented a gold medal and a certificate to the first Laureate of the innovation category. Originally, the first Khwarizmi Award contest was held at national level. After the fifth year, the contest opened its door to regional countries. In that year, besides the 19 national Laureates, two prestigious foreign Laureates received the Khwarizmi Award which subsequently produced the foreign section. The fifth session was also important because of the addition of the field of human sciences. The Khwarizmi Award became a strong incentive of excellence for the Iranian researchers, in many different fields of science.

The sixth session was held with the participation of national and regional research works from 10 countries, 18 national research works and 3 foreign research works were selected. In 1994, the seventh session the Khwarizmi Award took another significant step with the participation of new countries from Africa and Asia. For more precision in the evaluation process, research works were classified in new different categories, applied research works and fundamental research works, each category with its own evaluation criteria. The competition was broadened to attract more fields of research and eight distinct scientific committees were created: Mechanics, Chemical Industry, Electrical Electronics and Computer, Civil Engineering, Agriculture, Basic Sciences, Medical Sciences and Human Sciences.

Apart from that, at the seventh session, the Khwarizmi Award expanded its area of participation and became an international contest, where all the countries from all over the world were invited to participate and it was renamed as the Khwarizmi International Award (KIA).

From the 10th KIA Session, International Organizations such as WIPO, UNESCO, IFIA, COMSTECH, COMSATS, TWAS, ISESCO and WAITRO sponsored the KIA.

The 11th session began with the launch of a new call for participation to Iranian researchers residing abroad. In this session, two Iranian researchers residing abroad received the award.

The 21st KIA held in 2008 received 192 projects from 54 countries.

== KIA Laureates (International Section) ==
- Christoph Klein (Germany)
- Alireza Mashaghi (Netherlands)
- Tamio Hayashi (Japan)
- Fernand Labrie (Canada)
- Majid Samii (Germany)
- Paul S. Weiss (USA)
- Cecilia Lindgren (Sweden)
- Tofy Mussivand (Canada)
- Guido Kroemer (Spain)

== Khwarizmi Young Award ==
The Khwarizmi Young Award is a national version of Khwarizmi International Award open only to Iranians aged under 35, which has been awarded since 1999.

At the 12th session of KIA, applicants under 30 years old, students in Master and Ph.D. degrees, young inventors and innovators were invited to present their candidatures for a new award, with specific criteria. Consequently at the 13th KIA session, the Khwarizmi Youth Award (KYA) was independently launched to honor young promising scientists and embolden them to keep taking even bigger steps in their research career.

As of 2017, 19 sessions of KYA have been held, introducing many young Iranians who have made excellent contributions to the advancement of science, to the wider scientific community.

== See also ==
- List of engineering awards
