= Alireza Rastegar =

Iranian inventor (born 1978)

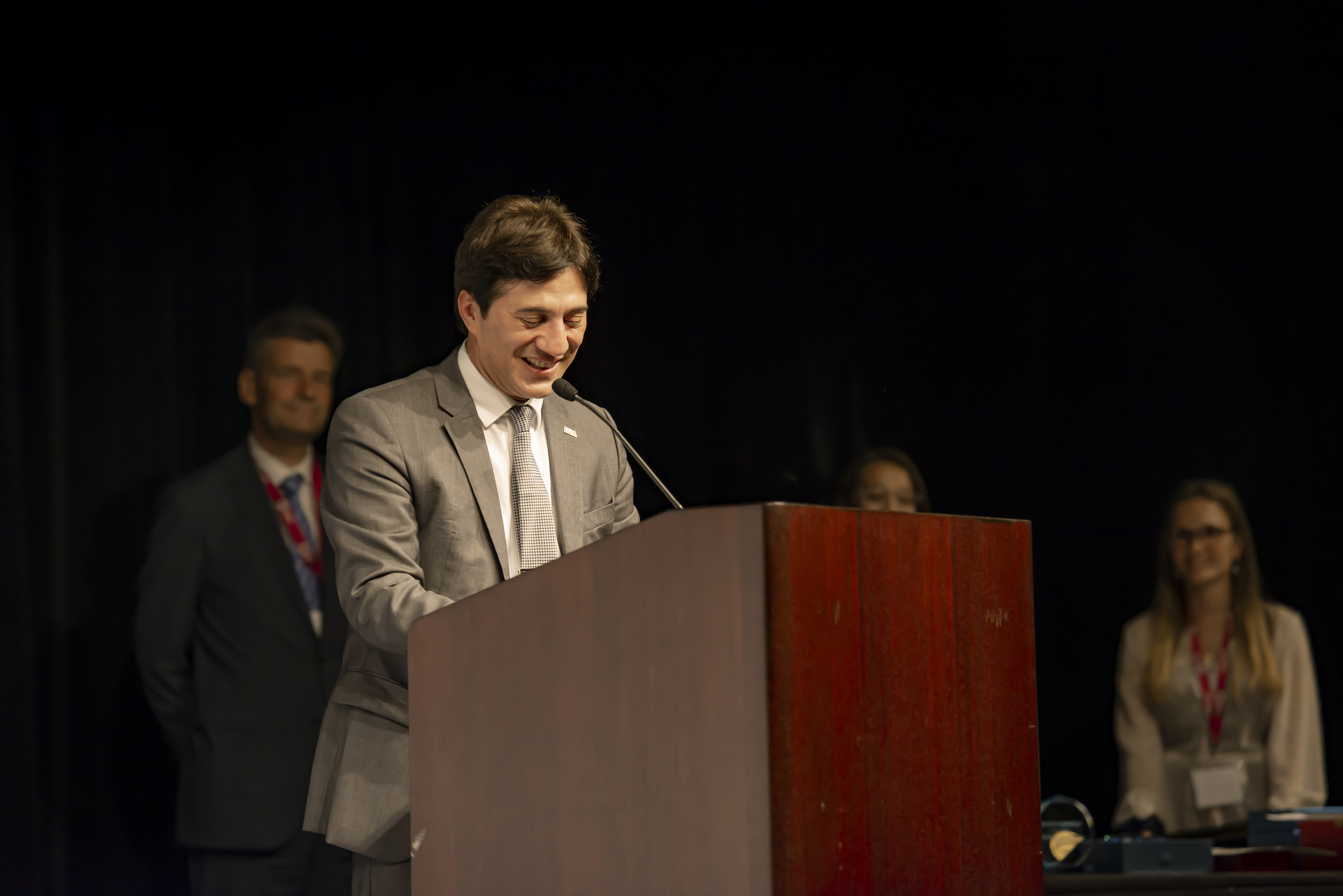
- Alireza Rastegar speaking at SVIIF 2019
- Born: May 17, 1978 (age 47); Tabriz, Iran
- Citizenship: Iranian
- Education: Doctor of Business Administration, Master of Business Administration, Graduate of Product Technology
- Alma mater: University of Tehran, College of Alameda, California
- Occupations: Founder of Silicon Valley International Invention Festival (SVIIF); Inventor; author
- Years active: 2000–present
- Known for: President, IFIA
- Awards: ISESCO; WIPO; KFAS; Khwarizmi International Award
- Website: alirezarastegar.com

Alireza Rastegar (Persian: علیرضا راستگار, born May 17, 1978) is an Iranian inventor, author, and recipient of numerous national and international awards. He is the president of the International Federation of Inventors' Associations, a non-profit organization founded in 1968, and founder of the Silicon Valley International Invention Festival. Alireza has authored six books on the innovation field. He is a member of the Forbes Business Council. In 2022, HKTDC (Hong Kong Trade Development Council) selected him as an honorary advisor of BIPASIA (Business of IP Asia Forum).

== Early life ==
Alireza Rastegar was born on May 17, 1978, in Tabriz, and grew up in Tehran city, Iran. His father, Ahad Rastegar, has worked as a chairman at Mellat Bank. Alireza is the second child and has two brothers and two sisters. He attended primary and secondary education in Tehran. Rastegar graduated from the University of Tehran in 2004 and received a master's degree in business management from the College of Alameda, California. He also holds two Doctorates of Business Administration.

== Career ==
Alireza started out his career as a head of Young Genius at Youth Organization, where he remained from 2000 to 2004. He was elected the executive committee member of the International Federation of Inventors' Associations in 2006. He was elected as IFIA president in November 2014 for a four-year term and re-elected in 2018 for an additional four-year term. and re-elected in 2023 for an additional four-year term. Rastegar has also led seminars at other international innovation events in nations including Turkey, Croatia, China, Germany, Switzerland, Malaysia, Thailand, Kuwait, South Korea, Hong Kong, and India.

He is the founder of the Silicon Valley International Invention Festival(SVIIF), where he has been chairman since 2017.

He currently serves on the board of international inventions events in many countries. He has helped to establish many national inventor's associations in countries like Turkey, Azerbaijan, Canada, Australia, Afghanistan, Nigeria, Sudan, Morocco, and Vietnam.

He serves as the chairman of the IFIA jury board for the select winner of the WIPO Medal for Best Patent in the framework of the IAP.

Rastegar has been a committee member of the World Women Inventors and Entrepreneur's Association since 2008 and has been editor of the International Journal of Scientific Research in Inventions for four years.

== Books and publications ==
- The Paradox Of Innovation: Embracing The Skill Of Unlearning
- How Leaders Can Find Uninterrupted Focus—And Why To Try It
- Challenging and opportunities for innovation management in today's world
- Individual and technical skills' development in the field of innovation
- Disaster Management
- What you need to know to patent
- Training Innovative Culture to Citizens
- Citizens and Creative Recycling
- A speed and accuracy comparative study of metallic collector-up InP
- Impact of using innovation on businesses during the covid-19 pandemic

== Awards ==
- 2000-2003: Received the outstanding award at the 2nd, 3rd and 5th Khwarizmi festival in 2000, 2001 and 2003
- 2003: Won the Islamic Educational, Scientific and Cultural Organization gold medal in 2003
- 2004: Received a gold medal Geneva International Inventions festival.
- 2006: Awarded the World Intellectual Property Organization gold medal for the outstanding inventor in 2006
- 2008: Received the gold medal from Kuwait Foundation for the Advancement of Sciences
- 2012: Received a genius medal at Budapest International Inventions festival
