= Iranian Research Organization for Science and Technology =

- سازمان پژوهش‌های علمی و صنعتی ایران
- Abbreviation: IROST
- Formation: 1980
- Type: Government agency
- Headquarters: Ahmadabad-e Mostowfi, Iran
- President: Dr. Alireza Ashori
- Parent organization: Ministry of Science, Research and Technology
- Website: irost.org

Iranian Research Organization for Science and Technology (IROST) (in Persian: سازمان پژوهش‌های علمی و صنعتی ایران) is a comprehensive science policy research center directly attached to the Ministry of Science, Research and Technology of Iran, which was approved and ratified by the Islamic Revolutionary Council of Iran in 1980. IROST is the biggest research center in Iran and is particularly engaged in the development of strategies, policies, R&D systems, management, foresight and evaluation of related Science and Technology (S&T) development and S&T for economic progress. The organization currently comprises the Institute of New Technologies and the Science and Technology Park. Several governments have noted it to be an organization of concern for procurement related to Weapons of Mass Destruction.

IROST has advanced alternative energy sources, including solar energy, microalgae-based biodiesel, and bi-ethanol from agricultural waste. IROST has also made progress in pharmacological fields.

IROST undertakes commissioned research with International Organizations such as,

- United Nations Educational, Scientific and Cultural Organization (UNESCO)
- World Intellectual Property Organization (WIPO)
- United Nations Development Programme (UNDP)
- Organisation of Islamic Conference Standing Committee on Scientific & Technological Cooperation (COMSTECH)
- Commission on Science and Technology for Sustainable Development in the South (COMSATS)
- Third World Academy of Science (TWAS)
- Islamic Educational, Scientific and Cultural Organization (ISESCO)
- International Federation of Inventors' Associations (IFIA)
- Asian Pacific Center for Transfer of Technology (APCTT)
- Indian Ocean Rim Association for Regional Cooperation (IOR-ARC)

== International Journals ==
1. Advances in Environmental Technology
2. Hydrogen, Fuel Cell & Energy Storage
3. Innovative Food Technologies
4. Journal of Particle Science and Technology
5. Journal of Technology Development Management
6. Microbiology, Metabolites and Biotechnology

== See also ==
- Science and technology in Iran
- Intellectual property in Iran
- Special Headquarters for the Development of Nanotechnology
