= Iran National Science Foundation =

Iranian government agency

The Iran National Science Foundation (INSF) (Persian: صندوق حمایت از پژوهشگران کشور) is an Iranian government agency that supports fundamental research and education in the fields of science, engineering, and medical science.

The current director of INSF is Eaman Eftekhari (as 2019). The first director was Mohammad Farhadi, who served from 2002 to Feb 2011, followed by Nosratoallh Zargham.

== Introduction ==
The fast development in science and technology and role of a knowledge-based economy in global changes caused some to predict that the chief rulers of the world in the future would be nations and governments which have had the greatest contribution in planning, supporting, and financing science, technology and research. As a result of the request of a group of scholars and thinkers of the university and Hozeh (religious academies) on Oct. 7th, 2003, the Supreme Leader of Iran ordered the Supreme Council of the Cultural Revolution to prepare the grounds for backing production of scientific software, and also to institutionalize scientific space in the country.

The Council of Scientific Researches of Iran ratified the charter of the INSF on its 522nd session, 18 Feb 2003, in order to fulfill the 4th paragraph of the 3rd article of the Constitution, and the 6th paragraph of the act: "The Position, Objectives, and Responsibilities of the Supreme Council of Cultural Revolution". This foundation was established with the purpose of supplying researchers' welfare, organizing the production of science and technology, preparing executive grounds in the country for directing research and technological proceeds towards people, and permanent development of the country.

INSF is a legally independent governmental institute, which is administered by a board of trustees. It is located in the presidential institute. The assets of this foundation are supplied via governmental aids, bank facilities, investments of its own surplus assets, receiving both financially and non-financially from true or legal persons. President of the foundation has the highest position in INSF. Under the board's approval and the order of the chairman of the board of trustees, the president will preside over the foundation for a four-year period of time. The current president of the foundation is Dr. Mohammad Farhadi.

In Iran, the foundation supports those who have been described in accordance with the countries needs and priorities. A book published by the National Scientific Research council defines these the research priorities.

== Principal policies, work strategies and priorities ==
INSF's board of trustees act on December 10, 2003

According to article 3, paragraph 4 of the constitution, and based on article 16 of the act "The Positions, Objectives and Responsibilities of the Supreme Council of Cultural Revolution", Iran National Science Foundation was founded with a primary asset of 20 billion Rials, which had been supplied by governmental aids.

=== Manifest of INSF's mission ===
"Iran National Science Foundation works to prepare the executive grounds for the generation of science and technology and the presentation of material and spiritual supportive aids and services for true or legal researchers, in order for research affairs to flourish and to direct the proceeds of research and technology towards people."

To back this cause the foundation is committed to:

1. pave the route for the country to pioneer modern technologies,
2. prepare special supports for national projects, or the projects which have strategic and international importance for the country,
3. set spiritual supports for researchers and enhancement of their position in society as its main priorities,
4. supply welfare and comfort for researchers,
5. identify research requirements and priorities of the country and support their fulfillment,
6. direct the proceeds of research projects towards people,
7. prepare grounds for country's permanent development in technology.

=== Work Strategies ===
According to article 3 of the foundation's statute "activities of this foundation include comprehensive spiritual and financial support for Iranian researchers (both academic and nonacademic) both domestic and overseas, for the purpose of quantitative and qualitative enhancement of science and technology production, preparing the grounds for application of research results and generation of science at national and international levels." In this regard the following strategies are considered:

1. the turnover of the foundation and the way it presents facilities must be simple and transparent,
2. for effective orientation of its activities, the foundation must announce the lists of its subjects and titles of its projects with priority,
3. for priority assessment of the projects, proper methods must be applied. To improve supportive role of the foundation, it is necessary that instead of direct financial aids, the given facilities be in the form of services,
4. applicant researchers (true or legal persons) must necessarily have authentic successful scientific research backgrounds relevant to their requested subject,
5. the foundation must be willing to attract other organizations and encourage people's participation in its plans; researchers (true or legal ones) must participate in investment as far as possible,
6. the supported plans must prepare the ground for access to modern technologies needed, or they must be economically justified if possible.

=== Material Supports ===
Under article 3, amendment 1 of the foundation's statute "material support includes: financing and facilitating of budget allocation process for researchers' approved plans certified by the foundation, supplying a portion of the expenses for participation in valid international conferences and preparing research equipments and requirements approved by scientific committee of the foundation." In this regard the following general policies are considered:

1. the facilities to be presented in the form of service presentations and in an indirect way, as far as possible,
2. to refuse the payments for equipment and requirements as for as possible,
3. as far as possible, researchers (true or legal) participate in supplying the expenses, of plans,
4. the foundation should share in intellectual property and material profits of the plans.

=== Non-financial Support ===
Based on article 3, amendment 2 of the statute, Non-financial spiritual supports include: administrative support, scientific introduction and approval of researchers, preparing conditions for their scientific reverence and awarding them with prizes. In this regard the foundation's general policies are based on the following issues:

1. arranging opportunities for the appreciation and reverence of selected researchers in accordance with other institutes responsible in this field,
2. having active connection with relevant organizations to improve researchers' position in the society,
3. using legal devices and strategies for propagating the culture and spirit of research entrepreneurship.

=== Intellectual Property ===
Intellectual property of the plans supported by the foundation, and their resulting achievements and reports will be defined according to the foundation's supports and the type and subject of plans. In return for financial and spiritual supports, the foundation can hold a portion or the whole intellectual property of the plan's achievements. In this regard, the foundation's general principles are:

1. contact with internal or foreign authentic and legal centers in order to cover service needs for patenting of inventions and their intellectual property,
2. researchers share probable material profits of their idea, as far as possible,
3. there must be a system for patenting the ideas of those researchers who present their innovative plans to the foundation as well as for protection of their rights,
4. if ever execution of the plans needs cooperation of several researchers, a necessary network must be established among them, preserving each one's rights.

=== Supportive Priorities of the Foundation ===
Considering the basic function of the foundation, "generation of science and technology, and benefiting the nation from its profits", (based on article 2 of the foundation's statute) the following basic priorities for allocation of finance and non-financial and financial facilities of the foundation are defined:

1. according to article 3, amendment 4 of the foundation statute, "for using supports and aids domestic researchers have priority over others,"
2. the plans and requests must necessarily be in the field of modern and advanced sciences and technologies. The foundation's subjective priorities will annually be approved by the scientific committee,
3. applicant's requested subjects must possess a kind of innovation, creativity and originality. Moreover, the plans should not be step by step repetition of experiences of the developed countries, or translation and duplication of research findings of other countries,
4. the plans must have distinctive characteristics in comparison to similar domains. In other words, they must not be included in the responsibility domain or work field of other domestic institutes, responsible for supporting researches,
5. the plans must prepare the ground for the creation of new and specialized job opportunities (especially for the elite),
6. the plans must have economic and technical justifications, and as far as possible return of the investment,
7. the plans must show a certain result, if possible, within a short span of time.

== The Charter for Presentation of Facilities by INSF ==
To execute the act of session 522- 29 July 2003 of the Cultural Revolution Supreme Council, regarding the statute of Iran National Science Foundation (here in this charter referred to as "the foundation"), the following executive charter was ratified in the board of trustees' session 1 Dec, 2003.

=== Objective ===
Presentation of services and facilities to those who present research plans regarding the explanation of the proceeding should be in accordance with the objectives of the statute.

=== Application Scope ===
Under article 3 of the statute, supports of the foundation covers all Iranian researchers (both true and legal persons) whether academic or nonacademic, inside or outside the country. Moreover, according to article 3 amendment 4, researchers inside the country have priority over others.

=== Concepts and Definitions ===
Facilities: The foundation's direct material (financial) supports for the applicants Services: The foundation's indirect material supports for the applicants

=== Types of Supports ===
The foundation's supports are conducted in two different ways as follows:

a) Material supports

a-1) Facilities (grants or credits/loans),
a-2) Investments (participation in the execution of plans)

b) Services.

=== Elaborating on the Types of Supports ===
==== Grants ====
They are granted to those plans which possess the priorities of the foundation, but can not return the facilities in short term. The evaluation committee is responsible to specify and recognize such plans. For the plans covered by this article, possession of a portion of the plan is reserved for the foundation, and if needed or preferred, the foundation can sell or use the practical advantages of it.

==== Credit Facilities (loans) ====
This kind of facilities is for those plans which have economic justifications and accord with priority policies of the foundation. The evaluation committee is responsible for the recognition and specifying the above. The time period for this kind of facilities to be returned is three years, and the interest rate and commission for the facilities is max 10%.

==== Investment (participation in the execution of plans) ====
For this kind of facilities, besides its economic justifications, the researcher supplies a portion of the needed investment. According to its share, the foundation will also share profits and losses. To participate or not, the right for selection is reserved for the foundation.

==== Granting Services ====
A) Reimbursement of the expense to attend international scientific conferences and assemblies.

According to the statute, the foundation undertakes to pay back researchers' expenses for conferences and international scientific assemblies attended. These types of supports are categorized as grants but the foundation has the right to utilize the results of the researcher's reports of attendance in such conferences or assemblies.

B) Support to hold scientific-research courses

This kind of supports is with the purpose of more communication and acquaintance and dialogue among researchers, as well as getting familiar with the most recent scientific and research achievements. The expenses for such courses, suggested by the researcher to introduce the selected proposal to other researchers and academic societies, are being paid by the foundation.

C) Helping invention patent

One of the duties for the scientific committee of the foundation is to prepare strategies to facilitate patenting the inventions and discoveries relevant to those plans which have passed their research and executive stages under support of the foundation, inside and outside the country.

Since 2007 until 2018, 1075 Iranians have applied through INSF to file a patent application in USPTO (United States Patent and Trademark Office). Of this number of applications, 327 cases (30.4%) were approved, 240 were filed and 67 were patented and 139 inventions were obtained. See also: Intellectual property in Iran

D) Supplying the research equipment needed for the research

=== Non-financial supports ===
These supports include the following:

A) Introducing the researcher to research and service centers

According to mutual relations between INSF and other research, higher education centers such as universities, and their agreement to use their facilities and equipment, INSF introduces the researchers to the above centers in order to use the mentioned facilities.

B) Granting rewards

On various occasions, some rewards will be granted to the researchers and those who have presented selected proposals.

C) Scientific confirmation of the researchers

D) Other administrative supports

== Research Chair ==
In order to implement the policies of the fourth development national program, as well as to strengthen the knowledge-based system and considering the increasing significance of research and technology and in order to improve the capacities for generation and preservation of science and technology, to support outstanding Iranian researchers, to create research capacities at national level and particularly to stop the increasing trend of brain drain and to implement the enactment of INSF board of trustees on 6 July 2005, the temporary charter for research chair was compiled as the following:

=== Article 1: Objectives ===
- to help the creation of new research capacities especially for promising, broad-minded and farsighted researchers,
- to help to attract Iranian members of scientific boards and researchers residing inside or outside the country,
- to help to stop brain drain,
- to support promising researches,
- to help the creation of dynamic and productive scientific environments,
- to support training skillful and specialized forces (like MA and PhD graduates) with the purpose of improving educational quality while taking into account educational factors,
- to achieve new scientific findings,
- to train skillful and specialized forces,
- to increase participation in expansion of science boundaries and strengthening scientific position of the country,
- To carry out the needed researches to solve national problems.

In order to execute the enactment of the foundation's board of trustees and to accelerate the allocation of research chairs, this program will be executed in the form of pivotal institution, in the educational year 84-85.

=== Article 2: Definitions and Concepts ===
Researcher: according to article 3, amendment 3 of the statute, researcher refers to true or legal persons who have knowledge experience and scientific degrees as well as research achievements and their scientific qualifications have been approved by the scientific committee of the foundation.

Applicant: refers to true or legal researchers who, according to the articles of the charter, have applied or volunteered for research chairs and have completed the forms related to research chairs of the foundation.

=== Article 3: Conditions ===
To support Iranian researchers, the research seat will be granted to the researchers who are promising and have authentic scientific background, new and promising ideas and innovations and research proposals; they must also have enough understanding of the necessities and needs of the society in regard to researcher's specialized field, or work in institutes with strategic program, according to the following conditions:

- having scientific valid degrees,
- having valid authorships and articles relevant to her/his specialty,
- having completed research plans (expansion of knowledge boundaries, generation of science, responsiveness to the needs society),
- having plans which have reached a semi-industrial level,
- having projects which have reached the production level,
- having strategic research plans,
- having the ability to direct and train skillful and specialized workforce,
- having new innovative and farsighted ideas.

Amendment 1
an institute or institutes, which according to the strategic committee of research seat have strategic research plan or plans, will be selected as pivotal one(s) experimentally in 2005-2006.

=== Article 4: Strategic Committee of Research Seat ===
This committee is established with the purpose of examining the conditions of the qualified applicants for granting research seat and being introduced to the scientific committee for final ratification. This committee is composed of seven members as following:

Permanent members

- executive deputy of the foundation as head of the committee and director of the research seat,
- evaluation manager of the foundation plans,
- manager of public relations and international affairs of the foundation,
- two members of the scientific committee selected by the foundation's president,
- one representative from the supreme council of biotechnology, one representative from nanotechnology headquarters and one from the supreme council of information.

Temporary members

- two persons from among the outstanding professors and researchers of the country relevant to the specialized field, appointed by the foundation's president.

Amendment 1
Regarding the subject, the strategic committee can invite legal persons as well (for example, research deputy of the ministry of science, research and technology, research deputy of the ministry of health, treatment and medical education, and ...).

Amendment 2
This committee is responsible for pursuing the execution and progression of the affairs related to research seat, selection of candidates through investigating the received questionnaires in accordance with the charter. The committee is authorized with a quorum of four members, and its enactments become irrevocable with four favorable votes.

=== Article 5: Expert Examination ===
The strategic committee evaluates the presented information according to the guidelines for the standards of receiving a research seat, and introduces qualified applicants to the scientific committee of the foundation for final decision.

=== Article 6: The Stages for the Evaluation and Granting of Research chairs to the Researchers ===
1- Limited invitation, according to the foundation's research priorities,
2- Completion of the questionnaires for research seat (attached questionnaire),
3- Expert examination,
4- Granting a research seat of 300,000,000 Rls in the year 2005.

Amendment 1: After assignment of the research seat, the activities for fund allocation of each seat and passing executive stages will be carried out by management of financial and support affairs and management of evaluation of plans, and in accordance with the approved charter and guidelines of the foundation.

Amendment 2: The strategic committee of research seat is responsible for the supervision over well implementation of the enactments of this charter.

This charter including 6 articles and 5 amendments was ratified on 23/9/1384.

== See also ==
- Science and technology in Iran
- Higher education in Iran
- International rankings of Iran
- Special Headquarters for the Development of Nanotechnology
