= Miklós Bendzsel =

- Born: June 23, 1953 (age 73)
- Education: Corvinus University of Budapest
- Occupations: Mechanical engineer, engineer-economist
- Known for: Former President of the Hungarian Intellectual Property Office (HIPO)
- Awards: Hungarian Order of Merit (2003); Dr. István Orbán Memorial Medal (2016)

Miklós Bendzsel (born June 23, 1953, in Budapest) is a mechanical engineer, engineer-economist and former president of the Hungarian Intellectual Property Office (HIPO).

== Career ==
Bendzsel graduated as a mechanical engineer from Budapest University of Technology and Economics in 1976 and as an engineer-economist from Corvinus University of Budapest in 1983. Between 1976 and 1980 he was a research engineer at Gépipari Tudományos Intézet.

From 1980 he worked at Szellemi Tulajdon Nemzeti Hivatal. Bendzsel was president of the Office Hungarian Intellectual Property Office (HIPO).

He is a member of the European Academy of Sciences and Arts.

== Academic career ==
Bendzsel is professor emeritus at the Moholy-Nagy University of Art and Design in Budapest.

== Social engagement ==
Bendzsel holds leading positions in several NGOs, such as the Hungarian Industrial Property and Copyright Association and the Hungarian Academy of Engineering.

He has been the co-chairman of the Association of Hungarian Database Distributors since 1997. At the 113th meeting of the Administrative Council of the European Patent Organization, held in Munich on March 4–6, 2008, he was elected as a member of the Administrative Council together with Mihály Ficsor. At the 126th meeting of the Administrative Council, held in The Hague on December 15, 2010, he was unanimously elected as vice-chairman of the Administrative Council. His term of office was for three years. At its meeting on October 16, 2013, the Administrative Council of the European Patent Organization re-elected Miklós Bendzsel as vice-chairman for a further three-year term.

He is a member of several governmental and inter-ministerial committees.

Bendzsel is vice-chairman of the National Anti-Counterfeiting Board and vice-president of the Assembly of the Berne Union of the United Nations World Intellectual Property Organization.

He is also a member of the European Design Leadership Board.

== Personal life ==
Bendzsel's grandfather, László Kazinczy, was a mechanical engineer at the Budapest University of Technology and Economics and former chief designer of Gamma Optikail Művek, a Hungarian camera maker.

== Awards ==
Bendzsel was awarded the Hungarian Order of Merit in 2003 and the Dr. István Orbán Memorial Medal in 2016.
