= Israel Science Foundation =

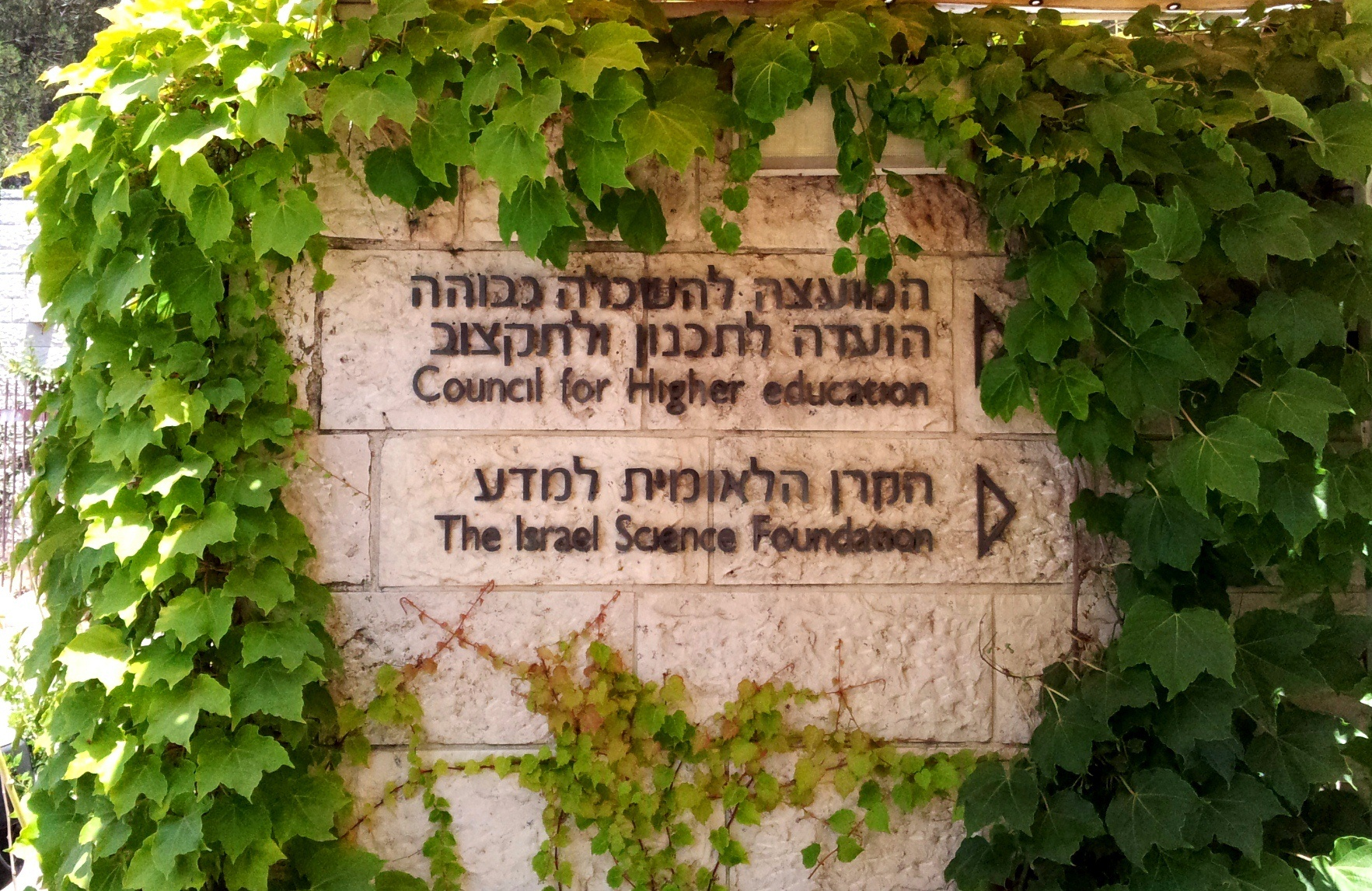
A sign at the entrance to the Council of Higher Education buildings and the National Science Foundation, Jerusalem

The Israel Science Foundation (ISF) is a nonprofit organization that provides monetary grants for scientific research in Israel. It is the Israeli analogue of scientific funding bodies in other countries such as the US National Science Foundation, the Canadian Natural Sciences and Engineering Research Council or the Iran National Science Foundation. It is administered by the Israel Academy of Sciences and Humanities.

The foundation was created in 1972 as the Branch for Basic Research and assumed its present name in 1991. The foundation is administered by the Israel Academy of Sciences and Humanities. The foundation's activities span all fields: exact sciences and technology, life sciences and medicine, and humanities and social sciences. From 2002 to 2009, the foundation was headed by Joseph Klafter.

The annual budget of the science foundation is 142 million USD. The majority of ISF funding comes from the Government of Israel. The Foundation’s research grants are awarded on a competitive basis, based on indicators of scientific excellence, in various areas, and according to need. The Foundation uses a unique evaluation system to determine grant recipients. Israeli researchers from universities, research institutes, other higher education institutions, and hospitals are eligible to apply for grants.Grants are awarded for individual research projects to one or more researchers, to university research centers, to conduct research seminars, and to purchase modern and expensive research equipment.
