= Asian Pacific Center for Transfer of Technology =

UN-affiliated international organization

The Asian and Pacific Centre for Transfer of Technology is a regional institution of the United Nations Economic and Social Commission for Asia and the Pacific (UNESCAP). It was established on 16 July 1977 as the Regional Centre for Technology Transfer in Bengaluru. In 1985, it was renamed, and in 1993 it relocated to New Delhi under a host country agreement with the Government of India. The organisation is regarded as the first technology and engineering body for technology capacity-building in the Asia-Pacific region. In December 2018, UNESCAP published an evaluation report on the organisation.

== See also ==
- Science, technology, engineering, and mathematics
- Asia Pacific Network of Science and Technology Centres
- United Nations Economic and Social Council
