= Special Headquarters for the Development of Nanotechnology =

Iranian government body

The Special Headquarters for the Development of Nanotechnology is a governmental body in Iran that was established in the autumn of 2003 by a directive of then-President Seyed Mohammad Khatami. It was formed as part of the Iranian government's efforts to coordinate policies related to nanotechnology and to define national priorities in this field. According to official statements, its stated responsibilities include setting strategic plans, coordinating implementation among governmental bodies, and providing institutional support for nanotechnology-related activities in both the public and private sectors.

== History ==
The origins of the Special Headquarters for the Development of Nanotechnology date back to the early 2000s. In this period, Gholam Ali Mansouri, a professor at the University of Illinois at Chicago, held discussions with Mohammad Taghi Ebtekar, who was then serving as the science and technology advisor to President Seyed Mohammad Khatami, regarding developments in the field of nanotechnology. Following these discussions, Ebtekar proposed the establishment of a coordinated governmental body focused on nanotechnology. With the approval of President Khatami, the Nanotechnology Policy Studies Committee was subsequently formed within the Presidential Office of Technology Cooperation. This committee operated from 2001 to 2003, before being reorganized in 2003 as the Special Headquarters for the Development of Nanotechnology.

== Composition ==
The Special Headquarters for Nanotechnology Development was formed with the following composition:

- First vice president (in the ninth administration, the vice president for Science and Technology) – head of the Headquarters
- Head of the Management and Planning Organization of Iran (in the ninth administration, vice president for Planning)
- Minister of Economic Affairs and Finance
- Minister of Health and Medical Education
- Minister of Agriculture Jihad
- Minister of Industry and Mines
- Minister of Science, Research, and Technology
- Minister of Petroleum
- Head of the Presidential Office of Technology Cooperation – secretary of the Headquarters
- Five experts and national managers appointed by the chairperson

== Responsibilities ==
The responsibilities of the Special Headquarters for Nanotechnology Development include:

- Approving the overall goals, strategies, policies, and national programs related to the development of nanotechnology in Iran
- Assigning general responsibilities to governmental bodies, defining sector-specific missions, and coordinating activities within the framework of the national long-term plan
- Monitoring the implementation of objectives and programs

== Secretariat ==
The secretariat of the Special Headquarters for Nanotechnology Development is based within the Presidential Office of Technology Cooperation. Its responsibilities include:

- Coordinating the executive affairs of the Headquarters
- Collaborating with nanotechnology committees of relevant governmental bodies in the study and drafting of goals, policies, and strategies
- Evaluating and preparing progress reports on the activities of various sectors and the achievement of national objectives for review in the Headquarters' follow-up meetings
- Following up on specific matters assigned to the secretariat by the Headquarters

== Programs ==
At a Headquarters meeting held on November 24, 2004, the framework of the long-term nanotechnology development program was approved. According to the plan, the program was to be submitted to the cabinet in accordance with Article 43, Clause B, of the Fourth Development Plan. The document, entitled Future Strategy, was approved by the cabinet on July 23, 2005.

Following the approval of the Future Strategy, which outlines three major goals, twelve strategies, and fifty-three executive programs, all Headquarters programs—including short-term initiatives—were organized within the framework of this strategy. To establish overall policies for each of the fifty-three programs and coordinate implementation by responsible organizations, four working groups were formed in 2005:

- Human Resources Development Working Group
- Technology Development Infrastructure Working Group
- Promotion and Strengthening of Intellectual and Cultural Foundations Working Group
- Technology and Production Development Working Group

Each working group consists of representatives from the member organizations of the Headquarters. They are responsible for preparing regulations and guidelines required for implementing the programs, as well as monitoring their execution. Regulations developed by the working groups are communicated through the Headquarters' official website.

In 2007, based on experiences gained during three years of implementing the Future Strategy, the Headquarters reviewed and revised the programs within the framework of a ten-year document covering 2008–2010, resulting in the preparation of the second supplementary Future Strategy document. This document is also available on the Headquarters' official website.

== Key figures in the development of nanotechnology in Iran ==
- Seyed Mohammad Khatami: Fifth president of Iran; supported government programs in emerging technologies, particularly nanotechnology.
- Mohammad Reza Aref: First vice president in Khatami's administration and the inaugural Chairperson of the Nanotechnology Development Headquarters.
- Mohammad Taghi Ebtekar: Former faculty member at the College of Engineering, University of Tehran; senior science and technology advisor to the President; key figure in founding the Special Headquarters for Nanotechnology.
- Gholam Ali Mansouri: Professor at the University of Illinois at Chicago, USA; contributed to the introduction of nanotechnology in Iran.
- Hashem Rafi’i Tabar: Professor at Shahid Beheshti University of Medical Sciences; active in nanotechnology research, including work on carbon nanotubes in 2006.
- Seyed Reza Sajjadi: Former head of the Presidential Office of Technology Cooperation and former secretary of the Nanotechnology Headquarters; currently Iran's ambassador to Russia.
- Ali Mohammad Soltani: Head of the Nanotechnology Policy Studies Committee and director of the Nanotechnology Headquarters Secretariat from its inception.
- Saeed Sarkar: Professor at Tehran University of Medical Sciences; member and secretary of the Nanotechnology Headquarters.
- Ali Beitollahi: Professor at Iran University of Science and Technology; member of the Nanotechnology Headquarters from its inception.

== Key events in the development of nanotechnology in Iran ==
- 2000: Establishment of the Nanotechnology Policy Studies Committee.
- 2001: Formation of the first student nanotechnology association in Iran and publication of the first Persian-language book on nanotechnology.
- 2003: Formation of the Special Headquarters for Nanotechnology Development by presidential directive.
- 2004: Approval of the ten-year nanotechnology development program by the Cabinet, allocation of budget to the Nanotechnology Headquarters, and establishment of the first nanotechnology company in Iran.
- 2005: Suspension of a portion of the Headquarters' budget during the ninth administration; nationwide call for nanotechnology projects.
- 2006: Resumption of Headquarters activities and continuation of the development program; production of the first commercial nanotechnology-based product in Iran.
- 2007: Headquarters activities placed under the supervision of the Vice Presidency for Science and Technology; expansion of facilities and programs.
- 2007: Drafting and approval of the second Future Strategy document covering 2008–2010.
- 2008: Expansion of international collaborations; growth in scientific publications and patent activity related to nanotechnology in Iran.

== See also ==
- Nanotechnology
- Science and technology in Iran
- Iranian Research Organization for Science and Technology
