= International Federation of Inventors' Associations =

Non-governmental organization

International Federation of Inventors' Associations (IFIA)
- Fédération Internationale des Associations d’Inventeurs
- Abbreviation: IFIA
- Formation: (July 11, 1968; 58 years ago)
- Founded at: London, United Kingdom
- Type: International non-governmental organization Nonprofit organization
- Location: Geneva, Switzerland
- Region served: Worldwide
- Members: More Than 175 members from 80 Countries and Territories
- Official languages: English
- President: Alireza Rastegar
- Key people: Farag Moussa (Honorary President); Harald Romanus; Leif Nordstrand (founders)
- Website: www.ifia.com

The International Federation of Inventors' Associations (IFIA) is a non-profit, nongovernmental organization founded in London under the supervision of the United Nations, on July 11, 1968, by inventors of Denmark, Finland, Germany, Great Britain, Norway, Sweden and Switzerland.

== IFIA history ==
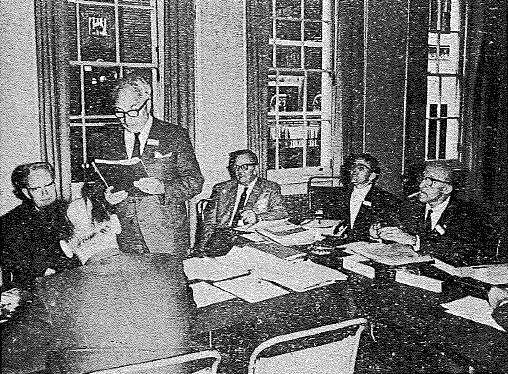
IFIA first meeting in 1968

IFIA was established in 1968 in London by the cooperation of the representatives of seven European countries, namely Denmark, Finland, Germany, Great Britain, Norway, Sweden and Switzerland. The IFIA is registered as one of the partners of International Geneva United Nation Office in Geneva. The IFIA logo registered in Swiss Federal Institute of Intellectual Property. The organization has member organizations in more than 100 countries, and around 175 member organizations in total. The IFIA has a General Assembly, that includes an Executive Committee and elects the IFIA President.

== IFIA affiliations ==
IFIA has observer status (Special Category – Technology) at the United Nations Conference on Trade and Development; observer status at the World Intellectual Property Organization (WIPO); has United Nations Industrial Development Organization's (UNIDO) consultative status; is a member of the Standing Advisory Committee before the European Patent Office (SACEPO); and is included among the Assembly of Professional Society in European Alliance for Innovation (EAI). IFIA received a grant special consultative status from the United Nations Economic and Social Council (ECOSOC) on June 6, 2019. IFIA also is Members of MIT's Solve community.

== Organizational structure ==
The International Federation of Inventors' Associations (IFIA) operates through the following organizational bodies:

- General Assembly: The highest governing body of the federation, composed of member countries.
- President:The highest executive authority, elected by the General Assembly for a four-year term from among the experienced and influential members.
- The Vice Presidents are appointed by the IFIA President and approved by the Executive Committee. Their tenure and responsibilities are aligned with IFIA’s mission to foster global innovation and intellectual property awareness. A full list of IFIA Vice Presidents is available on the official IFIA website IFIA | Global Innovation Platform.
- Executive Committee:The policymaking body of the federation, appointed by the General Assembly for a two-yearterm.
- Secretaries:Executive managers overseeing various operational areas of the federation, appointed by the President.
- Regional Networks: Coordinators of continental programs, representing the five global regions.
- Treasurer:Manages financial operations and auditing.

== Full Members of the International Federation of Inventors' Associations (IFIA) ==
The International Federation of Inventors' Associations (IFIA) consists of full members representing national inventor associations, innovation organizations, and institutions that actively contribute to the promotion of invention and innovation worldwide. These full members are recognized by IFIA as official representatives of their respective countries, working collaboratively to support inventors, enhance intellectual property awareness, and foster a global innovation ecosystem.

As full members, these organizations participate in IFIA’s General Assembly, Executive Committee meetings, and policy-making decisions, ensuring the federation remains a strong advocate for inventors on an international level. They are also responsible for organizing IFIA-endorsed invention exhibitions, competitions, and educational programs in their regions.

Currently, IFIA comprises full members from over 100 countries.

== Presidents ==
The President shall be elected by the General Assembly for a period of four years (until the ordinary session of the General Assembly).

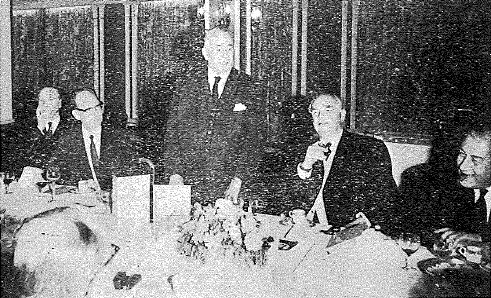
IFIA FIRST PRESIDENT

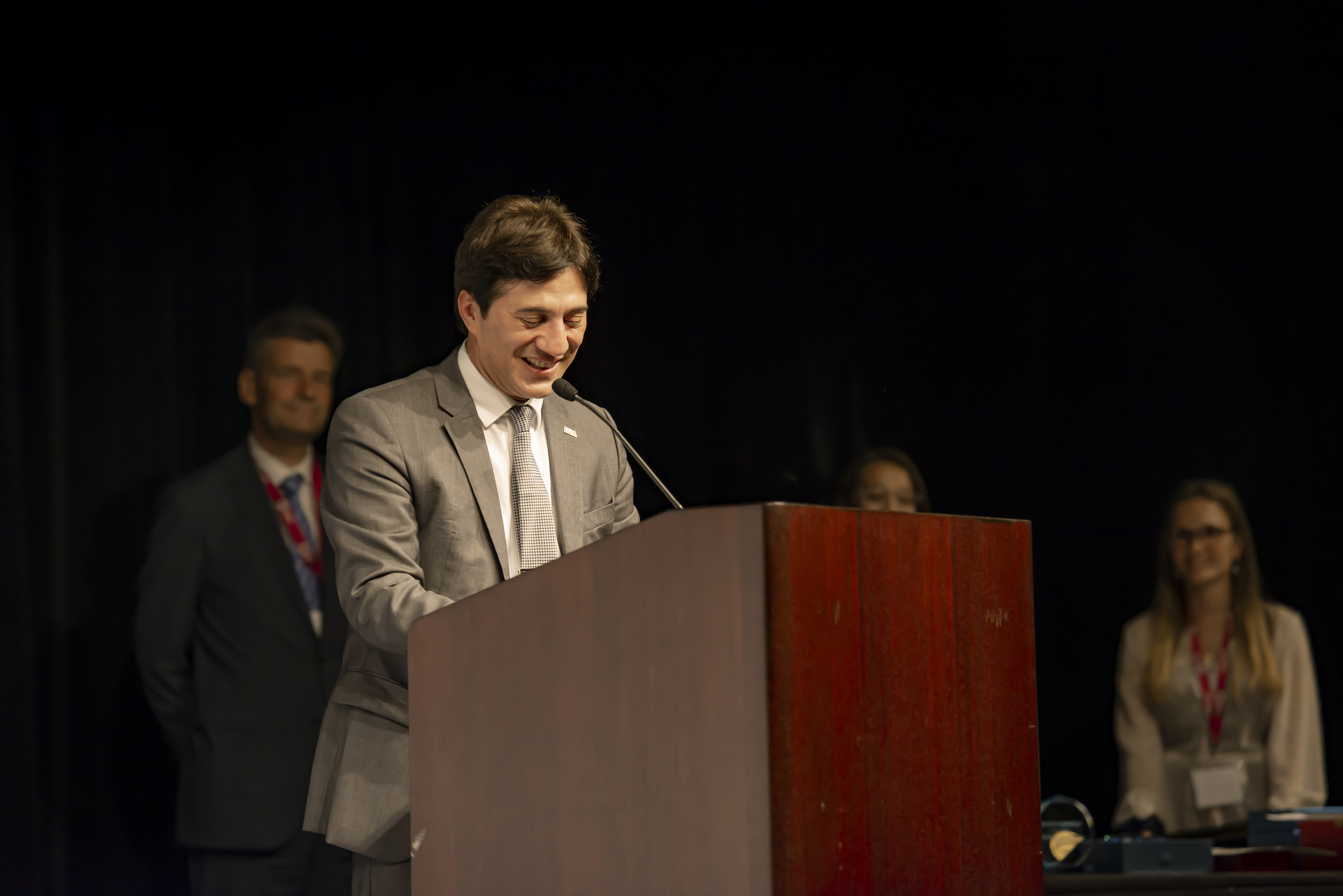
IFIA President Alireza Rastegar

== IFIA activities ==
The International Federation of Inventors' Associations (IFIA) undertakes various activities to support and promote innovation and invention worldwide. IFIA organizes and supports the publication of reference books, guides, surveys, studies, conferences and conventions, illustrative exhibits related to inventors and inventions, and consultative services. They also sponsor the IFIA Awards, which since 2015 have including the Best Invention Medal, Ambassador Medal, and the Memorial medal. Prior awards have included the Global Golden Medal. The Memorial Medal has been awarded to Ivo Josipoviæm, Teresa Stanek Rea, USPTO Acting Director Benoît Battistelli, EPO President Miklós Bendzsel, WIPO Director General Francis Gurry, and Thailand Deputy Prime Minister Prajin Juntong.

== IFIA Awards ==
The International Federation of Inventors' Associations (IFIA) Awards Recognizing outstanding achievements in innovation, invention, and technological advancements, these awards aim to support and encourage inventors by acknowledging their contributions to global progress and are selected by the IFIA Jury Board.

- Types of IFIA Awards IFIA grants various awards, including:

- IFIA Best Invention Award – Given to groundbreaking innovations in different fields.
- IFIA Woman Inventor Award – Recognizing outstanding female inventors.
- IFIA Young Inventor Award – Encouraging young innovators and students.
- IFIA Innovation Excellence Award – Awarded to organizations or institutions contributing significantly to innovation.
- IFIA Green Innovation Award – Recognizing sustainable and eco-friendly inventions.

- Award Criteria and Recognition

- Awards are presented at international exhibitions, conferences, Awards are presented at international exhibitions, conferences, and competitions organized or endorsed by IFIA.

- Winners receive certificates, medals, and global recognition.

- The selection process is based on patent, creativity, innovation, impact, and market potential.

== IFIA Magazine ==
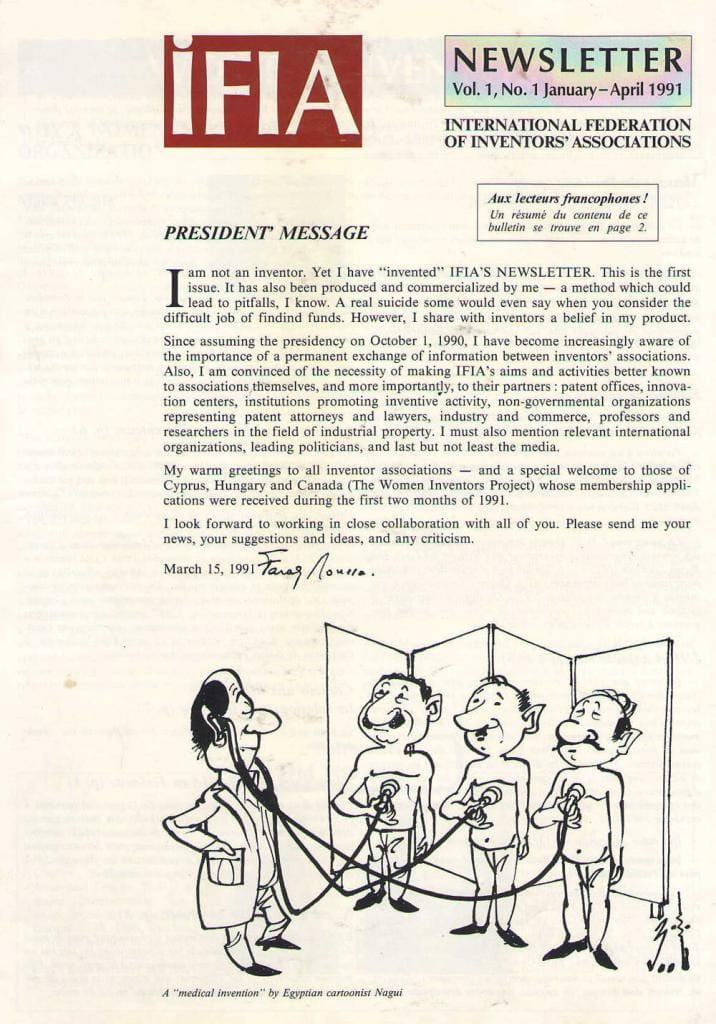
IFIA NEWSLETTER

The IFIA Magazine is the official publication of the International Federation of Inventors' Associations (IFIA). It serves as a platform to showcase innovation, inventions, and global activities within the IFIA network.

== IFIA INV Members ==
The INV Membership category within the International Federation of Inventors' Associations (IFIA)is designed to recognize individual inventors who contribute to the field of innovation and technological advancements.

== Sources of Revenue ==
The International Federation of Inventors' Associations (IFIA) generates revenue through various channels, including:

- Annual Membership Fees:Contributions from member organizations.
- Financial Support from International Organizations:Funding from higher-level international institutions.
- Sponsorships:Financial contributions from sponsors and partner organizations.
