= Horizontal inequality =

Horizontal inequality is the inequality—economical, social or other—that does not follow from a difference in an inherent quality such as intelligence, attractiveness or skills for people or profitability for corporations. In sociology, this is particularly applicable to forced inequality between different subcultures living in the same society, i.e. inequalities between culturally formed groups, not economically formed ones.

Horizontal inequalities increase the risk of violent conflict.

In economics, horizontal inequality is seen when people of similar origin, intelligence, etc. still do not have equal success and have different status, income and wealth.

Traditional economic theory predicts that horizontal inequality should not exist in a free market. However, horizontal inequality is observed in real and simulated 'free market' systems. The Pareto optimal economy is one traditional approach to the problem. Even in simulated systems, inequality of perfectly identical actors arises, to give "the rich and poor".

== Causes ==
There are three main causes of horizontal inequality; overt discrimination, exclusivity of public goods, and unequal access to resources. These resources consist of political, economic, and social resources. Lack of access to these resources leads to inequality of opportunity, which can then lead to inequality of outcome.

Limited mobility between groups causes horizontal inequality to persist.

=== Impact ===
Horizontal inequality can have a negative effect on mental health, due to one's self-image. There can often be negative externalities, depending on the group one is a part of. Identifying with a marginalized group can have negative effects on one's self-perception, due to implicit or explicit discrimination, as well as perceived discrimination (regardless of whether or not one is being discriminated against).

Disadvantaged cultural groups may react together, in the form of protests or riots over their collective situation.

In discussions of the effects of globalization, horizontal inequality in globalization's effect on the poor is used to argue against globalization. Some poor families feel negative effects from the process of globalization, even when other families that are horizontally equal benefit.

=== Other sociological connections ===
Horizontal measures of inequality differ from the standard vertical methods of measuring inequality in several ways. First, vertical measures deal with inequality over a range of individuals/households differentiated economically, whereas horizontal measures deal with groups of individuals/households at the same economic level whose inequality is differentiated by cultural factors. Additionally, horizontal inequality is measured as inherently multidimensional, whereas vertical inequality is rarely measured in a multidimensional way.

Horizontal inequality can be connected to various other sociological concepts, such as inequality of opportunity. Inequalities of opportunity are characteristics that shape a person's life in a way that is out of their control. Race, gender, and ethnicity are all examples of characteristics that can cause inequality of opportunity. This connects to horizontal inequality because each category contains different subcultures that live within the same society. For example, two people can be born into different subcultures within the same family by being male and female. Their sex at birth will contribute to the inequalities they experience throughout life, creating horizontal inequality between siblings.

== See also ==
- Vertical inequality
