= Ali Osat Hashemi =

Iranian Reformist Politician

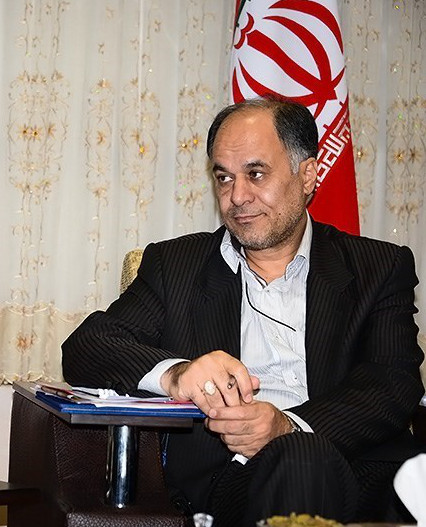
- Hashemi in Tasnim News Agency office, December 2013 – Zahedan

Chief of Iran Technical and Vocational Training Organization
- In office September 21, 2019 – September 8, 2021
- Appointed by: Mohammad Shariatmadari
- President: Hassan Rouhani
- Preceded by: Soleiman Pakseresht
- Succeeded by: Gholamhossein Hosseininia

CEO of Central Organization for Rural Cooperatives of Iran
- In office December 24, 2017 – May 6, 2018
- Appointed by: Mahmoud Hojjati
- President: Hassan Rouhani
- Preceded by: Hossein Safaei
- Succeeded by: Hossein Shirzad

Governor-general of Sistan and Baluchestan
- In office November 20, 2013 – November 5, 2017
- President: Hassan Rouhani
- Preceded by: Hatam Naroei
- Succeeded by: Danial Mohebi

Personal details
- Born: 1958 (age 67–68) Sonqor County
- Party: Iranian Reformists
- Occupation: Politician

Ali Osat Hashemi (Persian: علی اوسط هاشمی) is an Iranian reformist politician. He was born 1958 in Sonqor County, Kermanshah Province, Iran. He was the Deputy Minister of Iran's Ministry of Cooperatives, Labour, and Social Welfare and the head of the Iran Technical and Vocational Training Organization, from 2019 to 2021.

Former Deputy Minister of Iran's Ministry of Agriculture Jihad and former CEO of the Central Organization for Rural Cooperatives of Iran in the Government of Hassan Rouhani (2017–2021) and former Governor-general of Sistan and Baluchestan Province in the Government of Hassan Rouhani (2013–17) are among his previous responsibilities mentioned.

== Life and career ==
Ali Osat Hashemi was born in Sonqor County, Kermanshah Province, Iran around 1958, but his identity booklet states February 5, 1960, as birth date, which according to him the date is not valid. He grew up in a family with seven siblings and continued his education until his master's degree.

In 1979, during the Iranian Revolution, he was actively involved in this incident and became a veteran in these conflicts. After the victory of the Revolution, he joined the Islamic Revolutionary Guard Corps (IRGC) and served 14 months there, then served in service institutions such as the Imam Khomeini Relief Foundation and the Iranian Red Crescent Society. In 1982, he entered the Iran's Ministry of Interior and served in Governorate section. He also served as political deputy in three provinces of Iran, general political director in two provinces, general director of two provincial branch of National Organization for Civil Registration of Iran, political and security deputy in three provinces, Governor-general of Tehran and head of the Mostazafan Foundation.

He married in 1983 and has three sons.

== His officials ==
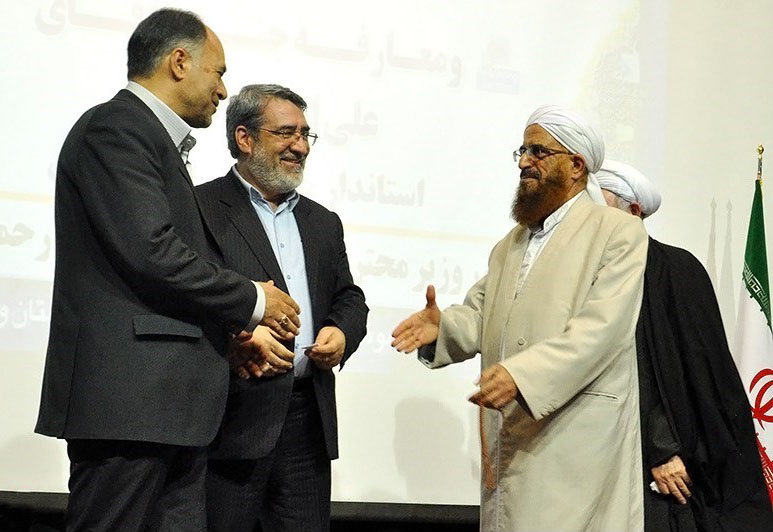
Introducing Ali Osat Hashemi as new govrner of Sistan and Baluchestan Province by Rahmani Fazli, former interior minister of Iran

He has served in various positions for the Iran government. Including:

- Head of the Iran Technical and Vocational Training Organization
- CEO of the Central Organization for Rural Cooperatives of Iran
- Governor-general of Sistan and Baluchestan Province
- Political and Security Deputy of Kurdistan Governorate
- Governor-general of Tehran
- Political and Security Deputy of Qazvin Governorate
- Governor-general of Gilan-e Gharb
- General Director of Political and Law Enforcement of Kermanshah Governorate
- General Director of Political and Law Enforcement of Chaharmahal and Bakhtiari Province Governorate
- Central prefect of Kangavar County
- Mayor of Kangavar County
- Director General of Civil Registry of Kurdistan Province
- Director General of Civil Registry of Yazd Province
- Head of Jihad of Construction of Sonqor County
- Chairman of the Coordinating Council for Combating Drug Trafficking in Tehran, Qazvin and Kurdistan Provinces
- Chairman of the Coordination Council for Combating Commodity and Currency Smuggling in Tehran, Kurdistan and Qazvin Provinces
- Head of various working groups and commissions (health, education, tourism, culture and art, physical education, labor, security and law enforcement) in the provinces of Tehran, Qazvin, Kurdistan, Chaharmahal and Bakhtiari and Kermanshah
- chairman of the board of Inquiry into the Violations of the Employees of the Governorates of Tehran, Qazvin, Kurdistan, Chaharmahal and Bakhtiari
- managing director of Eram Cultural and Artistic Association of Mostazafan Foundation
- Head of election campaign in Tehran, Qazvin and Kurdistan provinces

=== Achievements ===
- The first prize of the twelfth National Environmental Award of Iran
- Achieving the first rank of Tehran Education Council
- Achieving the first rank in the fight against drugs in the provinces of Kurdistan and Tehran

=== Plans ===
- Preparing a plan for organizing and aggregating rural and border areas of Iran
- Preparation of weapons and ammunition identification plan in Kermanshah, Kurdistan and Chaharmahal and Bakhtiari provinces

== See also ==
- Asadollah Alam
- Seyed Mahmood Hosseini
- Ahmad Mazani
- Shahrbanoo Amani
- Gholamreza Shariati
- Mohsen Safaei Farahani
- Mohammad Hossein Sharifzadegan
- Alireza Feyz
