= The National Festival of Entrepreneurs in Iran =

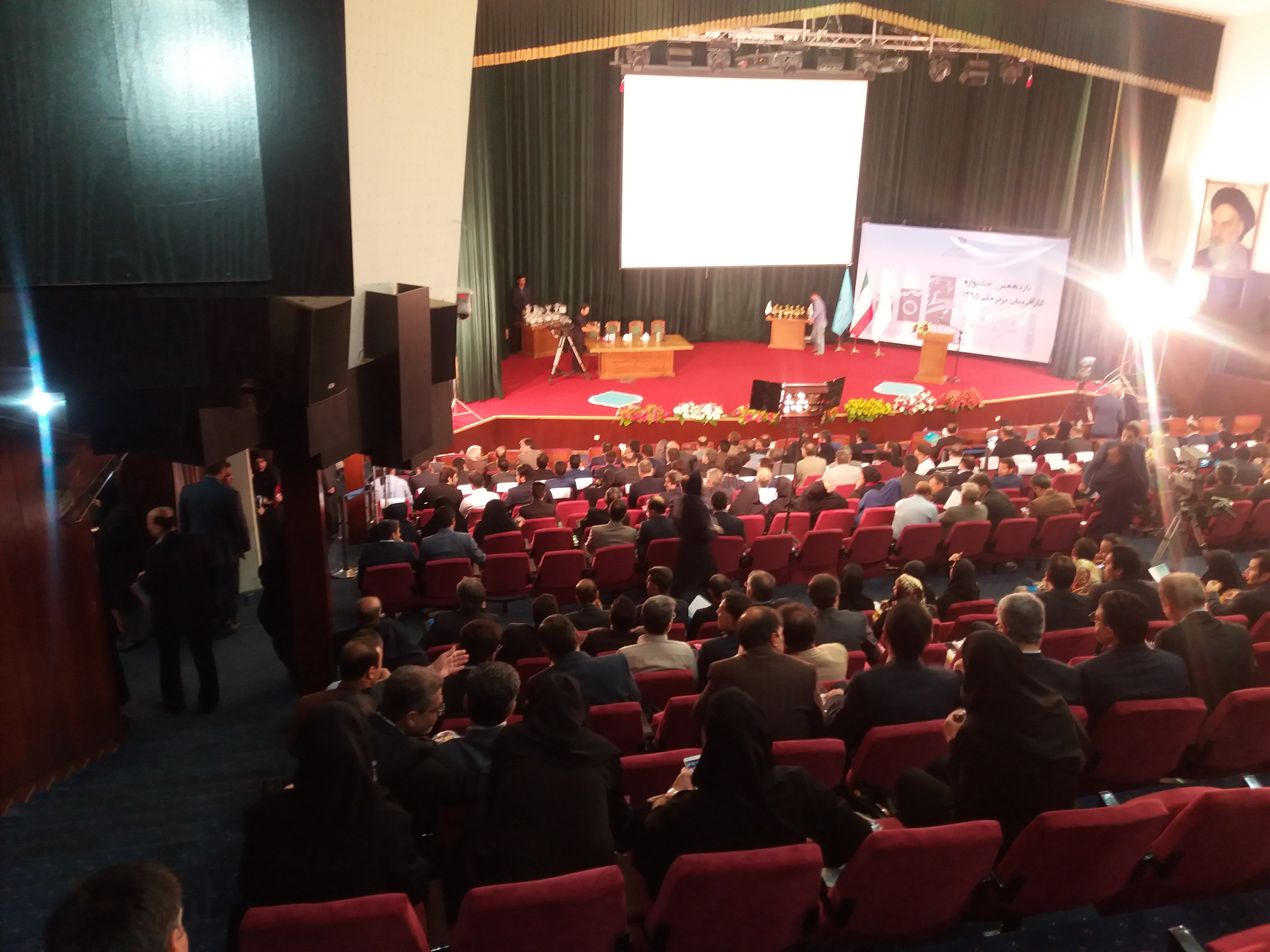
11th festival of Iranian entrepreneurs held in the Main Hall of The Ministry of Cooperatives, Labour, and Social Welfare. 2017

The National Festival of Entrepreneurs of Iran has been organizing festivals since 2006 by the Ministry of Co-operation, Labor and Social Welfare which has presented the top entrepreneurs at the national and provincial levels of Iran. These festivals, based on indicating jobs and facilities related, are designed to identify entrepreneurs, included of approximately 3,000 top entrepreneurs in the provinces and 130 top national entrepreneurs in various fields of economic sectors (industry, agriculture, and co-operational services) will be nominated to be rewarded. In different periods of time, the procedures and indicators for identifying entrepreneurs, have been updated on the basis of the country's major policies and technologies. Some terms and conditions have also been modified based on the needs of the country. The establishment of entrepreneurship centers in the provinces around the country, with the presence of provincial and national superior entrepreneurs and their participation with executive agencies as an entrepreneurial think tank, is one of the achievements of these festivals, which has resulted in the effective development of entrepreneurship in different regions of the country. The Provincial Entrepreneurship Centers, which will be selected and awarded as the top entrepreneurs, experts, in entrepreneurship in each province, are currently serving as the think tank to the governorate and additionally offer suggestions and plans to create employment-ships and entrepreneurial development in the country. They make appropriate decisions about the possible implications of decisions and policies. They also find the better solutions based on the scientific, experimental, technical and financial advantages of the top entrepreneurs; this clue are focused on the values of the government officials who can help improve the business environment in the provinces and, moreover, nationwide in the whole country of Iran. The main theme, logo, monument, and statue of this festival has been designed by Hesam Film and Animation Studio directed by Dr. Hesam Bani-Eghbal.

== The goals of the festival ==
- Promoting the culture of entrepreneurship, creativity and innovation.
- Identifying entrepreneurs across the country and selecting the best of them and introducing them as a model to the community, especially young people.
- Creating an atmosphere of interaction and cooperation among various economic actors in the industrial, agricultural and service sectors.
- Creating vitality and competition in business spaces, Enhancing the partnership and participatco-operationaleneurs in the country's economic development and promoting the culture of work and entrepreneurship.
- Encouraging entrepreneurship supporters to participate and invest in entrepreneurship programs and especially engage seriously with entrepreneurs and innovators present at the festival.
- Spiritual support from entrepreneurs to create a new business. The growth of self-esteem and self-esteem in youth. Awards, scope of participants, festival topics.

== Awards, scope of participants, festival topics ==
The manner and amount of awards selected by the provincial and national festival of top entrepreneurs will be determined by the proposal of the executive committee and the approval of the policy council. The range of participants and festival topics (groups and sectors) will be determined by the National Science Workshop and will be announced through the National Policy Council.

== Deputies ==
The ministry consists of six deputies as:

- Deputy for Coordination & International affairs
- Deputy for Labour Relations
- Deputu for Planning & Employment Policies
- Deputy for Social & Cultural affairs
- Deputy for Legal & Parliamentary affairs
- Deputy for Patronage

== See also ==
- Iranian labor law
- Iranian Labour News Agency
- Cabinet of Iran
- Government of Iran
  - Ministry of Welfare and Social Security (Iran)
  - Iran Technical and Vocational Training Organization
