= Abdolreza Mesri =

Iranian politician

- عبدالرضا مصری
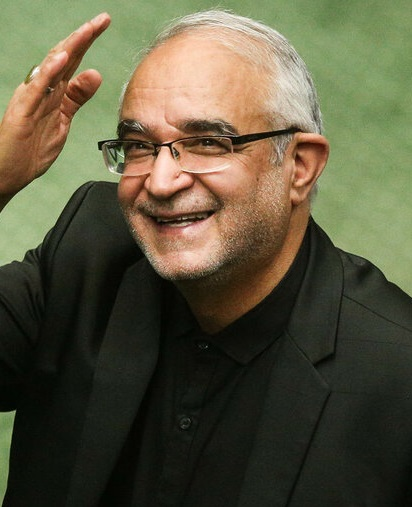

Member of Parliament of Iran
- Incumbent
- Assumed office 28 May 2012 Serving with Saeed Heidari Tayyeb and Mohammad Razm
- Constituency: Kermanshah
- Majority: 144,445 (42.30%)
- In office 27 May 2004 – 29 October 2006 Serving with Abbas-Ali Allahyari and Jahanbakhsh Amini
- Constituency: Kermanshah
- Majority: 39,443 (33.51%)

Ambassadors of Iran to Venezuela Accredited Ambassador to Guyana, Suriname and Trinidad and Tobago
- In office December 2009 – May 2012
- President: Mahmoud Ahmadinejad
- Preceded by: Seyyed Ahmad Serajzadeh
- Succeeded by: Hojjatollah Soltani

Minister of Welfare and Social Security
- In office 29 October 2006 – 3 September 2009
- President: Mahmoud Ahmadinejad
- Preceded by: Ali Yousefpour (acting)
- Succeeded by: Nad-Ali Olfatpour (acting)

Personal details
- Born: c. 1956 (age 69–70) Kermanshah, Iran
- Party: Islamic Coalition Party
- Other political affiliations: Popular Front of Islamic Revolution Forces
- Education: Geology
- Alma mater: Tarbiat Moallem University
- Cabinet: 9th Government
- Awards: Order of Francisco de Miranda (First class)

Military service
- Allegiance: Iran
- Branch/service: Revolutionary Guards
- Years of service: 1980's
- Unit: Cooperation Bonyad

Abdolreza Mesri (born 1956 in Kermanshah) is the current member of the Iranian Parliament representing Kermanshah district since 2012. He was also the member of Iranian Parliament from 2004 to 2006.

He was serving as Iran's ambassador to Venezuela from 2009 to 2012 and served as Iran's Minister of Welfare and Social Security from 2006 to 2009.

Political offices
Preceded by Parviz Kazemi	Minister of Welfare and Social Security; 2006–2009	Succeeded by Sadegh Mahsouli
Diplomatic posts
Preceded by Seyyed Ahmad Serajzadeh	Ambassadors of Iran to Venezuela; 2009–2012	Succeeded by Hojjatollah Soltani
Assembly seats
Preceded by Ali Motahari	2nd Vice Speaker of Parliament of Iran; 2019–2020	Succeeded by Ali Nikzad
Preceded by Ali Nikzad	2nd Vice Speaker of Parliament of Iran; 2021–2023	Succeeded by Mojtaba Zonnour
Preceded by Ali Nikzad	1st Vice Speaker of Parliament of Iran; 2023–2024	Succeeded by Hamid-Reza Haji Babaee
