= Ali Yousefpour =

Iranian journalist and politician

- علی یوسف‌پور
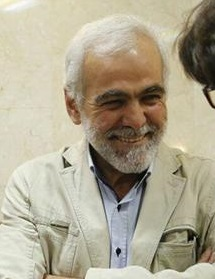

Acting Minister of Welfare and Social Security
- In office 25 September 2006 – 29 October 2006
- President: Mahmoud Ahmadinejad
- Preceded by: Parviz Kazemi
- Succeeded by: Abdolreza Mesri

Member of the Parliament of Iran
- In office 28 May 1984 – 28 May 1996
- Constituency: Ardal
- Majority: 33,412 (34.1%)

Personal details
- Born: c. 1955 (age 70–71) Naghan, Iran
- Party: Society of Devotees of the Islamic Revolution
- Education: Mechanical engineering Political science Strategic management
- Alma mater: Iran University of Science and Technology; Shahid Beheshti University; Supreme National Defense University

Military service
- Allegiance: Iran
- Branch/service: Revolutionary Guards
- Years of service: 1980–1984

Ali Yousefpour (Persian: علی یوسف‌پور) is an Iranian journalist and conservative politician who was formerly a member of the Parliament of Iran from 1984 to 1996. In 2006, he was appointed as the caretaker for the Ministry of Welfare and Social Security under administration of Mahmoud Ahmadinejad.

Yousefpour is editor of Siyaset-e Rooz newspaper (lit. 'the Daily Politics').

Media offices
| Unknown | Director of Siyaset-e Rooz unknown-2008 | Succeeded by Mohammad Pir-Ali |
