= Iranol Oil Company =

Oil company of Iran

IRANOL Oil Company
- Type: Public company TSE: NOLZ1; ISIN: IRO3NOLZ0001
- Industry: Petroleum industry, Petrochemical industry
- Founded: 2003
- Founder: National Iranian Oil Company
- Headquarters: Tehran, Iran
- Area served: West Asia
- Products: Lubricant, Motor oil, Grease
- Owner: Social Security Organization; Civil Servants Pension Fund; Astan Quds Razavi
- Website: www.iranol.ir

The Iranol Oil Company (Persian: شرکت نفت ایرانول) is an Iranian oil company based in Abadan and Tehran. It produces engine oils, greases, and lubricants and manufactures Bright Stock, an oil industry product. The company's products are part of the West Asian market for lubricants and related products. Iranol's facilities include a hydro-finishing and oil production unit at the Abadan Refinery and Tehran Refinery.

== History ==
As part of the Iranian government's privatization efforts and policies to reduce state ownership in non-monopoly sectors, the oil refining units of Tehran and Abadan refineries were transferred to several organizations: the Social Security Organization, the Civil Servants Pension Fund, and the Astan Quds Razavi. This transfer resulted in the establishment of Iranol Oil Company on December 1, 2002. In February 2012, the company was listed on the Tehran Stock Exchange. Iranol Oil Company operates in two main areas: Tehran Oil Refinery and Abadan Refinery.
