= Hotukdeals =

UK-based community deals platform

Hotukdeals is a UK-based community deals platform that allows users to share and evaluate online or in-store shopping offers supported by a team of expert editors.

== History ==
Hotukdeals was founded in 2004 by Sheffield University students Paul Nikkel and Jen Nikkel as a place for people to find and share real shopping tips. In 2014, Paul Nikkel (founder of hotukdeals) and Fabian Spielberger (founder of Mydealz) merged the companies to create Pepper.com and kick off what grew into a global deals platform.

Since then, hotukdeals has grown to over 1.6m users in the United Kingdom and its members have contributed to 2.1m threads and 26m posts. In 2015, the company opened its first office in Shoreditch, England. As of 2024, hotukdeals has over 2.8 million active deals on its platform, 2.6 million registered users and 47million comments. The company has over 2 million followers across its social media networks. Representatives from hotukdeals have appeared in national press to provide shopping-related insights and data. In the United Kingdom, Hotukdeals competes primarily with LatestDeals.co.uk.

== Community and user engagement ==
Hotukdeals is a free to join and free to use app and website. Hotukdeals has a large community of active users who submit and share deals with one another. Registered members can submit deals they come across, provide additional information, and participate in discussions about featured deals. The platform encourages transparency and relies on user voting to highlight the best deals, ensuring that the community plays a central role in curating content. Members can give and get genuine advice on deals, merchants, products and services. The Hotukdeals community allows users ask questions and share insights on deals and discount codes.

Registered members vote on deals and the very best deals are those which are voted "hot" by users. Conversely, if a deal or voucher is seen as unfavorable, the community can vote it cold. An upvote from a community member increases the "temperature" of the deal, while a down vote reduces it.
