= Bync =

- Type: Private company
- Industry: Electronic commerce
- Founded: 2012
- Founder: Ryan Bales
- Defunct: 2017
- Fate: Unknown
- Headquarters: Louisville, Colorado, United States
- Area served: United States, Canada
- Owner: Bync, Inc.
- Website: bync.com Archived December 2, 2016, at the Wayback Machine

Bync was an American online company that provided deals and coupons by syncing to a user's bank and credit cards to discover the user's favorite stores. The company was founded in 2012 by Ryan Bales and closed down around 2016. While it was operating Bync synced with 10,000 different credit card companies, banks and credit unions across the United States and Canada.

== History ==
Bync began as the online personal finance website Budgetable, which provided users with money management tools in addition to deals and coupons based on user spending habits. Development for Bync started in October 2012 when founder Ryan Bales chose to focus the product around spending-based deals. Bync publicly launched on 3 January 2013.

Its website went offline in early 2017.

== Products ==
Bync provides its users with personalized deals and coupons by syncing to user's bank and credit cards in order to use purchase history as a way to determine which stores the user shops at the most. Users are sent deal alerts via e-mail when one of their stores has a new deal or coupon.
