= Soleiman Pakseresht =

Iranian sociologist

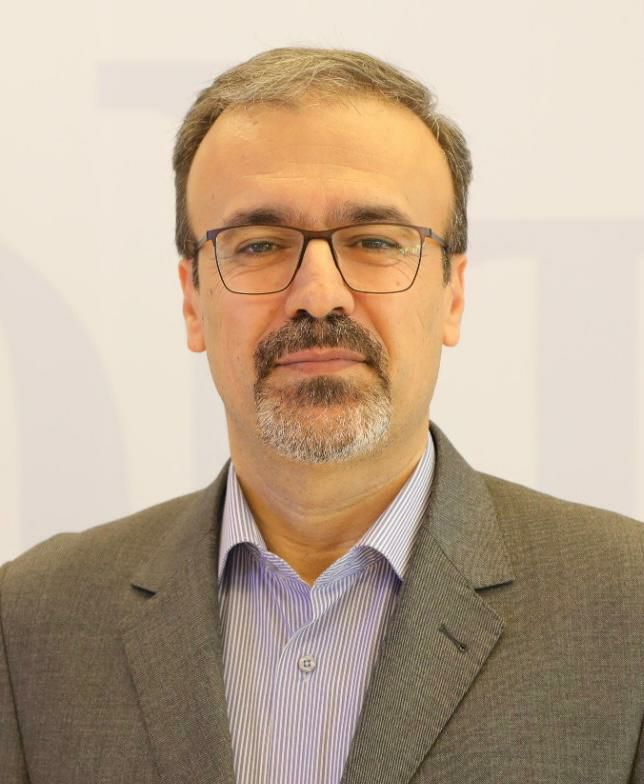
- Born: 23 August 1972 (age 54); Piranshahr

Academic background
- Education: Tarbiat Modares University

Academic work
- Institutions: Allameh Tabataba'i University, Bu-Ali Sina University, Ministry of Cooperatives, Labour, and Social Welfare, International Labour Organization
- Main interests: Social impact assessment

Soleiman Pakseresht (born 23 August 1972) is an Iranian sociologist and associate professor at Allameh Tabataba'i University whose work focuses on social impact assessment, political sociology and sociology of cyberspace. He previously taught at Bu-Ali Sina University.

== Career ==
Pakseresht is currently the head of the Higher Institute for Social Security Research. He is a former representative of the Ministry of Cooperatives, Labour, and Social Welfare in the International Labour Organization and also previously held positions such as the head of the Iran Technical and Vocational Training Organization, the cultural and social deputy of the Center for Strategic Studies and the director of applied research in the Iranian government delegation office. He is also a founder of the Iranian Students Polling Agency (ISPA).

== Books ==
- Social Capital in Iran: Status, Challenges and Strategies. Tehran: Center for Strategic Research
- Social Impact Analysis in Practice, Tehran: Office for Social and Cultural Studies of Tehran, Social and Cultural Deputy, Tehran Municipality
- Internet Consumption in Leisure Styles of Youth, Tehran: Research Center for Culture, Art and Communication Press
- The International Handbook of Social Impact Assessment: Conceptual and Methodological Advances, edited by Henk A. Becker and Frank Vanclay, Translated by Soleiman Pakseresht, Tehran: Hamshahri
