= Mohammad Hossein Sharifzadegan =

Iranian politician

Minister of Welfare and Social Security
- In office 14 July 2004 – 24 August 2005
- President: Mohammad Khatami
- Preceded by: Ministry established
- Succeeded by: Parviz Kazemi

Personal details
- Born: c. 1952 or 1953 (age 72–73) Hamedan, Iran
- Party: Islamic Iran Participation Front
- Relatives: Mir-Hossein Mousavi (brother-in-law)

Mohammad Hossein Sharifzadegan (Persian: محمدحسین شریف‌زادگان) is an Iranian reformist politician. He served as the head of Social Security Organization for three years before taking office as a minister. In February 2011, it was reported that he was one of several people being detained by security forces in Tehran for "security reasons".
