= Suzan Dolatabadi =

Personal information
- Full name: Suzan Dolatabadi
- Born: 17 August 1975 Tehran, Iran

Cycling career
- Sport: Cycling
- Discipline: Indoor cycling
- Role: Cyclist

Suzan Dolatabadi (born 17 August 1975) is an Iranian cyclist and sports official. She set a record by cycling continuously for six hours on an indoor cycling bike, which was recorded in a record book.

== Career ==
Dolatabadi is considered a founder of indoor cycling in Iran. In 2020, she set a record by cycling for three hours at 110 RPM.

Dolatabadi has held several administrative positions in Iranian sports organizations. She served as acting head of the Indoor Cycling Committee of the Cycling Federation. She also served as vice president for women's affairs of the Footvolley Federation. In 2021, she was appointed head of the Committee for Virtual and Simulator Sports. In 2023, she was appointed head of the country's Indoor Cycling Committee.

== Views ==
In an interview with ILNA, Dolatabadi discussed the approval of a hand movement technique while cycling. She said that after a long effort, she obtained approval on 1 January to perform the movement, although it had previously not been approved in spinning. She also stated that the discipline was under the supervision of the Federation of Public Sports and would not be transferred to the Cycling Federation.

Dolatabadi added that although she was no longer the head of the Spinning Committee, she continued to work to develop the discipline. She said that existing instructors and coaches could continue their work and that she did not intend to make immediate changes to the field.

Dolatabadi also said that she had collected and translated books on spinning in an effort to update the discipline's educational materials. According to her, the books had been given to colleagues for safekeeping but were later published under their names. She also expressed concern about what she described as a decline in spinning.
