= Darou Pakhsh =

Iranian pharmaceutical company

Darou Pakhsh Holding Company
- Company type: Public
- Traded as: TSE: DARO1; ISIN: IRO1DARO0008
- Industry: Pharmaceuticals, chemicals
- Founded: 1956; 70 years ago (as Darou Pakhsh); 1997 (as Darou Pakhsh Holding)
- Headquarters: Tehran, Iran
- Area served: Worldwide
- Products: Veterinary drugs, diagnostic imaging, general and specialty medicines, women's health products, over-the-counter drugs, diabetes care, pesticides, plant biotechnology
- Owner: TPICO (74.5%)
- Website: www.dpholding.com

Karkhanjat Darupakhsh Company is the largest pharmaceutical company in Iran, 74% of whose shares belong to Social Security Investment Company (Shasta).

Daropakhsh Pharmaceuticals Company operates in various fields of human medicine, veterinary medicine, biology, herbal medicine and health medicine.[1] The subject of the company's activity is the production, preparation and import of human medicines, veterinary medicine, milk powder, baby food, food, medical supplies, cosmetics, laboratory and their distribution and sale throughout the country, as well as the purchase and sale of raw materials and providing Packaging services.

Established in 1963 under the name of Daropakhsh pharmaceutical factory and producing 20 types of drugs including tablets and syrups and injectable products under license 1978 under the ownership of the Ministry of Health and production of generic products 1980, transformation in the organizational structure 1992 under the ownership of the Social Security Organization 1993 change from private to public shares In 1998, one of the subsidiaries of Darupakhsh Company named Karkhanjat Darupakhsh Company

(public shares)

Darou Pakhsh Holding Company (Persian: شرکت کارخانجات داروپخش, Shirkæt-e Karxanujat-e Darvipaxesh, lit. drug distribution company) is a major pharmaceutical company in Iran. The company is majority-owned by the Social Security Organization of Iran. The company manufactures, distributes, imports and exports finished products and pharmaceutical raw materials. Darou Pakhsh has an annual turnover of US$400m and claims to have the largest research and development operation of any Iranian drug firm. The company formed a plasmapheresis joint venture with a German medical firm, Biotest AG, in early 2004. Darou Pakhsh is listed on the Tehran Stock Exchange.

== History ==
Initially, the plant had been designed to produce 20 dosage forms.

== See also ==
- Pharmaceutical industry in Iran
