= Healthcare in Iran =

Historical development of life expectancy in Iran

Healthcare in Iran is based on three pillars: the public-governmental system, the private sector, and NGOs. The healthcare and medical sector's market value in Iran was almost US$24 billion in 2002 and $24.3 billion in 2008, and is forecast to rise to US$96 billion in 2017 due to population growth. With a population of 80 million (2017), Iran is one of the most populous countries in West Asia. The country faces the common problem of other young demographic nations in the region, which is keeping pace with growth of an already huge demand for various public services. The young population will soon be old enough to start new families, which will boost the population growth rate and subsequently the need for public health infrastructure and services. Total healthcare spending is expected to rise, reflecting the increasing demand on medical services. Total health spending was equivalent to 6% of GDP in Iran in 2017. About 90% of Iranians have some form of health insurance. Iran is also the only country with a legal organ trade. However, the legal character of organ donations is deemed to be a gifting of organs and not their sale and purchase.

According to the World Health Organization (WHO), as of 2000, Iran ranks 58 in healthcare and 93 in health-system performance. In 2016, Bloomberg News ranked Iran 30th most efficient healthcare system ahead of the United States and Brazil. The report shows life expectancy in Iran is 75.5 years and per capita spending on healthcare is $346. The health status of Iranians has improved over the last two decades. Iran has been able to extend public health preventive services through the establishment of an extensive primary health care network. As a result, child and maternal mortality rates have fallen significantly, and life expectancy at birth has risen remarkably. Infant (IMR) and under-five (U5MR) mortality have decreased to 28.6 and 35.6 per 1,000 live births respectively in 2000, compared to an IMR of 122 per 1,000 and a U5MR of 191 per 1,000 in 1970. Immunization of children is accessible to most of the urban and rural population.

Beginning in 2020, Iran has entered a severe medical crisis, which includes shortages in medication, soaring prices for medical treatment and a mass exodus of medical professionals.

== Health services ==
Demography of Iran - population pyramid

IRAN: Healthcare (Source: EIU)	2005	2006	2007	2008	2009	2010
Life expectancy, average (years)	70.0	70.3	70.6	70.9	71.1	71.4
Healthcare spending (% of GDP)	4.2	4.2	4.2	4.2	4.2	4.2
Healthcare spending ($ per head)	113	132	150	191	223	261

The largest healthcare delivery network is owned and run by the Ministry of Health and Medical Education (MOHME) through its network of health establishments and medical schools in the country. MOHME is in charge of provision of healthcare services through its network, medical insurance, medical education, supervision and regulation of the healthcare system in the country, policymaking, production and distribution of pharmaceuticals, and research and development. Additionally, there are other parallel organisations such as Medical Services Insurance Organizations (MSIO) that have been established to act as a relief foundation as well as an insurance firm. Some hospitals, such as Mahak for children's cancer, are run by charitable foundations.

According to the last census that Statistical Centre of Iran undertook in 2003, Iran possesses 730 medical establishments (e.g. hospitals, clinics) with a total of 110,797 beds, of which 488 (77,300 beds) are directly affiliated and run by the MOHME, 120 (11,301 beds) are owned by the private sector, and the rest belong to other organisations, such as the Social Security Organization of Iran (SSO). There were about seven nurses and 17 hospital beds per 10,000 population.

An extensive network of public clinics offers primary health care at low cost. In rural areas, each village or group of villages has a "health house" staffed by community health workers, locals trained in preventive healthcare methods such as nutrition, family planning, taking blood pressure, prenatal care, immunization, and monitoring environmental conditions such as water quality. Each health house is equipped with an examination room and sleeping quarters, and has a staff of one man and one or more women, all of whom are from the villages they serve. These are the population's first point of contact with the health care system. Those with more complex illnesses are referred to rural health centers, which are staffed by a physician, technician, and administrator. Similar primary health posts also exist in urban areas. Those in need of more complex care, including surgical services, are referred to hospitals. Iran's primary healthcare system has been rated as "excellent" by UNICEF.

The Ministry of Health and Medical Education (MOHME) operates public hospitals, both general and specialty hospitals, throughout Iran. Public hospitals are typically under the direct management of universities. In most large cities, well-to-do persons use private clinics and hospitals that charge high fees. In 2000, 94% of the population could access local health services, according to the WHO. Access ranged from 86% in rural areas to 100% in urban areas. Between 80% and 94% of the population could access affordable essential medicines in 1999.

=== Coverage ===
The Social Security Organization is responsible for insuring employed citizens in urban areas and their dependents, with the exception of government workers. All salaried and wage workers are covered, as are self-employed persons who voluntarily join. It also insures many old-age pensioners. The Medical Service Insurance Organization covers government employees, students, and inhabitants of rural areas. The Imam Khomeini Relief Foundation insures the poor who are not covered by other insurance schemes, while the Military Personnel Insurance Organization provides health insurance to members of the armed forces. Beyond these schemes, there are a number of private and semi-public insurance programs that cover the more affluent members of society.

More than 90% of the population has health insurance, and the government has made universal coverage by 2018 a priority. In general, health insurance covers 70% of the cost of drugs on the insurers' coverage list, and 90% of public hospital costs, with extra provision for those with rare diseases or in remote areas.

Since 2009, a new government plan called "the comprehensive insurance plan" provides basic coverage to all Iranians.

In 2023, The Iran News Update quoted a 2022 report from the Iranian Statistics Center reinforcing the statement that the regime's policies have made adequate healthcare a commodity that only wealthy families can afford. As a result of the new policies, low-income families face severe difficulties in obtaining essential medications and a large segment of the population, including many senior citizens, has resorted to the dangerous trend of self-treatment. According to a report by Hammihan, because of the soaring medical expenses, many people refuse hospital treatment or they leave the hospital before paying for the medications they had received.

=== Workforce ===
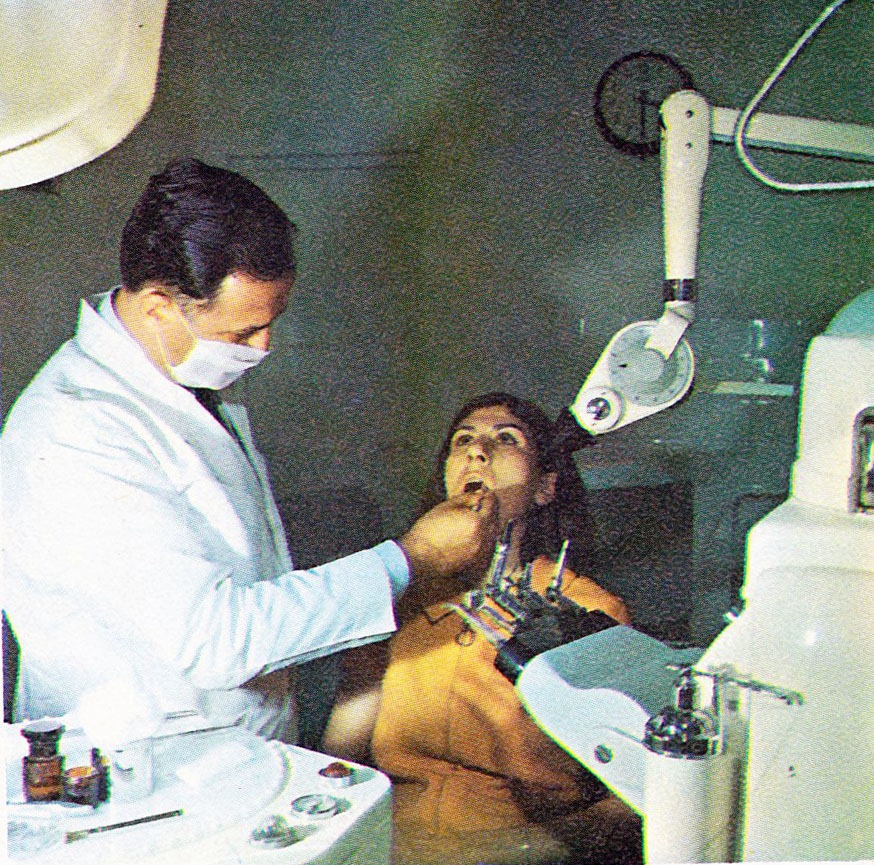
Dental care facility in Iran (c. 1970)

Iran has been very successful in training/educating the necessary human resources for its health system. The system of almost 30 years ago where the country was facing a shortage of all kinds of skilled personnel in the health and medical sector has been completely changed into one in which the necessary professionals now completely suffice the country's needs. There are now 488 government funded hospitals in Iran. There were 0.5–1.1 physicians per 1000 population in 2004 according to various estimates (about 46 percent of physicians were women).

Between 2020 and 2025, Iran experienced a large-scale exodus of healthcare professionals, with approximately 16,000 doctors leaving the Islamic Republic. The migration is due to the government's scrutiny of doctors who treated patients injured during the nationwide protests over the death of Mahsa Amini, in addition to high taxes, low salary, lack of job security, and strict enforcement of the hijab law, among other factors.

Healthcare system in Iran (2011)
Medical Schools	51
Medical Students	1 million
Professors of Medicine	20,000
Hospital Beds	120,000
Village Clinics	20,000
Doctors	100,000
Nurses	170,000

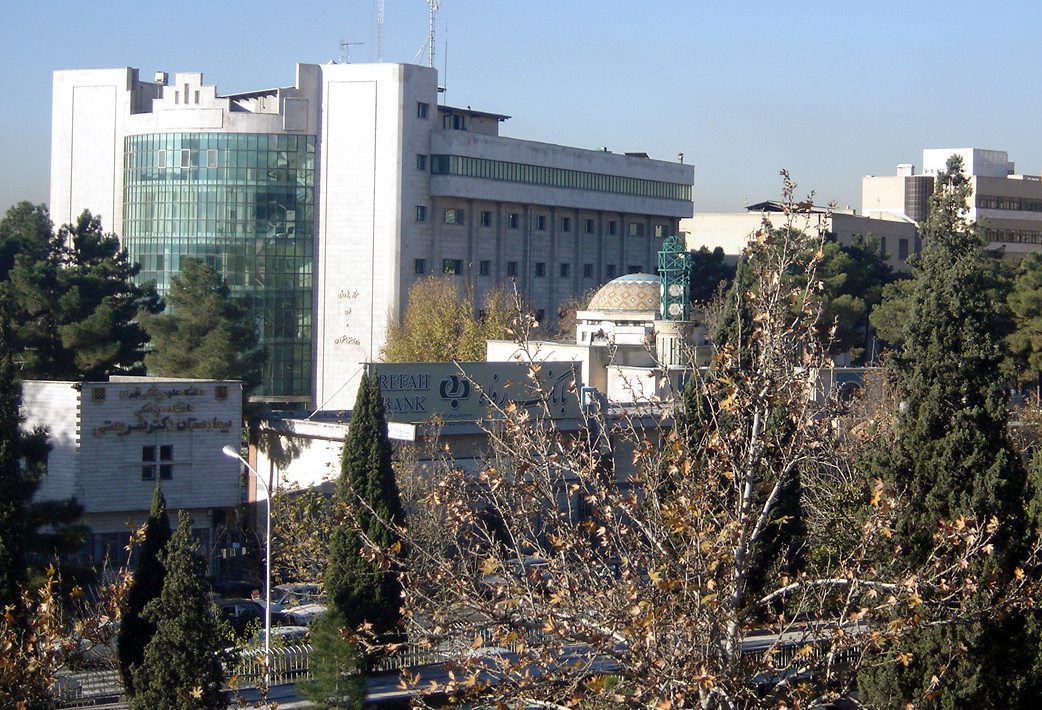
Shariati Hospital

Kasra Hospital

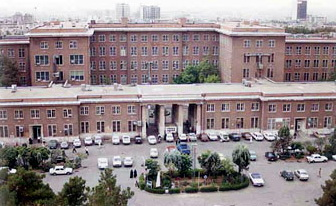
Imam Khomeini hospital

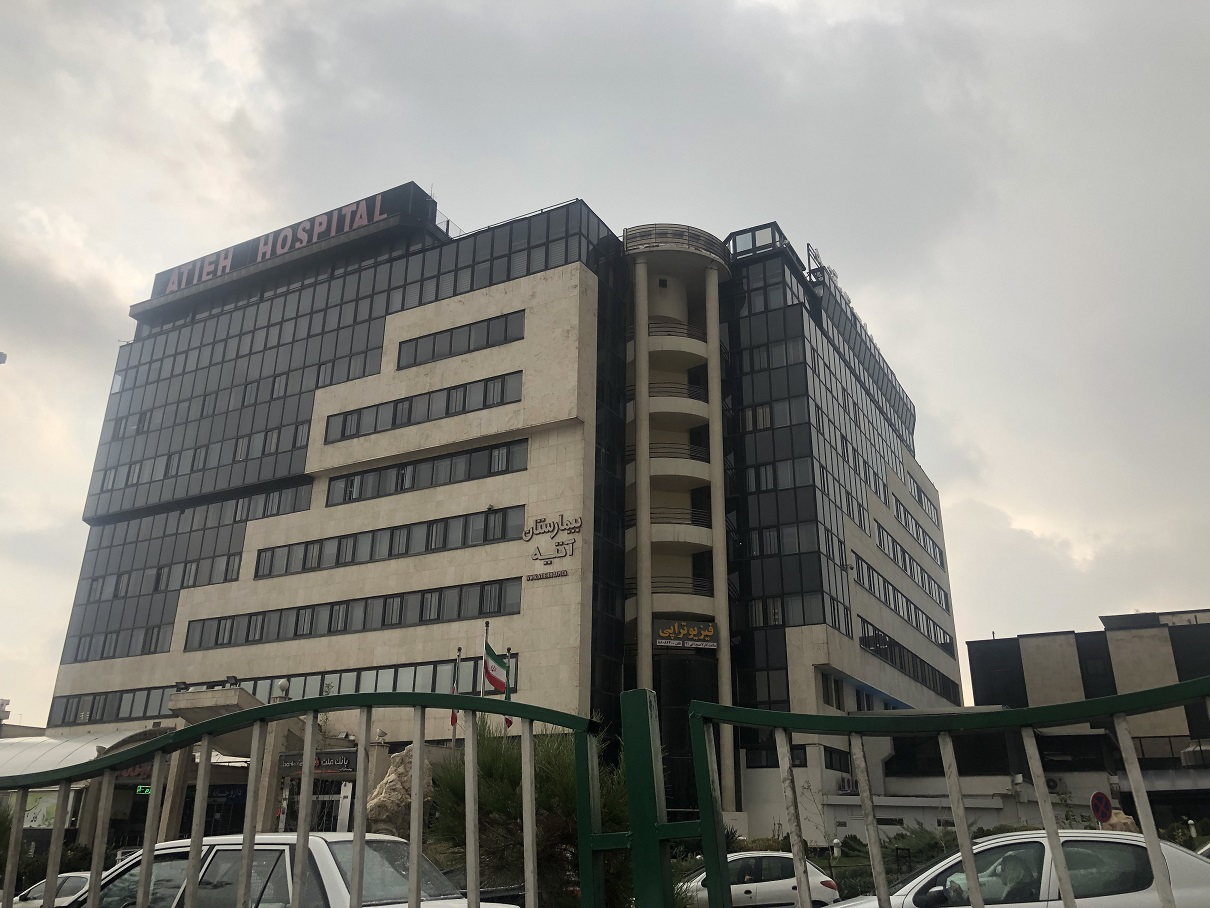
Atieh hospital

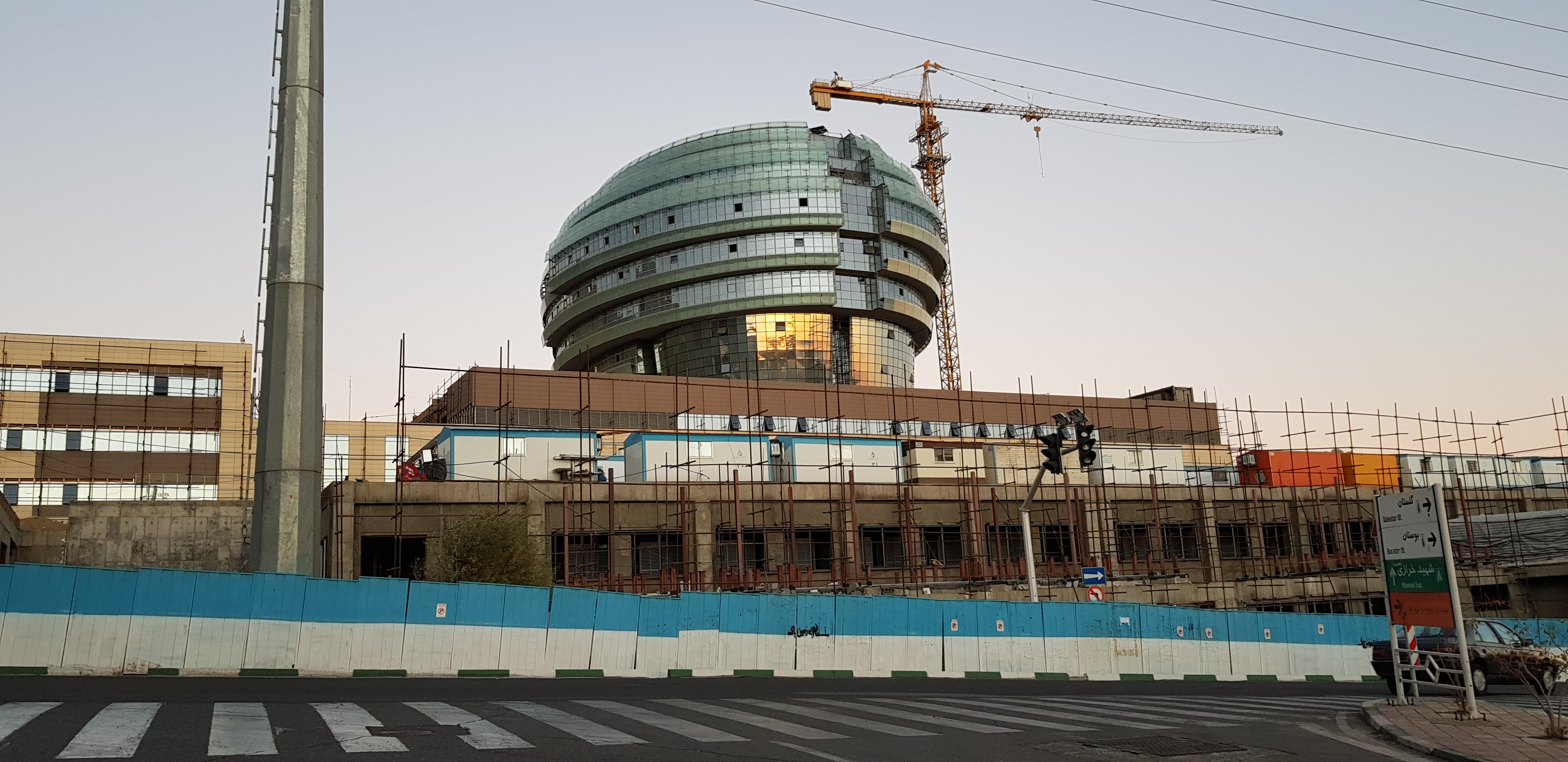
INI hospital

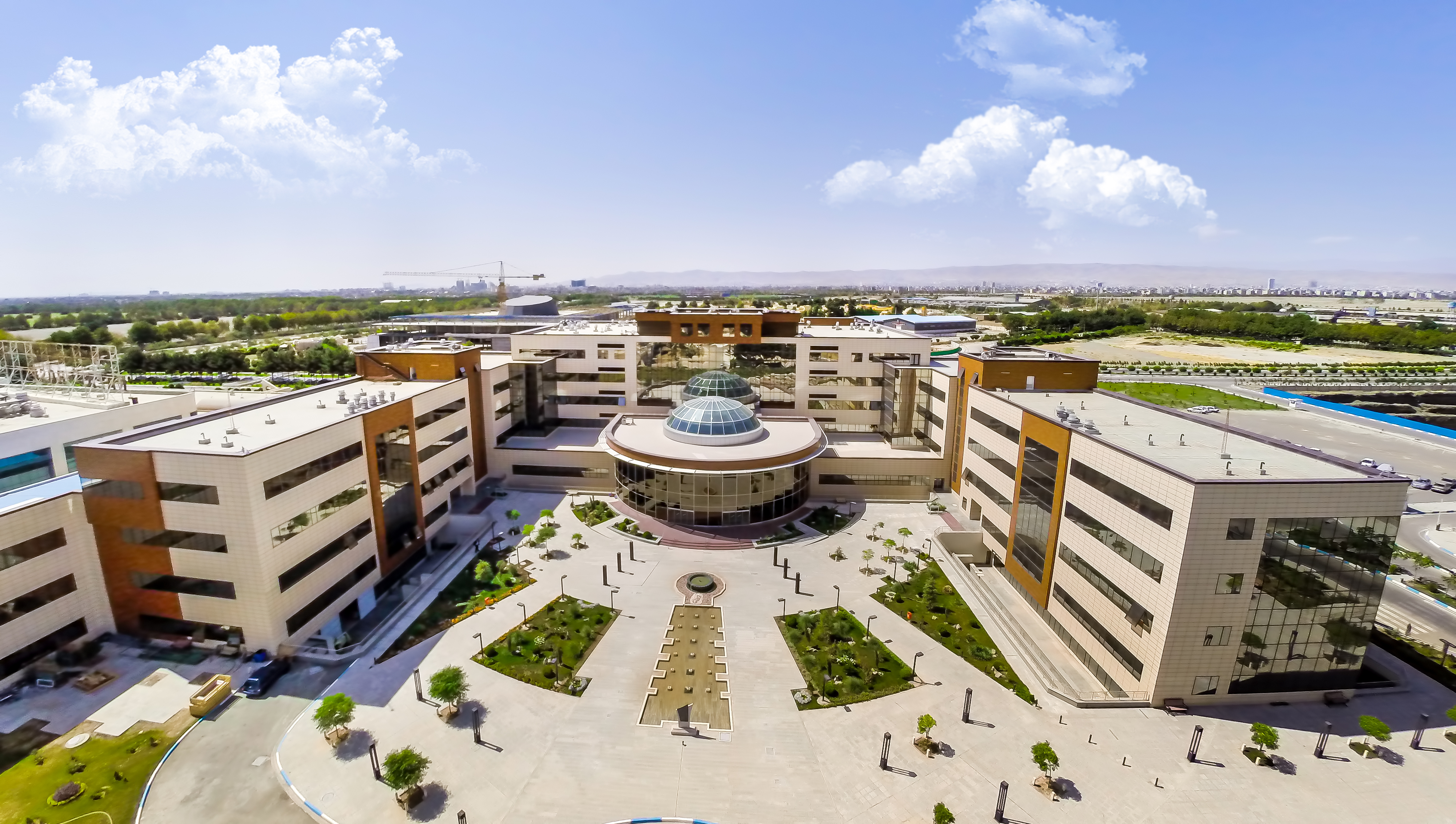
Razavi hospital

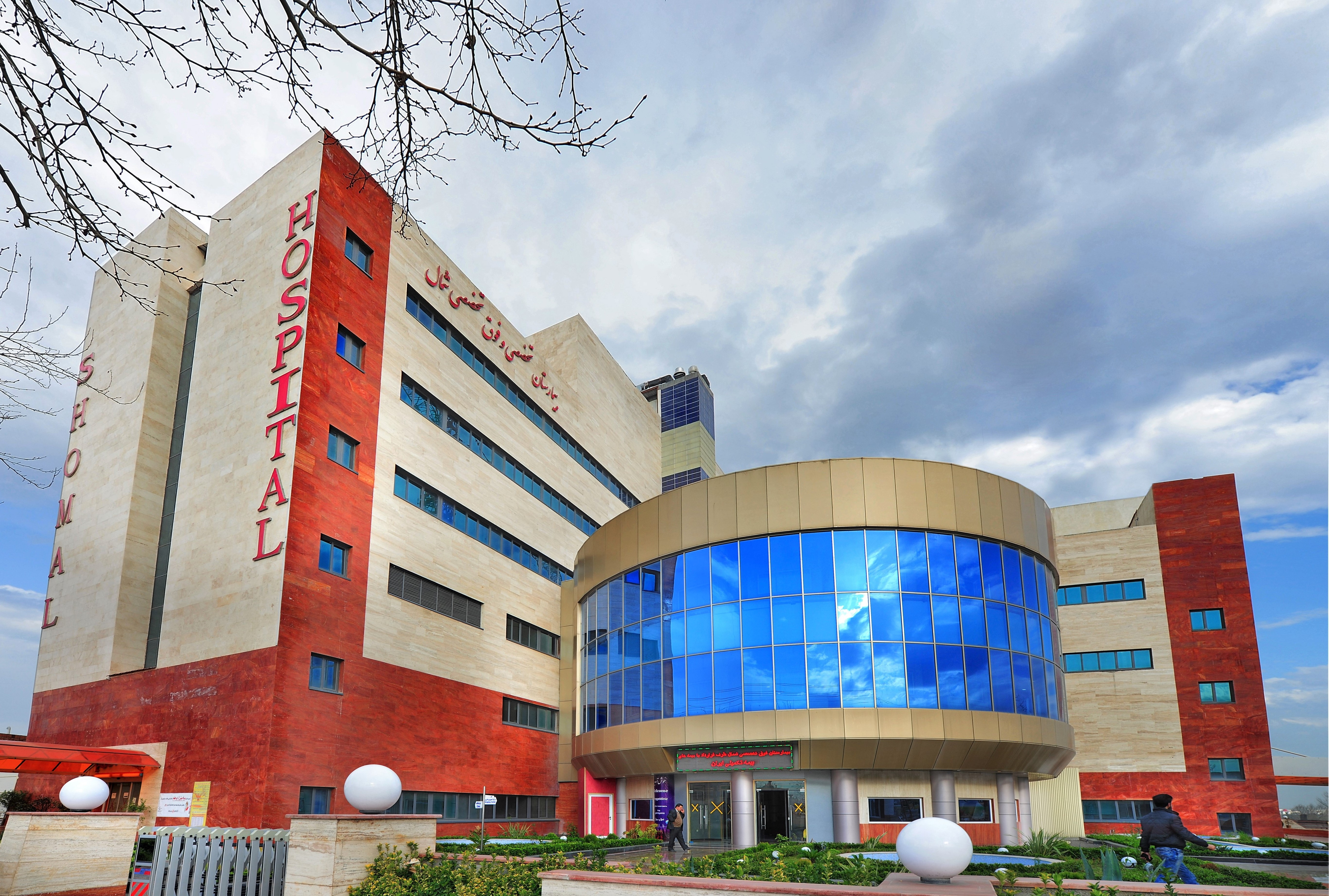
Shomal hospital

However, access and availability of health care continues to be somewhat limited in lesser developed provinces where the health indices are also lower as compared to national averages. The country is in an epidemiologic transition and faces double burden of the diseases. New emerging threats should also be considered. The demographic and epidemiological transition underway will have a significant effect on the pattern of morbidity and mortality in the near and distance future, especially as it affects the emergence of chronic non-communicable diseases and the health problems of an aging population.

=== Development ===
Although overall improvements have been achieved in all health areas since the 1979 revolution, the present challenging economic conditions of the country, combined with rapid advances in medical technology and information technology, individuals’ expectations, and the young demographic of the population will undoubtedly challenge the sustainability of past improving trends.

==== Medical tourism ====
Iran has a high potential of attracting tourists for medical services. Apart from the price, which is considerably lower, comparing to other countries in the same region, the quality of medical services in Iran are quite pleasing. Iran has an educated and experienced medical workforce. Medical specialists are professional and supported by a qualified nursing system. Iran also has a very active pool of medical researchers.

In 2012, 30,000 people visited Iran each year to receive medical treatment. Most health tourists were from Azerbaijan, Turkmenistan, Iraq, Turkey, Kuwait, Oman and Pakistan.

== Pharmaceuticals ==
The pharmaceutical industry in Iran began in its modern form in 1920 when the Pasteur Institute of Iran was founded. Iran has a well-developed pharmaceutical production capability, however, the country still relies on imports for raw materials and many specialized drugs. The standards regarding pharmaceutical products are determined and modified by the Pharmacopeia Council. As of 2019, Iran says it produces 80-90% of the raw materials needed inside the country. These include microplates, omeprazole, tamsulosin hydrochloride, naltrexone base, sitagliptin phosphate, and pioglitazone in various sizes.

Iran's Ministry of Health and Medical Education (MOHME) has a mission to provide access to sufficient quantities of safe, effective and high quality medicines that are affordable for the entire population. Since the 1979 revolution, Iran has adopted a full generic-based National Drug Policy (NDP), with local production of essential drugs and vaccines as one of the main goals.

Although over 85 percent of the population use an insurance system to reimburse their drug expenses, due to the severe decline in Iranian economy, in 2018 the government heavily subsidized pharmaceutical production/importation in order to increase affordability of medicines. This tended also to increase overconsumption, overprescription and misuse of drugs, much like the abuse of pharmaceutical opioids in Iran such as the heavily prescribed codeine for moderate to severe pain. The regulatory environment of the country is rather strict on the import of drugs and pharmaceuticals towards companies that intend to enter into the market for the first time. The Ministry of Health and Medical Education is the main stakeholder of pharmaceutical affairs in the country.

In 2022, the Iranian government under Ebrahim Raisi halted the subsidies for the production of food and medicine, forcing producers to pay seven times more for the import of raw materials, thereby crippling domestic production of medicines. This has caused a severe shortage in essential pharmaceutical products in local medical establishments, though the regime's pharmaceutical companies have continued to increase their profits by the production of sports supplements. in 2022, the Iranian Labour News Agency quoted Bahram Daraei, the regime’s head of the Iranian food and drug organization, as saying that the price increase of imported drugs was up to 6 times its original cost "and domestically produced drugs increased in price by 30 to 100 percent, depending on the amount of raw material supply currency". Both Iranian media and government officials have predicted that drug prices will continue to climb up to 700 percent. The rising medical costs for Iranian consumers has pushed thousands of those in need of treatment to the brink of bankruptcy. The shortage of medicine resulting from the price increase includes basic medical necessities, such as painkillers, IV fluids, antibiotics, anti-anxiety medication, Alendronic (bone density) and Omeprazole (stomach issues), as well as medicines with higher stakes, such as insulin, medications for asthma and Chronic Obstructive Pulmonary Disease (COPD), Melphalan and Thiotepa (chemotherapy), Factor 8 (haemophilia), Interferon Beta and Diphosel (Multiple Sclerosis).

=== Market ===
In 2006, 55 pharmaceutical companies in Iran produce more than 96 percent (quantitatively) of medicines on the market, worth $1.2 billion annually. Iran's pharmaceutical market is estimated to be worth $1.87 billion (2008), $2.31 billion (2009), $3.26 billion (2011), $3,57 billion (2013) and $3.65bn by 2013 (projected).

The drug market in Iran is heavily in favour of generic medicines, which contributed US$1.23bn to the total in 2009, with patented drugs at US$817mn and OTC medicines at US$262mn.

The market share of local production (value-wise) has declined from 85.2% to 63.4% over the past 8 (Iranian) years (2009). In this period the value of importation has jumped from 14.8% to 36.6%. The government imposes 90% tariff on the import of drugs.

As of 2015, Iran's share of global biotechnology products market is half a billion US dollar. In 2019, Iranian companies were able to produce 80-90% of the raw materials needed inside the country.

==== Products ====
Iran has produced a wide range of pharmaceuticals for the treatment of cancer, diabetes, infection and depression.

Iran is the first country in the East Mediterranean region which has the technical and scientific capability to export vaccines to various world countries. Iran will gain self-sufficiency in vaccine production by 2014. As of 2019, Iran produced 8 out of the 18 main vaccines for humans. In 2020-2021, amid the COVID-19 pandemic in Iran, Iran developed multiple COVID-19 vaccines with five that have received emergency use authorization (COVIran Barekat, Pasteurcovac, FAKHRAVAC, COVAX-19 and Razi Cov Pars).

The new drugs launched in Iran for the treatment of MS include an interferon beta-1b by CinnaGen.

Iranian researchers have developed 41 types of anti-cancer medications, overcoming the need for importing pricey cancer drugs from abroad (2011).

According to the Food and Drug Administration in 2014, trade in counterfeit commercial drugs has become more lucrative than dealing in illegal narcotics. Most of which come from Pakistan. Drugs for sexual enhancement, weight control, aesthetics, height enhancement, hair growth and body building are among the more prevalent fake drugs on the market.

===== Innovation =====
In recent years several drugmakers are gradually developing the ability to innovate, away from generic drugs production itself.

Iran has around 8000 species of plant life and researches indicate that more than 2300 species have remedial characteristics or can be used as cosmetic products; only 100-300 of which are being used in pharmaceutical industries at present. Iran has 80 percent of the world medicinal herbs. Due to lack of required technology, they are exported raw and in limited quantities to foreign markets.

=== Pharmaceutical companies ===
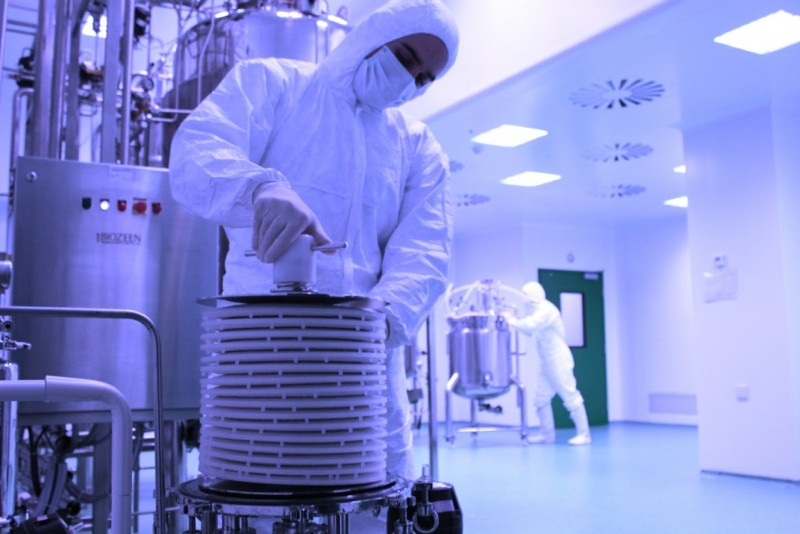
Inside AryoGen company's production line.

The Social Security Investment Co. (SSIC), which is affiliated to the Ministry of Welfare, was reported in 2008 to be Iran's largest holding company, owning and controlling 22 pharmaceutical manufacturing companies and possessing a 40% share of Iran's total pharmaceutical production.

The leading pharmaceuticals company is Darou Pakhsh, which is majority-owned by the Social Security Organization. The company manufactures, distributes, imports and exports finished products and pharmaceutical raw materials. Darou Pakhsh has an annual turnover of US$400m and claims to have the largest research and development operation of any Iranian drug firm. The company formed a plasmapheresis joint venture with a German medical firm, Biotest AG, in early 2004.

The Razi Institute for Serums and Vaccines and the Pasteur Institute of Iran are leading regional facilities in the development and manufacture of vaccines.

The Barkat Pharmaceutical Group is a major pharmaceutical holding that supplied 14% of the pharmaceutical market of Iran in 2016.

Iranian pharmaceutical manufacturers are reported to be disadvantaged by the government's poor intellectual property protection regime and lack of foreign direct investment.

== Medical equipment ==
The Department of Medical Equipments in the Ministry of Health and Medical Education (MOHME) is responsible for supervising imports in this segment, but the import and distribution of such equipment is mostly handled by the private sector.

Iran MED and Iran LAB are the main annual exhibitions relating to medical and laboratory equipment in Tehran.

U.S. sanctions against Iran do not apply to medical equipment or pharmaceuticals.

There are over 100 Iranian companies representing the international suppliers in this market.

== See also ==
- Family planning in Iran
- List of hospitals in Iran
- Medicine in Iran
- State Welfare Organization of Iran
- Zabol Medical Science University
