= Civil Servants Pension Fund =

Iranian governmental organization

Civil Servants Pension Fund (CSPF) is an Iranian independent legal entity under the governance of the Ministry of Welfare and Social Security, and run as an insurance company. This organization is responsible for the affairs related to the retirement of Iran's civil servants. The regular military, law enforcement agencies, and the Islamic Revolutionary Guard Corps, Iran's second major military organization, have their own pension systems.

Iran did not legislate in favor of a universal social protection, but in 1996, the Center of the Statistics of Iran estimated that more than 73% of the Iranian population was covered by social security. Membership in the social security system for all employees is compulsory.

== Beneficiaries ==
In 2012, CSPO had 1.1 million pensioners. CSPO's beneficiaries include:

1. Civil servants covered by Management of Government Services Law.
2. Faculty members of universities & institutes of higher education employed as tenure teaching staff.
3. Judges employed by judiciary Branch and Ministry of Justice covered by their respective rules and regulations.
4. Tenure diplomats of Ministry of Foreign Affairs covered by their respective rules & regulations.
5. Tenure employees of municipalities, excluding mayors.
6. Contract employees of executive branch requesting to be covered by civil servants Pension Fund.
7. The self-employeds (bought out employees of Ministry of Roads and article 147 of Fourth Development Plan.)

== Funding ==
The pension systems is based on the defined benefit which is the standard model (vs the defined contribution model). In 2012, CSPO had 1 million public employees contributing to the fund. The government is also supporting financially the CSPO. Due to the reduced amount of resources CSPO gathers from public employees, the system now relies more on government resources.

In the future, the system will no longer rely on the government budget, and shift focus toward a (privately) funded system. The pension system will have three major pillars such as:

1. Social insurance,
2. Social support,
3. Complementary and supplementary retirement insurance.

== Investments ==
Civil Pension Fund Investment Company is the investment arm of CSPO. As of 2012, the fund's investments allocation was as follows:

1. Chemical and petrochemical sectors: 31%,
2. Oil and gas companies: 17% (e.g. Iranol and Pasargad)
3. Transportation and communications: 11% (e.g. the Islamic Republic of Iran Shipping Lines (IRISL), Aseman Airlines)
4. Tourism (e.g. Iran Touring & Tourism Company.)

== See also ==
- Government of Iran
- Ministry of Welfare and Social Security (Iran)
- Social Security Organization (Iran)
- Iranian labor law
- Healthcare in Iran
- Bonyad
