= Parviz Kazemi =

Iranian politician

- پرویز کاظمی
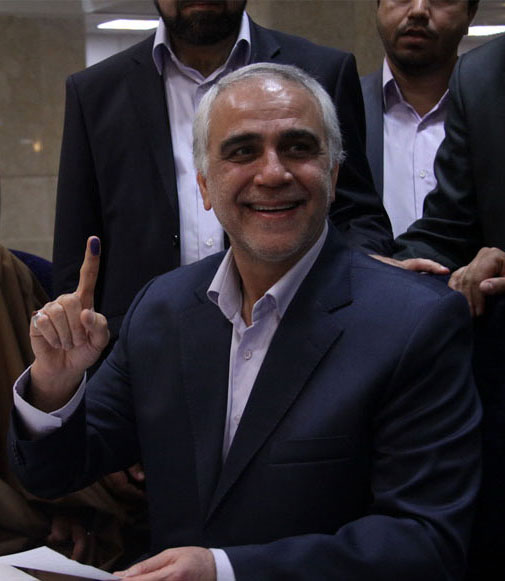
- Parviz Kazemi in the 2013 presidential election

Minister of Welfare and Social Security
- In office 9 November 2005 – 25 September 2006
- President: Mahmoud Ahmadinejad
- Preceded by: Mohammad Hossein Sharifzadegan
- Succeeded by: Abdolreza Mesri

Personal details
- Born: c. 1958 (age 67–68) Tehran, Iran

Parviz Kazemi (Persian: پرویز کاظمی) is an Iranian politician and former Minister of Welfare and Social Security in the first cabinet of Mahmoud Ahmadinejad. Ahmadinejad proposed him to parliament in August 2005 but has resigned after one year. After stepping down from his post in 2006, he started working in banking. Kazemi was found guilty of financial fraud on March 18, 2019. Kazemi admitted that €30 million ($34 million) was deposited into his wife's account, while prosecutors alleged he issued 46 illegal loans totaling $600,000.
