= COVAX-19 =

Vaccine candidate against COVID-19

Vaccine description
- Target: SARS-CoV-2
- Vaccine type: Protein subunit

Clinical data
- Trade names: Spikogen
- Routes of administration: Intramuscular

Legal status
- Legal status: Full and emergency authorisations; Full list of COVAX-19 authorisations

Identifiers
- CAS Number: 2543231-22-5

COVAX-19 (or SpikoGen) is a recombinant protein-based COVID-19 vaccine developed by South Australian-based biotech company Vaxine, in collaboration with CinnaGen, a private company with operations in West Asia. It is under clinical trial in collaboration with the Iranian company CinnaGen.

== Medical uses ==
It requires two doses 21 days apart given by intramuscular injection.

== Pharmacology ==
COVAX-19 is a recombinant protein subunit.

== History ==
Vaxine began work on a COVID-19 vaccine in January 2020. After developing a vaccine adjuvant the company decided to focus on a "recombinant protein-based vaccine". A phase 1 human trial started in June 2020. The phase 1 trial involved 40 participants, 30 of whom received the vaccine. The remaining ten participants received a saline placebo.

Phases 2 and 3 clinical trials of COVAX-19 are being conducted in Iran under a co-operation agreement. Phase 2 clinical trials started in May 2021 and Phase 3 trials commenced in August 2021. In the phase 2 trials, 400 Iranian volunteers were injected with either a placebo or the first dose of the vaccine. If the studies are successful, Cinnagen will produce the vaccine under the name SpikoGen in Iran.

=== Clinical trials ===
Clinical trials of COVAX-19 (SpikoGen)
Phase	Registration number	Start	Number of participants			Age of participants	Location	Ref
Phase	Registration number	Start	Total	Vaccine	Placebo	Age of participants	Location	Ref
I	NCT04453852	30 June 2020	40	30	10	18–65 years	Adelaide, Australia	
II	IRCT20150303021315N23	30 May 2021	400	300	100	18+ years	Tehran, Iran	
II	NCT04944368	30 May 2021	400	300	100	18+ years	Tehran, Iran	
III	IRCT20150303021315N24	7 August 2021	16,876	12,657	4,219	18–50 years	Tehran, Iran	
III	NCT05005559	7 August 2021	16,876	12,657	4,219	18–50 years	Tehran, Iran	

=== Authorisations ===
On 6 October 2021, Iran approved the vaccine for emergency use.

== See also ==
- COVID-19 vaccine clinical research
- COVID-19 pandemic in Australia
- COVID-19 pandemic in Iran
- Pharmaceuticals in Iran
