= Hesarak (Karaj) =

Coordinates: 35°50′37″N 50°55′25″E

Hesarak neighborhood above
Location of Hesarak Bala neighborhood in the northwest of Karaj
Country	iran
State	alborz
City	Karaj
Urban area	District 6 of Karaj city
Area	4 cities of Karaj
Mail area	319
area code	026
Local phone prefix	345
social network	instagram

Hesarak Bala is a neighborhood located in the northwest of Karaj, Iran and in District 6 of Karaj Municipality.

== Geographical and urban location ==
This neighborhood leads from the north to Sarbazan Gomnam Anonymous Boulevard, from the south to Shahid Beheshti Street (Qazvin Old Road), from the east to Qalam Street and from the west to Kharazmi Boulevard. Hesarak Bala is bounded on the west by Karaj (Pishhangi), on the east by Gohardasht neighborhood, on the north by Shahin Villa neighborhood, and on the south by Hesarak Pa'in neighborhood.

== Ecology ==
Hesarak Bala is culturally almost single-culturally defined and has cultural facilities and educational centers. Various schools and university centers, especially the Teacher Training College, have added to the development of the region's culture and social character.

The people of the upper Hesarak are of different ethnicities and have a long history. Although the population of this region is composed of different ethnic groups, based on the antiquity and civilization of the land, a single culture can be seen. It can be said that most of the people of Hesarak are from the north and, of course, other ethnic groups in Iran, such as Yazdi, Kermani, Isfahani, etc., can also be seen.

It can be said that Hesarak Bala area is one of the most suitable areas for living. What is more, this region has a temperate climate and the housing and land conditions are more suitable than other areas of Karaj. Due to the famous Hesarak Bazaar, the food and leeks of this region are the most important factor in choosing this region.

The upper Hesarak area has a genuine, compassionate, emotional and sociable people, so that they appear well in social communication. Considering the change and evolution of social behaviors and manners that can be seen in Karaj city, it can be said that the people of this region have intellectual stability and superfluous masculinity, and of course, the stability of their behavior and social performance is admirable in many fields. Director of the Sociology Department of the History Museum of Karaj.

== Scientific research centers ==
The Razi Vaccine and Serum Research Institute is the oldest institute active in the field of vaccine production in Iran. The institute is located in the Hesarak Bala area of Alborz. It produces more than three and a half billion doses of various biological products annually.

The institute is located on the old Qazvin road, now renamed Shahid Beheshti Street. This route was part of the Silk Road between the cities of Qazvin and Rey. The institute was used during the Qajar period as a treatment center for horses, horsemen, couriers and livestock. After the First World War, due to the Treaty of Turkmenchay, the deprived Qajar state suffered from famine and widespread infectious diseases in people and livestock. It became an animal and a cold in Iran, which was later renamed "Razi Refrigeration Company" by the order of Reza Shah Kabir and then renamed to "Razi Vaccine and Serum Research Institute".

The center's initial activity focused on cattle plague, but later expanded to produce a variety of vaccines and serums for medical and veterinary use. Following World War II, the institute was occupied by Red Army forces for several years, and they built several military-based buildings at the institute.

Kharazmi University is one of the state universities affiliated with the Iranian Ministry of Science, Research and Technology, named after the Iranian scientist Mohammad bin Musa Kharazmi.

The university has been renamed several times and a campus has been added to it. Currently, Kharazmi University specializes in various fields Basic Sciences, Humanities, Educational Sciences and Engineering in various courses from Bachelor.

In 1312, the name of this university was changed from Teachers High School to Higher Education University and in 1353 it was changed to Teacher Training University. The renaming of this university to "Kharazmi University" was approved by the Ministry of Science's Higher Education Development Council in 1981 and 1982, and since February 2012, the university has been officially renamed "Kharazmi University".

== Main streets and boulevards ==
The main streets include Shahid Beheshti, Kharazmi, Ghalam, Anonymous Soldiers, Azadi, Imam Khomeini, Kaveh, Khoshboui, Khorasani, Mohammadi, and Sassanids.

== Index places ==
- kharazmi University
- Razi Vaccine and Serum Research Institute
- Shahid Rajaei Heart Hospital
- Karaj Vocational Technical University
- Kowsar Hospital
- Alborz Mall Commercial Complex
