= Ministry of Labour and Social Affairs (Iran) =

Coordinates: 35°42′3.41″N 51°22′2.71″E

- وزارت کار و امور اجتماعی

Agency overview
- Formed: 1 November 1950
- Dissolved: 3 August 2011
- Superseding agency: Ministry of Cooperatives, Labour and Social Welfare
- Jurisdiction: Islamic Republic of Iran
- Headquarters: Tehran, Iran

Ministry of Labour and Social Affairs of Iran (Persian: وزارت کار و امور اجتماعی, Vâzart-e Kaz-e vâ Amvâz-e Ajtema'i), was the main organ of Iranian Government in charge of the regulation and implementation of policies applicable to labour and social affairs.

== History ==
After the Second World War and its social and economic effects, disagreements and strikes increased in different parts of the country, these pressures made the government of prime minister Ahmad Qavam to establish an independent office as "General Office of Labour" under the "Ministry of Profession and Art" in 1944. It couldn't solve the existed problems, so they came to a conclusion that in order to overcome the problems, they should pass a law for labour regulations. The first Labour law was approved by cabinet (but not the parliament) on May 18, 1946, in a special situation where the labour strikes was going to take a political aspect. The inability of "General Office of Labour" to overcome the difficulties and other reasons, resulted in the formation of the "Ministry of Labour and Advertisement" on August 4, 1946. Later it became "Ministry of Labor and Social Affairs", and after the Iranian 1979 revolution, many related organizations came under it. Ministry was dissolved on 3 August 2011.

== List of ministers ==
Pahlavi era: Mozaffar Firuz was the first labour minister of Iran in Qavam cabinet. Amongst other ministers of the same post during the Pahlavi era were Ahmad Aramesh in the cabinet led by Ahmad Qavam, Ibrahim Alemi in the cabinet of Mohammad Mosaddegh and Manuchehr Azmun in Amir-Abbas Hoveida cabinet.

After the Iranian revolution the following served in the post:

- Dariush Forouhar
- Ali Espahbodi
- Mohammad Reza Nematzadeh
- Mohammad Mir-Mohammad Sadeghi
- Ahmad Tavakkoli
- Abolghasem Sarhadizadeh
- Hossein Kamali
- Safdar Hosseini
- Nasser Khaleghi
- Mohammad Jahromi
- Reza Sheykholeslam

== Deputies ==
The ministry consists of six deputies as:

- Deputy for Coordination & International affairs
- Deputy for Labour Relations
- Deputy for Planning & Employment Policies
- Deputy for Social & Cultural affairs
- Deputy for Legal & Parliamentary affairs
- Deputy for Patronage

== See also ==
- Iranian labor law
- Iranian Labour News Agency
- Cabinet of Iran
- Government of Iran
  - Ministry of Welfare and Social Security (Iran)
