= Split payment =

Financial splitting of transactions

Split payment (also split payment transaction, or split tender) is the financial term for the act of splitting (dividing) a single full payment into two or more simultaneous transactions made by different payment methods. For example, a payment of $100 due to a retail shop might be a split payment when the customer pays $50 in cash and $50 by credit card. A split payment might also enable two or more individuals to each contribute part of a total. An example is two people each paying $50 on their respective credit cards toward a $100 total bill at a restaurant. Split payment is not the same as an installment purchase (a.k.a. hire purchase), where payments are done periodically with the same payment method.

== History ==
With the era of global trade, the financial possibilities grew and with them the challenges of collecting payments. The global markets made open and the consumer gained an increased buying power. In local and international transaction merchants are required to provide consumers with multiple payment options - this is not only a service required by consumers, it is a must-have for merchants in order to convert their products/services into cash. Statistically, the more payment options a merchant is able to offer, the likelihood of reaching more consumers increases. The various payment methods available world-wide is overwhelming, nevertheless the payment methods available in a specific market are influenced by the local laws, legislations, culture and level of development. For merchants this creates a challenge of adapting their systems to accept a wide range of payment methods in order to enter a market with their offerings.

== Split payment vs. coupon ==
Key differences between split payment and coupons or vouchers:

- Coupons or vouchers are used to reduce the total amount owed, which is then paid in a single transaction through one payment method.
- Split payment divides the total amount owed into multiple transactions using different payment methods.
- Coupons are applied earlier in the checkout process, before payment is made. They discount the total due at the shopping cart stage.
- Split payment happens later, during the actual checkout process. It splits the payment across methods in one of the final steps.

So in essence, coupons lower the amount due upfront, which is then paid fully in one payment. Split payment takes the full amount due and divides it into separate partial payments made through multiple methods or transactions. The key distinction is that coupons discount the total before payment, while split payment segments the payment itself.

== Challenges ==
=== Business challenges ===
The challenges for the business are all across the organization. It is mainly the accumulation and the reference of two separate transactions into a single order. What is in real-life trivial (the two payments come from the same hand) is for business processes a challenge, and it is a bigger challenge when these transactions made on the Internet. The business challenges shy both small and large merchants from offering split payment.

=== Technical challenges ===
The IT systems dealing with financial transactions process those transaction as atomic unit. Financial systems complete one transaction from beginning to end; any subsequent transaction is considered a totally new case. Combining the two transactions has impacts on costs, anti-fraud, reporting obligations (law & regulations) and might end up with only partial information stored in the merchant system.

==== Example: online implementation for split payment ====
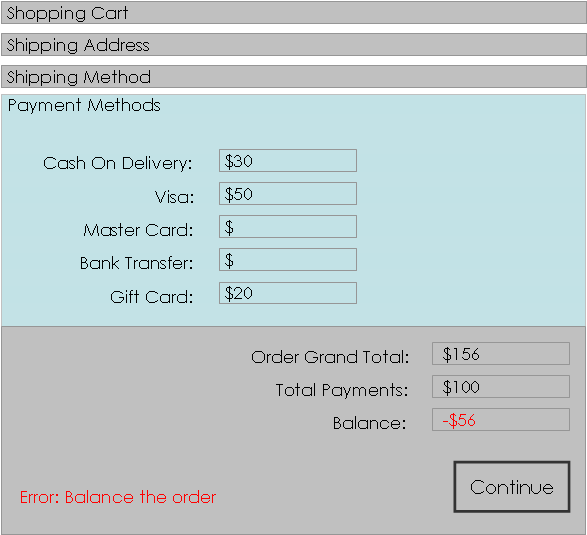
An example of split payment implementation during checkout

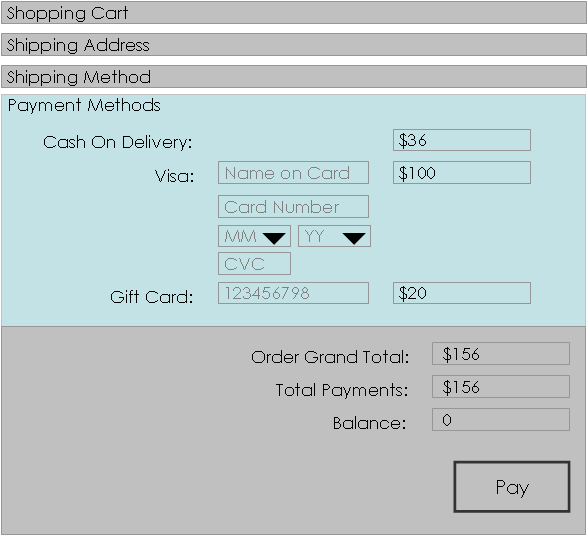
An example of split payment transaction page for online business

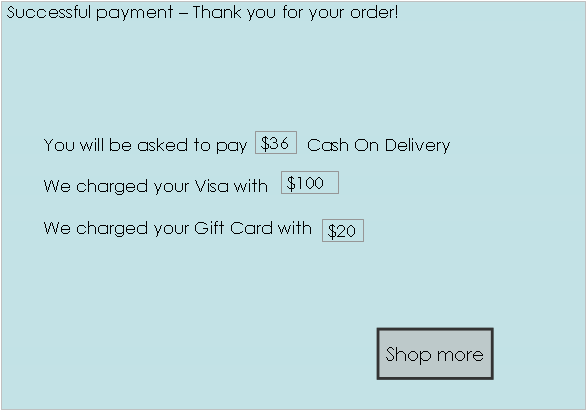
An example of split payment confirmation page for online business

== Point of sale ==
Many point of sale (POS) systems implement split payment.
