= National Credit Network =

Iranian government food rationing program

Electronic coupon program
- Type of project: Mobile payment, Shopping app
- Ministry: Ministry of Cooperatives, Labour, and Social Welfare
- Website: shoma.sfara.ir

The National Credit Network is an Iranian food, staple and other goods coupon ration program established by the government of Iran in June 2023.

Grocery stores, wholesalers, and supermarkets can register to sell eligible products, while purchases made in a few national chain stores (such as Refah) may be covered by coupons.

The program was a failure. It failed in providing better priced nutrition to poor people population shopping.

In February 2024 Iran celebrated its 45th anniversary of the Islamic revolution since its establishment with 220,000 toman to 330,000 ($5) toman electronic 11 essential food item coupons for a week which lengthy queues in grocery markets.

== Phases ==
Payments for subsidized goods are made through each eligible family's monthly subsidy payment. There is an app available for families of social class tiers 1 - tier 3 (families in tiers 4 to 9 are excluded). Families are paid 300,000 toman ($6) and can use their next month's subsidy pay too as credit, they get 80,000 extra monthly if they buy select products.

Couponed product	Standard monthly consumption
Dairy (Milk low fat bottle) 1 liter	3 kg
Dairy (Chesse ultrafat) 400 grams	0.40 kg
Egg	1 kg
Chicken meat	2 kg
Cooking oil 810 grams	0.81 kg
Macaroni /pasta 700 grams	0.7 kg
Rice	2 kg
Dairy (Yogurt high fat) 2.5 kg	2.5 kg
Sugar / sugarcube	0.5 kg
Cow meat	1 kg
Beans. Vegetables and Legumes	1.20 kg
(Future coupons could include baby diapers, cleaning and washing products)	

Phase 2 might include another 25 million of the population.

The app covers members of Islamic republic military, Behzisti (Disability support organization ) Imam Khomeini Relief Foundation.
