= Shopa Docket =

Australian coupon company

- Website type: Privately held company
- Founded: 1986
- Dissolved: 14 September 2023
- Country of origin: Australia
- Founder: Simon McCord
- General manager: Preeti Kennedy
- Key people: Simon McCord (CEO & MD); Jodi McCord (Director)
- Industry: Coupon, Advertising
- Divisions: SM Shop A Docket India Private Limited
- Website: www.shopadocket.com.au/

Shopa Docket was an Australian coupon company, founded in 1986, based in Brisbane, Queensland, Australia. It was a provider of coupons that appear on the back of receipts in supermarkets and variety stores and outlets including Woolworths, Target, Kmart, Big W, Chemist Warehouse, Harris Farm and IGA.

Shopa Docket helped companies to advertise, promote and market their brand through their coupons. Shopa Docket was part of the Shopa Group. It provided online offers, deals, vouchers, and coupon codes from several local and national brands. It was the sole provider of printed docket advertising in Australia, reportedly by the Brisbane Times.

In September 2023, Shop A Docket, entered administration.

== History ==
Shopa Docket was established in 1986 by Simon McCord, with a single retailer called Pick N Pay Hypermarket in Brisbane, Queensland offering free cash register rolls in exchange for advertising space on the back of receipts.

In 1989, Franklins, Bi-Lo and many other independent and regional supermarkets came on board.

In April 1992, The New South Wales Police tied up with Shopa Docket to spread the anti-criminal message as part of the Crimestoppers Program throughout New South Wales, Queensland and Victoria.

In 2001, Shopa Docket rolled out full-colour dockets across Australia for the first time. In 2013, the Metropolitan Fire Brigade (Melbourne) teamed up with Shopa Docket to spread awareness about fire safety among the Vietnamese people.

In 2019 Shopa Docket launched Shopa Save, a prepaid deals and in-store and online cashback rewards program. In 2020, Shopa Digital was launched, offering clients social media, search engine optimisation and pay-per-click advertising services. All three brands became part of the Shopa Group.

At the peak, Shopa Docket had over 720,000 active registered user members and over 100,000 participating businesses. Shopa Docket distributed more than 1 billion ads a year in Australia.

As of September 2023, A.C.N. 145 906 403 Pty Ltd, formerly known as Shop A Docket Pty Limited, entered into liquidation. This occurred amid financial challenges, including a slowdown in consumer spending and increased operational costs.

== Others ==
In February 2003, The company partnered with Clean Up Australia and supported the Clean Up Australia Day initiative by printing and distributing more than 60 million coupons on the back of shopping receipts. Shopa Docket where been supporting Clean Up Australia for more than twenty years.

In 2012, Shopa Docket partnered with Hannah's Chance Foundation to hold the first Shopa Docket NSW Sarcoma Surf Tag Team event, raising over $7,000 for the foundation.

Shopa Docket has sponsored Hawthorn Football Club, Sydney Kings, Parramatta Eels and Manly Warringah Sea Eagles.
