= Cinnagen =

Iran-based Biopharmaceutical company

CinnaGen is an Iran based biopharmaceutical company that was founded in 1994 by Hamid Mobtaker. As of 2016, it manufactured biosimilar drugs, laboratory diagnostic reagents for in vitro use, and recombinant proteins, and exported to other countries in the Middle East and to countries in the Commonwealth of Independent States.

Cinnagen logo

One of CinnaGen's products is Cinnovex, a biosimilar of interferon-beta used for treatment of multiple sclerosis; the recombinant DNA used to make the product was created by scientists at Fraunhofer Institute in Germany which also conducted the initial testing; Fraunhofer licensed it to CinnaGen which completed development and obtained approval from Iranian Food and Drug Administration in 2007. In a new cooperation agreement, Phases 2 and 3 clinical trials of the Vaxine’s monovalent recombinant COVID-19 vaccine will be initiated in Iran in the coming weeks. If these studies are successful, this Australian vaccine will be produced under the brand name SpikoGen ® by CinnaGen Company and will be rolled out in Iran

== See also ==
- COVAX-19 (SpikoGen)
- Pharmaceuticals in Iran
- Science and technology in Iran
