= Iran Technical and Vocational Training Organization =

Technical and Vocational Training Government Agency of Iran

Iran Technical and Vocational Training Organization; (Iran TVTO)
- سازمان آموزش فنی و حرفه‌ای کشور

Agency overview
- Formed: 1980; 46 years ago
- Type: Government agency
- Jurisdiction: Ministry of Cooperatives, Labour, and Social Welfare
- Headquarters: 818/13445, Tehran, Iran, Azadi St., Corner of Khosh St.; 35.7002385°N 51.3722132°E
- Motto: TVTO; I.R.T.V.T.O
- Agency executive: Fatemeh Mansouri (acting)
- Parent department: Ministry of Cooperatives, Labour, and Social Welfare
- Website: irantvto.ir

The Iran Technical and Vocational Training Organization (or I.R.T.V.T.O) is one of the organizations affiliated to the Ministry of Cooperatives, Labour, and Social Welfare, which was formed from the merger of three educational institutions in 1980 in order to provide technical and vocational education. In addition to the central headquarters, this organization has 31 general administrations in provinces of Iran, an instructor training center, 552 Learning Center and over 11700 free technical and vocational schools. In order to achieve the latest science and technology news and to comply with international standards, the organization always tried to expand international relations, including with the International Labour Organization and the International Organization for Vocational Training in other countries. In this regard, the organization, regardless of the interpretation of the overall organizational structure, carries out its activities only in the field of education, with the support of the research field.

== History ==
The roots of the formation of the Technical and Vocational Training Organization of Iran go back to the approval of the internship and skills increase regulations on January 17, 1961 by the Supreme Labor Council of Iran.

After Iranian Revolution, the organization was formed in 1980 by merge of three educational units include the General Directorate of Vocational Education of the Ministry of Labor and Social Affairs, the Internship Fund and the Internship Center, called the Technical Education and Manpower Organization. In 1981, it was renamed to current name Technical and Vocational Training Organization of the country.

== Structure ==
The Iran Technical and Vocational Training Organization is one of affiliated government agency of the Ministry of Cooperatives, Labour, and Social Welfare and it consists of the following three main cores:

- Deputy of Education
- Deputy of Research and Planning
- Deputy of Administrative and Support

== Main mission ==
The main mission of the organization is skills training, research, production of educational standards and labor force evaluation. The Technical and Vocational Education Organization of the country, with the help of 552 permanent training centers and with the support of 11,700 private schools and 21,000 instructors, annually provides educational services to approximately 1.5 million people in both the public and private section.

== Target groups ==
The target groups of the organization for skills training are: job seekers, employees (enterprises - unions and guilds), students and university graduates, conscripts, residents of deprived and country borders areas, vulnerable groups (Including female-headed households and working children), housewives, people with disabilities, villagers, nomads, prisoners and their families, recovering addicts, the socially disadvantaged, foreign nationals and refugees, and educators from other countries.

== Instructor training center ==
The Instructor Training and Research Center of the organization is one of the unique educational centers in the Middle East which through its 16 specialized departments, acts as a research and development unit of the organization and prepare background to transfer knowledge and application of new technologies.

== International arena ==
To date, the organization has held 18 national skill competitions with the presence of more than 10,000 competitors from all over Iran. These acts led to prepare the national skills team and finally 9 participation in international competitions.

Also cooperation with United Nations High Commissioner for Refugees and Japan International Cooperation Agency, Korea International Cooperation Agency, UNESCO, United Nations Industrial Development Organization, UNEVOC and BIBB is another international initiative.

== See also ==
- The National Festival of Entrepreneurs in Iran
- Social Security Organization
- Ministry of Welfare and Social Security
- National Organization for Civil Registration of Iran
- Housing Foundation of Islamic Revolution
