= Razi Cov Pars =

Vaccine candidate against COVID-19

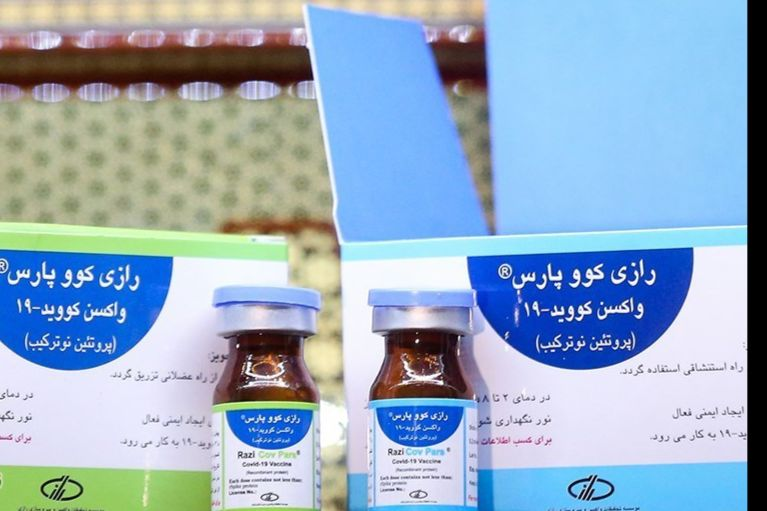

Vaccine description
- Target: SARS-CoV-2
- Vaccine type: Protein subunit

Clinical data
- Routes of administration: Intramuscular, Intranasal

Legal status
- Legal status: Full list of Razi Cov Pars authorizations

Identifiers
- CAS Number: 2696315-86-1

Razi Cov Pars (Persian: رازی کوو پارس) is a COVID-19 vaccine developed by the Iranian Razi Vaccine and Serum Research Institute Razi Cov Pars is a covid-19 vaccine based on recombinant protein, which is being produced by Razi Vaccine and Serum Research Institute, Iran. This vaccine is the first injectable-intranasal recombinant protein corona vaccine. It's the second Iranian COVID-19 vaccine reaching human trials and is currently in phase III of clinical research during which it's compared to the Sinopharm BIBP vaccine.

== Medical uses ==
It requires three doses given day 0 (intramuscular), day 21 (intramuscular) and day 51 (intranasal spray).

== Pharmacology ==
Razi Cov Pars is a recombinant protein subunit vaccine containing the SARS-CoV-2 spike protein.

== Manufacturing ==
It's planned to produce one million doses of the vaccine each month as of September 2021.

As of 25 November 2021, 5 millions doses have been delivered to the Iranian Ministry of Health.

== History ==
=== Clinical trials ===
Clinical trials of Razi Cov Pars
Phase	Registration number	Start	Number of participants			Age of participants	Ref
Phase	Registration number	Start	Total	Vaccine	Placebo	Age of participants	Ref
I	IRCT20201214049709N1	21 January 2021	133	30 (5 μg/200 μL) 30 (10 μg/200 μL) 30 (20 μg/200 μL)	30 (placebo) 13 (sentinel)	18-50 years	
II	IRCT20201214049709N2	13 April 2021	500			18-70 years	
III	IRCT20201214049709N3	29 August 2021	41,128	20,564	0 (placebo) 20,564 (Sinopharm BIBP vaccine)	18+ years	

== See also ==
- Pharmaceuticals in Iran
- COVID-19 pandemic in Iran
- COVID-19 vaccine clinical research
