= Razi Vaccine and Serum Research Institute =

Iranian research institute

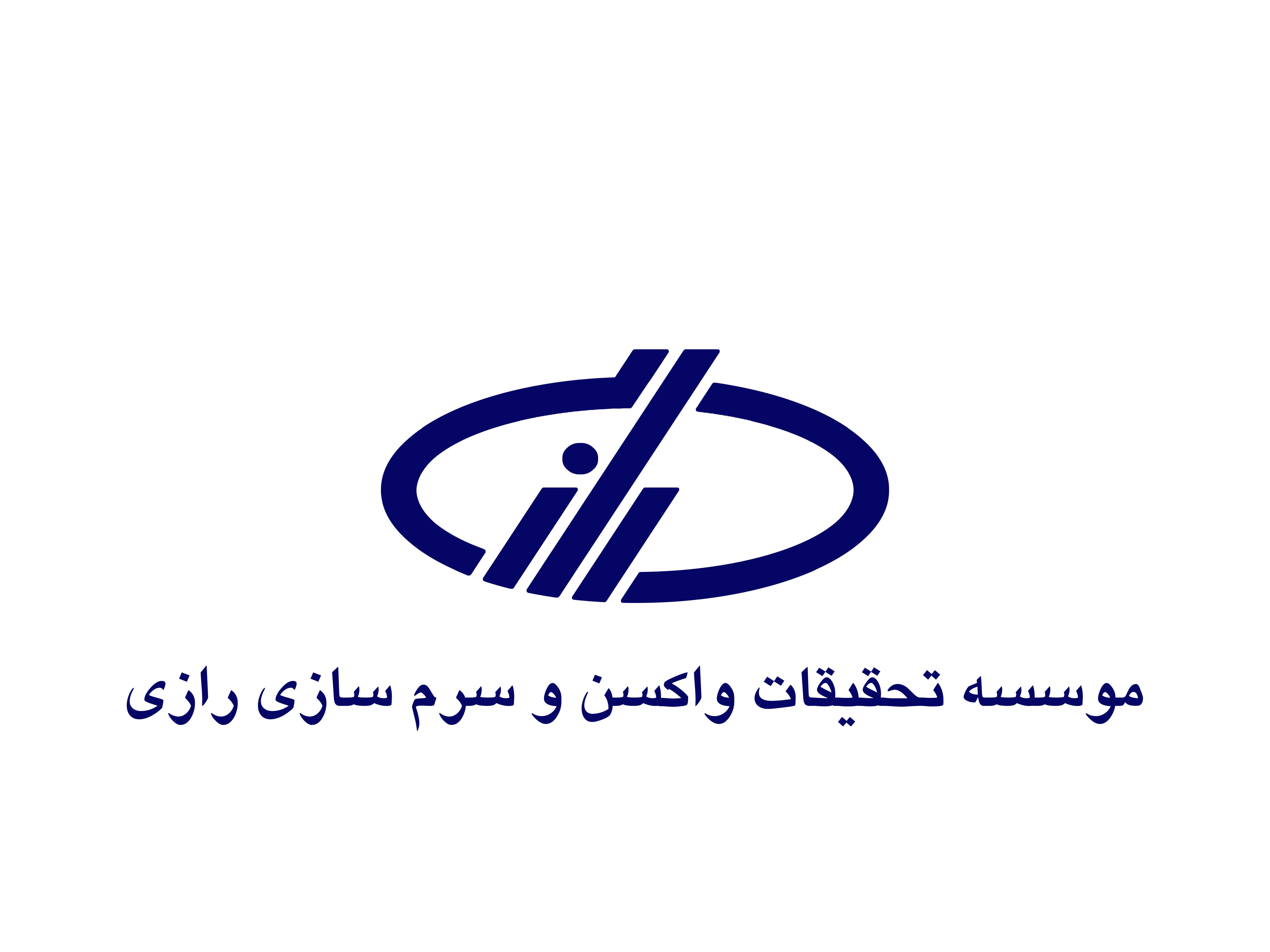
- Type: Research institute
- Founded: 5 January 1925; 101 years ago
- Founder: Mustafa-Qoli Bayat
- Headquarters: Karaj, Iran
- Production output: Human and Animal Medicines
- Number of employees: circa 2000
- Website: www.rvsri.ac.ir

The Razi Vaccine and Serum Research Institute (romanized: Mo'asseseh-ye Tahqiqât-e Vâksan va Seromsâzi-e Râzi) is an Iranian pharmaceutical and biological institute. It is located in the Hessarak district in Karaj, Iran. The institute was built as a national center with the purpose of countering epidemics in domestic animals during Reza Shah era. Further departments were installed, including those dedicated to human medicines. In modern years, the institute has focused primarily on nanomedicine and biotechnology.

The institute is known for its anti-venom serums derived from snake and scorpion venom. It hosts some reference pharmaceutical laboratories with regional or state scopes.

== Branches ==
The institute has established regional branches in:

- Arak
- Ahvaz
- Kerman
- Mashhad
- Marand
- Shiraz

== History ==
A technician at the institute inoculating eggs to producing rabies vaccine in 1967.

=== Production timeline ===
- 1924: Institution of the institute.
- 1932: Louis Delpy, a French veterinarian, drove the institute to overcome an epidemic of cattle plague in the region.
- 1933: Anthrax
- 1935: Sheep Pox
- 1936: Livestock Gangrene
- 1937: Cattle Pasteurellosis
- 1941: Serums and vaccines for diphtheria and tetanus
- 1970: Polio
- 1987: Rubella and Measles
- 1998: Aleppo Boil
- 1992: Foundation of the biotechnology department.
- 1997: Enhancement of the biotechnology department.
- 2010: The institute produced 1.7 billion doses of 57 types of vaccines, serums, and antigens per year.
- 2012: Production of transgenic animals, creating recombinant vaccines through genetic engineering, developing antigens and diagnostic kits for medical and veterinary labs.
- 2021: Razi Cov Pars: a COVID-19 vaccine
- 2024: Production of a recombinant seed strain of highly pathogenic influenza virus based on Reverse Genetics technology

=== History points ===
- The facility was used as a Soviet military base during World War II
- NATO forces used some of the institute's anti-venom products during the Afghanistan war, since Afghan native snakes had not been researched in the USA or Europe.

== See also ==
- Pharmaceuticals in Iran
