= Kharazmi University =

One of the famous universities of Iran

- دانشگاه خوارزمی
- Former names: Tehran University of Teacher Training (TOT)
- Motto in English: Better Education for a Better World
- Type: Public
- Established: 1919; 107 years ago
- Chancellor: Ali Hasanbeigi
- Academic staff: 541
- Students: ~14,500
- Undergraduates: 7850
- Postgraduates: 3400
- Location: Tehran and Karaj, Iran, Middle East
- Campus: Karaj and Tehran
- Website: khu.ac.ir

Kharazmi University (Abbreviation: KHU) (Persian: دانشگاه خوارزمی, Daneshgah-e Xuarazmi), formerly Tehran University of Teacher Training (Persian: دانشگاه تربیت معلم سابق), is a public research university in Iran, KHU named after Khwarizmi (c. 780–850), Persian mathematician, astronomer and geographer, offering a wide range of undergraduate and postgraduate programs in a variety of disciplines. KHU is considered the oldest institution of higher education in Iran. It was established in 1919 as the Central Teachers' Institute and gained university status as Tarbiat Moallem University of Tehran in 1974. It changed its name to Kharazmi University on January 31, 2012.

In 2015, the University of Economic Sciences (founded in 1936) was merged into Kharazmi University as its faculty of management, faculty of financial sciences, and faculty of economics. The university has two main campuses, the main campus including administration offices located in Tehran, and another is in the Hesarak district of Karaj.

Currently, KHU accepts students in various fields of basic sciences, humanities, literature education, and engineering at different levels from bachelor's to doctorate, even post-doctorate and higher levels. Kharazmi is one of the state universities affiliated to the Ministry of Science, Research and Technology of Iran, which is located in Tehran and has a campus in the city of Karaj, the capital of Alborz province. This university has changed its name several times. The president is Ali Hasan Beigi, and the founder of the university is Isa Seddigh. This old university was registered in the list of national monuments of Iran by UNESCO on the first day of Mehr month 1382 AH under number 10410. The architect of the KHU university is the Russian engineer Markov.

KHI School of Engineering and business school won international rankings of 601-800th in 2019, 2020, and 2021, in 351-400. In 2023, 8th in Iran and 400-451 in the world. It ranked 6th and 10th in industrial income among Iranian universities, especially the Business school in 2020 and Civil Engineering, Economy Education and MBA.

== History ==
The first teacher training institution for primary schools in Iran was established as Darol-Mo'allemin Markazi (Central College of Teachers) in the building of the Culture Ministry in Takht-e-Zomorod area of Tehran in 1919.

== Administration ==
The chancellor of the university was Azizollah Habibi as of 2020.

== Research Institutes ==
- Institute for Educational Research: the institute was established in 1969.
- Research Center of National Excellence for Stress Psychology: The center was established in 2005 in accordance with the plan developed by the department of psychology at the university and approved by the relevant Research Centers of National Excellence across the country.
- Comparative Philosophy and Law Research Center: the center was established in 2007 with Human rights, Comparative philosophy and Comparative Law departments.

== See also ==
- List of Islamic educational institutions
- Higher education in Iran
- List of Iranian Universities
- Dar ul-Funun (Persia)
