= Ministry of Cooperatives, Labour, and Social Welfare =

Government ministry of Iran

- وزارت تعاون، کار و رفاه اجتماعی; Vezârat-e Ta'âvon, Kâr va Refâh-e Ejtemâ'i
- Flag of the Ministry of Cooperatives, Labour, and Social Welfare

Agency overview
- Formed: 3 August 2011
- Preceding agencies: Ministry of Cooperatives; Ministry of Labour and Social Affairs; Ministry of Welfare and Social Security
- Jurisdiction: Government of the Islamic Republic of Iran
- Employees: 46,294 (2019)
- Agency executive: Ahmad Meydari

The Ministry of Cooperatives, Labour, and Social Welfare (Persian: وزارت تعاون، کار و رفاه اجتماعی, romanized: Wezārate Taāwon, Kār wa Refāhe Ejtemāi) is an Iranian government body responsible for the oversight of Cooperative business, regulation and implementation of policies applicable to labour and social affairs. It also oversees the Social Security (social welfare) of Iran. The social security (social welfare) program was formed on 3 August 2011 to ensure the well-being of the people in Iran.

This Ministry was formed in 2011 by merging the Ministry of Cooperatives, Ministry of Labour and Ministry of Social Welfare.

In the country, the activities of Minister of C.L.S. are focused on the regulation of labour laws, well-being of the workforce and addressing the brain drain. The Ministry of C.L.S. manages the entrepreneurship in Iran. It manages the annual entrepreneurs festival. In the festival, prizes are donated to the winners of The National Festival of Entrepreneurs in Iran.

== Program ==
In July 2023 the ministry began an work departmental relations in Qatar.

It offers credit/loans for working at home jobs.

It administrates Iranian skilled labor recruitment out of the country in other states such as Qatar, Oman, Armenia, and Iraq.

It runs a database system of the unemployed people identities, including sorting by sex, skill or of specific location.

== Job finding search engine ==
In July 2023 it created a job search website for job seekers and employers it has classified ad, and a resume making, and sending system.

== Notable people ==
Former and first Minister of Ministry of Cooperatives, Labor and Social Welfare (Ministry of C.L.S.) Reza Sheykoleslam was a governor of Hormozgan Province.

The last minister of Ministry of Cooperatives before the merger with the Ministry of Labor and Ministry of Social Welfare Mohammad Abbasi was an athlete before he became the minister. He won over 4 gold, 5 silver, and 3 bronze medals during his sports career.

Former Vice Minister of Ministry of Cooperatives Bahman Salehi is now the minister of the renewable energy corporation SUNIR.

Former General Director of Planning of Ministry of Cooperatives Alireza Nasiri is the founder of online education programs in Iran and is also manages the forestation sector of Iran.

Former Minister of Ministry of Cooperatives, Labor and Social Welfare Asadollah Abbasi is now a parliamentary representative for Rudsar.

== See also ==
- Ministry of Welfare and Social Security (Iran)
- Cabinet of Iran
- Government of Iran
- Iranian labor law
- Iranian Labour News Agency
- The National Festival of Entrepreneurs in Iran
- National Credit Network
