= Gholamreza Shariati =

Iranian politician

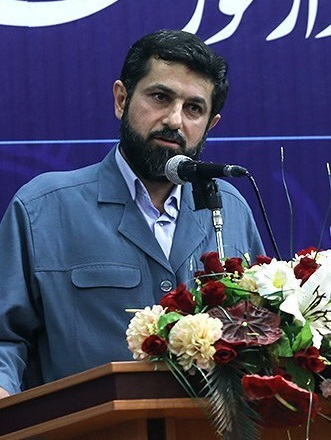
Gholamreza Shariati

Gholam Reza Shariati (Persian: غلامرضا شریعتی, born 1972 in Behbahan) is an Iranian reformist politician, who is the former head of Institute of Standards and Industrial Research of Iran. He was the former governor of Khuzestan Province from 2016 to 2021. Shariati was born in Behbahan.

He is the lecturer at Ahvaz Jundishapur University of Medical Sciences.
