= Disability in Iran =

According to 2015 data, more than 1.87 million Iranians with disabilities, or about 4.2% of the total population, were registered with the government. Although the law requires the collection of data on the number of individuals with disabilities, as well as on the types of disabilities; however, following a low 2011 national census statistic — which purported a mere 1.35% of the population as having disabilities — the Iran Statistics Center removed all questions relating to disability from the 2016 census. In 2014, the director of the State Welfare Organization of Iran's "Disabled Persons Empowerment Office", Keivan Davatgaran, stated that approximately 11% of the population was disabled.

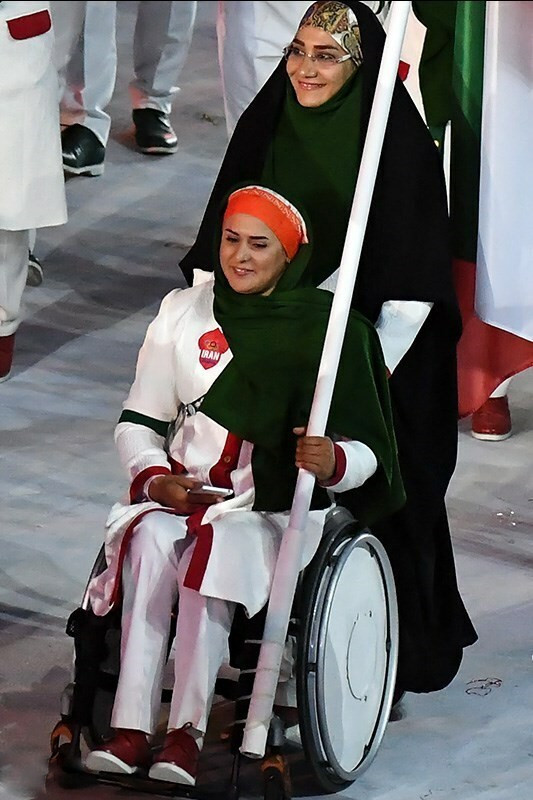
Zahra Nemati, Iranian archer, bearing the flag for the Iranian team during the 2016 Summer Olympics opening ceremony.

== Laws ==
Paragraph 9 Principle 3 of the legal code of the Islamic Republic of Iran emphasizes the removal of unfair discrimination and the creation of equitable facilities for all people in material and spiritual contexts. Laws supporting the rights of disabled people have obliged the government to provide the necessary grounds for securing the rights of disabled people and to provide them with necessary support.

In 2004, the Islamic Consultative Assembly passed legislation under the title of the Comprehensive Law for the Protection of the Disabled and in 16 legal articles; 4 years later, in 2008, the Iranian Parliament approved the Convention on the Rights of Persons with Disabilities, so that Iran joined this international convention. During the administration of Hassan Rouhani, a bill supporting the rights of disabled people was introduced; this bill, under the title Law on the Protection of the Rights of the Disabled, was approved by parliament in March 2018, and its implementation was announced by the president in May 2018. Despite this, there are many problems in the route of implementation of these laws that have caused many of them to be unenforceable.

According to the government of Iran, 25% of disabled individuals who had registered with the State Welfare Organization received disability pensions in 2016.

== Military service exemptions ==
In Iran, according to the comprehension protection act for disabled people, disabled individuals who fall under the textual conditions of this law are medically exempt from military service. There are reports known to the media and citizens regarding the prevalence of discrimination in employment towards people with medical exemptions in public and private offices. Since there is a lot of spiritual, psychological, and economic pressure on families who have a disabled child, in the past there was also an exemption from military service for the other, healthy child of a family with a disabled child. However, presently, according to Article 6 of the Comprehensive Law for the Protection of the Disabled, only families who have two disabled children can have their non-disabled child exempt from military service. Individuals who, according to the text of these laws, have parents with disabilities are exempt from military service.

== Urban problems ==
In most cities in Iran, disabled individuals face various issues. These problems include narrow sidewalks built using inappropriate construction materials, slope gradient, and slippage; the lack of appropriate ramps; the presence of barriers between the sidewalk and the roadway, as well as the absence of a bridge; the improperness of the bridge, as well as the lack of pedestrian crossings and connections between the curb, the sidewalk, and the ditch; and the absence of tactile paving for the blind.

In February 2021, the newspaper Hamshahri reported that along with the increase in the price of rehabilitation equipment for disabled people, theft of equipment required by disabled people has also increased; additionally, many disabled individuals do not have the ability to buy these equipments.

== The Iranian Association for the Blind ==
The Iranian Association for the Blind is a charitable institute in Iran established in December 1993. According to statements made through the website of this association, familiarity of society with the natural rights of citizens with visual impairments and efforts to promote their rights are considered to be some of the most important goals of this association.
