= Coupon =

Document, paper or electronic, to provide a discount on goods or services

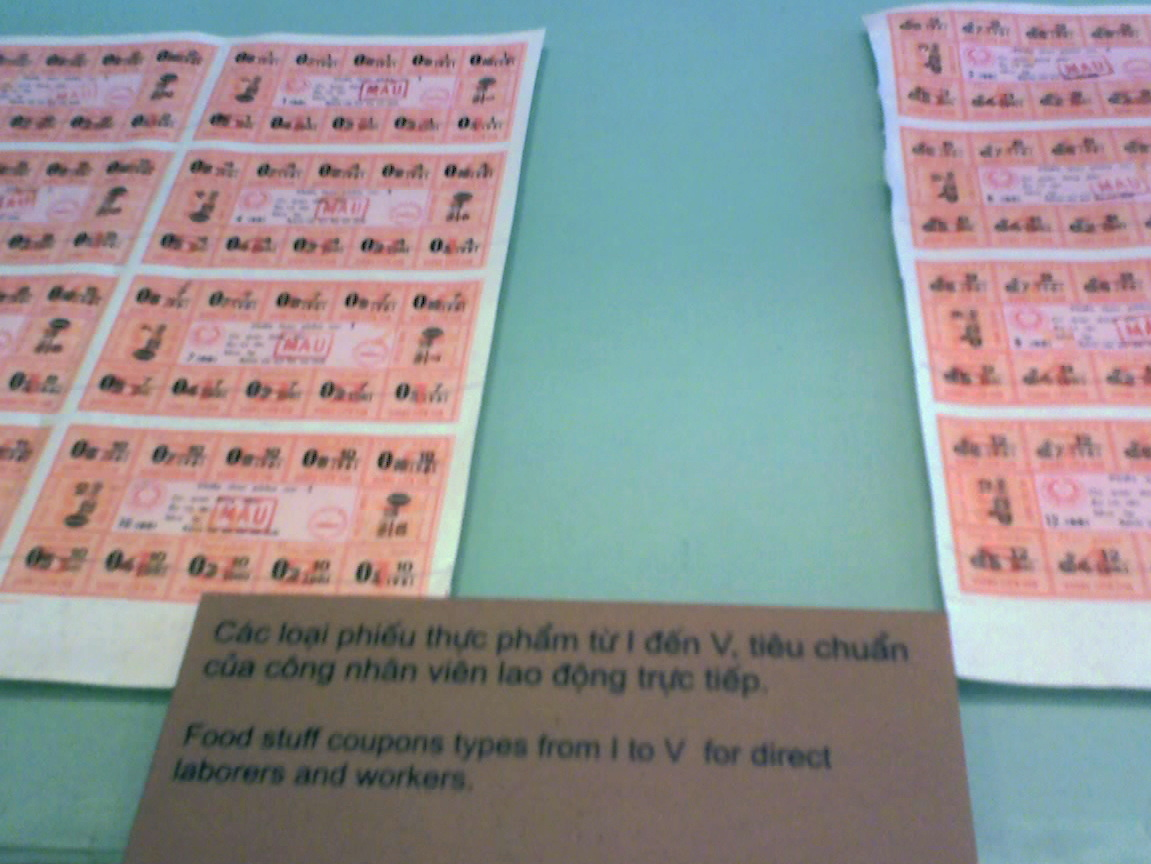
Food stuff ration coupons types I–V for direct laborers and workers in Vietnam, 1976–1986

In marketing, a coupon is a ticket or document that can be redeemed for a financial discount or rebate when purchasing a product.

Customarily, coupons are issued by manufacturers of consumer packaged goods or by retailers, to be used in retail stores as a part of sales promotions. They are often widely distributed through mail, coupon envelopes, magazines, newspapers, the Internet (social media, email newsletter), directly from the retailer, and mobile devices such as cell phones.

The New York Times reported "more than 900 manufacturers' coupons were distributed" per household, and that "the United States Department of Agriculture estimates that four families in five use coupons. "Only about 4 percent" of coupons received were redeemed. Coupons can be targeted selectively to regional markets in which price competition is great.

Most coupons have an expiration date, although American military commissaries overseas honor manufacturers' coupons for up to six months past the expiration date.

== Pronunciation ==
The word is of French origin, pronounced [kupɔ̃]. In Britain, the United States, and Canada it is pronounced /ˈkuːpɒn/ KOO-pon. A common alternate American pronunciation is /ˈkjuːpɒn/ KEW-pon.

== History ==
=== Antiquity ===
During the great famine of 18 AH (638 CE), Umar, the second ruler of the Islamic Caliphate, introduced several reforms such as the introduction of food rationing using coupons, which were given to those in need and could be exchanged for wheat and flour.

=== 1900s ===
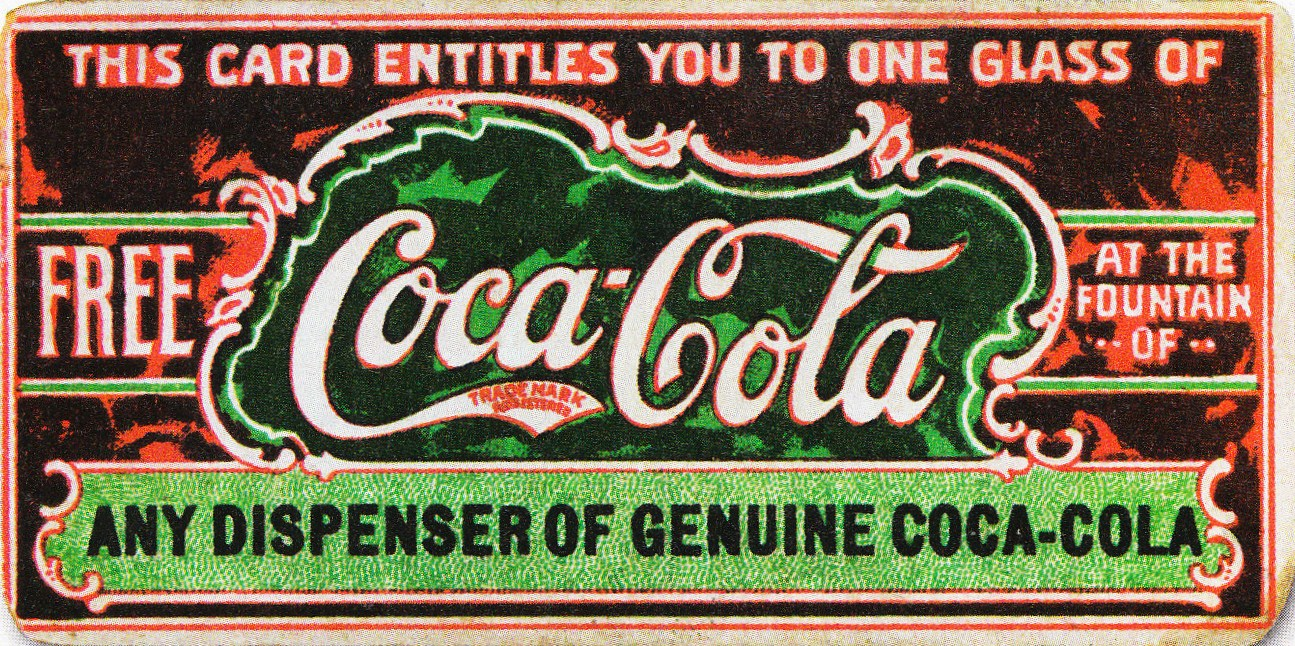
Believed to be the first coupon ever, this ticket for a free glass of Coca-Cola was first distributed in 1888 to help promote the drink. By 1913, the company had redeemed 8.5 million tickets.

Coca-Cola's 1888-issued "free glass of" is the earliest documented coupon. Coupons were mailed to potential customers and placed in magazines. It is estimated that between 1894 and 1913 one in nine Americans had received a free Coca-Cola, for a total of 8,500,000 free drinks. By 1895, Coke was served in every state in the United States.

In 1929, Betty Crocker began a loyalty points program and began issuing coupons that could be used to redeem for premiums like free flatware. In 1937, the coupons were printed on the outside of packages. The loyalty program ended in 2006, one of the longest loyalty programs.

In Australia consumers first came in contact with couponing when a company called Shopa Docket promoted offers and discounts on the back of shopping receipts in 1986.

== Types and uses ==
Coupons offer different types of values, such as discounts, free shipping, buy-one get-one, trade-in for redemption, first-time customer coupons, free trial offer, launch offers, festival offers, and free giveaways. Similarly, there are varied uses of coupons which include: to incentivize a purchase, reduce a price, provide a free sample, or to aid marketers in understanding the demographics of their customer.

=== Function ===
Coupons can be used to research the price sensitivity of different groups of buyers (by sending out coupons with different dollar values to different groups). Time, location and sizes (e.g. five pound vs. 20 pound bag) affect prices; coupons are part of the marketing mix. So is knowing about the customer.

=== Grocery coupons ===
Grocery coupons come in two major types:

- store coupons: issued by the store itself. Some stores will also accept store coupons issued by competitors.
- Coupons issued by the manufacturer of a product may be used at any coupon-accepting store that carries that product. Part of their function is to advertise their offerings and attract new customers.

Some grocery stores regularly double or even triple the value of coupons to bring customers into their stores. Periodic special events double or triple coupon values on certain days or weeks.

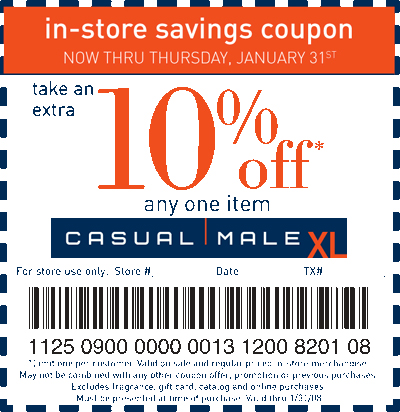
Store coupon offering discounts in a store for an item

== Conveyance ==
Coupons exist in more than one form, and are acquired by customers in a variety of ways.

=== Paper ===
Historically, verifying the discount offered has been via presenting coupons clipped from newspapers or received in the mail. Some retailers and companies use verification methods such as unique barcodes, coupon ID numbers, holographic seals, and watermarked paper as protection from unauthorized copying or use. Other than newspapers, there are also coupon book publishers and retailers who compile vouchers and coupons into books, either for sale or free.

=== Electronic ===
By the mid-1990s, "couponing had also moved to the internet." An early term was clipless coupons. Later on the term "downloadable coupons" came into use. Options include:

- Internet coupons: Online retailers often refer to these as "coupon codes", "promotional codes", "promotion codes", "discount codes", "keycodes", "promo codes", "surplus codes", "portable codes", "shopping codes", "voucher codes", "reward codes", "discount vouchers", "referral codes" or "source codes". These are typed in before the sale is finalized. Marketers can use different codes for different channels or groups in order to differentiate response rates. Free shipping and cashback are additional inducements.
- Mobile: Smartphone based, these are often distributed via WAP Push over SMS or MMS, and presented at the store or online. These also have advertising benefits even after their expiration date.
- Apps: Related to classic coupons are loyalty cards; these have increasingly been superseded by mobile apps.

Iranian government national rations have a mobile app.

== Taxation ==
=== In the United States ===
Typically, when a coupon is issued by the retailer, the tax burden is decreased by the amount of the coupon because the actual price charged to the customer is reduced. Conversely, whether or not manufacturer's coupons reduce the tax burden a consumer has to pay varies by state. In some jurisdictions, such as Colorado, New York, manufacturer's coupons are considered taxable because the amount of the coupon is reimbursed by the manufacturer to the retailer. In other states like Connecticut and Pennsylvania, manufacturers coupons do reduce the tax burden that customers have to pay.

== Trading ==
Coupon manufacturers may or may not place restrictions on coupons limiting their transferability to ensure the coupons stay within the targeted market. Since such restrictions are not universal and are difficult and/or costly to enforce, limited coupon trading is tolerated in the industry. Organized coupon exchange clubs are commonly found in regions where coupons are distributed. Often coupons are available for purchase at some online sites, but since most coupons are not allowed to be sold, the fee is considered to be for the time and effort put into cutting out the coupons.

Some types of coupons may be sold. The New York Times not only said "the traffic is legal" regarding selling airline discount coupons, but wrote "check the commercial notices column in The New York Times or the classified advertising section under 'Miscellaneous') in The Wall Street Journal.

During war time or economic hardships, trading or selling ration coupons is an economic crime.

== See also ==
- Canadian Tire money
- Coupon (bond)
- Drug coupon
- Extreme Couponing
- Trading stamp
- Split payment
