= Iranian labour law =

Rules of employment in Iran

Iranian labour law describes the rules of employment in Iran. As a developing country, Iran is considerably behind many international standards. It has failed to ratify the two basic onventions of the International Labour Organization on freedom of association and collective bargaining, and on the abolition of child labour.

The basic sources of Iranian labour law are,

- The Constitutions and its amendments (1906, 1907, and 1979)
- Civil laws "Ghanon Madani"
- Council of Ministers and Ministry of Labor decrees and procedures (Aein Nameh)
- Judiciary verdicts and cases
- Collective bargaining contracts and agreement
- Common practices and occupational norms
- International Labour Organization (ILO)
- ILO Conventions
- ILO Recommendations
- Other international declarations and agreement

== History ==
The first constitution of Iran, passed in 1906, granted basic rights to the people of Persia through articles eight to twenty five, establishing equality before the law for everyone, and the right to form and join societies (anjumans) and associations (ijtimá'át). The Parliament (Majlis) and the Senate waited 16 years to pass the Civic Servants Employment Act of 1922. It gave protection to labourers and Civic servants. In 1923, the governor of Sistan and Baluchestan ordered a decree in nine articles to protect carpet makers’ rights, including working hours, leaves, and minimum age. It was the first national document of labour rights. In 1928, Parliament passed the Civil Law (Ghanon-e Madanei) which addressed employment contracts. This law divides the employer and employee relations into two categories by benchmarking the French Law. Independent contractors (e.g. carpenters, doctors, lawyers, and plumbers) who control their own work are accountable for their profits and losses. Next, servants who are being paid by an employer to perform specific tasks, but do not have full control of their work, and act upon the employer's instructions and orders.

In 1936, the cabinet issued regulations on minimum hygiene conditions in factories, which was the first attempt to regulate employer-employee relationships. On 18 May 1946, the Council of Ministers passed the labour bill. The first labour minister was appointed that same year, which improved the systematization of labour relations and personnel management. Yet, the working conditions, despite the legislation, were entirely at the whim of enterprise owners because the laws were not enforced, and the Labor Ministry was weak. Employers could do virtually as they wished with no consequences, and they barred the formation of labour unions.

In 1951, a committee was appointed by the Ministry of Labour to translate various countries' labour laws and the international ILO Conventions into Persian in order to do a comparative study and draft a labour law. This effort did not lead to the proposal of a labour law. Then, from 1952 to 1957, various committees established by the ministry of labour and foreign consultants including a Belgian consultant and general secretary of the Middle East labour institute were invited to finalize the draft of labour law, which finally in 1959 voted and passed by the Parliament "Majils". This law was practised until 1990.

The next phase of labour legislation began with the Shah's "White Revolution" "Enghlab Sefied" in 1962. It provided generous welfare and social improvements, such as profit sharing, employee stock ownership plans, company housing, minimum wage, and an improved Social Security Act. All were paid for with revenue from high oil prices. Nevertheless, many private sector owners opposed the new initiatives that infringed on their power. New personnel practices were introduced, including payroll administration with time management, job descriptions, job classifications, evaluations, and organizational hierarchies, mainly in large companies and government-run industries. In the 1960s, progressive private sector entrepreneurs, such as the Ladjevardi family in the Behshar Industrial group, introduced job classifications, personnel policies and procedures, and automated payroll systems following the recommendations of the Iranian National Oil Company’s foreign advisors.

=== After the revolution ===
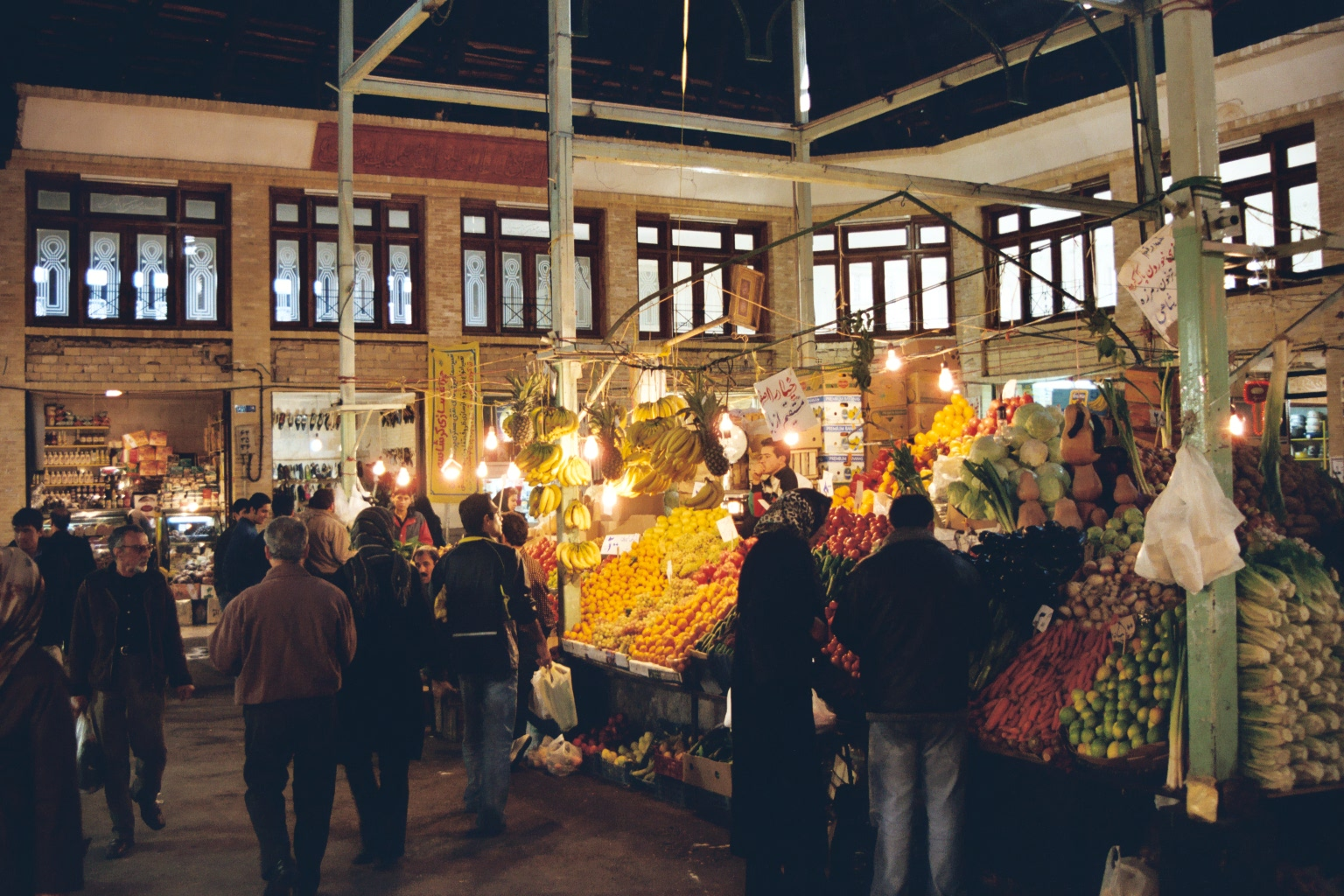
Social security for all employees is compulsory in Iran.

Following the Islamic revolution and the new constitution, this enchanted many with idealistic promises. The new constitution addressed work and labour topics in eleven areas through various articles summarized as the following:

1. Awards freedom of career and occupation
2. Commands for establishment of working hours
3. Elimination of compulsory work
4. Prohibits abuse and exploitation
5. Acknowledges ownership and right to earned wages for worker
6. Prohibits disturbance of business by others
7. Pledges equal opportunity for everyone by providing necessity and amenities
8. Pledges to make available equipment and tools to those able to work if they lack the capability to acquire required equipments and tools
9. Pledges to grant interest free loans for establishment of cooperative institutes and companies
10. Pledges to provide health and hygiene services for diverse age groups
11. Pledges to aid the underprivileged and victims of accident

A new era of labour legislation, shaped after the new Islamic constitution, recognized that progress had occurred following the establishment of the first Islamic Workers Council or (Shora-e Islami Karagaran). This provided workers' rights similar to those of European workers, but under the umbrella of Islam.

During the first two decades of the revolution, the Workers Council influenced many of the personnel management tasks, including recruitment, selection, promotion, job evaluation, salary structure, productivity bonus, health and safety, and many more tasks (even providing employees with a daily milk and food ration). Added to these were establishing and operating factory grocery stores and housing cooperatives. Ironically, many of these tasks became official ink of the 1990 Islamic Republic of Iran Labor law.

The end of the Iran-Iraq war marked the start of economic liberation, as well as a gain for the reformists in Parliament. In this period, a new private sector emerged, challenging the utopian labour laws and regulations. With this, the 1990 labour law was pro-labour and expensive to administer. Management had to seat labour representatives on the company's board of directors, which was unprecedented in the traditional management style of the Iranian private sector, in addition to enforcing many welfare and mandatory benefits.

The first dent in the labour law came about with the introduction of temporary employment contracts that allowed employers to hire employees under a one-year contract with the ability to be reissued year after year after a settlement of the annual "end of services" benefit. The Ministry of Labor issued a communiqué in March 1994 stating that employment under the "fixed terms" contracts was legal.

The government created an ambitious development plan aimed at liberalizing and boosting the economy overnight. The plan contributed in creating a passive labour law. Then, in 2004, the reformists in the Sixth Parliament and the conservatives in the Guardian Council succeeded in reaching an agreement to amend the Labor Law to exempt firms with five or fewer workers from some of its provisions. This provided small entrepreneurs with more freedom in their employment practices.

Finally, in 2006, in response to growing pressures from the private sector for labour law reform, the Ministry of Labor drafted an amendment to deconstruct the "free market". A new law is under consideration based on these amendments.

== Labour law ==
There is a minimum national wage applicable to each sector of activity fixed by the Supreme Labor Council, which is revised annually. In 2010, the minimum wage, determined by the Supreme Labor Council, was about US$303 per month (US$3,636 per year). Membership in the social security system for all employees is compulsory. The national poverty line for Tehran in the year ending 20 March 2008 was $9,612 per year, and the national average was $4,932.

Although Iranian workers have, in theory, a right to form labour unions, there is, in actuality, no union system in the country. Workers are represented ostensibly by the Workers' House, a state-sponsored institution that nevertheless attempts to challenge some state policies. Guild unions operate locally in most areas but are limited largely to issuing credentials and licenses. The right of workers to strike is generally not respected by the state, and since 1979, strikes have often been met by police action.

The comprehensive Labour Law covers all labour relations in Iran, including the hiring of local and foreign staff. The Labor Law provides a very broad and inclusive definition of the individuals it covers, and written, oral, temporary, and indefinite employment contracts are all recognized.

The Iranian Labor Law is very employee-friendly and makes it extremely difficult to lay off staff. Employing personnel on consecutive six-month contracts is illegal, as is dismissing staff without proof of a serious offence. Labour disputes are settled by a special labour council, which usually rules in favour of the employee.

The Labor Law provides the minimum standards an employer must adhere to when forming an employment relationship. The minimum age for workers in Iran is 15 years, but large sectors of the economy (including small businesses, agricultural concerns, and family-owned enterprises) are exempted.

=== Provisions of employment contract ===
To have a valid contract concluded under the Law, the following provisions must be included:

1. Type of Work, vocation or duty that must be undertaken by the worker;
2. Basic compensation and supplements thereto;
3. Working hours, holidays and leaves;
4. Place of performance of duties;
5. Probationary period, if any;
6. Date of conclusion of contract;
7. Duration of employment; and
8. Any other terms and conditions required according to nature of employment.

The employer may require the employee to be subject to a probationary period. However, the probation time may not exceed one month for unskilled workers and three months for skilled and professional workers. During the probation period, either party may immediately terminate the employment relationship without cause or payment of severance pay. The only caveat being that if the employer terminates the relationship, he must pay the employee for the entire duration of the probation period.

=== Suspension of employment contract ===
The fact that the employment contract can be suspended by an employee under certain conditions presents yet another challenge to employers. What this allows is suspension of the employment contract under the following conditions:

1. The period of military service (active, contingency and reserve), as well as voluntary enlistment during conflicts. This period shall be considered part of the employee's service record at place of employment;
2. The closure of a workshop or parts thereof due to force majeure;
3. Educational leave for up to four years; and
4. The period of detention that does not lead to conviction;

Once the conditions giving rise to the suspension of the contract are removed, the employer must allow for return of the employee to work. If the position is filled or eliminated, the employer is obligated to provide a similar position for the employee. Failure to do the above is considered wrongful discharge and subject to legal action.

=== Termination of employment contract ===
The Law allows for termination of the employment contract only under the following instances:

1. Death of employee;
2. Retirement of employee;
3. Total disability of employee;
4. Expiration of the duration of the employment contract;
5. Conclusion of work in task specific contracts; and
6. Resignation of the employee.

The employer is bound to pay benefits under all of the above scenarios according to the years of service.

=== Dismissal of an employee ===
An employee may only be dismissed upon approval of the Islamic Labor Council or the Labor Discretionary Board. Grounds for dismissal include an employee's neglect in carrying out his/her duties or violation of disciplinary by-laws of the employer. The employer must have provided written prior notice of the employee's violations. If the board is not convinced that the employee's dismissal is justified, the employer must reinstate the employee. Once an employee is dismissed, the employer is obligated to provide the legal severance package.

=== Severance and termination benefits ===
The Law mandates the following compensation for terminated, disabled and suspended employee:

1. Suspended Employee – Where an employee is suspended without cause the employer must reinstate the employee and pay for all damages and compensation resulted from the wrongful suspension;
2. Terminated Employee – An employer is under legal obligation to provide thirty (30) days salary for every year of service for employees made redundant or retired;
3. Disabled Employee – The employer must pay 30 days salary for every year of service. Moreover, if disability of an employee is due to working conditions, the employer must pay 60 days salary for every year of employee's service period.

=== Working hours and overtime ===
The workweek in Iran is based on a 44-hour week. Typically, employees work from Saturday to Wednesday (8 hours per day) and half a day on Thursday (4 hours). Any hours worked beyond these will entitle the employee to overtime. The Law mandates a payment of 40% above the hourly wage to employees for any accrued overtime. The employee must consent to overtime work.

=== Holidays and leave ===
Employees are entitled to leave on all official state holidays (approximately 22 days a year) and Fridays. Any employee working during these holidays will be entitled to overtime pay. Additionally, employees are entitled to one-month holiday per annum. The annual leave for those employees engaged in hard and hazardous employment shall be five weeks per annum. Employees are entitled to save up to 9 days of their annual leave.

In case of termination, disability or redundancies, employees must be compensated for any accrued leave. Finally, employees are entitled to 3 days of paid vacation for marriage or death of a spouse, father, mother or child.

=== Maternity leave ===
Women employees are entitled to 90 days of maternity leave. The employee's salary during maternity leave will be paid according to the provisions of the Social Security Act. Maternity leave must be considered part of an employee's service record. Employers must provide returning employees with the same position.

=== Employment of foreign nationals ===
The Law forbids employment of foreign nationals without a proper work permit. Diplomats, United Nations employees and foreign press reporters are exempt from this requirement. A work permit to a foreign national will be issued only if the following conditions are met:

1. Lack of expertise among Iranian nationals;
2. The foreign national being qualified for the position; and
3. The expertise of the foreign national will be used for training of, and later replacement by, Iranian individuals.

Work permits will be issued, renewed or extended for a maximum period of one year. Moreover, no exit visa will be granted to the foreign national unless the national has paid all due taxes, duties, etc. (More info: Employment of Foreign Nationals in Iran)

==== Exemption ====
A new law provides that workshops with less than five employees will not be subject to the labour laws.

=== Health care ===
The Iranian constitution entitles Iranians to basic health care, and most receive subsidized prescription drugs and vaccination programs. An extensive network of public clinics offers basic care at low cost, and general and specialty hospitals operated by the Ministry of Health provide higher levels of care. In most large cities, well-to-do persons use private clinics and hospitals that charge high fees. Specialized medical facilities are concentrated in urban areas, but rural communities have relatively good access to primary care physicians at clinics in villages, where the government-sponsored primary health care system has raised the level of health education and prenatal care since the late 1990s.

=== Social protection ===
Iran has a comprehensive social protection system with some 28 social insurance, social assistance, and disaster relief programs benefiting large segments of the population. These programs include training and job-search assistance, health and unemployment insurance, disability, old-age and survivorship pensions, and in kind- or in-kind transfers including subsidies (e.g., housing, food, energy), rehabilitation and other social services (e.g. long-term care services for the elderly), and even marriage and burial assistance.

Despite significant achievements in human development and poverty reduction, serious challenges to growth call for reform. While labour-market pressures continue to increase because of demographic dynamics and increased participation of women in the labour force, Iran's economy is still unable to generate enough needed jobs to absorb the new flows into the labour market and at the same time reduce unemployment extensively.

In addition to income tax, employers are required to contribute to the State Social Security Fund and the Employment Fund. For social security and unemployment insurance, the employee pays 7% of salary (between the ages of 18 and 65), employer (20 to 23%), the State (3%). Independent workers pay 12–18%, depending on the type of coverage sought. In 2003 the minimum standard pension was 50 per cent of the worker's earnings but not less than the amount of the minimum wage.

The social security makes it possible to ensure the employees against unemployment, the disease, old age (retirement pension), the occupational accidents. Iran did not legislate in favour of a universal social protection, but in 1996, the Center of the statistics of Iran estimates that more than 73% of the Iranian population is covered by a Social Security. The Organization of the social security, managed by the Ministry of social protection, delivers also family benefits and of maternity under certain conditions. Iran spent 22.5 per cent of its 2003 national budget on social welfare programs. More than 50 per cent of that amount covered pensions.

Welfare programs for the needy are managed by more than 30 individual public agencies and semi-state organizations called Bonyad, as well as by several private non-governmental organizations. In 2003 the government began to consolidate its welfare organizations in an effort to eliminate redundancy and inefficiency.

== See also ==
- Iranian Labour News Agency
- List of trade unions in Iran
  - Syndicate of Workers of Tehran and Suburbs Bus Company
- Taxation in Iran
- Economy of Iran (Including Labor force)
- International Rankings of Iran in Economy
- List of major economic laws in Iran
- Iran travel guide from Wikivoyage
- British labour law
- Bonyad - Iran's foundations which control 20% of Iran's GDP.
- Constitution of Iran
- Government of Iran
- Education in Iran
- Iran's brain drain
