= Ministry of Welfare and Social Security =

Agency overview
- Formed: 2004
- Dissolved: 2011
- Superseding agency: Ministry of Cooperatives, Labour and Social Welfare
- Jurisdiction: Islamic Republic of Iran
- Child agencies: Social Security Organization; Civil Servants Pension Organization
- Website: Official Website

The Ministry of Welfare and Social Security (Persian: وزارت رفاه و تأمین اجتماعی, Vâzart-e Refah-e vâ Tamin-e Ajtema'i) established in 2004 and dissolved in 2011, was an Iranian government body responsible for the oversight of Social security in Iran.

== See also ==
- Social security in Iran
- Health care in Iran
- Subsidy reform plan
- Iranian labor law
- Social Security Organization (Iran)
- Civil Servants Pension Organization
- Iran's religious foundations
- Iran Technical and Vocational Training Organization
- Government of Iran
  - Ministry of Labour and Social Affairs (Iran)
