= Social Security Organization =

Social welfare organization in Iran

- سازمان تأمین اجتماعی
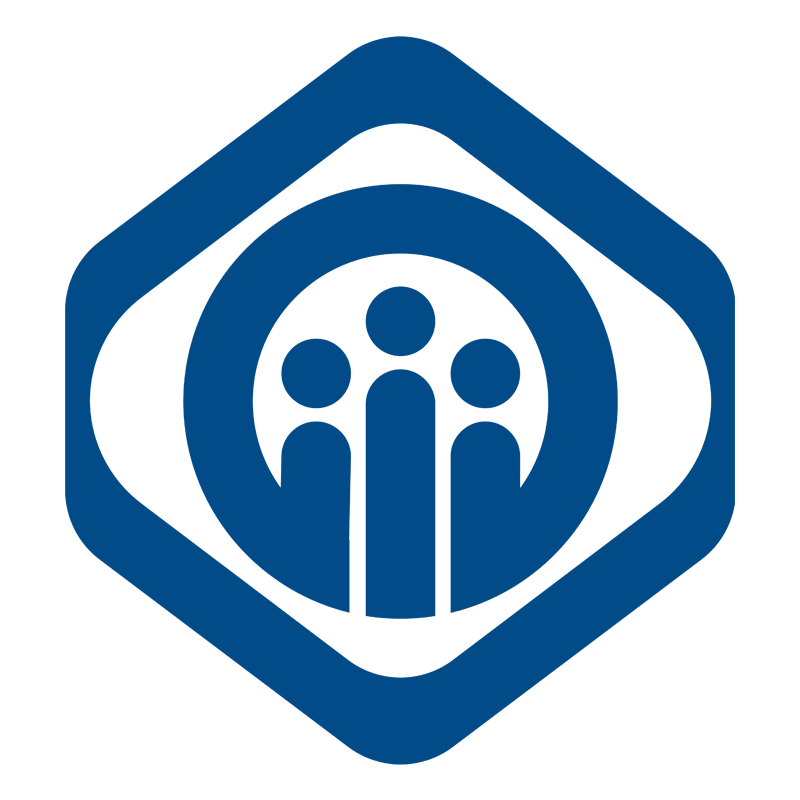

Agency overview
- Formed: 1950
- Jurisdiction: Islamic Republic of Iran
- Headquarters: Tehran, Iran
- Agency executive: Gholam-Hossein Mohammadi (acting), Chief executive officer
- Parent agency: Ministry of Cooperatives, Labour, and Social Welfare
- Website: en.tamin.ir

The Social Security Organization (SSO) is Iran’s principal social insurance institution. It administers compulsory and voluntary insurance schemes for employees, wage earners, and segments of the self-employed population.

The organization operates under the Social Security Law adopted in 1975, which consolidated earlier pension and insurance arrangements into a single national framework.

== Coverage and legal framework ==
Iran does not operate a universal social protection system. Participation in the social insurance system is mandatory for employees under Iranian labor law, while certain self-employed groups may participate on a voluntary basis.

According to estimates published by the Statistical Center of Iran in the 1990s, more than 70 percent of the population was covered by at least one form of social insurance.

The SSO is classified as a non-governmental public institution and is primarily financed through insurance contributions. These contributions are shared between insured individuals, employers, and the state, in proportions defined by statute.

Separate pension systems exist for civil servants, members of the armed forces, law enforcement personnel, and the Islamic Revolutionary Guard Corps.

== Benefits and services ==
The organization administers statutory benefits including old-age pensions, disability and survivor pensions, unemployment insurance, workplace injury compensation, and health insurance coverage through affiliated medical facilities. Additional protections apply in cases such as maternity, loss of a household breadwinner, and legally defined social vulnerability, subject to eligibility criteria established in law.

== Early retirement ==
Early retirement is permitted under defined legal conditions. Individuals aged sixty or older with fewer than ten years of contribution history may qualify for proportionate pension benefits, calculated as a partial entitlement relative to the standard pension formula.

== Financial position ==
Government arrears to the Social Security Organization have been reported by domestic and international media outlets to amount to several thousand trillion rials by the early 2020s. Fiscal pressures on the pension system were cited during the drafting of Iran’s Seventh Development Plan, which introduced statutory adjustments to retirement age thresholds and contribution periods.

== Statistics ==
The table below summarizes selected indicators reported by official and semi-official sources.

Indicator	Year	Figure	Source
Insured contributors (ages 18–65)	2014	~12 million	
Total beneficiaries (contributors and dependents)	2014	~37 million	
Pension recipients (old age, disability, survivors)	2013	~2 million	
Estimated government arrears	2023	~6,600 trillion rials	

== Affiliated institutions ==
The Social Security Organization controls a network of affiliated entities, primarily through the Social Security Investment Company (Shasta). These holdings operate across sectors including telecommunications, pharmaceuticals, energy, healthcare, manufacturing, finance, hospitality, and real estate. Notable affiliated entities include RighTel and Refah Bank.

== See also ==
- Civil Servants Pension Organization
- Economy of Iran
- Iranian labor law
