= Iranian Labour News Agency =

Iranian News Agency

- خبرگزاری کار ایران یا ایلنا
- Abbreviation: ILNA
- Formation: February 24, 2003; 23 years ago
- Type: News agency
- Official language: Persian
- Parent organization: Close to the Worker House
- Website: www.ilna.ir/en

Iranian Labour News Agency (ILNA) is an Iranian news agency.

== History and profile ==
ILNA was launched in Tehran on 24 February 2003, and provides coverage of the country's trade unions.

In 2007 ILNA was closed down and relaunched in July 2008.

ILNA provided TV coverage of the 89th Academy Awards, where The Salesman won for Best Foreign Language Film.
