= List of Iranian research centers =

Research Centers in Iran	Field of activity
Endocrinology and Metabolism Research Institute (EMRI), Tehran	Medicine
Diabetes Research Centre( Affiliated to the EMRI), Tehran	Medicine
Osteoporosis Research Centre( Affiliated to the EMRI), Tehran	Medicine
Endocrinology and Metabolism Research Centre( Affiliated to the EMRI), Tehran	Medicine
Metabolic Disorders Research Center ( Affiliated to the EMRI), Tehran	Medicine
Biosensor Research Center ( Affiliated to the EMRI), Tehran	Medicine
Center for Reliability Research ( Affiliated to the ARI), Tehran	Engineering and Science
Obesity Research Center ( Affiliated to the EMRI), Tehran	Medicine
Noncommunicable Diseases Research Center ( Affiliated to the EMRI), Tehran	Medicine
Chronic Diseases Research Center ( Affiliated to the EMRI), Tehran	Medicine
Elderly Health Research Center ( Affiliated to the EMRI), Tehran	Medicine
Medical Ethics and History of Medicine Research Centre, Tehran	Medicine
The Academy of Arts of Iran, Tehran	Humanities
Iranian Clinical Research Organization, ArasClin, Tehran	Medicine
Iranian National Institute for Oceanography and Atmospheric Science (INIOAS), Tehran	Science
Iranian Academy of Medical Sciences, Tehran	Bio-science
The Academy of Sciences of Iran, Tehran	Science
Agricultural Biotechnology Research Institute of Iran, Karaj	Bio-science
Avicenna Research Institute, Tehran	Medicine
Biotechnology Study Center, Tehran	Bio-science
Persian Gulf Studies Center	Political and social sciences
Hematology oncology and Genetics research center, Yazd	Bio-science
Cad/cam Research Center of Tehran Polytechnic University	Engineering
Center for Strategic Research	Political and social sciences
Chemistry & Chemical Engineering Research Center of Iran, Tehran	Engineering
Civil Aviation Technology College, Tehran	Engineering
Iranian Space Research Center, Tehran	Engineering
Institute for Cognitive Science Studies	Medicine
Academy of Persian Language and Literature, Tehran	Humanities
Iranian Substance Use and Dependency Research Center, Tehran	Medicine
National Institute for Genetic Engineering and Biotechnology, Tehran	Bio-science
Institute of Geophysics	Engineering
Geological Survey of Iran, Tehran	Engineering
Hematology-Oncology Research Center and Stem Cell Transplantation	Medicine
Institute for Advanced Studies in Basic Sciences (IASBS), Zanjan	Science
Institute for Research and Planning in Higher Education	Education
Institute for Educational Research, Tehran	Education
http://webarchive.loc.gov/all/20151105051602/http%3A//www.scwmri.ac.ir/en/ Conservation and Watershed Management Research Institute, Tehran]	Engineering
https://web.archive.org/web/20151116045515/http://www.ihcs.ac.ir/Pages/Features/Home.aspx Institute for Humanities & Cultural Studies (IHCS), Tehran]	Humanities
Institute for Iranian Contemporary Historical Studies, Tehran	Humanities
Institute for Political & International Studies, Tehran (IPIS)	Political and social sciences
Institute for Management and Planning Studies, Tehran	Economics
Institute for Studies in Theoretical Physics & Mathematics (IPM), Tehran	Science
Research Center of Environment and Sustainable Development	Multisectoral
Agricultural Planning and Economic Research Institute	Economics
Agricultural Research and Education Organization	Science
Institute of Biochemistry and Biophysics	Science
Institute of International Energy Studies, Tehran	Energy
International Center for Islamic Studies, Qum	Humanities
International Institute of Earthquake Engineering and Seismology	Engineering
Iran Bioinformatics Center	Bio-science
Iran Centre for Management Studies, Tehran	Economics
Iran Management & Productivity Study Centre (IMPSC), Tehran	Economics
Institute for Productivity & Human Resource Development	Economics
Iran Polymer & Petrochemical Institute (IPPI), Tehran	Engineering
Institute of Standards and Industrial Research of Iran	Engineering
Iran Telecommunications Research Center (ITRC), Tehran	Engineering
Academic Center for Education, Culture & Research (ACECR), Tehran	Education
Iranian Color Research Center, Tehran	Engineering
Iranian Cultural Heritage Organization, Tehran	Humanities
Iranian Research Institute for Information Science and Technology (IRANDOC), Tehran	Informatics
Iranian Institute for Health Sciences Research (IHSR), Tehran	Medicine
Iranian Research Organization for Science and Technology (IROST), Tehran	Science
National Cancer Society of Iran, Tehran	Medicine
National Nutrition and Food Technology Research Institute (NNFTRI), Tehran	Bio-science
National Research Institute of Tuberculosis & Lung Disease, Tehran	Medicine
National Research Center for Genetic Engineering and Biotechnology (NRCGEB), Tehran	Bio-science
Niroo Research Institute, Tehran	Energy
Pasteur Institute of Iran, Tehran	Medicine
Water Research Institute, Tehran	Energy
Research Institute of Hawzeh & University, Qom	Humanities
Research Institute of Petroleum Industry (RIPI), Tehran	Energy
Research Institute of Strategic Studies (RISS), Tehran	Political and social sciences
Seraj Institute of Technology, Tehran	Informatics
Rajaie Cardiovascular, Medical and Research Center, Tehran	Political and social sciences
Sina Trauma & Surgery Research Center (STSRC), Tehran	Medicine
Royan Institute	Bio-science
Avionics Research Institute, Isfahan	Aviation Electronics
Financial and Investment Group affiliated with Center for Technology Studies of Sharif University of Technology, Tehran	Finance and Investment
Statistical Research and Training Center, Tehran	Multisectoral
Islamic Parliament Research Center	Political and social sciences
Iran Research Academy, Center of behavior science and personality study, Tehran	Political and social sciences
Iran Oil & Gas market and partnership Research Center	Market & partnership Oil & Gas
National Research Institute for Science Policy	Political and social sciences
Iran Research Organization for Science and Technology	Science
Iran Science Network	Science
Biotechnology Study Center	Bio-science
Iranian Institute for Philosophy	Humanities
Pharmaceutical Sciences Research Center	Bio-science
Iranian Society of Toxicology	Medicine
Niroo Research Institute	Energy
National Research Center for Genetic Engineering and Biotechnology	Bio-science
Iran Academy of Sciences	Science
Iran Academy of Medical Sciences	Medicine
International Association of Iranian Managers	Economics
Department of High Tech Industries / Information Network for Electronic Industries	Engineering
Research Institute of Plant Protection	Bio-science
Social Health Determinants Research Center, Shahrekord University of Medical sciences, Shahrekord, Iran	Health Determinants
Hayk Mirzayans Insect Museum	Bio-science
Iran Small Industries & Industrial Parks Organization (ISIPO)	Economics
Iranian National Laser Center	Engineering
Iranian Institute of Cell & Gene Therapy, Tehran, Iran	Biotechnology
Materials and Energy Research Center	Energy and Materials
Iran Nanotechnology Initiative Council	Engineering
Science Academy	Science
Iran's Agricultural Research and Education Organization	Bio-science
Iran National Salinity Research Center	Engineering
Iran Pistachi Research Institute	Bio-science
Plant Pathology Research Institute of Iran	Bio-science
Road, Housing and Urban Development Research Center	Road and Housing
Razi Institute for Serums and Vaccines, Karaj	Bio-science
Pervasive and Cloud Computing Laboratory (PerLab), Birjand	Engineering
Iran Telecommunication Research Center	Engineering
Atmospheric Science and Meteorological Research Center, Tehran	Meteorological

== See also ==
- Science and technology in Iran
- Iran National Science Foundation
- List of universities in Iran

Stem Cell Research Center, Tabriz University of Medical Sciences, Tabriz, Iran Drug Applied Research Center, Tabriz University of Medical Sciences, Tabriz, Iran
