= Abbas Shafiee =

Iranian pharmaceutical chemist (1937–2016)

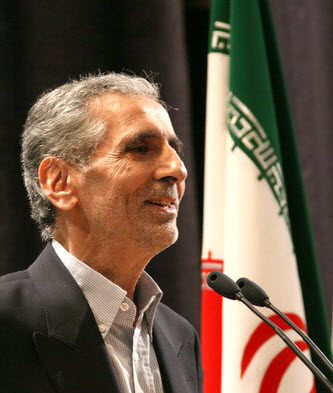
Professor Abbas Shafiee (1937–2016)

Abbas Shafiee (September 25, 1937 – June 15, 2016) was an Iranian pharmaceutical chemist. He was the president of faculty of pharmacy at Tehran University. He published more than 350 scientific articles in peer-reviewed international journals.

Shafiee received his degree in Pharmacy from Tehran University in 1962, later earning a master's from Columbia University's College of Pharmaceutical Sciences in 1965, and a Ph.D. in Pharmaceutical Chemistry from the same institution in 1968.

== Selected honoraria ==
- National Winner of Merit, Lunsford Richardson Award for graduate research (USA), 1968
- Research Award, Tehran University, 1972
- Ministry of Higher Education award for Research, 1974
- First Degree Kharazmi Award, 1987
- Permanent Member of Iranian Academy of Medical Sciences 1990.
- Member of Iranian Academy of Science, Tehran 1991.
- Tehran University's Highest Honorary Award, 1994
- Iranian Chemical Society Year's Chemist, 1995
- His book, Chromatography and spectroscopy, was named best book of the year and received the corresponding award from the Interior Ministry in 1996 and the Ministry of Health in 1995
- Doctor of Science (Honoris Causa), University of Colombo, Sri Lanka, 1998
- First degree Razi Award, 1998
- Second degree National Award for Research, 1999
- Best National Book of the Year, 2000

== Books ==
- Chromatography and Spectroscopy, Tehran University Publications, 1373.
- Antibiotics, Tehran University Press, 1371.
- Asm, Academic Publishing Center, 2013.
- An introduction to the mechanism of organic chemistry reactions, Tehran University Press, 1354.
- Jahangiri's Guide to Good Psychopharmacology Prescribing: A Practical Manual English - Persian Edition; Lap Lambert Academic Publishing, Germany (2018-05-04). Hamideh Jahangiri, Alireza Norouzi, Abbass Shafiee. ISBN 978-613-8-38586-8.
- Jahangiri's Medical Dictionary, English-Persian Volume 4 (Pharmacotherapy), Lap Lambert Academic Publishing, Germany (2018-02-16). Hamideh Jahangiri, Alireza Norouzi, Abbass Shafiee. ISBN 978-613-7-38206-6.

== See also ==
- Hassan Farsam
- Ahmad Reza Dehpour
- Iranian science
- Intellectual movements in Iran
