= Surena (robot) =

Series of Iranian humanoid robots

Surena (Persian: سورنا) is a series of Iranian humanoid robots, named after the Parthian General Surena. The Institute of Electrical and Electronics Engineers (IEEE) has placed the Surena among the prominent robots in the world after analyzing its performance.

== SURENA I (Surena 1) ==
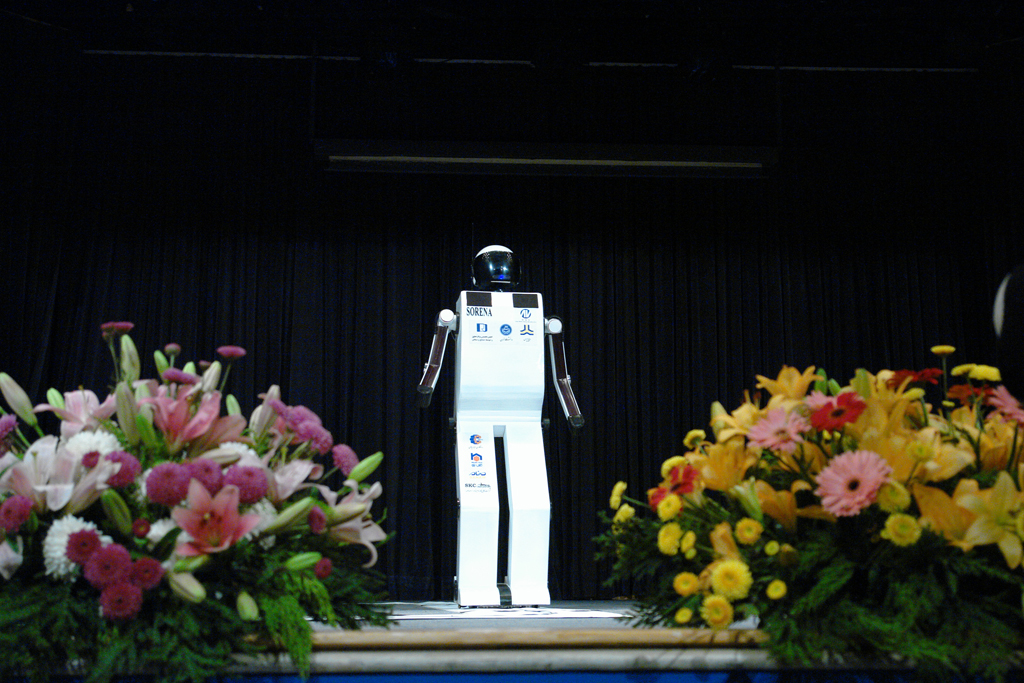
SURENA I

SURENA I(1) project was built at the Center for Advanced Vehicles (CAV), University of Tehran, with financial support from the R&D Society of Iranian Industries and Mines. SURENA's height and weight are 1.65 metres and 60 kilograms, respectively. It can synthesize speech in Persian, move along paths, and play a basic version of football.

The first SURENA humanoid robot was designed in 2007 with 8 degrees of freedom.

SURENA was developed to demonstrate the University's capability in human robotics.

== SURENA II (Surena 2) ==
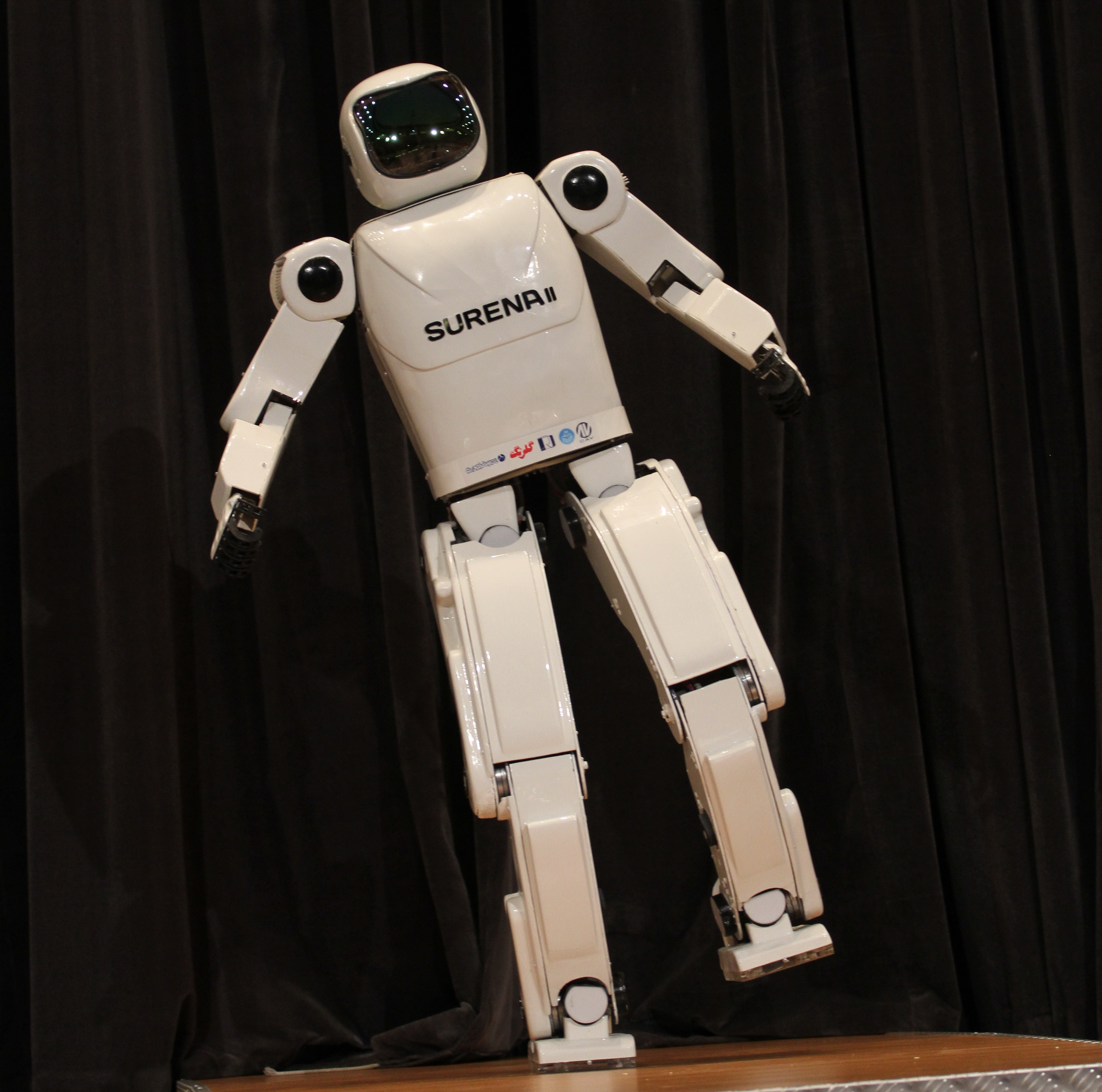
SURENA II

SURENA II is an adult-sized humanoid robot that was created at the University of Tehran in Iran under the direction of Professor Aghil Yousefi-Koma. SURENA II was built by a team of 20 engineers and students in less than two years, and was unveiled in Tehran on July 3 as part of the country’s celebration of “Industry and Mine Day” by Iranian President Mahmoud Ahmadinejad. This upgraded version of SURENA I came with several capabilities such as the ability to walk like a human being, bow, and stand on one leg. SURENA II weighs in at 45 kilograms and stands at 1.45 meters tall with a total of 22 degrees of freedom (DoF): the legs have each 6 DoF, the arms 4 DoF, and the head 2 DoF. To make the robot walk and move its head, an operator uses a remote controller. Using a feedback control system that provides dynamic balance results in much more human-like motion and a reliance on gyroscopes and accelerometers to remain stable. Professor Yousefi-Koma, the director of both the Center for Advanced Vehicles (CAV) and the Advanced Dynamic and Control Systems Laboratory (ADCSL) at the University of Tehran, stated the goals are to explore “both theoretical and experimental aspects of bipedal locomotion” and to “demonstrate to students and the public the excitement of a career in engineering”.

== SURENA III (Surena 3) ==
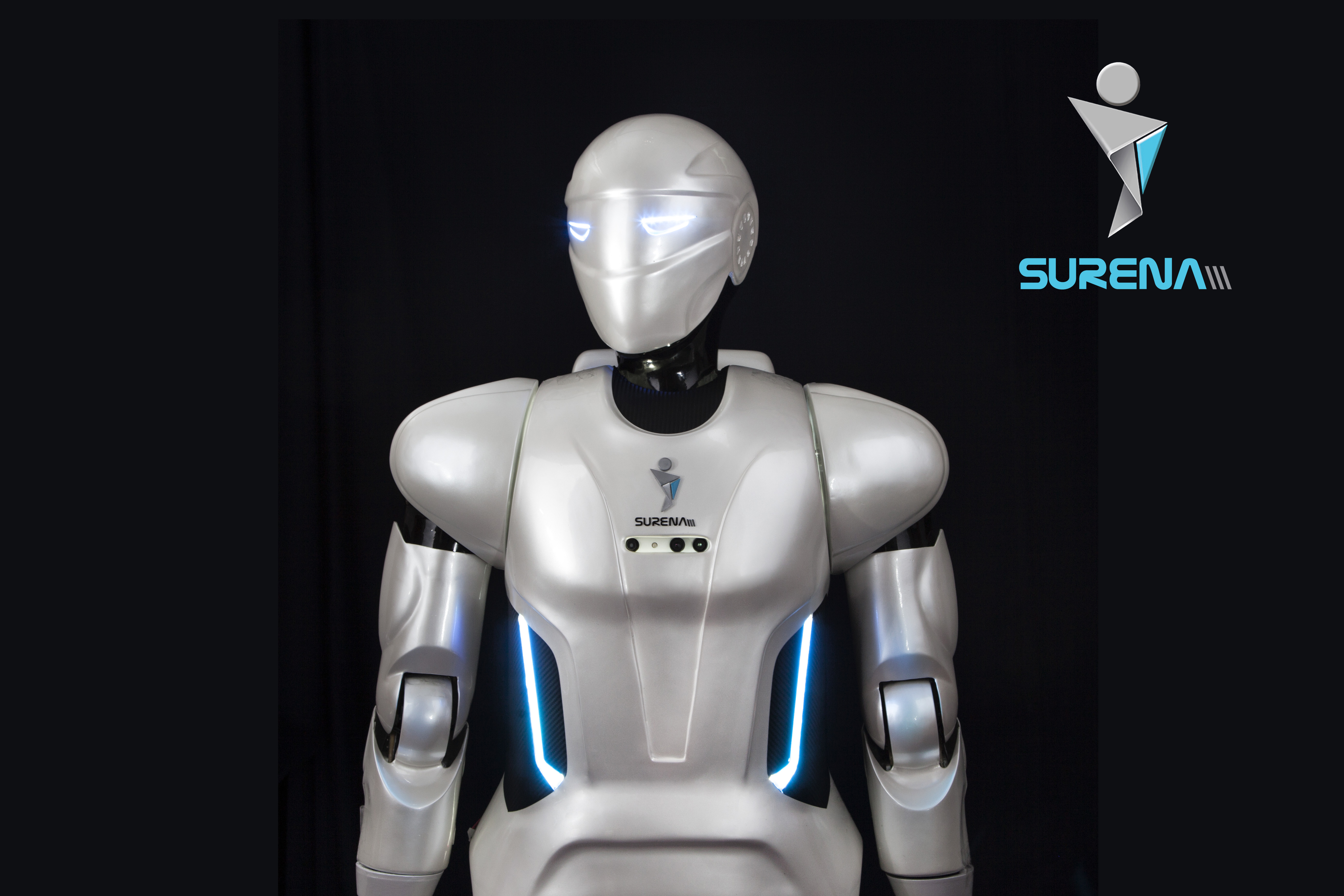
SURENA III

The next iteration of Surena was funded by the Industrial Development and Renovation Organization (IDRO) of Iran and built by a team of 70 at the University of Tehran. Its increased degrees of freedom (31) came with a higher weight of 98 kg and 1.98 metre height, as well as improvements in maneuverability, speed and intelligence. SURENA III implemented new sensor and motor control systems, as well as some artificial intelligence.

== SURENA IV (Surena 4) ==
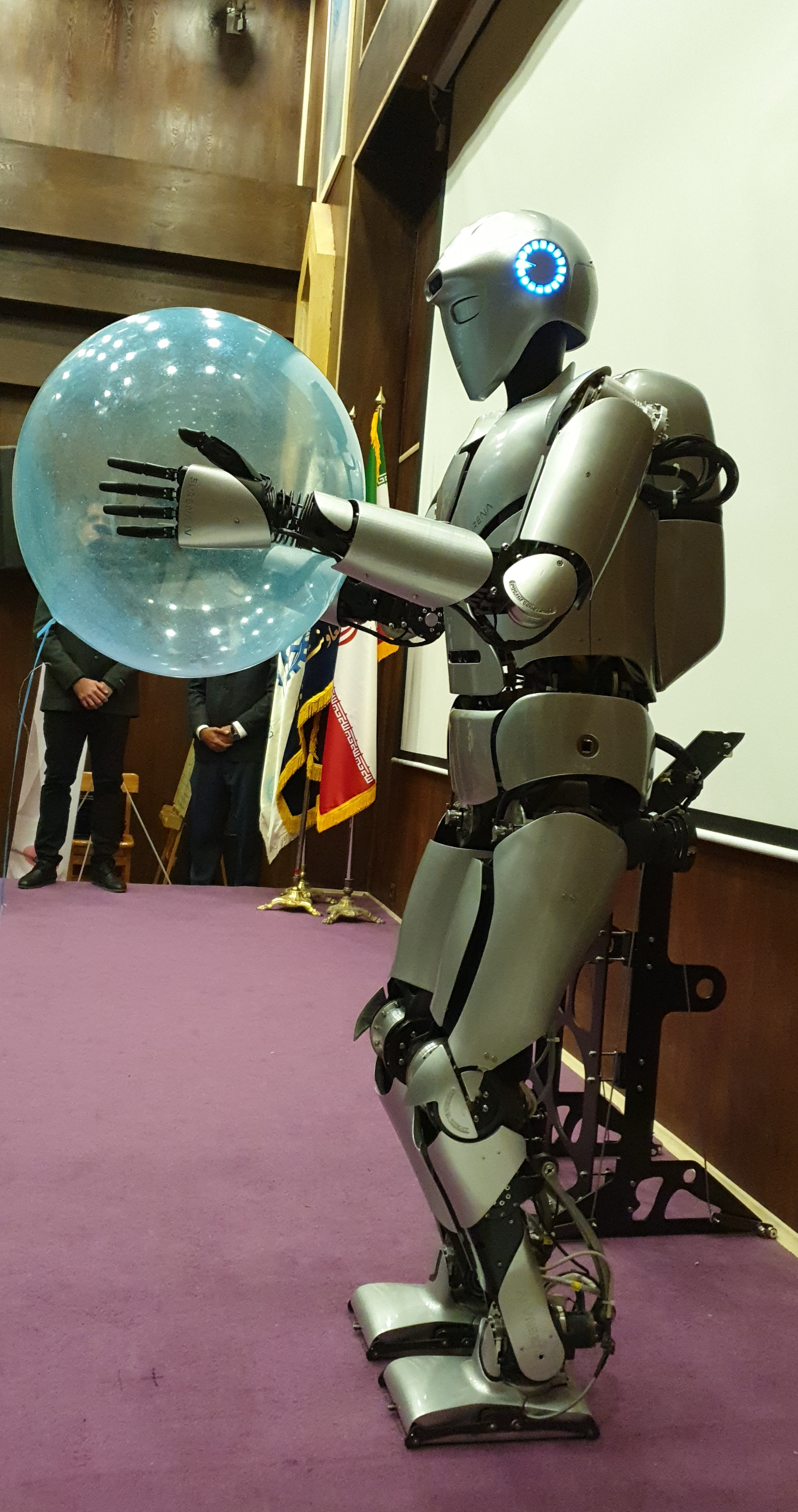
SURENA IV, whole-body gripping motion

On December 14, 2019, the fourth generation of Surena humanoid robot was officially unveiled. The robot has been developed in CAST (Center of Advanced Systems and Technologies) by more than 50 researchers under the supervision of Dr. Aghil Yousefi-Koma, Professor of Mechanical Engineering at the University of Tehran. The performance included both upper and lower body motions, interaction with a host and speech. The project is funded by the presidential deputy for science and technology and is considered as the symbol of technological advancement in the direction of peace and humanity with the goal of designing an appropriate research platform, more developed than previous versions.

The first and simplest version of the robot (SURENA I, 2008) had only 8 degrees of freedom (DoF) and the second one (SURENA II, 2010) had 22 DoF with a walking speed of 0.03 meters per second. Compared to the third generation (SURENA III, 2015) which had 31 DoF, the new adult-sized Humanoid robot has 43 DoF and higher dexterity in the hands, making it able to grip different objects with different shapes. SURENA IV is 1.7 meters tall and has a mass of 68 kilograms; it is much lighter and smaller than SURENA III (98 kilograms and 1.9 meters tall) due to the better structure design based on topology optimization, compact customized actuator design, and the SLA 3D printing technology used for its cover.

In the new generation, the control loop frequency has been increased to 200 Hz by exploiting FPGA board, making it possible to implement online controllers and estimators. By the means of Robot Operation System (ROS), state monitoring, real time implementation of algorithms, and simultaneous running of several programs have become straightforward.

Improving the robot- interaction with the environment was one of the main goals in the SURENA IV project. The robot has the abilities of face detection and counting, object detection and position measurement, activity detection, speech recognition (speech to text) and speech generation (text to speech), resulting to achieve better voice user interface. Online grip, face and object follow, and action imitation have been implemented by combining AI abilities and whole-body motion planning.

While the mean speed of SURENA III was 0.3 kilometers per hour, SURENA IV can walk continuously with a speed of 0.7 kilometers per hour, thanks to the dynamic motion of its center of mass and online controllers. The robot can walk on uneven terrain using novel contact sensors in its sole. Researchers at CAST have developed online contact controllers to adjust the angle and position of foot during stepping. Gazebo, Choreonoid, and MATLAB have been used to simulate the motion of the robot and evaluate different scenarios including upper body and lower body motions (e.g. side walking, backward walking, turning around, and push recovery).

Specifications	Surena 4	Surena 3
Walking	Online walking; Forward speed: 0.7 km/h continuously; Turning with arbitrary radius; Side walk; Backward walk	Forward speed: 0.3 km/h with point velocity of 0.7 km/h; Turning with arbitrary radius; Backward walk; Walking up and down on stairs (5 cm heights) and slopes (10 degrees)
Moving on uneven surfaces	Stable on uneven surfaces with different height with maximum velocity	Stable on uneven surfaces with different height
Vision	Face detection and face follow; Object detection and recognition and object follow; Body skeleton detection and whole-body imitation; Activity detection	Face detection; Object detection and recognition; Body skeleton detection and upper-body imitation
Audition	Speech recognition (more various words and sentences)	Speech recognition (limited words and sentences)
Speaking	Utilize unlimited words and sentences in smart scenarios using TTS (Text To Speech)	Utilize unlimited words and sentences by recorded voice
Software	ROS (Robot Operation System) used for interaction between software and hardware, make it simple to apply any changes in programs; Gazebo used for simulating any tasks and scenarios by the help of the modeled robot	SDK (Standard Developing Kit) designed to create and edit different scenarios, GUI (graphical user interface) special for system controlling
Object Manipulation	Online force controlled gripping (able to manipulate objects with different shapes and material, follow the object with hand)	Able to manipulate objects up to 6.5 mm in diameter and weight up to 200g
Exhibitive Maneuvers	Able to Write; Whole-body motion generation; Shooting a ball with different diameters; Drilling; Performing some exhibitive actions; Able to perform arbitrary scenarios including physical abilities and intelligence of the robot	Shooting a ball with different diameters; Performing some exhibitive actions

== Videos ==
- Surena 4 Official Video
- Surena 3 Video by IEEE

== See also ==
- Science and technology in Iran
- Humanoid robot
