= Samuel Rahbar =

Iranian biologist

Samuel Rahbar (Persian: سموئیلِ رهبر Samu'il-e Rahbar May 12, 1929 - November 10, 2012) was an Iranian scientist who discovered the linkage between diabetes and HbA1C, a form of hemoglobin used primarily to identify plasma glucose concentration over time.

Rahbar was born into a Jewish family in the Iranian city of Hamedan in 1929. He obtained his MD degree from the University of Tehran in 1953 and a PhD degree in immunology from the same university in 1963.

From 1952 to 1960 Rahbar pursued mainly clinical activities in Abadan and Tehran, returning to academic life as a postdoctoral fellow in 1959. After earning his PhD, he was promoted to assistant professor in 1963 and to associate professor in 1965 in the Department of Immunology.

Rahbar spent 1968–1969 as a visiting scientist at the Department of Medicine of the Albert Einstein College of Medicine in New York, where he collaborated with Helen M. Ranney. After his return to Tehran, Rahbar was promoted to full professor in 1970 and to director of the Department of Applied Biology in the University of Tehran Medical School in Tehran.

After the Islamic Revolution in Iran, Rahbar was laid off from his position as Director of the Department of Applied Biology at Tehran University. As a result of this unfair treatment he decided to take his family and leave the country in 1979.

1979 Rahbar became a researcher and professor of diabetes in the Department of Diabetes, Endocrinology, and Metabolism at the City of Hope in Duarte, California (in Los Angeles County).

In 2012, the American Diabetes Association (ADA) bestowed a special, one-time National Scientific Achievement Award on Rahbar in recognition of his discovery of HbA1c as a marker of glycemic status in persons with diabetes. The award is named after the awardee and is called the Samuel Rahbar Outstanding Discovery Award.

== See also ==
- Iranian science
