= Human capital flight from Iran =

Emigration of highly educated people from Iran

Human capital flight from Iran has been a significant phenomenon since the Islamic Revolution of 1979. According to the International Monetary Fund (IMF), Iran had a substantial drain of highly skilled and educated individuals (15 percent) in the early 1990s. More than 150,000 Iranians left the Islamic Republic every year in the early 1990s, and an estimated 25 percent of all Iranians with post-secondary education then lived abroad in OECD-standard developed countries. A 2009 IMF report indicated that Iran tops the list of countries that are losing their academic elite, with a loss of 150,000 to 180,000 specialists—roughly equivalent to a capital loss of US$50 billion. In addition, the political crackdown following the 2009 Iranian election protests is said to have created a "spreading refugee exodus" of Iranian intelligentsia. It has also been reported that the Central Intelligence Agency of the United States is running a covert operation code-named "Braindrain Project" with the aim of luring away nuclear-oriented Iranian talent, thus undermining Iran's nuclear program.

In February 2024, the Iranian government initiated efforts to stem the flow of educated individuals leaving the country, focusing on increased surveillance and potential restrictions on movement. On September 2026, the Iranian judiciary closed and sealed the French language training institute affiliated with the French Embassy in Tehran on charges of facilitating the departure of elites from the country.

== Background ==
Between 1991 and 1999, job creation in Iran could provide for "less than 60 percent of those entering the job market", according to a 2003 United Nations Common Country Assessment of Iran's development.

The Central Intelligence Agency estimates that 77 percent of the 51 million Iranians aged 15 and over can read and write. A significant majority of this population is at or approaching collegiate levels. Among the factors contributing to the brain-drain in Iran are: "economic well-being and better educational prospects abroad. The inability of the home country to respond to its citizens' needs, coupled with high unemployment rates and a general lack of intellectual and social security, all contribute to the brain-drain. Additionally, self-censorship prevents people from thinking and writing freely, a limitation that makes both scientific and social science research extremely difficult".

Intense competition for university seats in Iran also play a role. Only about 11 percent of the approximately 1.5 million people who take exams annually are accepted into a university. Even after acquiring an undergraduate degree, young people find that there are few jobs available. According to official statistics, of the 270,000 university graduates entering the labour market each year, an estimated 75,000 can find jobs. The flight of human capital costs the government over $38 billion annually, two times the revenues received from selling oil. Under the provisions of a five-year development plan, the country is trying to create jobs for its unemployed population, though the results of these efforts have not yet materialized. Consequently, the country remains unable to benefit from its educated diaspora or its pool of unemployed experts at home."

== History ==
Emigration from Iran is said by one source to have started in earnest with conscription for the Iran–Iraq War. The government's need for new soldiers and the high mortality rate of those troops led to the flight of draft-age Iranian men to other countries.

Another factor may have been the Iranian Cultural Revolution, which occurred after the 1979 Islamic Revolution. On 12 June 1980, the Cultural Revolution shut down Iran's higher-education system for over a year with the goal of a complete overhaul. Nonetheless, the flight abroad of educated Iranians was commented on as early as 31 October 1980, when its importance was disparaged by the Iranian revolutionary leader Ruhollah Khomeini:

"They say there is a brain drain. Let these decayed brains flee. Do not mourn them, let them pursue their own definitions of being. Is every brain with—what you call—science in it honourable? Shall we sit and mourn the brains that escaped? Shall we worry about these brains fleeing to the US and the UK? Let these brains flee and be replaced by more appropriate brains. Now that they (the Islamic Republic) are filtering, you are sitting worried why they are executing [people]? Why are you discussing these rotten brains of [these] lost people? Why are you questioning Islam? Are they fleeing? To hell with them. Let them flee. They were not scientific brains. All the better. Don't be concerned. They should escape. [Iran] is not a place for them to live any more. These fleeing brains are of no use to us. Let them flee. If you know that this is no place for you, you should flee too."

The trend continued during the Iran–Iraq War, and after a post-war relative calm, picked up once again during the unprecedented incursion of the clerical establishment in Iranian universities, the last firm bastion of Iran's reformists. In November 2005, a cleric became chancellor of the University of Tehran, replacing Dr. Faraji-dana, marking the first time that Iran's clerical establishment replaced traditional academia to head a major academic institution. He has written several books and has served on the faculty of the College of Law as an expert on Islamic jurisprudence.

Iran's brain-drain has become a focus of the media both domestically and internationally. Some blame an impoverished job market (which in turn is blamed by many on Western-imposed economic sanctions), while others blame a tightening social system. As a symptom of this, in 2006, Iranian president Mahmoud Ahmadinejad promised to eradicate all universities from what he called "the liberal and secular influence".

A report by The Washington Prism in January 2006 claims that the International Monetary Fund considers Iran to be ranked highest in brain-drain among developing countries, with an estimated 180,000 people exiting Iran. The Islamic Republic News Agency reports the figure to be 200,000.

According to the Iranian Ministry of Culture and Higher Education, there are approximately 50,000 Iranian students currently studying abroad.

== Efforts to reverse trend ==
In recent years, several measures have been taken to slow down the brain-drain by providing work and research facilities for academics and highly skilled workers. In February 2003, the Iran National Science Foundation was established to promote science and technology in Iran and benefit the welfare of those engaged in research and development.

Another institution founded to deal with the welfare of Iranians working in the sciences and technology is the "Iran National Geniuses" foundation.

Iran has tried to compensate for the brain-drain by introducing the Graduate Record Bill, which calls for the internalization and expansion of education at the graduate level, thus increasing the number of graduates.

== See also ==
- Economy of Iran
- Higher education in Iran
- International rankings of Iran
- Iranian diaspora
- Science and technology in Iran
