= Archives of Academic Emergency Medicine =

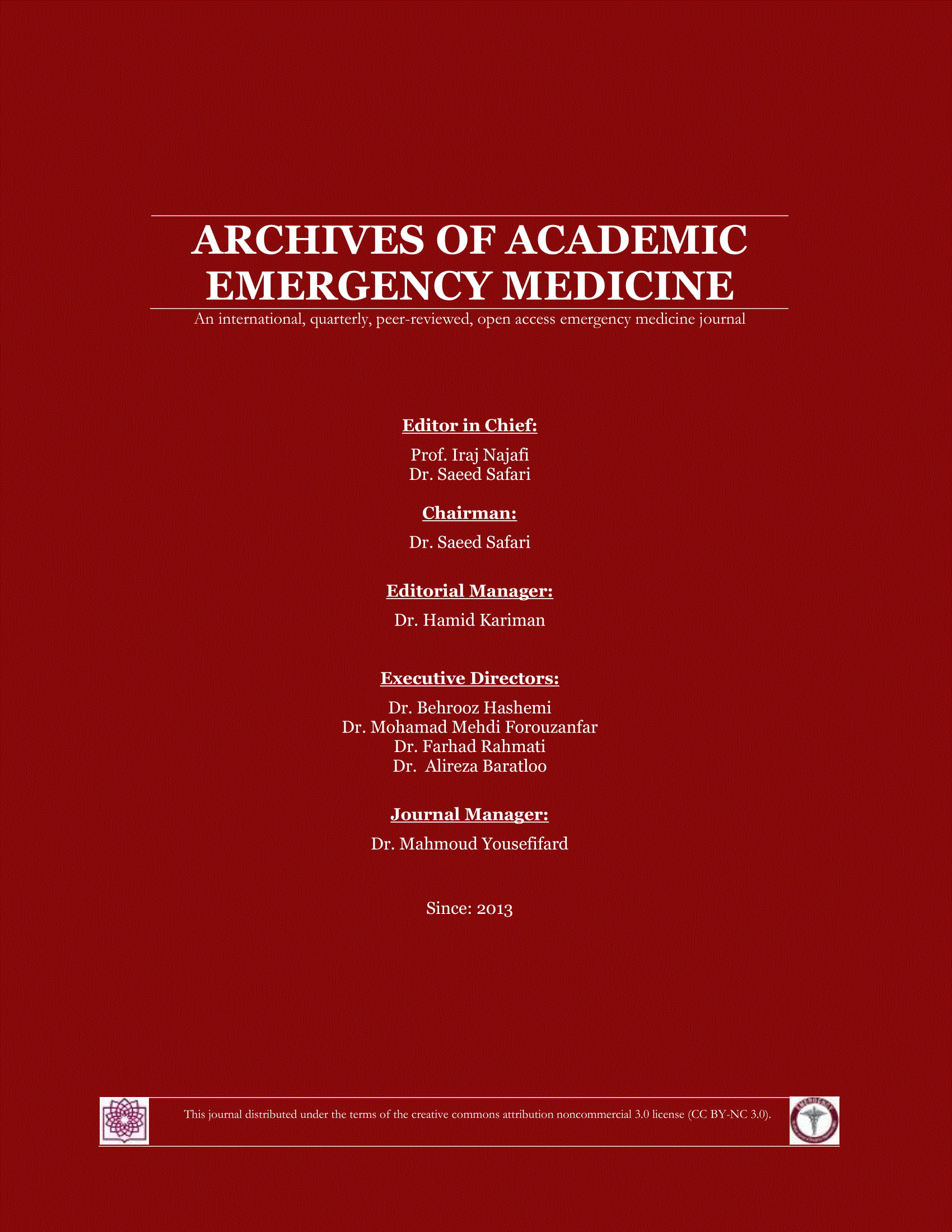
- Discipline: Emergency medicine
- Language: English
- Edited by: Prof. Iraj Najafi and Dr. Saeed Safari

Publication details
- Former name: Emergency
- History: 2013-present
- Publisher: Shahid Beheshti University of Medical Sciences (Iran)
- Frequency: Continuous
- Open access: Yes
- License: CC BY-NC 3.0

Standard abbreviations
- ISO 4: Arch. Acad. Emerg. Med.

Indexing
- ISSN: 2645-4904
- LCCN: 2019243039
- OCLC no.: 1089841025
- Emergency
- ISSN: 2345-4563

Links
- Journal homepage; Online archive

Archives of Academic Emergency Medicine is a peer-reviewed open-access medical journal covering emergency medicine. It was originally established as Emergency in 2013, changing to the current name in 2019, and is published by Shahid Beheshti University of Medical Sciences. The journal has been ranked as a Q1 journal in the SCImago journal ranking since 2021. It has also received an impact factor of 5.4 for the first time in the 2023 Journal Citation Reports (JCR) release for the articles published in 2022, making it a Q1 journal. Based on 2022 Journal Impact Factors, the journal was ranked first in Asia and fifth worldwide among journals published in the field of emergency medicine. It ranked fourth worldwide when considering Journal Impact Factors without self-citations.

== Abstracting and indexing ==
The journal is indexed and abstracted in:

- CINAHL
- Embase
- Emerging Sources Citation Index
- Scopus (2016-2017) and (2019-present)
- PubMed
