= AryoGen =

Iranian pharmaceutical company

- Type: Private Company
- Industry: Pharmaceutical
- Founded: 2009
- Headquarters: Alborz, Iran
- Area served: Worldwide
- Key people: Fereidoun Mahboudi; Chairman
- Products: biopharmaceuticals, Monoclonal antibody
- Revenue: ▲US$ 100 million
- Number of employees: ▲800+ (2025)
- Website: AryoGen

AryoGen Pharmed (Persian: آریوژن فارمد) is an Iranian biopharmaceutical company specializing in manufacturing Therapeutic Monoclonal antibodies and some other recombinant proteins.

== History ==
AryoGen Pharmed is the first and largest mAb producer in MENA region with the vision of manufacturing high-quality biosimilar products for patients suffering from life-threatening diseases around the world and improving patient’s quality of life. AryoGen pharmed produces its own Active Pharmaceutical Ingredients (APIs) Using large-scale bioreactors according to cGMP guidelines, which have been approved by PIC/s members. Research and Development unit with laboratory-scale and pilot-scale production lines is equipped with cell culture equipment such as bioreactors and recombinant protein purification Facility. The state-of-the-art manufacturing sites of AryoGen have received major accreditation such as EU GMP European Medicines Agency (EMA). The quality of all products have been certified by the most reputable laboratories around the world. AryoGen Pharmed has several Tech-Transfer projects in different countries such as Turkey, Russia and Tunisia. In addition, the products of AryoGen Pharmed have been exported to different countries in Asia, Africa and Latin America.

== Products ==
AryoGen's products include:

- Blood Coagulation factor VII with the name of AryoSeven
- Altebrel with the generic name of Etanercept and original trade name of Enbrel
- Zytux with the generic name of Rituximab and original trade name of Rituxan
- َAryoTrust with the generic name of trastuzumab and original name of Herceptin
- Stivant with the generic name of bevacizumab and original trade name of Avestin

AryoSeven is now approved by Iranian food and drug organisation and from August 2012 is in the market.

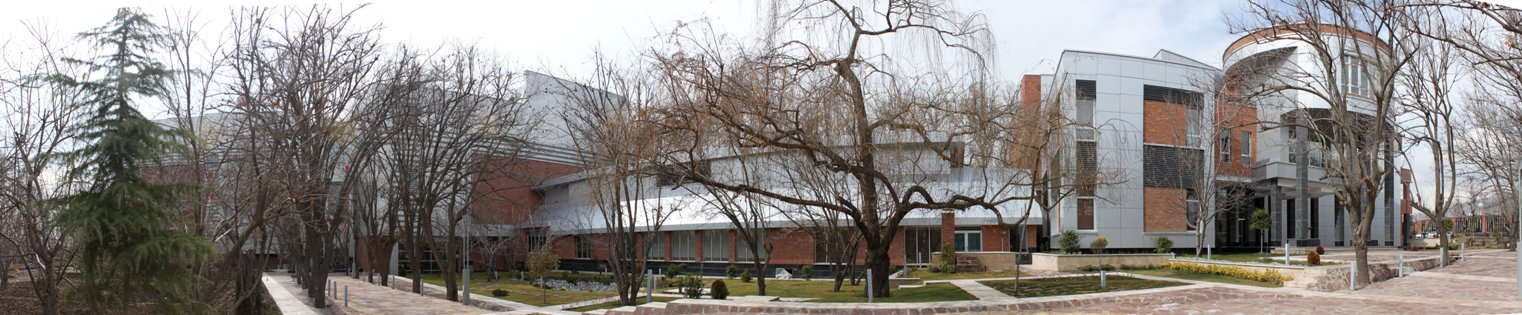
AryoGen Pharmed Complex.

== See also ==
- Healthcare in Iran
