= National Research Institute for Science Policy =

Iranian research institute

National Research Institute for Science Policy (NRISP) is an Iranian organisation established in 1980 to act as a research institute and think tank for the Ministry of Science, Research and Technology.

== Publications ==
NRISP publishes four periodicals:

- Journal of Science and Technology Policy (Quarterly) ISSN 2008-0840
- Rahyāft (Science Policy Quarterly) ISSN 1027-2690
- Daneshgar (Scientific Journal-Monthly)
- Science and Research Newsletter

== Departments ==
NRISP consists of six departments:

- Futures studies research department,
- Economy of science research department,
- Public understanding of science research department,
- Scientometrics department,
- Science and society research department, and
- Science policy research department.

== See also ==
- International rankings of Iran
- Science and technology in Iran
