= Ahmad-Reza Dehpour =

Iranian pharmacologist and biomedical scientist

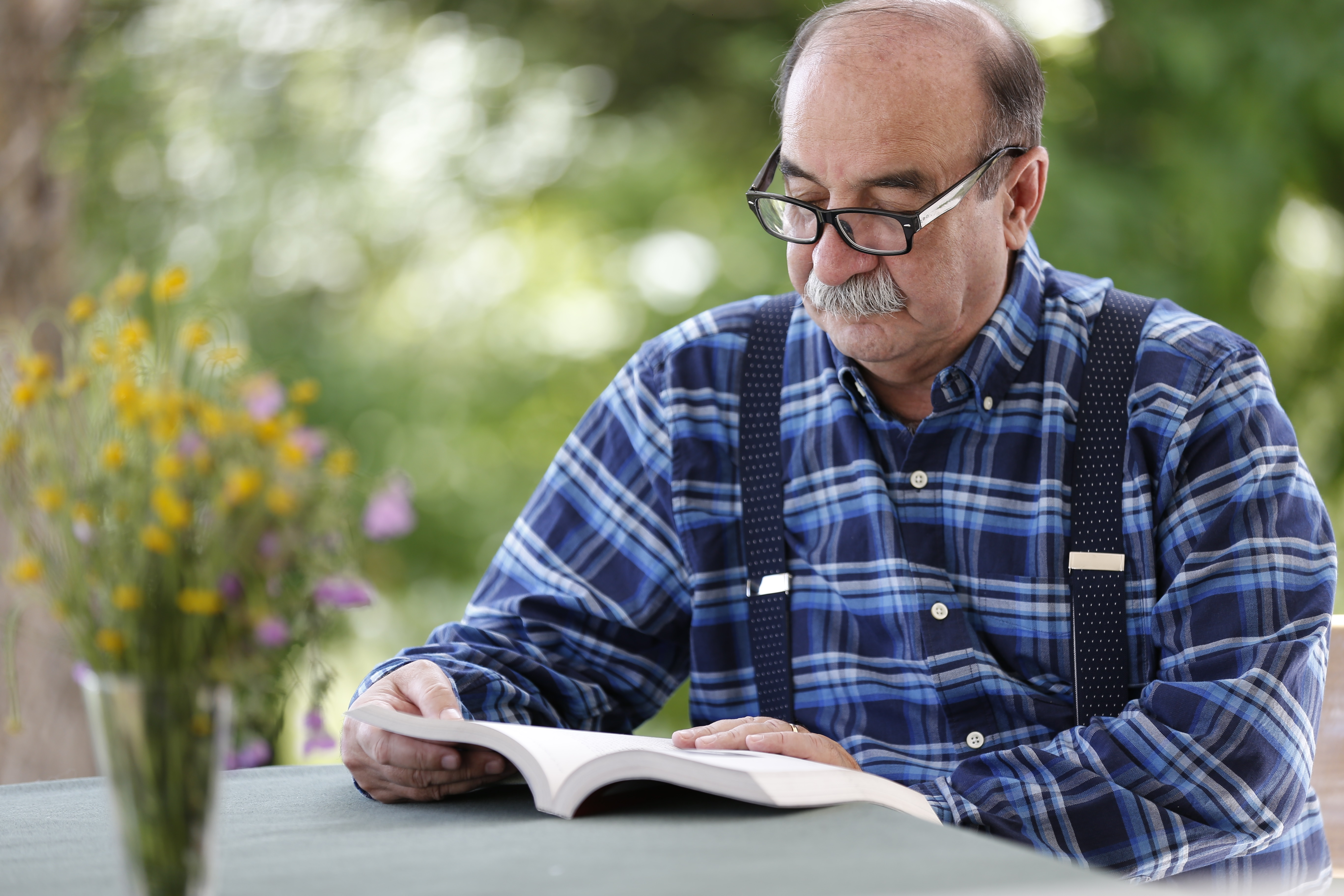
- Born: 19 August 1948 (age 78); Siahkal, Gilan province, North of Iran
- Education: Moshir and Farhang Elementary School; Ferdowsi High School; Tehran University (Pharm.D.); Medical School of Tehran University (Ph.D.)
- Known for: Signal Transduction Pathway
- Scientific career
- Fields: Pharmacology
- Workplaces: Experimental Medicine Research Center
- Thesis: "Some Biophysical and Biochemical; Aspects of Blood Cell Membranes"

Ahmad-Reza Dehpour is an Iranian pharmacologist and biomedical scientist, among the top 1% in the world, and the world's highly cited researchers announced by Thomson Reuters ISI. He is currently a distinguished professor of pharmacology at the School of Medicine, Tehran University of Medical Sciences (TUMS). He is also the director of the Experimental Medicine Research Center He is also a member of the Neuroscience Committee of National Institute for Medical Research Development of Iran(NIMAD).

== Early life and education ==
Ahmad-Reza Dehpour was born in Siahkal, Gilan province, northern Iran, in 1948. He attended Moshir and Farhang elementary school. He received his diploma in Natural Sciences from Ferdowsi high school in Bandar-e Anzali, Gilan province. He was granted admission from the most prestigious university of Iran, and earned his doctorate in pharmacy (Pharm.D.) from Tehran University in 1972. After graduation, he served his military services in the Khark Island Naval base for two years. After his time in the Navy, he continued to pursue further research and education in his field of passion. He earned a Ph.D. in pharmacology from the Tehran University under the supervision of Professor Frank Michal—a guest professor from Cambridge University living in Iran at that time. His thesis title was "Some Biophysical and Biochemical; Aspects of Blood Cell Membranes."

== Career ==
He began his academic career by joining Tehran University of Medical Sciences as an assistant professor of pharmacology in 1978. He was promoted to an associate professor of pharmacology in 1983 and consequently to a professor of pharmacology in 1993 and was awarded distinguished professorship in 2011. He has devoted himself to teach fundamental concepts in pharmacology to undergraduate and graduate students, also serving as an undergraduate and graduate research mentor/advisor. Additionally, He spent a study opportunity course in the Swiss Federal Institute of Technology (ETH) Zurich from 1998 to 1999.

In addition to his academic contribution, he was the General Secretary of the Iranian Society of Physiology and Pharmacology from 1981 to 1986. He became a member of the Iranian Board of Pharmacology form 1999 and a Continuous membership of the Iranian Academy of Medical Sciences since 2007. Dehpour was the President of the Iranian Society of Physiology & Pharmacology from 2005 to 2007. He is also an adjunct professor at the Institute of Biochemistry and Biophysics (IBB), University of Tehran.. and the director of drug discovery and evaluation committee in the National Institute for Medical Research Development.

Following his executive roles, he is the founder and director of the Experimental Medicine Research Center in Tehran University of Medical Sciences. He has supervised more than 50 Ph.D. thesis, a plentiful of undergraduate students thesis; also, he has published more than 930 original research papers in the world's prestigious journals. He has made significant contributions to many research projects in collaboration with well-known universities and hospital research institutes around the world, such as University College London (UCL), University of Calgary, Harvard Medical School, Royal Free Hospital, Massachusetts General Hospital (MGH) and University of Massachusetts (UMass) Hospital.

Beyond his scientific research, Dehpour is the editor-in-chief of the "Acta Medica Iranica" journal, published by Tehran University of Medical Sciences. He is also a member of the editorial board in "Liver International," "World Journal of Gastrointestinal Pharmacology and Therapeutics," "World Journal of Clinical Urology," "World Journal of Pharmacology" and "Journal of Family and Reproductive Health." In addition, he recurrently acts as a reviewer/editor for various scientific journals, upon request.

== Honors and awards ==
- Selected scientist of the recent decade in the field of medical sciences and winner of the award of Dr. Fereidoun Azizi at the Academy of Medical Sciences, Tehran, Iran, 2021.
- Best Investigator award, Basic Sciences branch, 23rd Razi National Medical Research Festival, Ministry of Health and Medical Education, Tehran, Iran, 2018.
- One of the world's highly cited researchers by Thomson Reuters ISI, 2015.
- Best national researcher award, 16th Abu Reyhan Biruni Research Festival, 2015.
- First rank in Education, 17th Avecina Festival, TUMS, 2015.
- Medal of Honor "International Prof. Yalda Academic Foundation in Medical Sciences," in 2012.
- Tehran University of Medical Sciences (TUMS) distinguished professorship, 2011.
- One of the top 1% scientists in the world by Thomson Reuters ISI, 2009.
- Eminent Researcher: Research Festival of University of Tehran, 2008.
- Best Investigator award, Pharmaceutical Sciences Branch, 12th Razi National Medical Research Festival, Ministry of Health and Medical Education, Tehran, Iran, 2006.
- First rank in Research and Best Researcher Award, 7th Avicena Festival, TUMS, 2005.
- Best national researcher award, Ministry of Health and Medical Education, 2003.
- Best national researcher award, Ministry of Health and Medical Education, 2001.
- First rank in Education, 1st Avecina Festival, TUMS Publications (Full Papers), 1999.
