= List of University of Tehran people =

Here is a list of notable people affiliated with the University of Tehran and Tehran University of Medical Sciences, commonly including alumni, chancellors, current and former faculty members, students, and others.

== Academics ==
- Mostafa Azkia, University of Tehran professor of sociology
- Bahram Beyzai, playwright and filmmaker
- Hossein Bashiriyeh, political scientist, visiting professor at Syracuse University
- Mohammad Bagher Ghalibaf, professor of political geography, Mayor of Tehran
- Mehdi Bazargan, head of the engineering department, former Prime Minister
- Hossein Gol-e-Golab, professor
- Mahmoud Hessaby, professor of physics
- Jalal Jalalizadeh, professor of theology and law
- Parviz Jabehdar Maralani, professor of electrical engineering
- Noureddin Kianouri, architect and political leader
- Caro Lucas, Intelligent Control professor
- Abbas Milani, professor, research fellow at the Hoover Institution and Director of Iranian Studies at Stanford University
- Mostafa Moeen, director of the Immunology, Asthma and Allergy Research Institute
- Jamshid Momtaz, professor of law
- Mohammad Mosaddegh, taught in law faculty, former Prime Minister of Iran
- Hossein Nasr, philosopher, Dean of Faculty, and Academic Vice-Chancellor of the university from 1968 to 1972
- Malcolm Nokes MC, nuclear scientist, Institute of Nuclear Science, 1966–69
- Ali Ardashir Larijani, professor of philosophy
- Mohsen Vaziri-Moghaddam, professor of art
- Gholam-Reza Pourmand, professor of urology
- Sayed Ebrahim Dibaj, professor of philosophy
- Mohammad Ali Sahraian, neurologist and researcher
- Mohammad-Nabi Sarbolouki, professor of biophysics
- Hamid Soltanian-Zadeh, professor of electrical engineering
- Assad Sheikholeslami Sanandaji, theologian and professor at Tehran University
- Mohammad Jalal Abbasi-Shavazi, professor of demography
- Ahmad Kamyabi Mask, professor of theater
- Ali Akbar Velayati, professor of medicine
- Siamak Yassemi, Member of The World Academy of Science(TWAS)
- Syed Rahim Moshiri, professor of human geography and physical geography
- Abdul Hamid Zangeneh, professor, dean of the law faculty

== Administrative ==
=== College founders ===
- Dr. Mahmoud Hesābi, founder

=== Chancellors ===
1. Dr. Ali-Asghar Hekmat (1934–38)
2. Dr. Esmāil Merāt (1938–40)
3. Dr. Isā Sedigh Sedigh Alam (1940)
4. Dr. Mohammad Tadayyon (1940–41)
5. Dr. Mostafā Adl Mansour os-Saltaneh (1941–42)
6. Dr. Ali-Akbar Siāsi (1942–54)
7. Dr. Manouchehr Eghbāl (1954–57)
8. Dr. Ahmad Farhād Motamed (fa) (1957–63)
9. Dr. Jahānshāh Sāleh (fa) (1963–68)
10. Dr. Fazlollāh Rezā (1968–69)
11. Dr. Alinaghi Alikhani (1969–71)
12. Dr. Houshang Nahāvandi (1971–76)
13. Dr. Ahmad Houshang Sharifi (1976–77)
14. Dr. Ghāsem Motamedi (fa) (1977–78)
15. Dr. Abdollāh Sheibāni (fa) (1978–79)
16. Dr. Mohammad Maleki (1979)
17. Dr. Hassan Ārefi (fa) (1980–81)
18. Dr. Ali Mehdizādeh Shahri (fa) (1981)
19. Dr. Abolghāsem Gorji (fa) (1981–82)
20. Dr. Dr. Abbās Sheibāni (1982–83)
21. Dr. Bahman Yazdi Samadi (fa) (1983–85)
22. Dr. Mohammad Farhādi (1985)
23. Esmāil Evini (fa) (1985)
24. Dr. Hossein Foroutan (fa) (1985–88)
25. Dr. Mohammad Rahimiān (fa) (1989–93)
26. Dr. Gholām-Ali Afrouz (fa) (1993–94)
27. Dr. Mohammad-Rezā Āref (1994–97)
28. Dr. Mansour Khalili Erāghi (fa) (1997–2002)
29. Dr. Rezā Faraji-Dānā (2002–05)
30. Abbās-Ali Amid Zanjāni (2005–07)
31. Dr. Farhad Rahbar (2007–14)
32. Dr. Mahmoud Nili Ahmadābādi (2014–21)

== Alumni ==
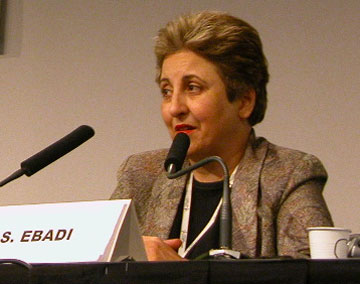
Shirin Ebadi, Nobel Laureate

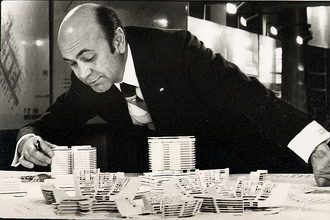
Heydar Ghiaï, architect

=== Nobel laureates ===
- Shirin Ebadi and faculty member [Nobel Peace Prize 2003].

=== Scientists and technology ===
- Seyed Kazem Alavipanah, professor of Remote Sensing
- Lotfi A. Zadeh, inventor of fuzzy logic
- Moslem Bahadori, physician and university lecturer
- Caucher Birkar mathematician
- Ahmad Reza Dehpour, professor
- Nader Engheta, inventor of Plasmonic cover
- Hassan Farsam, university lecturer
- Mehdi Ghalibafian, civil engineer
- Hossein Gol-e-Golab, professor
- Mehdi Golshani, university lecturer
- Hamid Jafarkhani, University lecturer
- Ali Javan, inventor of gas laser
- Kourosh Kalantar-zadeh, professor of engineering and inventor
- Kamaloddin Jenab, physics pioneering faculty
- Caro Lucas, Intelligent Control professor
- Iraj Ershaghi, petroleum engineer
- Alireza Mashaghi, scientist and physician
- Mohammad Ali Mojtahedi, engineer, school and university administrator
- Toffy Musivand, inventor of artificial cardiac pump
- Kaveh Pahlavan, wireless networking researcher
- Samuel Rahbar, discovered HbA1C
- Yahya Rahmat-Samii, Member of the National Academy of Engineering, USA.
- Alireza Rastegar, inventor, president of the international federation of inventors' associations, winner of ISESCO technology prize in 2003
- Yousef Sobouti, founder of IASBS
- Saeed Sohrabpour, president of the Sharif University of Technology

=== Intellectuals, scholars, and philosophers ===
- Jalal Al-e-Ahmad, intellectual
- William Chittick, scholar
- Elahi Qomshe'i, philosopher and university lecturer
- Dariush Shayegan, philosopher
- Abdolkarim Soroush, philosopher
- Javad Tabatabai, political philosopher
- Parviz Varjavand professor of archeology

=== Architects ===
- Foad Rafii, architect
- Hooshang Seyhoon, architect, Dean of College of Fine Arts

=== Artists and musicians ===
- Mehrdad Afsari, photographer
- Hossein Alizadeh, musician and university lecturer
- Morteza Avini, photographer
- Rakhshan Bani-E'temad, filmmaker
- Asghar Farhadi, director
- Mansooreh Hosseini, artist
- Haleh Jamali, Iranian artist
- Arghavan Khosravi, Iranian painter and sculptor
- Abbas Kiarostami, filmmaker
- Janet Mikhaili (Faculty of Fine Arts), illustrator
- Noreen Motamed, painter
- Behjat Sadr, artist
- Amir Reza Salari, cinematographer and director
- Khosrow Shakibai, actor
- Mohsen Vaziri-Moghaddam, professor of art

=== Athletes ===
- Mojtaba Abedini (born 1984), Olympic fencer
- Janet Kohan-Sedq, athlete

=== Linguists and literary figures ===
- Hossein Towfigh, editor-in-chief, Towfigh Magazine
- Fereshteh Ahmadi, writer
- Pegah Ahmadi, poet and literary critic
- Amir-Hossein Aryanpour, dictionarist and translator
- Mohammad-Taqi Bahar, poet, journalist, professor of Persian literature
- Mohammad Ali Eslami Nodooshan, author
- Adib Boroumand, poet, politician and researcher
- Badiozzaman Forouzanfar, linguist
- Hossein Hafezian, political scientist and author
- Razi Hirmandi, translator and writer
- Siavash Kasraie, poet
- Shahriar Mandanipour, author
- Dr. Seyed Ali Mirlohi Falavarjani, Retired Arabic Literature Professor from University of Isfahan, Founder of Islamic Azad University of Falavarjanin 1984
- Mohammad Moin, linguist and university lecturer
- Fereydoun Motamed, linguist
- Ahmad NikTalab, Iranian poet, author, and linguistic
- Ramak NikTalab, Iranian author and translator
- Shahrnush Parsipur, novelist
- Ehsan Yarshater, Iranologist
- Abdolhossein Zarinkoob, Iranologist

=== Politicians ===
- Seyyed Mohammad Ali Abtahi, former Vice President
- Abbas Amir-Entezam, former Deputy Prime Minister
- Jamshid Amuzegar, Prime Minister
- Mohammad Reza Aref, former Vice President
- Mohammad Beheshti, Ayatollah
- Habibolah Bitaraf, cabinet minister
- Mostafa Chamran, former vice president and Minister of Defense
- Rahman Dadman, cabinet minister
- Abbas Ahmad Akhondi, current professor, current cabinet minister
- Manuchehr Eghbal, Prime Minister
- Adib Boroumand, leader of National Front
- Hossein Fatemi, former Minister of Foreign Affairs
- Gholam Ali Haddad-Adel, former chairman of the Iranian Parliament
- Fatemeh Haghighatjou, former MP
- Saeed Hajjarian, former presidential advisor and reformist
- Mustafa Hijri, leader of Democratic Party of Iranian Kurdistan
- Mohammed Ali Jafari, IRGC Chief Commander
- Jalal Jalalizadeh, former MP
- Mehdi Karroubi, reformist politician and chairman of National Trust Party
- Kamal Kharrazi, cabinet minister, former Minister of Foreign Affairs
- Mohammad Khatami, former President of Iran
- Mohammad Reza Khatami, former secretary-general of the Islamic Iran Participation Front
- Ahmad Khorram, cabinet minister
- Elaheh Koulaei, current professor, former Member of Parliament
- Ali Larijani, speaker of Parliament and former president of IRIB
- Alireza Marandi academic, current Member of Parliament
- Hassan Ali Mansur, Prime Minister
- Mohsen Mirdamadi, Secretary-General of the Islamic Iran Participation Front
- Gholam-Hossein Mohseni-Eje'i, former head of the Ministry of Intelligence and attorney-general
- Heydar Moslehi, current head of Ministry of Intelligence
- Manuchehr Mottaki, former Minister of Foreign Affairs
- Mir-Hossein Mousavi, Prime Minister
- Bijan Namdar Zangeneh, cabinet minister
- Mohsen Nourbakhsh, former Governor of the Central Bank, cabinet minister, former Member of Parliament
- Zahra Rahnavard, politician and artist
- Massoud Rajavi, leader of PMOI
- Abdollah Ramezanzadeh, current professor, spokesman for Khatami's administration
- Mohsen Rezaee, current secretary of the Expediency Council, former IRGC Chief Commander
- Ezzatollah Sahabi, politician
- Yadollah Sahabi, politician
- Kazem Sami, former Minister of Health
- Jafar Sharif-Emami, former Prime Minister of Iran
- Ebrahim Sheibani, Iranian Ambassador, former Governor of the Central Bank
- Mostafa Tajzadeh, former vice minister
- Marzieh Vahid-Dastjerdi, Minister of Health and Medical Education
- Parviz Varjavand, former Minister of Culture
- Ali Akbar Velayati, cabinet minister, former Minister of Foreign Affairs
- Ebrahim Yazdi, former Deputy Prime Minister, Secretary-General of the Freedom Movement of Iran
- Javad Zarif, former ambassador to the United Nations

=== Others ===
- Ahmad Batebi, human rights activist
- Amir Farshad Ebrahimi, human rights activist
- Adel Ferdosipour, journalist, football commentator, television show host, and university professor
- Heydar Ghiai, architect, professor of architecture
- Saeed Hajjarian, journalist
- Darya Safai, women's rights activist
- Mahlagha Mallah, environmental activist
- Nasser Moghadam, former head of SAVAK
- Akbar Mohammadi, student protester
- Younan Nowzaradan, surgeon, TV personality, and author
- Fazrollah Reza, professor
- Kasra Nouri, lawyer
- Sayed Khatiboleslam Sadrnezhaad, professor of metallurgy at MIT
- Mehdi Sadaghdar, YouTube comedian, electrical engineer
- Ahmad Zeidabadi, journalist
- Saeid Akbari, sports journalist

== See also ==
- Higher education in Iran
- Tehran University
- List of Iranian scholars
