= Moshiri =

Moshiri is a surname. Notable people with the surname include:

- Farhad Moshiri (born 1955), a British-Iranian businessman
- Farhad Moshiri (artist) (born 1963), an Iranian artist
- Farnoosh Moshiri, an Iranian novelist, playwright, and librettist
- Fereydoon Moshiri (1926–2000), an Iranian poet
- Mahshid Moshiri, an Iranian novelist and lexicographer.
- Maryam Moshiri, a British television broadcaster
- Minoo Moshiri, an Iranian essayist, literary translator, film-critic and journalist
- Saeed Moshiri (born 1957), an Iranian economist
- Syed Rahim Moshiri (born 1930), an Iranian geographer

== See also ==
- Moshiri Station, a train station in Japan
