= Acmon (father of Uranus) =

Greek mythological figure

In Greek mythology, Acmon (Ancient Greek: Ἄκμων) is in some sources the father of Uranus, the personification of the sky, with no mother mentioned. A fragment of Alcman is the first attestation of this parentage, and fragments of several later authors refer to Uranus as Akmonídēs ('son of Acmon'). In another genealogy, incorrectly attributed to Hesiod, Acmon is the son of Gaia, and in some sources he is identified with Uranus himself.

One scholar believes that Acmon featured in the early theogony, and another holds that he may have been the same as a different father of Uranus mentioned in an early epic poem. Acmon's name is Proto-Indo-European in origin, and several etymological explanations of his role as Uranus's father are given by ancient authors.

== Etymology ==
In Ancient Greek, the word ákmōn (ἄκμων) means 'anvil' or 'meteoric stone'. It derives from the Proto-Indo-European *h₂eḱ-mon- ('stone, heaven'), and is cognate with the Sanskrit áśman-, Avestan asman-, Old Persian asman-, and Lithuanian akmuō. An ancient derivation of ákmōn from akámatos (ἀκάματος, 'unwearying') is mentioned by the 12th-century AD Byzantine writer Eustathius, in his commentary on the Iliad: Acmon's place as the father of Uranus is explained by the heavens' propensity to be "unwearying" in their motion. (Note: Hard, p. 32; Eustathius, on Iliad 18.476 (van der Valk, p. 218).) According to the 1st-century AD philosopher Cornutus, "some of the poets" attribute the genealogy to the heavens' inability to be destroyed or exhausted. (Note: Edmonds, p. 225; Cornutus, Theologiae Graecae compendium 1.11 (Torres, p. 1).)

== Father of Uranus ==
Acmon is described by multiple ancient authors as the father of Uranus, the personification of the sky, who in other sources is the offspring of Gaia, Aether, or Nyx; this genealogy places Acmon among the earliest deities. In sources which mention this parentage, no mother is given. The earliest attestation of this genealogy is a fragment of the 7th-century BC poet Alcman, transmitted by Eustathius. (Note: Davies, p. 14 (genealogy); Matthews, p. 180 (earliest attestation); PMG 61 (Page, p. 53) [= Eustathius, on Iliad 18.476 (van der Valk, p. 218)].) As preserved in fragments, the patronymic Akmonídēs (Ἀκμονίδης, 'son of Acmon') was used by the poet Antimachus (writing in the early 4th century BC), and later by Callimachus, and Simmias of Rhodes, to refer to Uranus. (Note: Faber 2012, pp. 419–420 with n. 25; Antimachus, fr. 51 Matthews (p. 178); Callimachus, fr. 498 Pfeiffer (p. 368); Simmias of Rhodes, Wings fr. 24 Powell (p. 116).) According to a scholium (a marginal note in the manuscript of a text) on the fragment of Simmias, Acmon was the offspring of Gaia and the father of Uranus in a poem by Hesiod; (Note: Hoefer, para. 1; Scholia on Simmias of Rhodes, Wings 1 (Faber 2017, p. 446). A scholium on another fragment of Callimachus repeats the genealogy that Uranus is Acmon's son (Faber 2017, p. 446).) this ascription, however, is erroneous. (Note: Whitman, p. 40; Faber 2017, p. 445. Gantz, p. 12 writes that the attribution to Hesiod is "probably a mistake based on manuscript corruption".)

Fritz Graf believes that Acmon appeared as Uranus's parent in an early theogony, (Note: Graf, para. 1. Similarly, Whitman, p. 40 writes that Acmon was present in a theogony.) and Miles Beckwith describes him as "apparently an ancient sky god". According to Robin Hard, his name may initially have been an epiclesis of Uranus (that is, an epithet used in cult). (Note: Hard, p. 32. Hard compares this to how Helios sometimes bears the epithet "Hyperion", at times the name of his father.) In the Titanomachy, a lost epic poem which dates to the late 7th century BC or afterwards, Uranus's father was Aether, who Victor J. Matthews believes might here have been the same as Acmon. (Note: Matthews, p. 180; Titanomachy frr. 1^{A}, 1^{B} Tsagalis (p. 18). For further discussion of this fragment, and how it may relate to Acmon and an early belief that the sky was composed of stone, see Davies, p. 14.) According to Christos Tsagalis, an identification of Acmon and a "fiery" Aether may have been linked to the Idaean Dactyl named Acmon. (Note: Tsagalis, p. 51. Tsagalis writes that the poet of the Titanomachy may have chosen to place Aether as Uranus's father over Acmon as way of emphasising Uranus's "fiery" aspect.)

While Acmon is usually described as Uranus's father, he is identified by some ancient authors with Uranus himself: one passage of Eustathius's commentary states that Acmon is the name of the father of Cronus (who was usually the son of Uranus), and the lexicon by the 5th- or 6th-century AD grammarian Hesychius gives ouranós (οὐρανός) as one gloss of ákmōn. (Note: Eustathius, on the Iliad 18.410 (van der Valk, p. 206); Hesychius, s.v. ἄκμων (Cunningham, p. 116). For Cronus as the son of Uranus, see Grimal, s.v. Cronus, p. 115.) Hesychius also seems to refer to Acmon as the father of Charon, the ferryman of the underworld, though it is uncertain whether this genealogy appeared in Hesychius's original text, owing to the possibility of textual corruption. (Note: Sourvinou-Inwood, p. 308 n. 28; Hesychius, s.v. Ἀκμονίδης (Cunningham, p. 116).)
