= M. Rahim Shayegan =

Iranian-born American ancient historian, Iranologist

- رحیم شایگان
- Born: Pahlavi Iran
- Other name: Rahim Shayegan
- Education: University of Cologne, University of Paris, University of Göttingen, Harvard University (PhD)
- Occupations: Historian, scholar, educator
- Employer: University of California, Los Angeles
- Known for: Iranian studies
- Notable work: Arsacids and Sasanians: Political Ideology in Post-Hellenistic and Late Antique Persia (2011)
- Father: Dariush Shayegan (father)
- Awards: Guggenheim Fellowship

M. Rahim Shayegan (/ʃɑːjɛɡɑːn/, Persian: رحیم شایگان, romanized: M. Raḥīm Šāygān) is an Iranian-American historian of the ancient world. He is Professor of Iranian and the Ancient Near East and the Eleanor and Jahangir Amuzegar Chair in the Department of Near Eastern Languages and Cultures at the University of California, Los Angeles (UCLA).

At UCLA, he also serves as the founding director of the Pourdavoud Institute for the Study of the Iranian World, the founding director of the Yarshater Center for the Study of Iranian Literary Traditions, as well as the founding director and chair of the governance board of the Jeffrey P. Cunard Center for Global Antiquity, an academic unit of the Division of Humanities.

== Biography ==
Shayegan is the son of the late academic Dariush Shayegan.

Shayegan received his B.A. from the University of Cologne, Germany, and his M.A. from the University of Sorbonne (now University of Paris), France. He did graduate work at the University of Göttingen, Germany, and received his Ph.D. from Harvard University. He was a Junior Fellow at the Harvard Society of Fellows, before joining the faculty at UCLA. He is a foreign corresponding member of the Austrian Academy of Sciences (2022), a fellow of the Academia Europaea (2019), and a Guggenheim fellow (2013).

Shayegan's research focuses on Old Iranian philology and epigraphy, religion, and the history of ancient Iran, primarily the history of the Achaemenid, Arsacid, Seleucid, and Sasanian periods.

== Writing ==
Shayegan’s scholarly work spans a broad array of subjects, historical periods, and linguistic traditions. Central to his academic inquiry are the dynamics of cultural and intellectual exchange between the Mediterranean world and the regions of West and Central Asia. This comparative perspective underpins his investigations into the linguistically diverse empires of antiquity, whose political, ideological, and religious frameworks emerged through intricate processes of cultural transmission and acculturation.

Shayegan's most quoted and authoritative book Arsacids and Sasanians: Political Ideology in Post-Hellenistic and Late Antique Persia (2011) is a study of written, numismatic, and archeological sources to reassess Sasanian political ideology and its foundation in Achaemenid Persian imperial thought, Babylonian scholarship and prophetic traditions, as well as Hellenistic Greek philosophy. It discusses the political intricacies of early Arsacid and Sasanian history—particularly in relation to Babylon and Elymais—and analyzes the impact of Roman propaganda that shaped Roman attitudes toward Sasanian Persia. The book has been widely reviewed by Classicists and Iranists alike.

Other published books include Aspects of History and Epic in Ancient Iran (Harvard University Press, 2012) and Cyrus the Great: Life and Lore (Harvard University Press, 2019). His forthcoming books are Achéménides et Sassanides : Continuités et ruptures et transformations, the revised version of his five lectures at INALCO/Collège de France in 2022, and Entangled Worlds: Ancient Iran and the Classical Mediterranean (Los Angeles: Getty Research Institute, 2027).

Shayegan is the editor of the series Iran and the Ancient World with University of California Press. He is editor and publisher of the Bulletin of the Asia Institute, originally established in 1931 by Arthur Upham Pope.

== Publications ==
- Bakhos, Carol; Shayegan, M. Rahim, eds. (2010). The Talmud in Its Iranian Context. Tübingen: Mohr Siebeck. ISBN 978-3-161-50187-6.
- Shayegan, M. Rahim (2011). Arsacids and Sasanians: Political Ideology in Post-Hellenistic and Late Antique Persia. Cambridge: Cambridge University Press. ISBN 978-0-521-76641-8 – via Google Books.
- Shayegan, M. Rahim (2012). Aspects of History and Epic in Ancient Iran: From Gaumāta to Wahnām. Hellenic Studies. Vol. 52. Cambridge, MA: Center for Hellenic Studies, Trustees for Harvard University. ISBN 978-0-674-06588-8 – via the Center for Hellenic Studies.
- Shayegan, M. Rahim (2013). "Sasanian Political Ideology". In Potts, Daniel T. (ed.). The Oxford Handbook of Ancient Iran. Oxford and New York City: Oxford University Press. pp. 805–813. doi:10.1093/oxfordhb/9780199733309.001.0001. ISBN 978-0-19-973330-9 – via the Internet Archive.
- Shayegan, M. Rahim (2017). "Persianism: Or Achaemenid Reminiscences in the Iranian and Iranicate World(s) of Antiquity". In Strootman, Rolf; Versluys, Miguel John (eds.). Persianism in Antiquity. Oriens et Occidens. Vol. 25. Stuttgart: Franz Steiner Verlag. pp. 401–457. ISBN 978-3-515-11382-3 – via Academia.edu.
- Shayegan, M. Rahim, ed. (2019). Cyrus the Great: Life and Lore. Vol. 21. Washington, D.C. and Cambridge, MA: Ilex Foundation - Center for Hellenic Studies, Trustees for Harvard University. ISBN 978-0-674-98738-8.
- Shayegan, M. Rahim (2022). "The End of the Parthian Arsacid Empire". In Gehler, Michael; Rollinger, Robert; Strobl, Philipp (eds.). The End of Empires. Universal- und kulturhistorische Studien / Studies in Universal and Cultural History. Wiesbaden: Springer Fachmedien. pp. 213–247. doi:10.1007/978-3-658-36876-0_9. ISBN 978-3-658-36876-0.
- Shayegan, M. Rahim, ed. (2027). Entangled Worlds: Ancient Iran and the Classical Mediterranean. Los Angeles: Getty Research Institute. ISBN 979-8-88712-044-7.
