= Charon =

Ferryman of Hades in Greek mythology

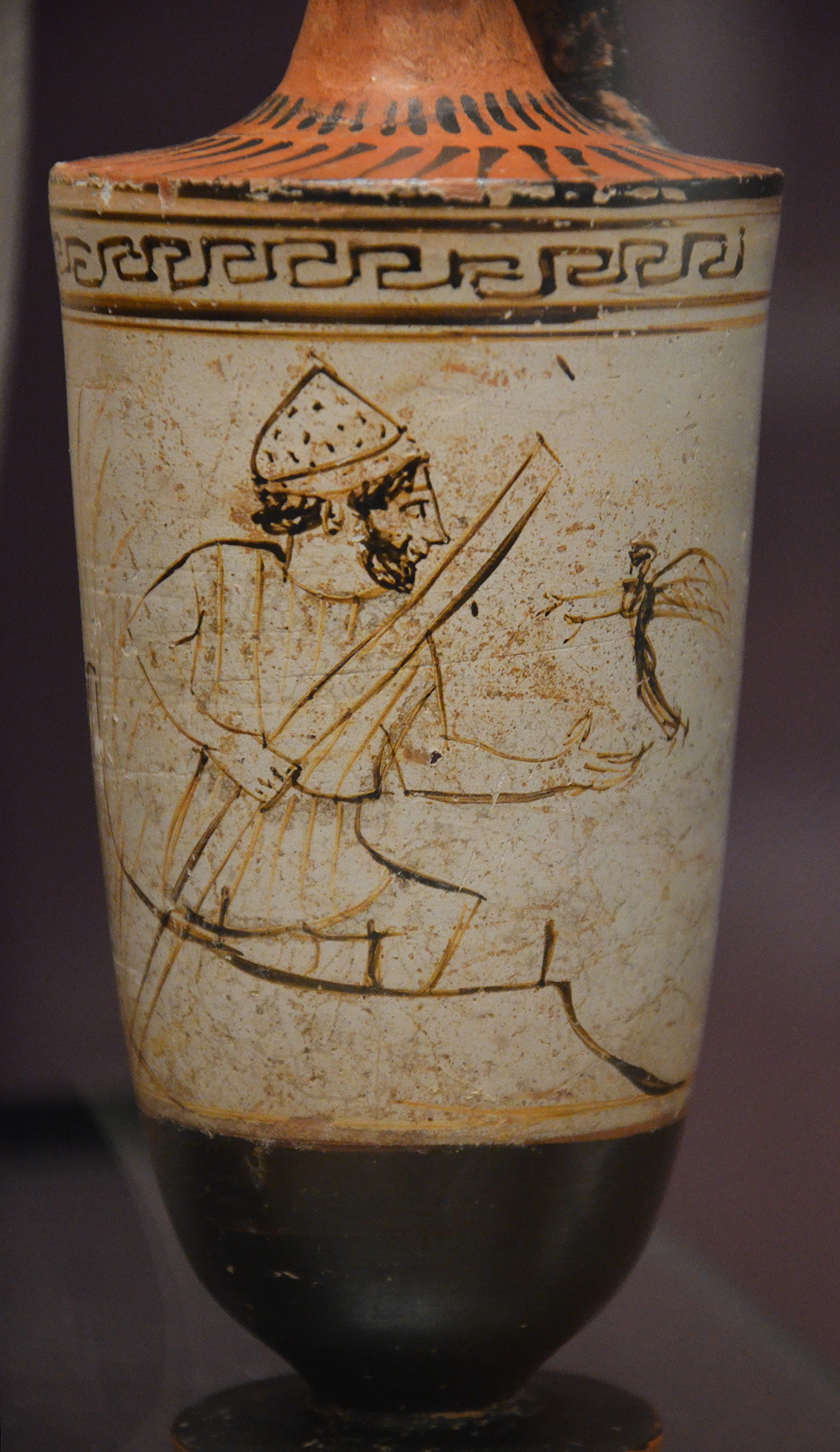
Attic red-figure lekythos attributed to the Tymbos painter showing Charon welcoming a soul into his boat, c. 500–450 BC

In Greek mythology, Charon or Kharon (/ˈkɛərɒn, -ən/ KAIR-on, -ən; Ancient Greek: Χάρων Ancient Greek pronunciation: [kʰá.rɔːn]) is the ferryman of the Greek underworld. He transports the souls of those who have been given funeral rites across the river (often called Acheron or Styx) that borders the underworld. Archaeology confirms that, in some burials, low-value coins known generically as Charon's obols were placed in, on, or near the mouth of the deceased, or next to the cremation urn containing the ashes. In Virgil's epic poem, Aeneid, the dead who could not pay the fee, and those who had received no funeral rites, had to wander the near shores of the Styx for one hundred years before they were allowed to cross the river. Charon also ferried the living mortals Heracles and Aeneas to the underworld and back again.

== Etymology ==
The name Charon is unexplained except via folk etymology which takes it as a proper noun from χάρων (charon), a poetic form of χαρωπός (charopós) 'flashing, amber-eyed'. The word may be a euphemism for death or a reference to his fiery eyes. Flashing eyes may indicate the anger or irascibility of Charon as he is often characterized in literature. The ancient historian Diodorus Siculus thought that the ferryman and his name had been imported from Egypt. Charon is first attested in the now fragmentary Greek epic poem Minyas, which includes a description of a descent to the underworld and possibly dates back to the 6th century BC.

== Genealogy ==
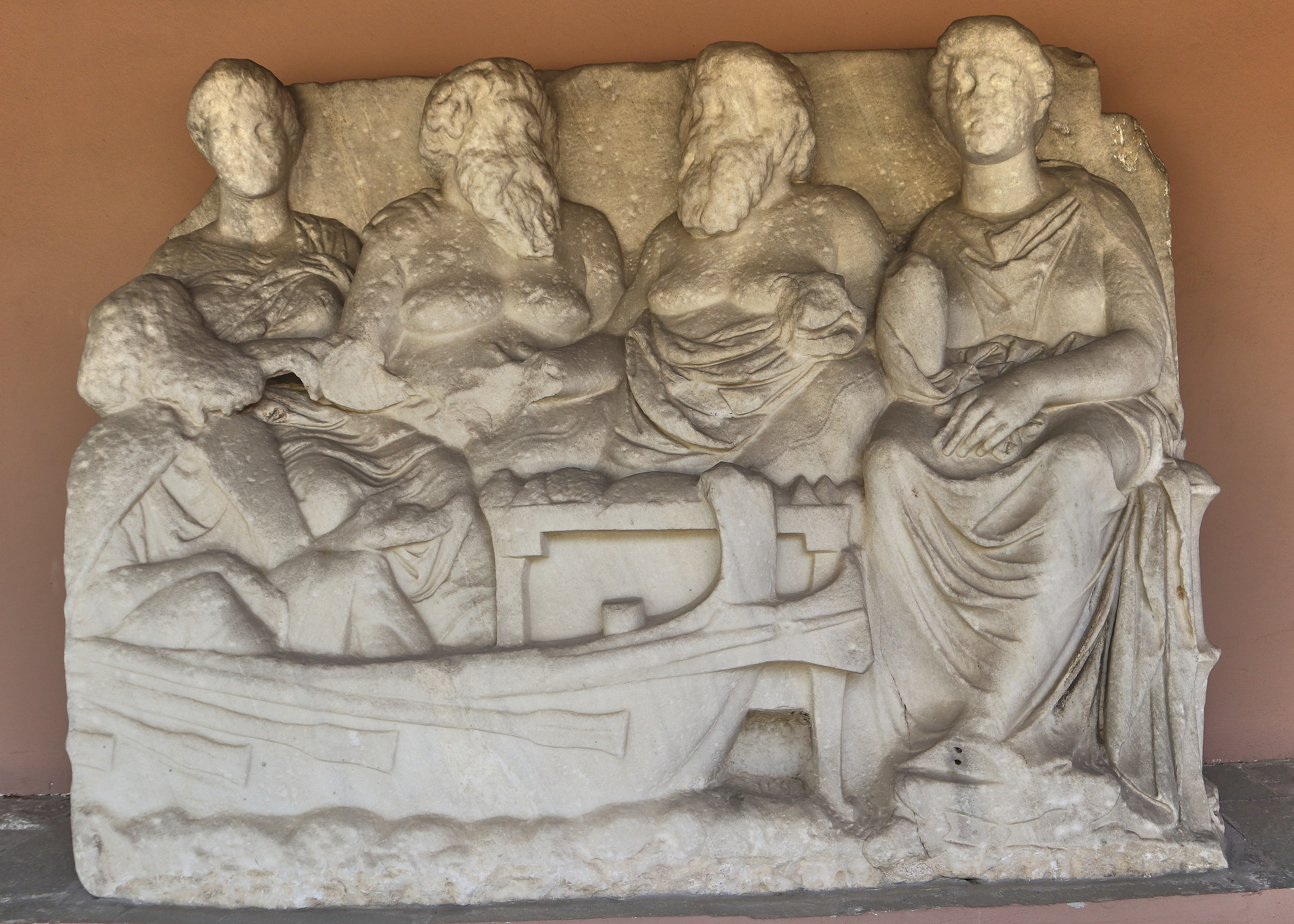
Charon and his boat on a funerary relief, ca 320s BC, KAMA.

No ancient source provides a genealogy for Charon, except for one reference making him a son of Acmon, found in the entry "Akmonides" in the lexicon of Hesychius, which is dubious and the text may be corrupt. Neither Pauly-Wissowa nor Daremberg and Saglio offer a genealogy for Charon.

In Genealogia Deorum Gentilium, the Italian Renaissance writer Giovanni Boccaccio wrote that Charon, whom he identified as the god of time, was a son of Erebus and Night. The idea appears to have originated from the similarity between the names "Charon" and "Chronos" (a connection already made by earlier writers such as Fulgentius), the fact that both are said to be very old, and that the god of old age is said to be the child of Erebus and Night according to Cicero's De natura deorum.

== Appearance and demeanor ==
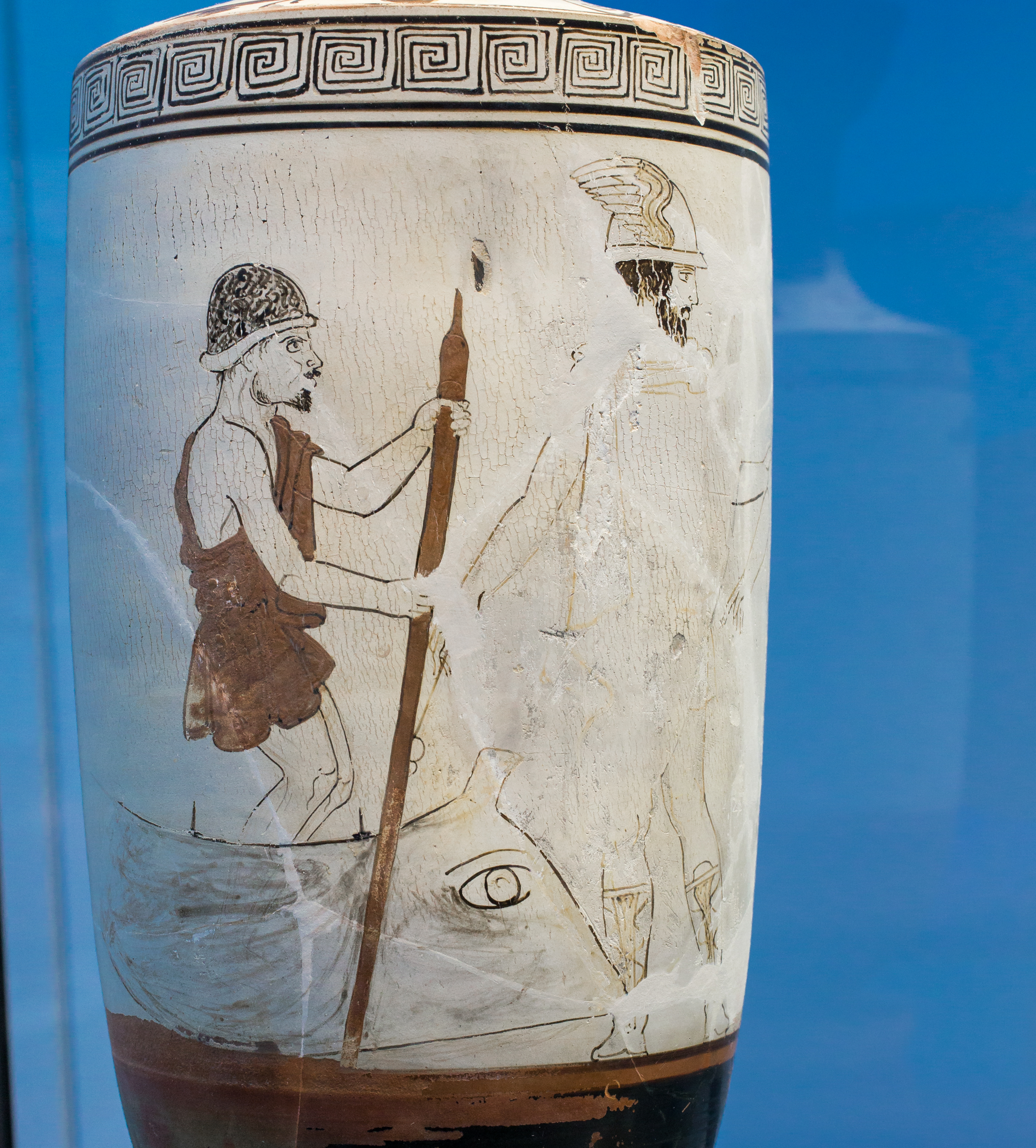
Charon with punt pole standing in his boat, receiving Hermes psychopompos who leads a deceased woman. Thanatos Painter, ca. 430 BC

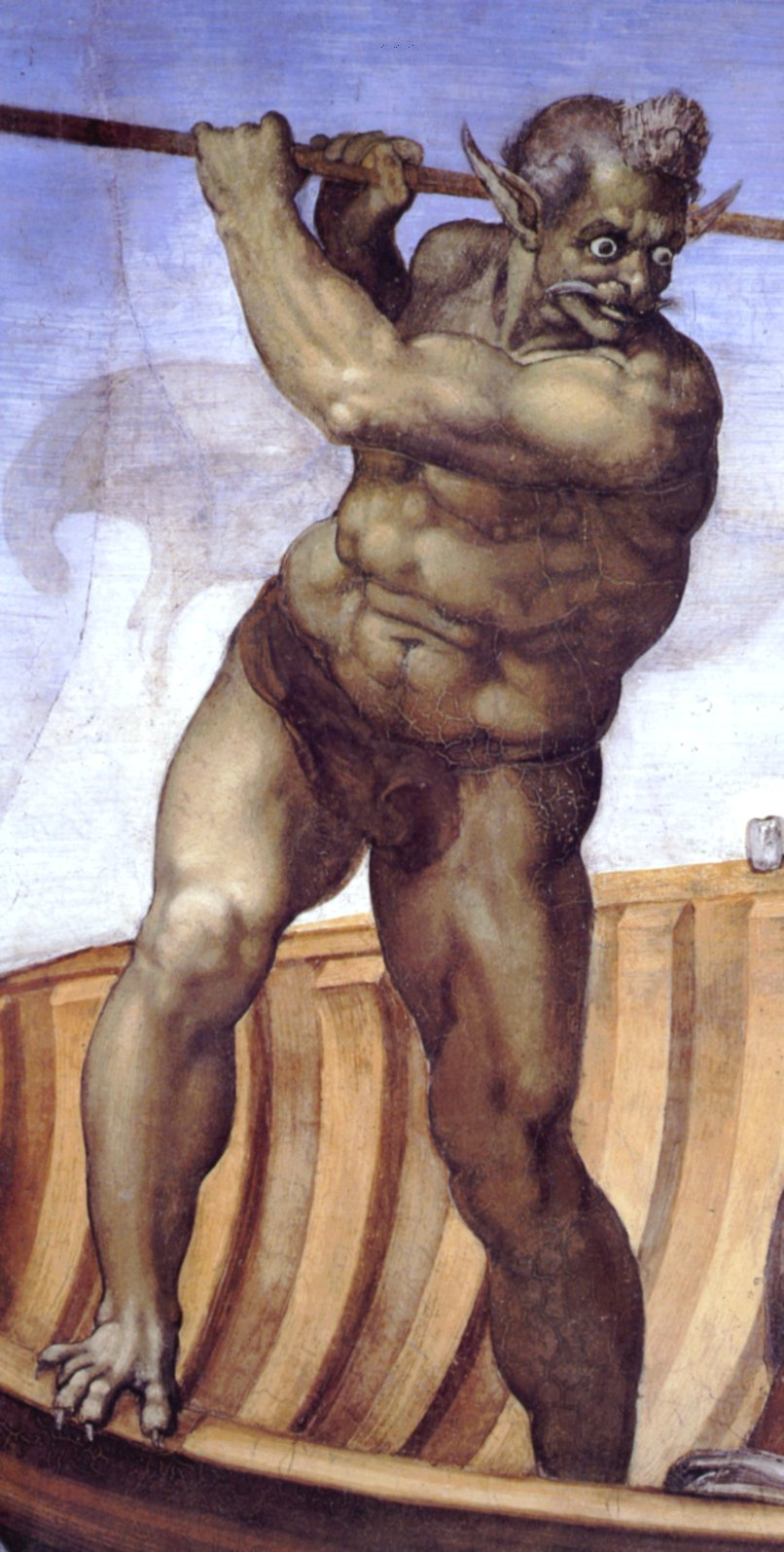
Charon as depicted by Michelangelo in his fresco The Last Judgment in the Sistine Chapel

Charon is depicted in the art of ancient Greece. Attic funerary vases of the 5th and 4th centuries BC are often decorated with scenes of the dead boarding Charon's boat. On the earlier such vases, he looks like a rough, unkempt Athenian seaman dressed in reddish-brown, holding his ferryman's pole in his right hand and using his left hand to receive the deceased. Hermes sometimes stands by in his role as psychopomp. On later vases, Charon is given a more "kindly and refined" demeanor.

In the 1st century BC, the Roman poet Virgil describes Charon, manning his rust-colored skiff, in the course of Aeneas's descent to the underworld (Aeneid, Book 6), after the Cumaean Sibyl has directed the hero to the golden bough that will allow him to return to the world of the living:

There Charon stands, who rules the dreary coast;
A sordid god: down from his hairy chin
A length of beard descends, uncombed, unclean;
His eyes, like hollow furnaces on fire;
A girdle, foul with grease, binds his obscene attire.

Other Latin authors also describe Charon, among them Seneca in his tragedy Hercules Furens, where Charon is described in verses 762–777 as an old man clad in foul garb, with haggard cheeks and an unkempt beard, a fierce ferryman who guides his craft with a long pole. When the boatman tells Heracles to halt, the Greek hero uses his strength to gain passage, overpowering Charon with the boatman's own pole.

In the second century, Lucian employed Charon as a figure in his Dialogues of the Dead, most notably in Parts 4 and 10 ("Hermes and Charon" and "Charon and Hermes").

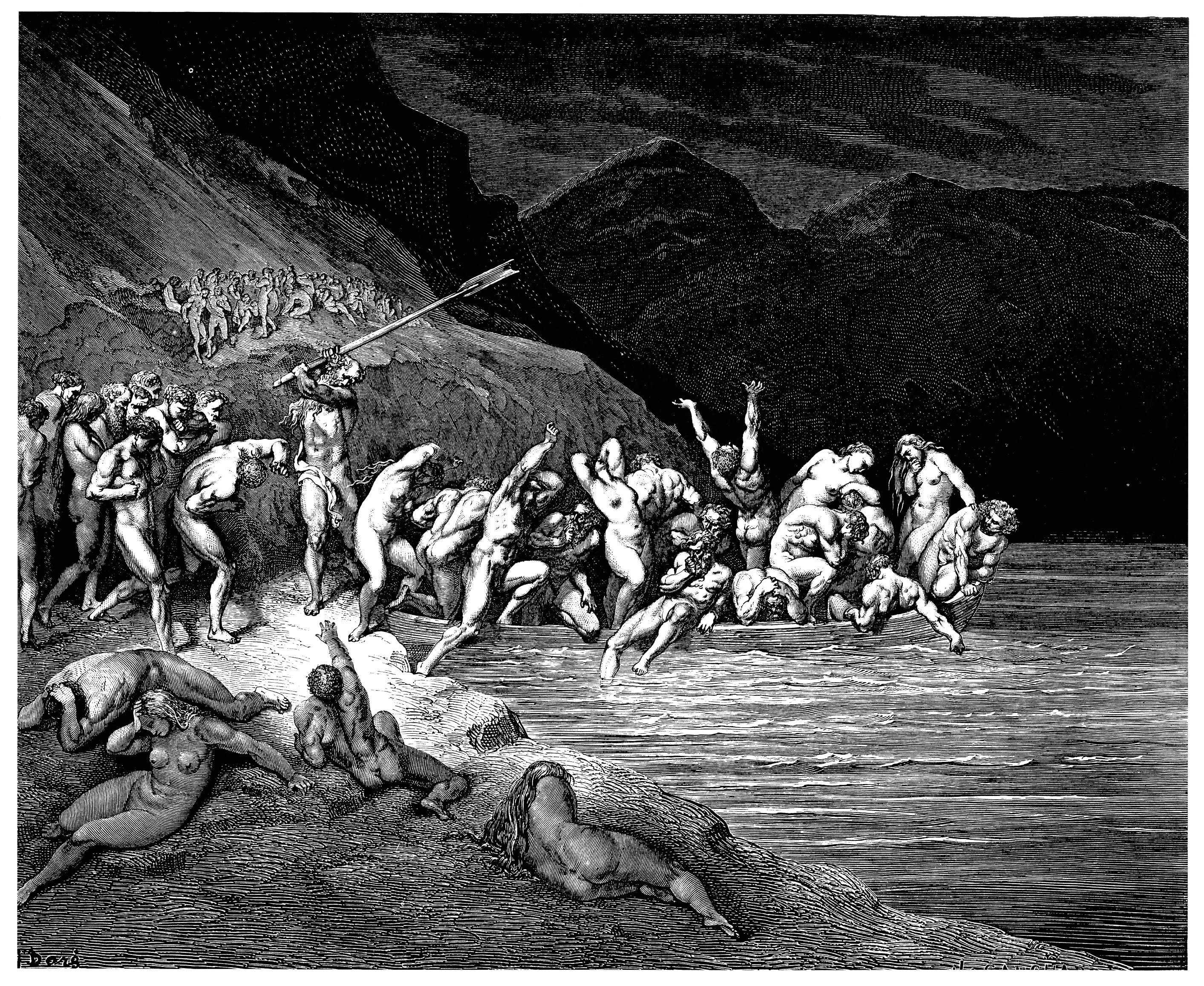
In the Divine Comedy, Charon forces reluctant sinners onto his boat by beating them with his oar. (Gustave Doré, 1857).

In the 14th century, Dante Alighieri described Charon in his Divine Comedy, drawing from Virgil's depiction in Aeneid 6. Charon is the first named mythological character Dante meets in the underworld, in Canto III of the Inferno. Dante depicts him as having eyes of fire. Elsewhere, Charon appears as a mean-spirited and gaunt old man or as a winged demon wielding a double hammer, although Michelangelo's interpretation, influenced by Dante's depiction in the Inferno, shows him with an oar over his shoulder, ready to beat those who delay ("batte col remo qualunque s'adagia", Inferno 3, verse 111). In modern times, he is commonly depicted as a living skeleton in a cowl, much like the Grim Reaper. The French artist Gustave Dore depicted Charon in two of his illustrations for Dante's Divine Comedy. The Flemish painter Joachim Patinir depicted Charon in his Crossing the River Styx. And the Spanish painter Jose Benlliure y Gil portrayed Charon in his La Barca de Caronte.

Though named after Charon, the Etruscan death-demon Charun has a different origin and functions, being an assistant to Death as well as psychopomp and guardian, delivering the newly dead to the underworld by horseback or chariot. He is winged, with pointed ears and a hideous and threatening appearance, and has a vulture's beak. He is armed with a very large hammer, with which to "mercilessly pummel" the dead.

== The Acheron and the Styx ==
Most accounts, including Pausanias (10.28) and later Dante's Inferno (3.78), associate Charon with the swamps of the river Acheron. Ancient Greek literary sources such as Pindar, Aeschylus, Euripides, Plato, and Callimachus also place Charon on the Acheron. Roman poets, including Propertius, Ovid, and Statius, name the river as the Styx, perhaps following the geography of Virgil's underworld in the Aeneid, where Charon is associated with both rivers.

== In astronomy ==
Charon, the largest moon of the dwarf planet Pluto, is named after him.

== In paleontology ==
The hadrosaurid Charonosaurus is named in Charon's honor because it was found along the banks of the Amur River in the Far East.

== See also ==
- Charun – in many respects, an Etruscan equivalent to Charon
- Coins for the dead
- Isle of the Dead – a painting by Swiss Symbolist artist Arnold Böcklin
- Manannán mac Lir – Ferryman from Irish mythology
- Manunggul Jar – Early depiction similar figure on burial jar from Tabon Caves on Palawan
- Phlegyas – a Greek king seen ferrying Dante and Virgil across the Styx in Inferno (Dante)
- Urshanabi – Ferryman from Mesopotamian mythology
