= Center for Hellenic Studies =

Research institute in Washington, D.C.

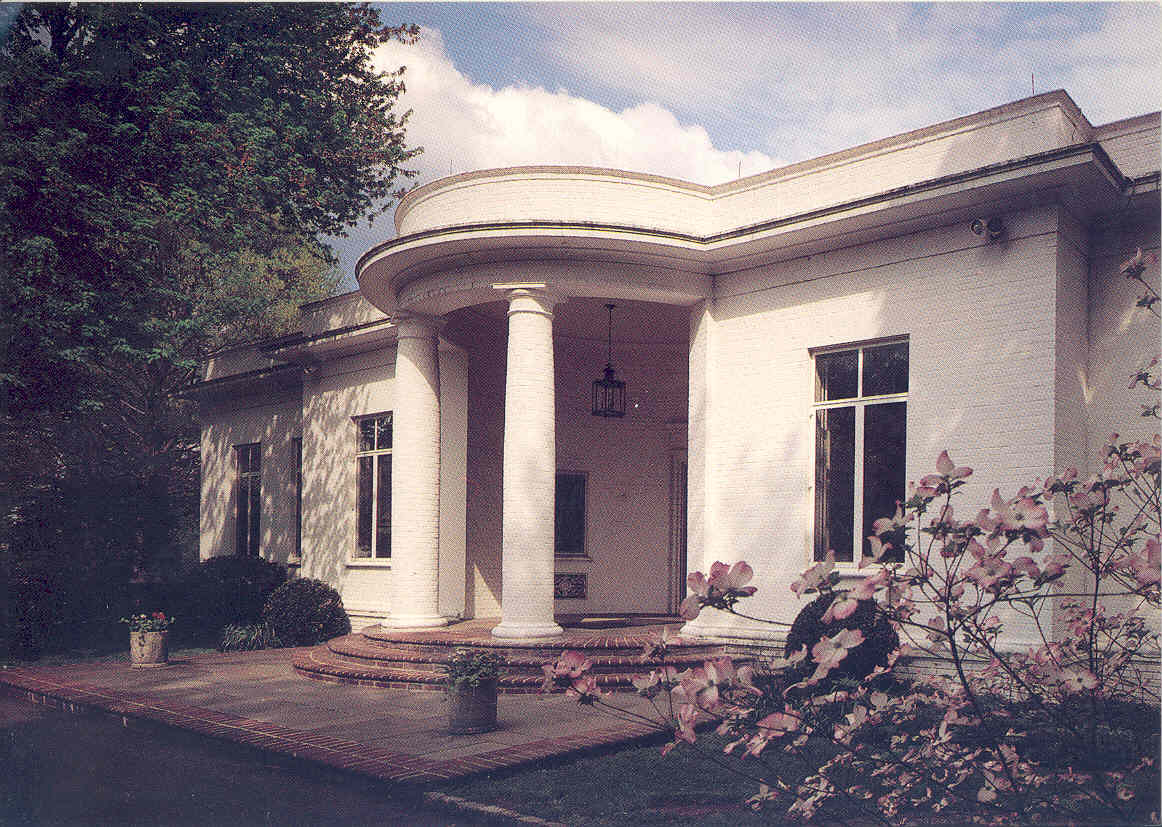
- Center for Hellenic Studies
- Interactive map of the Center for Hellenic Studies area

General information
- Location: Washington, D.C., United States
- Coordinates: 38.9176°N 77.0620°W

Website
- chs.harvard.edu

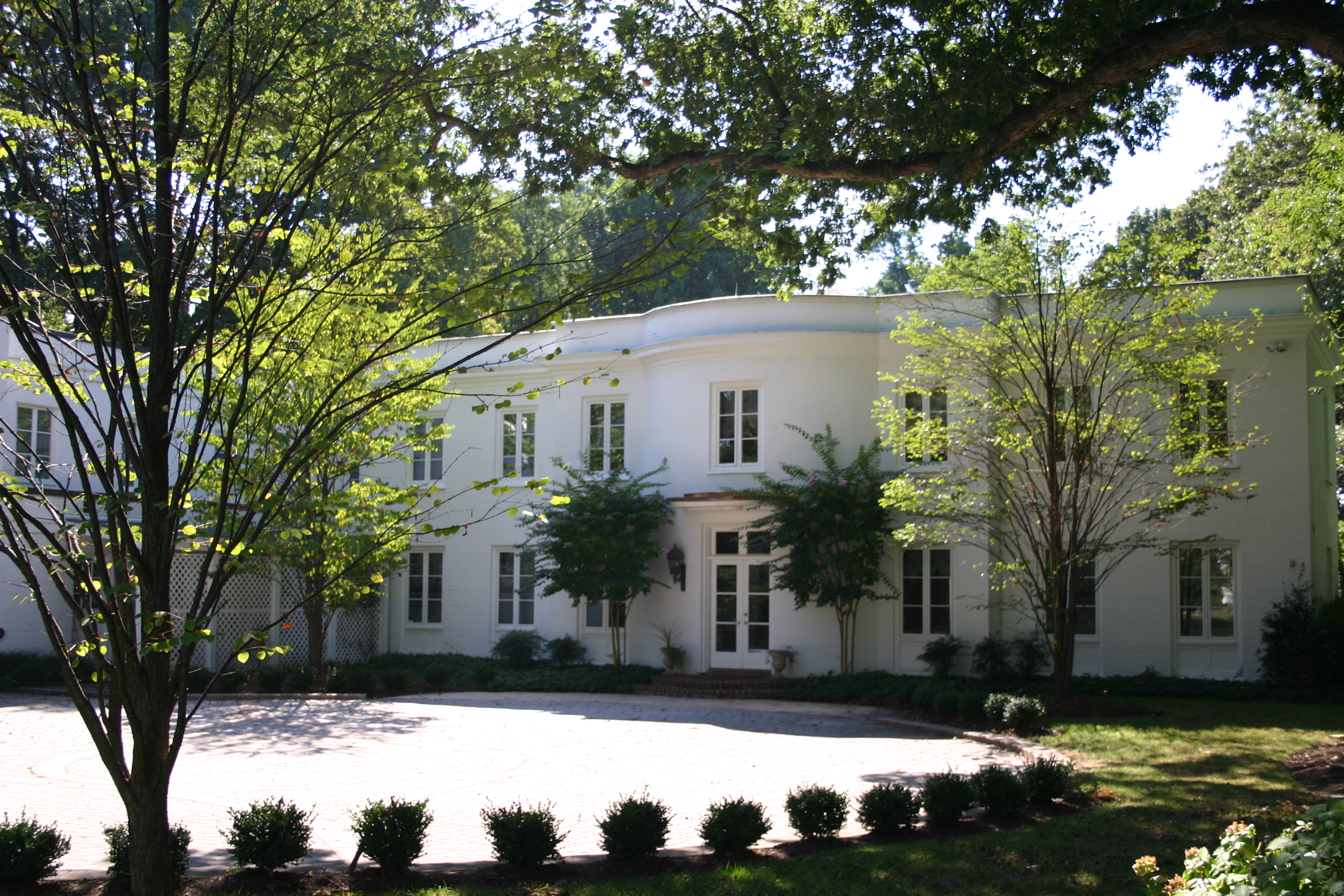
Director's Residence (2008)

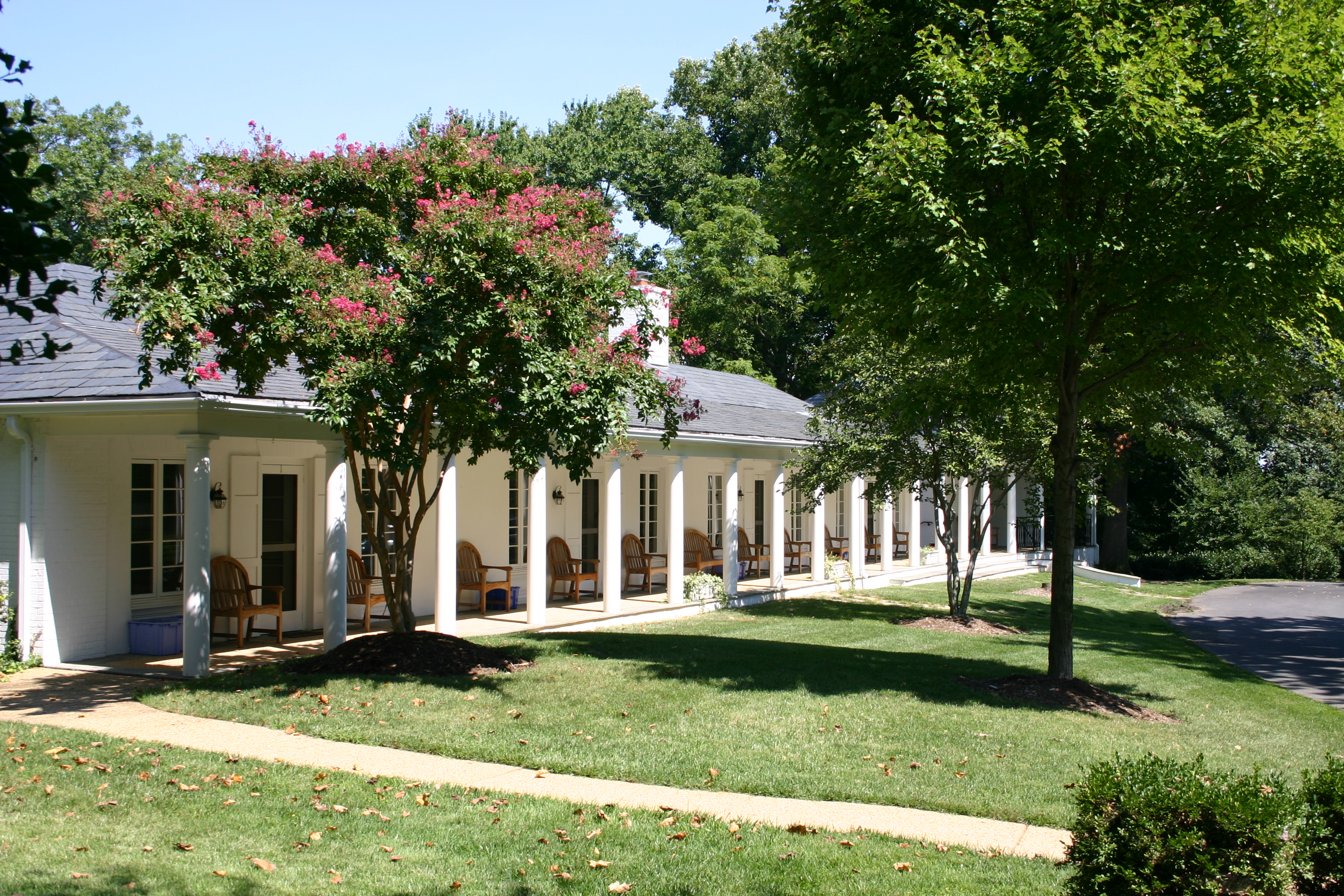
Center for Hellenic Studies, Stoa Apartments (2008)

The Center for Hellenic Studies (CHS) is a research institute for classics located in Washington, D.C. at 3100 Whitehaven Street NW. It is affiliated with Harvard University.

Nestled in Rock Creek Park behind Embassy Row, the Center for Hellenic Studies offers a variety of both residential and remote fellowships each year to scholars and researchers working on projects in a variety of fields, including "archaeology, art history, epigraphy, history, literary criticism, philology, philosophy, pedagogical applications, reception, and interdisciplinary studies". The center provides housing for "residential" fellows and their families, and accommodates remote fellows and visiting scholars during shorter stays. Fellows are selected by a panel of Senior Fellows, a group of five internationally selected senior classicists. Fellows are typically pre-tenured PhDs from around the world, most often from Europe or North America. The "Center", as it is commonly called, has been a stopping point in the careers of many budding classicists who have gone on to be major contributors in the field.

Center for Hellenic Studies is one of three centers for advanced research in the humanities belonging to Harvard but located outside of Cambridge, Massachusetts. The others are Dumbarton Oaks, founded in 1940, also in Washington, D.C., and Villa I Tatti, opened in 1961, in Florence, Italy.

== Director of the center ==
The director of the center is appointed by Harvard University. Michael C.J. Putnam (Brown University, 1962) was the first director, but acted as a substitute for Bernard Knox (Yale University, 1963–1985), the center's first official director. Knox was succeeded by Zeph Stewart (Harvard University, 1985–1992), and Stewart by co-directors Kurt Raaflaub and Deborah Boedeker (Brown University, 1992–2000). Gregory Nagy became director in 2000 and was succeeded by Mark Schiefsky in 2021.

== Campus ==
The wooded campus has a large mansion as the director's residence, a "stoa" with five apartments for the fellows without families, three cottages for the fellows with families, two subdivided cottages serving as double residences, five guest-rooms to accommodate visiting scholars, and one cottage that has been transformed into a multi-media conference facility.

== History ==
Starting in 2000, director Gregory Nagy brought a new focus on outreach (both national and international), information technology, publishing, and collaborative research to the Center for Hellenic Studies, as evidenced by the center's dynamic website. In 2003, under Nagy's direction, the center began renovations to transform one of the cottages into a new multi-media conference center. The design plans were drawn up by the architectural firm, Convergeo, and in 2006, the "Digital Agora" was unveiled.

== CHS Greece ==
In 2008, the Center for Hellenic Studies opened a campus in Nafplio, Greece.

== See also ==
- American Hellenic Institute
- Hellenic studies
