= Christos Tsagalis =

Greek classical scholar

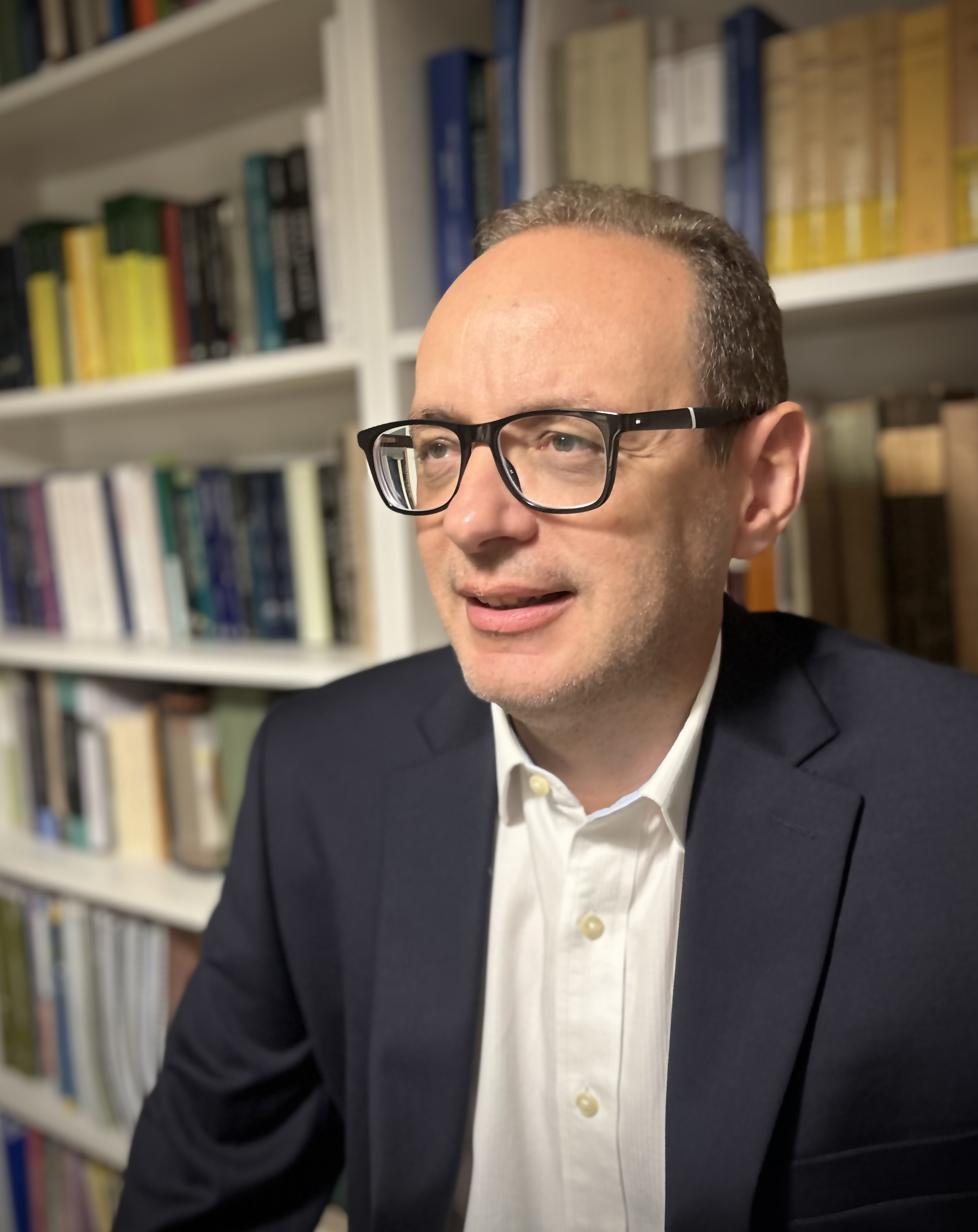
Christos Tsagalis

Christos Tsagalis (Greek: Χρήστος Τσαγγάλης), Member of the Academia Europaea (Section of Classics and Oriental Studies), is a Greek classical scholar. Since 2009 he is teaching at the Aristotle University of Thessaloniki, where he is a Professor of Ancient Greek Philology since 2013.

== Early life and education ==
Tsagalis studied at the University of Athens, graduating with a Bachelor of Arts (BA in Classics) degree in 1992. He then moved first to England, where he studied for a Master of Arts in Classics (MA) degree at King's College London with a thesis title "The Language of the Homeric Similes" (1993), and then to the United States, where he studied for a Doctor of Philosophy (PhD) degree in Classics at Cornell University. His doctoral thesis was titled "The Improvised Laments in the Iliad", and his PhD was awarded in 1998.

== Academic career ==
After completing his PhD, Tsagalis worked as an Instructor in Classics at the Department of Philology at the University of Crete (2000–2001) and was elected Lecturer (2001–2005) and then Assistant Professor in Ancient Greek Philology (2006–2008) at the University of Athens. In 2009 he was elected Associate Professor at the Department of Philology of the Aristotle University of Thessaloniki and in 2013 he became Full Professor in the same department.

== Research impact ==
Tsagalis' research interests pertain to archaic epic poetry, with an emphasis on Homer, Hesiod, epic fragments, and the epigram. The qualitative characteristics of his research contribution that has been evaluated as "a landmark in the study of the Greek epic poetry" refer to the establishment of oral, intertextual neoanalysis as a method of interpreting Homeric poetry by founding criteria that make possible the combination of oral theory with neoanalysis, the two dominant theories of Homer's study. Tsagalis' research has been characterized as "an original attempt to reconsider the implications of these theories, in order to overcome their schematisms and to "endorse a more flexible approach to certain scholarly taboos".

Moreover, his thorough study of the fragmentary Greek epic of the archaic and classical periods, which has been rather neglected and is not related to the Epic Cycle, has created a solid basis for obtaining a panoramic view of archaic Greek epic, beyond Homer and Hesiod.

Tsagalis showed a keen interest in the study of Greek epigram, both inscribed and literary. His work on fourth-century Attic funerary epigrams (2008) has been described as "most innovative ... examining the 4th century epigrams as an intermediate phase between non-literary epigrams and the literary epigrams of the Hellenistic age ... convincingly demonstrating that the traditional dichotomy between a prehistory and the proper history of Greek epigram is simplistic". His work "results in a wider and richer painting of the complex net binding proper literature and "subliterary" texts such as inscribed epigrams".

== Awards and distinctions ==
Tsagalis has been awarded the Excellence Award in Classical Philology by the Academy of Athens (2007), two Research Fellowships by the Center for Hellenic Studies in Greece, Harvard University (2002) and (2014), the Excellence Award in the Humanities, Aristotle University of Thessaloniki (2017), and the National Research Award by the Hellenic Foundation of Research and Innovation (2019).

In 2020 he was elected Member of the Academia Europaea (Section of Classics and Oriental Studies) and appointed Member of the Board and Director of the Department of Language and Literature of the Centre for the Greek Language ( Κέντρο Ελληνικής Γλώσσας).

== Publications ==
=== Authored books ===
- Epic Grief: Personal Laments in Homer's Iliad. Untersuchungen zur antiken Literatur und Geschichte, vol. 70, Walter de Gruyter, Berlin-New York 2004.
- The Oral Palimpsest: Exploring Intertextuality in the Homeric Epics. Center for Hellenic Studies/Harvard University Press, Cambridge, MA & London, England 2008.
- Inscribing Sorrow: Fourth-Century Attic Funerary Epigrams. Trends in Classics Supplementary Volumes, Band 1, Walter de Gruyter, Berlin-New York, 2008.
- From Listeners to Viewers: Space in the Iliad, Center for Hellenic Studies/Harvard University Press, Cambridge, MA & London, England 2012.
- Ομηρικές μελέτες: προφορικότητα, διακειμενικότητα, νεοανάλυση, Ίδρυμα Μανόλη Τριανταφυλλίδη, Θεσσαλονίκη 2016.
- Early Greek Epic Fragments 'Ι': Antiquarian and Genealogical Epic. Trends in Classics Supplementary Volumes, vol. 47, Walter de Gruyter, Berlin-New York 2017.
- Tέχνη ραψωδική: Η εκτέλεση της επικής ποίησης: από την αρχαϊκή έως την αυτοκρατορική περίοδο, University Studio Press, Thessaloniki 2018.
- Early Greek Epic Fragments ΙΙ: Κreophylos and Peisandros. Trends in Classics Supplementary Volumes, vol. 129, Walter de Gruyter, Berlin-New York 2022.
- Early Greek Epic: Language, Interpretation, Performance ends in Classics Supplementary Volumes, Walter de Gruyter, Berlin-New York (2023).
- Early Greek Epic Fragments ΙΙI: The Herakleia of Panyassis and the Theseis (Walter de Gruyter 2024).
- The Homeric Doloneia: Evolution and Shaping of Iliad 10 (Oxford University Press 2024)

== Edited and co-edited books (with authored chapters) ==
- N. Bezantakos & C. Tsagalis (eds.), Μουσάων Ἀρχώμεθα: Ο Ησίοδος και η αρχαϊκή επική ποίηση. Athens, 2006.
- A. Rengakos & C. Tsagalis (eds.), Prizes and Contests in the Homeric Epics. Ithaki, 2007.
- A. Markantonatos & C. Tsagalis (eds.), Αρχαία Ελληνική Τραγωδία: Θεωρία και Πράξη. Athens, 2008.
- F. Montanari, A. Rengakos, and C. Tsagalis (eds.), Brill's Companion to Hesiod. Leiden, 2009.
- Phil Mitsis & Christos Tsagalis (eds.), Allusion, Authority, and Truth: Critical Perspectives on Greek Poetic and Rhetorical Praxis, Trends in Classics Supplementary Volumes, vol. 7, Walter de Gruyter, Berlin-New York, 2010.
- C. Tsagalis (ed.), Homeric Hypertextuality, a special issue in Trends in Classics 2.2, Walter de Gruyter, 2010.
- F. Montanari, A. Rengakos, and C. Tsagalis (eds.), Homeric Contexts: Neoanalysis and the Interpretation of Oral Poetry, Trends in Classics Supplementary Volumes, vol. 13, Walter de Gruyter, Berlin-New York, 2012.
- C. Tsagalis (ed.), Theban Resonances in Homeric Epic, a special issue of the journal Trends in Classics 6.2 (2014).
- M. Fantuzzi and C. Tsagalis (eds.), The Greek Epic Cycle and Its Ancient Reception, Cambridge University Press, Cambridge, 2015.
- C. Tsagalis & A. Markantonatos (ed.), The Winnowing Oar: New Perspectives in Homeric Studies, (2017, Walter de Gruyter).
- C. Tsagalis (ed.), Poetry in Fragments: Studies on the Hesiodic Corpus and its Afterlife, (2017, Walter de Gruyter).
- J. Ready and C. Tsagalis (eds.), Homer in Performance: Rhapsodes, Narrators & Characters, (2018, University of Texas Press).
- C. Tsagalis (ed.), Heracles in Early Greek Epic (2024, Brill, Mnemosyne Supplements 482).

== Editorial work ==
Since 2017 Tsagalis is the co-editor (with Jonathan Ready, University of Michigan, Ann Arbor) of the Yearbook of Ancient Greek Epic (YAGE), Brill Academic Publishers and since 2019 (with Patrick Finglass, University of Bristol and Simon Malloch,University of Nottingham) of the series Key Perspectives on Classical Research (KPCR), Walter de Gruyter.
