= Dariush Shayegan =

Iranian cultural theorist and philosopher (1935–2018)

داریوش شایگان Dariush Shayegan
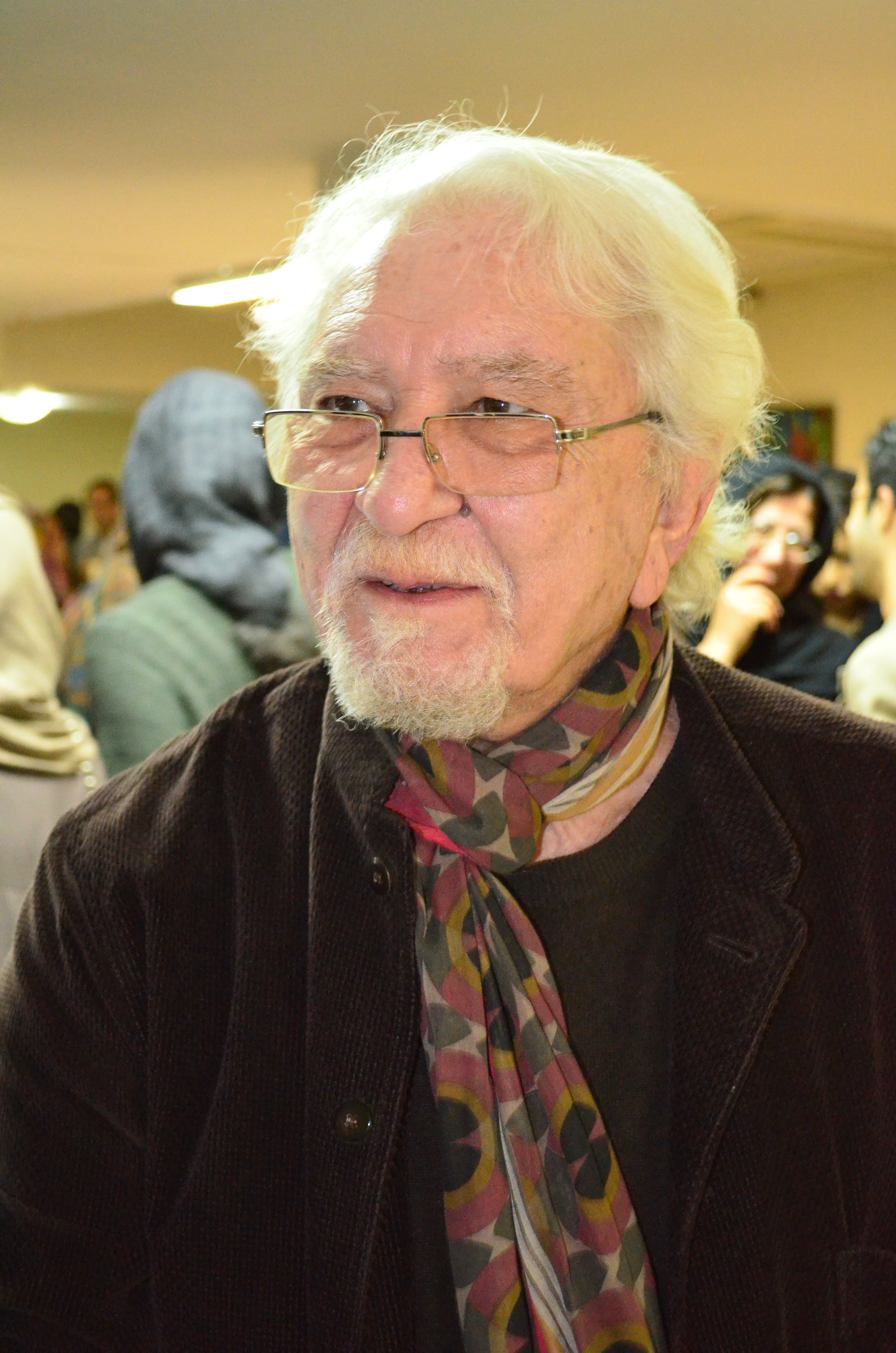
- Shaygan in 2013
- Born: 24 January 1935; Tabriz, Iran
- Died: 22 March 2018 (aged 83); Tehran, Iran
- Occupations: Philosopher and former university professor
- Relatives: M. Rahim Shayegan (son)

Dariush Shayegan (Persian: داریوش شایگان; 24 January 1935 – 22 March 2018) was one of the most consequential thinkers of contemporary Iran and the Near East.

== Life and career ==
He was born in Tabriz from a Shia Iranian Azeri father and a Georgian Sunni mother; his mother descended from an aristocratic family from Georgia. Shayegan studied at the Sorbonne University in Paris. He was a Professor of Sanskrit and Indian religions at the Tehran University. Besides Persian, Shayegan wrote in French and English, and spoke fluently Georgian, Russian, and Turkish (both Ottoman and Azeri).. Having spent his teens at boarding school in Great Britain, Shayegan subsequently lived, during his formative years, in Geneva, where he studied French literature, philosophy, Sanskrit, and political science at the Université de Genève. Shayegan received his doctorate (doctorat de troisième cycle) at the Sorbonne under the tutelage of his adviser Henry Corbin, with a thesis entitled: Les relations de l'hindouisme et du soufisme d'après le "Majma’ al-Baḥrayn" de Dārā Shokūh.

Shayegan has written many pioneering works on the epistemological specificities of eastern and western cultures and the possibility of dialogue between them. He was the founding director of the Iranian Center for the Studies of Civilizations, which launched its work in 1977 with an international symposium on the "dialogue between civilizations," a concept that has been selectively appropriated by the former Iranian President Mohammad Khatami. In 2009 Shayegan was awarded the inaugural Global Dialogue Prize, an international award for "outstanding achievements in the advancement and application of intercultural value research", in recognition of his dialogical conception of cultural subjectivity (for a statement of the award committee and a scholarly presentation (including a fairly complete bibliography) of Shayegan's contribution to intercultural dialogue, see the (copyrighted) webpages of this award.)

== Personal life ==
His son, M. Rahim Shayegan, is an American historian and expert in history of ancient Iran.

== Death ==
Shayegan died on 22 March 2018, at the age of 83 in Tehran.

== Works ==
Main works by Shayegan:

- Hindouisme et Soufisme, une lecture du «Confluent des Deux Océans», Éditions de la Différence, Paris 1979, 2nd edition, Albin Michel, Paris
- Qu'est-ce qu'une révolution religieuse? Presses d'aujourd'hui, Paris 1982, deuxième édition, Bibliothèque Albin Michel des idées, Paris,1991.
- Le regard mutilé, Schizophrénie culturelle : pays traditionnels face à la modernité, Albin English Translation : Cultural Schizophrenia, Islamic Societies Confronting the West, Translated from the French by John Howe, Saqi books, London 1992. Also published by Syracuse University Press, 1997.
- Henry Corbin, La topographie spirituelle de l'Islam iranien, Éditions de la Différence, Paris, 1990
- Les illusions de l'identité, Éditions du Félin, Paris, 1992
- Sous les ciels du monde, Entretiens avec Ramin Jahanbegloo, Éditions du Félin,1992
- Au-delà du miroir, Diversité culturelle et unité des valeurs, Editions de l'Aube, 2004
- La lumière vient de l'Occident, Le réenchantement du monde et la pensée nomade, L'aube, essai. Paris, 2001, troisième édition, 2005, quatriéme édition, essai poche, 2008
- Terre de mirages, avec la collaboration de Maryam Askari, La collection Regards croisés, Éditions de l'Aube, Paris, 2004

Works on Shayegan:

- Mehrzad Borujerdi : Iranian Intellectuals and the West, Syracuse University Press, 1996
- Afsaneh Gächter, Daryush Shayegan, interkulturell gelesen, Interkulturelle Bibliothek, Traugott Bautz, Nordhausen 2005
- Dariush Borbor, the well-known Iranian architect and urban planner has discussed his seventy years of intimate friendship with Shayegan and his family in an interview, 2018

== See also ==
- Intellectual Movements in Iran
- Iranian Studies
- Persian philosophy
- Henri Corbin
- Daryoush Ashouri
- Aydin Aghdashloo
- List of University of Tehran people
