= Hamid Soltanian-Zadeh =

Iranian biomedical engineer

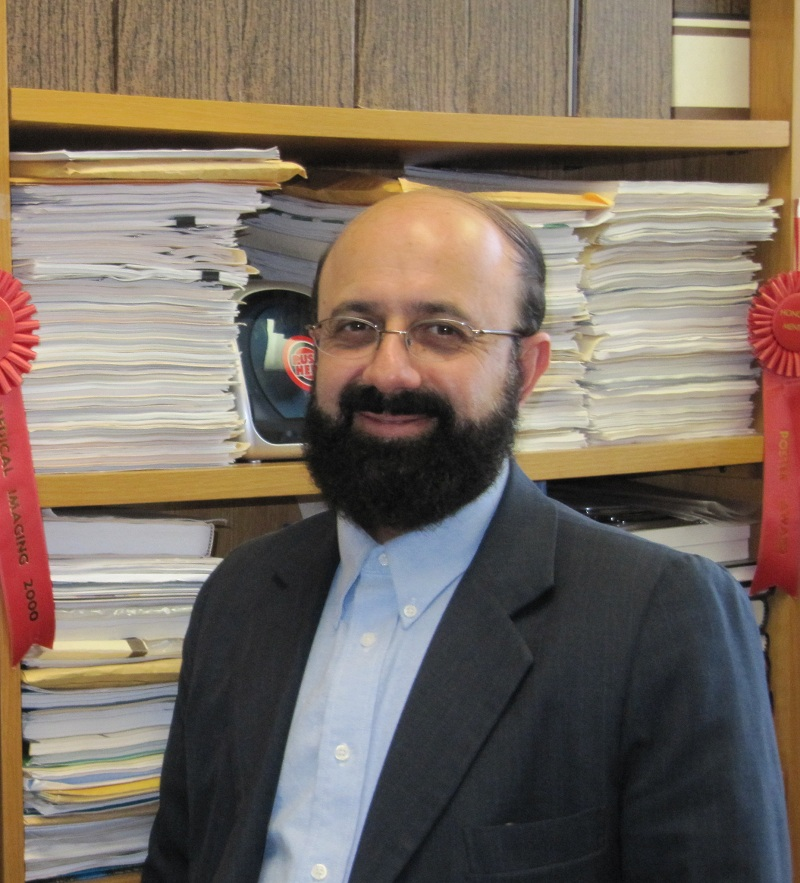
- Born: 1960 (age 65–66); Yazd, Iran
- Education: University of Michigan
- Children: 3
- Scientific career
- Fields: Biomedical Engineering, Image Processing and Pattern Recognition
- Workplaces: University of Tehran and Henry Ford Health System

Hamid Soltanian-Zadeh (Persian: حمید سلطانیان زاده) is an Iranian biomedical engineer. He was born in Yazd in 1960.

== Education ==
He received BS and MS degrees in electrical engineering: electronics (with honors) from the University of Tehran, Tehran, Iran in 1986 and MSE and PhD degrees in electrical engineering: systems and bio-electrical sciences from the University of Michigan, Ann Arbor, Michigan, USA, in 1992.

== Career ==
He is currently a full Professor and a founder of Control and Intelligent Processing Center of Excellence (CIPCE) in the Department of Electrical and Computer Engineering at the University of Tehran, Tehran, Iran. As a senior scientist and head of medical image analysis group, Prof. Soltanian-Zadeh directs research projects in the Department of Radiology, Henry Ford Health System, Detroit, Michigan, USA. He has active research collaborations with the Institute for Research in Fundamental Sciences (IPM), Tehran, Iran and Wayne State University, Detroit, MI, USA. His research interests include medical imaging, signal and image processing and analysis, pattern recognition, and neural networks.

He has supervised or advised over 100 MS theses or PhD dissertations and coauthored more than 600 publications in journals and conference records or as book chapters. Several of Prof. Soltanian-Zadeh's presentations received honorable mention awards at the SPIE and IEEE conferences.

== Affiliations ==
In addition to the IEEE, where he is a senior member and chairman of the Iran Section, he is a member of the SPIE, ISMVIP, and ISBME and has served on the scientific committees of several national and international conferences and review boards of more than 30 scientific journals. Prof. Soltanian-Zadeh is an associate member of the Iranian Academy of Sciences, president of the Iranian Society of Machine Vision and Image Processing (ISMVIP), has been recognized as an outstanding researcher by the national and international organizations, and has served on the study sections of the National Institutes of Health (NIH), National Science Foundation (NSF), American Institute of Biological Sciences (AIBS), and international funding agencies.

== See also ==
- List of contemporary Iranian scientists, scholars, and engineers
- List of University of Tehran people
