= Mohammad Ali Sahraian =

Dr Mohammad Ali Sahraian is a neurologist and a researcher currently working in Sina Hospital which is affiliated to Tehran University of Medical Sciences. His main field of research is multiple sclerosis, and he established the first specialised ward for that disease in Iran. He is one of the two main authors of "MRI Atlas of MS Lesions", published by Springer.
