= Saeid Akbari =

Iranian Sports journalist & Television Presenter

Saeed Akbari
- سعید اکبری
- Born: 1986 (age 39–40); Tehran, Iran
- Education: Master's degree in Sports Journalism; Master's degree in Communication Studies
- Occupations: Television presenter, sports journalist, media consultant
- Years active: 2003–present
- Known for: Hosting sports programs on IRIB; media consulting for Esteghlal F.C. and Nassaji Mazandaran F.C.

Saeed Akbari (Persian: سعید اکبری) is an Iranian sports journalist and television presenter. He has worked in sports journalism and television broadcasting, including presenting sports segments on Salam Sobh Bekheir, a morning program broadcast on IRIB TV3. In January 2023, he announced that he had ended his collaboration with Iranian state television.

== Personal life ==
Akbari was born in 1985 in Tehran, Iran. He holds a master's degree in sports journalism and a master's degree in communication studies from the University of Tehran.

== Professional career ==
=== Media work with sports clubs ===
==== Nassaji Mazandaran ====
Alongside his work in sports journalism and television, Akbari has held media-related positions at Iranian football clubs. He worked with Nassaji Mazandaran F.C. during different periods, including the tenure of head coach Javad Nekounam. In December 2018, following the end of Nekounam's collaboration with the club, Akbari also resigned from his position as the club's public relations director.

==== Foolad Khuzestan ====
From 2022 to 2023, Akbari worked with Foolad F.C., where he served as an adviser to the club's managing director and head coach. His responsibilities involved media-related activities and communication within the club's management structure. During this period, Foolad participated in domestic competitions and qualified for the AFC Champions League.

==== Esteghlal ====
In 2023, Akbari joined the media staff of Esteghlal F.C. during Javad Nekounam's tenure as head coach. His appointment initially faced administrative issues, and he first worked with the coaching staff before his position as the club's media director was formally established. In December 2023, his appointment was reported by several Iranian media outlets, and he appeared alongside Nekounam at a press conference.

In February 2024, Akbari was removed from his position at Esteghlal amid disagreements within the club's management. The departure was reported by Asr Iran, which covered changes involving members of the club's media staff during the dispute between Nekounam and managing director Ali Khatir.

=== Interviews ===
As a television presenter, Akbari has interviewed individuals from Iranian sports, football and cinema. His interviewees have included actors, former football players, coaches, sports administrators and other public figures. These interviews have been published or broadcast through various Iranian media outlets and television programs.

Among those interviewed by Akbari are actor Iman Safa, actor Roozbeh Hesari, former footballer Pirouz Ghorbani, former footballer Karim Bagheri, screenwriter Amir Mehdi Jouleh, former footballer Hossein Kaebi, former footballer Behrouz Rahbarifard, journalist and author Simon Kuper, and former Iranian Minister of Sports and Youth Masoud Soltanifar.

==== Interview with Mohammad Akhoundi ====
In December 2021, Akbari interviewed Mohammad Akhoundi, a former spokesperson for Iran's Physical Education Organization, about the dismissal of Ali Daei as head coach of the Iran national football team in 2009. During the interview, Akhoundi stated that Daei's dismissal following the team's defeat against Saudi Arabia had been ordered by then-president Mahmoud Ahmadinejad. The interview and Akhoundi's claims were subsequently covered by several Iranian news outlets, including Mehr News Agency, Radio Farda and the Iranian Labour News Agency (ILNA).

== Special program "Dari Roo Be Jam" ==
In 2026, Akbari co-hosted Dari Roo Be Jam, a live sports program produced by Aparat Sport in connection with the 2026 FIFA World Cup. The program was presented by Akbari and Azadeh Sadiri and broadcast online during the tournament. Its content included match analysis, reviews of World Cup events, interviews with sports figures and discussions of developments surrounding the competition.

=== Panjereh-i Roo Be Jam ===
Before Dari Roo Be Jam, Akbari hosted Panjereh-i Roo Be Jam (Persian: پنجره‌ای رو به جام; "A Window onto the World Cup"), a program produced by Aparat Sport as a series leading up to the 2026 FIFA World Cup. The 26-episode series featured former players and members of the Iran national football team's coaching staff, who discussed and recalled Iran's participation in previous editions of the FIFA World Cup. The program explored the experiences and memories of individuals involved in the national team's World Cup campaigns.

== Departure from IRIB ==
In January 2023, Akbari announced that he had ended his collaboration with IRIB. He had previously presented sports programs on IRIB TV3. In a statement published on his Instagram account, Akbari explained his absence from television, saying that he had decided not to comply with demands to make negative statements about Iranian athletes. He also criticized attempts by television managers to have presenters repeat statements against athletes.

== Works ==
| Year | Title | Platform | Role | Program type | Source |
|---|---|---|---|---|---|
| 2019 | Salam Sobh Bekheir, "Se Konj" | IRIB TV3 | Host | General | |
| 2021 | Salam Sobh Bekheir, sports segment | IRIB TV3 | Host | Sports | |
| 2024 | Nimkat | Aan Video Network | Host | Sports | |
| 2025 | Panjereh-i Roo Be Jam | Filimo and Aparat | Host | 2026 FIFA World Cup special | |
| 2026 | Dari Roo Be Jam | Filimo and Aparat | Host | 2026 FIFA World Cup special | |
