= Saeed Moshiri =

Iranian economist

- سعید مشیری
- Born: 1957 (age 68–69)
- Education: University of Manitoba (PhD), University of Toronto (MA), University of Tarbiat Modarres (BA, MA)
- Scientific career
- Fields: economics
- Institutions: University of Saskatchewan

Saeed Moshiri (born 1957) is an Iranian economist and Professor of Economics at the University of Saskatchewan. He is known for his works on growth, innovation, productivity and energy.

== Books ==
- Economics of Money and Banking, with Hamid Bahmanpoor, Tehran: Nashr-e Ney, 2010
- Freakonomics: A Rogue Economist Explores the Hidden Side of Everything (tr.), Steven Levitt, Stephen J. Dubner, Tehran: Nashr-e Ney, 2007
- Study Guide Accompanying Macroeconomics, with Abel, Bernanke, Smith, and Kneebone,6th Canadian edition, Pearson Canada, 2011.
- Test bank for Macroeconomics, with Abel, Bernanke, Smith, and Kneebone, 6th Canadian edition, Pearson Canada, 2011
