= Sayed Ebrahim Dibaji =

Sayed Ebrahim Dibaji (Persian: سید ابراهیم دیباجی) is an Iranian philosopher, author, and an emeritus professor of philosophy at the University of Tehran. During his academic career, including 46 years of teaching philosophy, Dibaji authored many books on philosophy that were published by the University of Tehran Press.
