= Razi Hirmandi =

Iranian translator and writer

Razi Hirmandi (real name: Seyyed Mohammad Razi Khodadadi; Persian: سید محمد رضی خدادادی; born 2 January 1948) is an Iranian translator, writer, researcher, and critic specializing in children's and young adult literature. He is known for introducing many influential English‑language children's authors to Persian readers through translations noted for their literary fidelity and natural, readable Persian.

== Early life and education ==
Hirmandi was born in Zabol, in Iran’s historic Sistan region. Growing up in an area with a rich tradition of oral storytelling and folklore, he developed an early interest in literature and language.

He studied English literature at Mashhad University and later earned an M.A. in general linguistics from Tehran University.

== Career ==
Over several decades, Hirmandi has translated and authored dozens of books for children, young adults, and adults. His translations include works by Dr. Seuss, Shel Silverstein, Roald Dahl, Martin Waddell, Davide Cali, Shinsuke Yoshitake, Cori Doerrfeld, and other internationally recognized authors. Many of these translations have gone through multiple editions and are catalogued by the National Library of Iran. In addition to translation, he has written articles and essays on children's literature, literary translation, humour, and reading culture, and has participated in conferences, lectures, interviews, and round‑table discussions promoting high‑quality children's literature.

In 2000, he received a three‑month research scholarship from the International Youth Library in Munich, where he conducted a study on humour in children's literature.

== Awards and honours ==
- Honourable Mention, FIT–Astrid Lindgren Prize for the Translation of Children's and Young Adult Literature (2025), presented at the 25th FIT World Congress in Geneva.
- Golden Flying Turtle and several Certificates of Honour from the Children's Book Council of Iran and the Institute for the Intellectual Development of Children and Young Adults.
- Recognition as one of the Lasting Cultural Figures of Sistan and Baluchestan Province.
- A three‑month research fellowship at the International Youth Library, Munich (2000).

== Selected works ==
Hirmandi has translated numerous children's and young adult books from English into Persian, including works by Dr. Seuss, Shel Silverstein, Roald Dahl, Martin Waddell, Davide Cali, Shinsuke Yoshitake, Cori Doerrfeld, and other leading international authors and illustrators. Many of these translations have been reprinted in multiple editions and are preserved in the National Library of Iran.

== Works ==
=== Stories ===
- From the blossom to the tree/ Institute for the Intellectual Development of Children and Young Adults
- If I am not there/ Beh Nashre
- There is a song in every heart/ Beh Nashre
- A break with Parvanak/ Elmi va Farhangi
- Once upon a time we too (Co-author: Ali Khaza'ifar)/ Cheshmeh
- The diary of a son written by his father/ Cheshmeh

=== Books translated for adults ===
- I am Joaquin: Rodolfo Gonzalez/ Amir Kabir
- Child -to -child: Aarons and others/ Daftr-e omour-e komak Amouzeshi
- Marching song: John Whiting/ Javid
- Sukhomlinsky on Education: Simon Soloveichik/ Hastan
- The languages of the world: Kennet Katzner/ Iran University Press
- Becoming a translator: Douglas Robinson/ Iran University Press
- The death of Ivan: Ilych LevTolstoy/ Whale

Publication

- Dictionary of humorous quotations: Oxford, Longman/ Farhang Mo'aser
- The Devil's Dictionary: Ambrose Bierce/ Farhang Mo'aser
- Shel Silverstein: Ruth k MacDonald/ Hastan
- Haiku humor: Stephen Addiss/ Cheshmeh
- Haiku love: British Museum Publisher/ Cheshmeh
- The sound of love, quotes on mother, love, friendship: Compiled/ Ghatreh
- The greatest war stories never told: Rick Beyer/ Mo'in
- Sod, Calm and get angry: Robert Lowell and one more/ Javid
- The complete and utter history of the world: Sarah Burton/ Cheshmeh
- Quotes from goats: Dan Montenero/ Porteghal
- Art is the highest form of hope / Whale Publication

=== Books translated for children and young adults ===
- The giving tree: Shel Silverstein/ Hastan
- Lafcadio, the lion who shot back: Shel Silverstein/ Hastan
- The missing piece: Shel Silverstein/ Hastan
- The missing piece meets the big O: Shel Silverstein/ Hastan
- A giraffe and a half: Shel Silverstein/ Hastan
- Who needs a cheap rhinoceros?: Shel Silverstein/ Hastan
- The ABZ of uncle Shelby: Shel Silverstein/ Hastan
- Where the sidewalk ends: Shel Silverstein/ Hastan
- A light in the attic: Shel Silverstein/ Hastan
- Inch by inch: Leo Lionni/ The Institute for Intellectual Development of Children and Young adults
- I won't apologize: Sofia Prokofieva/ The Institute for Intellectual Development of Children and Young Adults
- Can't you asleep, little bear?: Martin Waddell/ Ofoq
- Good for you, little bear: Martin Waddell/ Ofoq
- Let's go home, little bear: Martin Waddell/ Ofoq
- Sleep tight little bear: Martin Waddell/ Ofoq
- What's the use of a moose?: Martin Waddell/ Ofoq
- You and me, little bear: Martin Waddell/ Ofoq
- Oh, the places you will go: Dr. Seuss/ Ofoq
- Did I ever tell you how lucky you are?: Dr. Seuss/ Ofoq
- I had trouble in getting to Sollo Sollew: Dr. Seuss/ Ofoq
- Marvin K Mooney, will you please go now!: Dr. Seuss/ Ofoq
- The Sneetches and other stories: Dr. Seuss/ Ofoq
- The cat in the hat: Dr. Seuss/ Ofoq
- The cat in the hat comes back: Dr. Seuss/ Ofoq
- Horton hatches the eggs: Dr. Seuss/ Ofoq
- And to think that I saw it on Malburry Road: Dr. Seuss/ Ofoq
- I can lick 30 tigers today: Dr. Seuss/ Ofoq
- If ran the circus: Dr. Seuss/ Ofoq
- Horton hears a Who: Dr. Seuss/ Ofoq
- Lorax: Dr. Seuss/ Ofoq
- Daisy-head mayzi: Dr. Seuss/ Ofoq
- I wish that I had duck feet: Dr. Seuss/ Ofoq
- On the wings of peace: A group of writers/ Moin
- The good citizen's alphabet and the history of the world in epitome: Bertrand Russell/ Ofoq
- Once there was a tree: Phyllis Busch/ Amir Kabir
- The revolting rhymes: Roald Dahl/ Cheshmeh
- You're a bad man, Mr. gum: Andy Stanton/ Charkhe Falak
- Mr. gum and the biscuit billionaire: Andy Stanton/ Charkhe Falak
- Mr. Gum and the goblins: Andy Stanton/Charkhe Falak
- Mr. Gum and the Power crystal: Andy Stanton/ Charkhe Falak
- Mr. Gum and the dancing bear: Andy Stanton/ Charkhe Falak
- Mr. Gum in 'The Hound of Lamonic Bibber: Andy Stanton/ Charkhe Falak
- What's for dinner Mr. Gum: Andy Stanton/ Charkhe Falak
- Mr. Gum and the dancing bear: Andy Stanton/ Charkhe Falak
- Mr. Gum and the cherry tree: Andy Stanton/ Charkhe Falak
- Mr. Gum and the secret hideout: Andy Stanton/ Charkhe Falak
- The story of Matthew buzzington: Andy Stanton/ Charkhe Falak
- The cat in the hat (Translated into verse with the cooperation of Emran Salahi)/ Golagha
- The invention of Hugo cabret: Brian Selznick/ Ofoq
- Everything on it: Shel Silverstein/ Ofoq
- The house in the night: Swan Mary Swanson/ Ghoghnoos
- The absolutely true diary of a part-time Indian: Sherman Alexie/ Ofoq
- Mr. Stink: David Walliams/ Golagha
- Wonderstruck: Sherman Alexie/ Ofoq
- The butter battle book: Dr. Seuss/ Ofoq
- You're old only once: Dr. Seuss/ Gaam
- Yertle the turtle: Dr. Seuss/ Gaam
- If I ran the zoo: Dr. Seuss/ Gaam
- Changes :Anthony Brown/ Ghoghnoos
- What do you want to be, Brian?: Jeanne Willis/ Bafarzandan
- I didn't do my homework because...: Davide Cali/ Ofoq
- The day the crayons quit: Drew Daywalt/ Bafarzandan
- Bunny loves to read Peter: Bently/ Chekkeh
- Bunny loves to write: Peter Bently/ Chekkeh
- Bunny loves to learn: Peter Bently/ Chekkeh
- Violet orangutans: Jack Prelutsky/ Charkhe Falak
- Where the eagle's nest is (from Persian to English) Taraneh Matloub/ Elmi va Farahangi
- Pencil: Allen Ahlberg/ Zaferan
- How do dinosaurs say good night?: Jane Yolen/ Bazi va Andisheh
- Penguin and the pine cone: Salinayoon/ Institute for the Intellectual development of children and young adults
- If I were a book: Jose Jorge Letria/ Elmi va Farhangi
- The velveteen rabbit: Margery Williams/ Chekkeh
- Sleep like a tiger: Bazi va Andisheh -
- I came to school late: Davide Cali/ Ofoq
- Five wishing stars: Treesha Runnels/ Bafarzandan
- Tell me something happy before I go to sleep: Joce Dunbar/ Bazi va Andisheh
- How to train your parents: Pete Johnson/ Houpa
- Good night already: Jory John/ Bazi va Andisheh
- Guess how much I love you: Sam mcbratney/ Bazi va Andisheh
- Bib, Bib, time to sleep: Tod Triply/ Bazi va Andisheh
- Time to for bed, daddy: David Hacket/ Bazi va Andisheh
- The all saw a cat: Brandel Wenzel/ Bazi va Andisheh
- Don't open this book: Andy Lee
- The unbelievable adventures of my summer: David Kali/ Ofoq
- How much I am handsome: Mario Ramos/ Elmi va Farahangi
- How much I am strong: Mario Ramos/ Elmi va Farhangi
- Use your imagination: Nikola O' byrn Auburn/ Elmi va Farhangi
- The wolves: Emily Gravett/ Elmi va Farhangi
- Whisper: Pamala Zagarenski/ Bazi va Andisheh
- The fox in the dark: Alison green/ Elmi va farhangi
- The peace week in Mrs. Fox's class: Eileen Spinelli/ Elmi va Farhangi
- The Fox and the Star: Carolie Bickford-Smith/ Elmi va Farhangi
- The fox: Margaret Wild/ Elmi va Farhangi
- It might be an apple: Shinsuke yoshitake/ Ofoq
- Can I build another me?: Shinsuke yoshitake/ Ofoq
- Get to sleep, Jessie: Libby Gleeson
- Back to bed, Ed: Ebastien Braun/ Elmi va Farhangi
- Enemy: Davide Cali/ Cheshmeh
- I am not a chair: Ross Burach/ Porteghal
- Bedtime for little bears: Tomislav Zlatic/ Bazi va Andisheh
- Little bears go to school: Tomislav Zlatic/ Bazi va Andisheh
- Little bears go shopping: Tomislav Zlatic/ Bazi va Andisheh
- Little bears go on a picnic Tomislav Zlatic/ Bazi va Andisheh
- I need my monster: Amanda Boll/ Behnegar
- Good night, tiger: Knapman Timothy /Bazi va Andisheh
- That bear can't babysit: Ruth Quayle/ Bazi va Andisheh
- May I join your club?: John Kelly/ Porteghal
- The rabbit listened: Cori doerfeld/ Porteghal
- Still stuck: Shinsuke Yoshitake/ Mahak
- How to be a lion?: Ed Vere/ Cheshmeh
- Don't open this book again: Andy Lee/ Porteghal
- Good morning, neighbor: Davide Cali/ Cheshmeh
- The bear with the sword: Davide Cali/ Cheshmeh
- Let me sleep, sheep: Meg mckinlay/ Bazi va Andisheh
- Do not open this book ever: Andi Lee/ Bazi va Andisheh
- Noodlephant: Jacobe Kramer/ Porteghal
- Say something: Peter H Reynolds/ Porteghal
- A funny thing happened on the way to school: Davide Cali/ Ofoq
- A funny thing happened at the Museum: Davide Cali/ Ofoq
- Where bear?: Sophy Henn/ Mahak
- Almost anything: Sophy Henn/ Katabparq
- Don't open this diary: Andi Lee/ Porteghal
- Goodbye friend, hello friend: Cori Doerrfeld
- The boring book: Shinsuke Yoshitake/ Mahak
- Grown-up never do that: Davide Cali/ Ofoq
- Mama robot: Davide Cali/ Cheshmeh
- A stone sat still: Brendan Wenzel/ Porteghal
- Why do I feel like this?: Shinsuke Yoshitake/ Ofoq
- There must be more than that: Shinsuke Yoshitake/ Ofoq
- Up the mountain: Marianne Dubuc/ Bazi va Andisheh
- I won't give up my rubber: Shinsuke Yoshitake/ Ofoq
- I can explain: Shinsuke Yoshitake/ Ofoq
- Baby, Private eye: Brian Selznick/ Ofoq
- The tiny tale of little pea: Davide Cali/ Ofoq
- The I wonder bookstore: Shinsuke Yoshitake/ Ofoq
- Tomorrow I'll be kind (co-author: Asad Sha'bani): Jessica Hische/ Simaye Shargh
- Tomorrow I'll be brave (Co-translator: Asad Sha'bani): Jessica Hische/ Simaye Shargh
- Be a tree: Maria Gianferrari/ Porteghal
- Every child a song: Nicola Davies/ Porteghal
- Little pea's grand journey: Davide Cali/ Ofoq
- The Big orange splot: Daniel Pinkwater/ Kharman
- The happiest lion: Olexandr Shatokin/ Porteghal
- Littlelight: Kelly Canby/ Porteghal
- The shadow elephant: Nadine Robert/ Mehrsa
- I can open it for you: Shinsuke Yoshitake/ Ofoq
- The most important thing: Antonella Abbatiello/ Mehrsa
- Little pea's drawing Class: Davide Cali/ Ofoq
- Ready to Soar: Cori Doerrfeld/Porteghal
- Falling up: Poems and drawing: Shel Silverstein/ Hastan
- Song about Black: Ann McGovern/ Amir Kabir
- Bee: Britta Teckentrup/ Bazi va Andisheh
- Tree: Britta Teckentrup/ Bazi va Andisheh
- Moon: Britta Teckentrup/ Bazi va Andisheh
- Thing: Simon Puttock/ Mehrsa
- The Very Hard Book: Idan Ben- Barrack/ Ofoq
- That's Life: Amy Dyckman/ Porteghal
- I Am a Cat: Galia Bernstein/ Porteghal
- The Journey Home: Frann Preston Gannon/ Mehrsa
- That's not fair: Shinsuke Yushitake/ Ofoq

=== Research ===
- A contrastive analysis of tenses in English and Persian/ Ketabe Bahar

=== Dictionaries and lexicography ===
- "Two dictionaries and one look, A comparative analysis of Mo'aser English-Persian Dictionary (compiled by Dr. Bateni) and Kamangir English-Persian Dictionary, Adineh, No. 101, 1995". This suggests Hirmandi is interested in the technical aspects of lexicography and is able to compare and analyze different dictionaries.
- "A critical essay on Hezareh Dictionary (compiled by Dr. Haghshenas and others), Hayat Newspaper, 27 September 2001". This indicates a continued interest in dictionaries and a willingness to critique existing ones.

=== Film and literature ===
- "The blackboard (directed by Samira Makhmalbaf)!, A journey through two generations, Bahar Newspaper, 26 June 2000"

This article shows an interest in film analysis and a focus on themes of generations and society.

- "Students should know, Bahar Newspaper, 26 July 2000"

This article suggests an interest in education and pedagogy.

- "The art of translating for children, Motarjem Journal, No. 39, Autumn and Winter 2008"

This piece highlights Hirmandi's expertise in translating for children, a specific and challenging aspect of the field.

- "Digging through the impossible, an essay on translating poetry, Rowshanan quarterly, No.8, 2008"

This article demonstrates a deeper interest in literary translation, particularly focusing on the complexities of translating poetry.

- "A paradox called children poetry, The journal of children literatureپژوهشنامه ادبیات کودک No. 14, 2015"

This article explores the unique challenges and characteristics of children's poetry, showcasing a focus on literary analysis. Overall, Hirmandi's publications highlight a scholar who is passionate about language, translation, and literary studies. His work is diverse and engages with various topics, from dictionary analysis to children's literature.

== Major awards ==
- Honorable mention of the FIT Astrid Lindgren prize at the 25th FIT world congress, Geneva, 2025
- IBBY Certificate of Honour, For Ekhtera-e Hugo Cabreh
- Golden Moon for the selected translator (1978-1998) in the Great Festival of Children Literature and Young Adults Literature
- Golden Trophies in three consecutive festivals of artist instructors (2001-2002-2003) Certificates of Appreciation
- 7 Certificates Of Appreciation from the Children's Book Council for different translations.
- Three Certificates And Diplomas Of Honor from the Institute for the Intellectual Development of Children and Young Adults
- Certificate Of Appreciation from Golagha for children Periodical
- Certificate Of Appreciation in the 23rd ceremony of Book of the Year
- Certificate Of Appreciation For The Translation of the Humorous Dictionary

== Other awards ==
- 3 Golden Trophies from Salaam Bacheha Weekly Periodical
- Golden Flying Turtle 2002 for the translation of The Invention of Hugo Cabret (by Brian Selznick)
- CBC's Special Award for the translation of Enemy (by Davide Cali)
- CBC's Special Award for the translation of Can I make Another Me? (by Shinsuke Yoshitake)
- Special Award Of House Of Iranian Artists for a life time impressive translations for children and adults
- Award For The Translations Of Dictionary of Humorous Quotations and The Devil's Dictionary.
