= Seyed Kazem Alavipanah =

Iranian geographer

Seyed Kazem Alavipanah سید کاظم علوی پناه
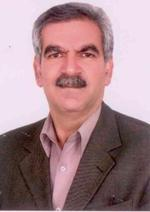
- Born: 1958 (age 67–68); Abarkuh, Yazd, Iran
- Education: Shiraz University; Tarbiat Modares University; Ghent University
- Occupation: Professor at University of Tehran
- Website: Official website Personal website

Seyed Kazem Alavipanah (Persian: سید کاظم علوی پناه; born 1958) is a professor of remote sensing and geographic information system (GIS) at University of Tehran, and current head of Department of Remote Sensing and GIS of University of Tehran.

== Education and career ==
Alavipanah was born in 1958 in Abarkuh, Yazd, Iran. In 1976, he was admitted to the College of Agriculture, Shiraz University, in the field of pedology, and received his BSc in 1983. He commenced his master's degree program in pedology at Tarbiat Modares University, Tehran, in 1988 and graduated in 1991. He received a PhD, from a Belgian University in 1997 in Remote Sensing (RS) and Geographic Information Systems (GIS), minoring in pedology. He was a faculty member at the International Desert Research Center (IDRC), University of Tehran. Still, in 2002, he was moved to the Department of Remote Sensing and GIS, Faculty of Geography. He is now serving as a full professor at the Department of Remote Sensing and GIS, University of Tehran.

== Scientific career ==
Currently, he is a member of a number of international scientific associations, Food and Agriculture Organization of the United Nations (FAO), and an elected member of the Intergovernmental Technical Panel on Soils (ITPS), in charge of preparing World Soil Report and World Soil Charter (2013-2015). He has been endeavoring on a program called ‘Heat as an Indicator of World Intelligence’ and trying to patent it as a theory.

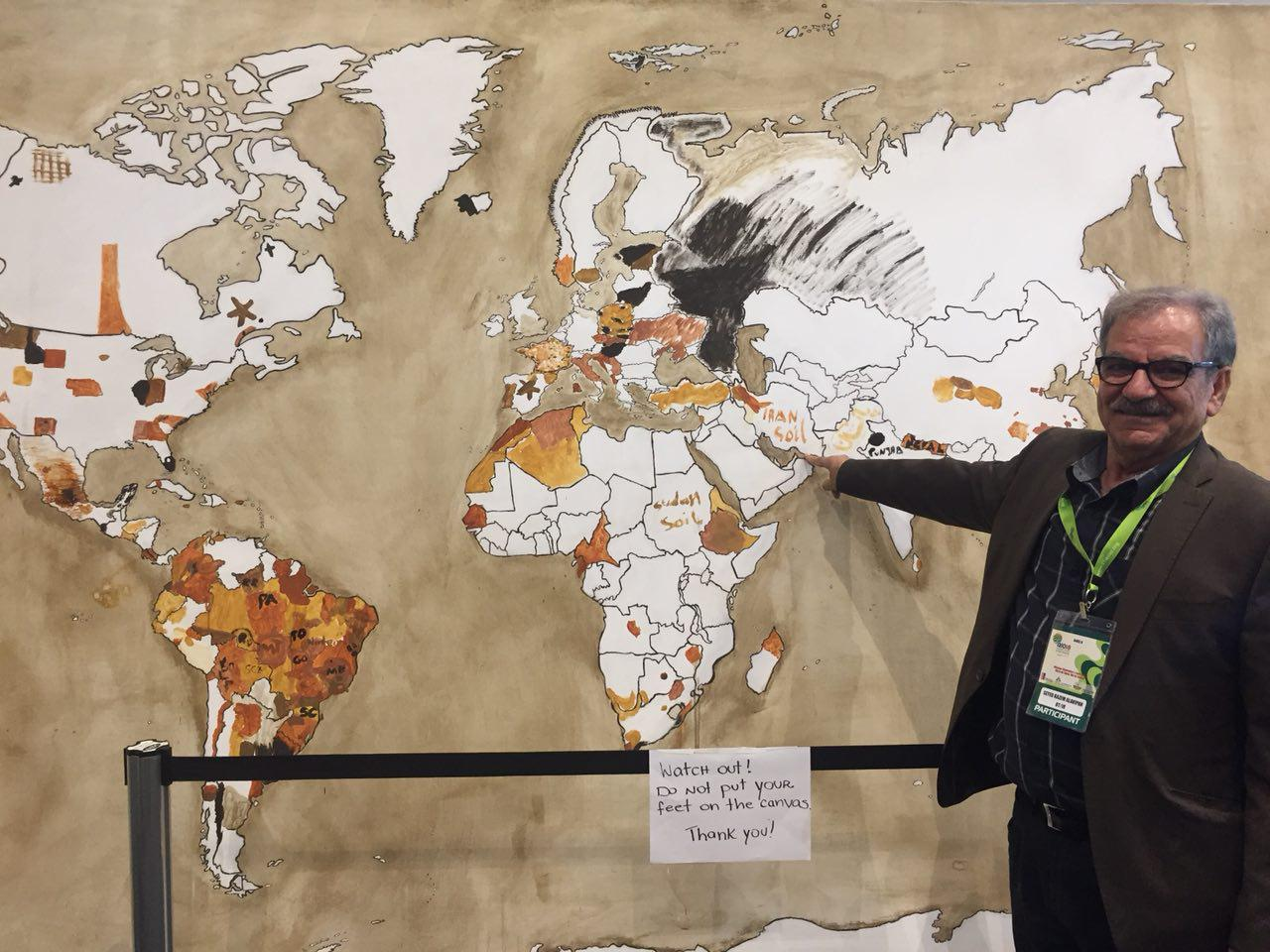
21st World Congress of Soil Science-12 – 17 August 2018 in Rio de Janeiro, Brazil.

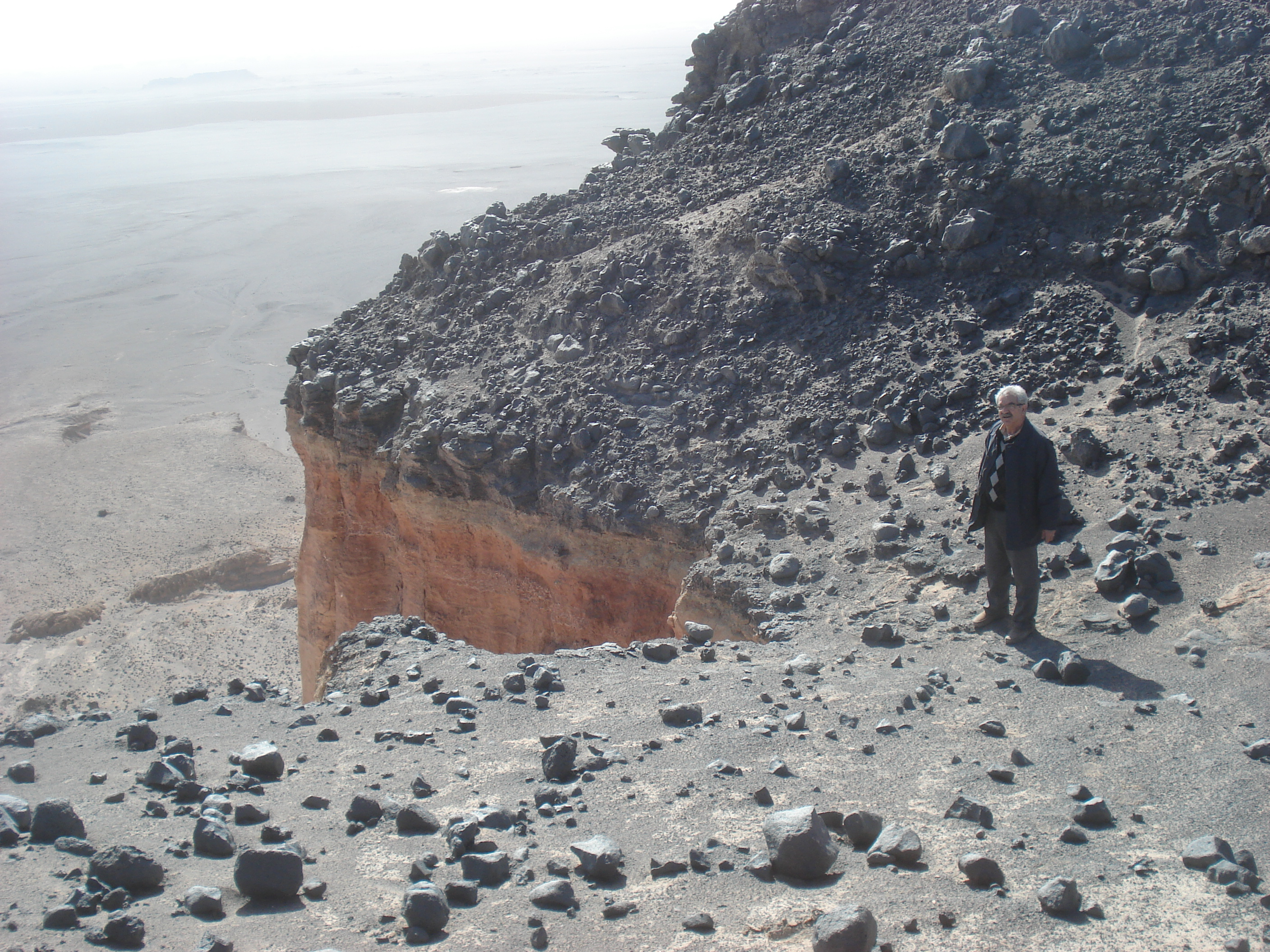
Lut Desert (Iran)

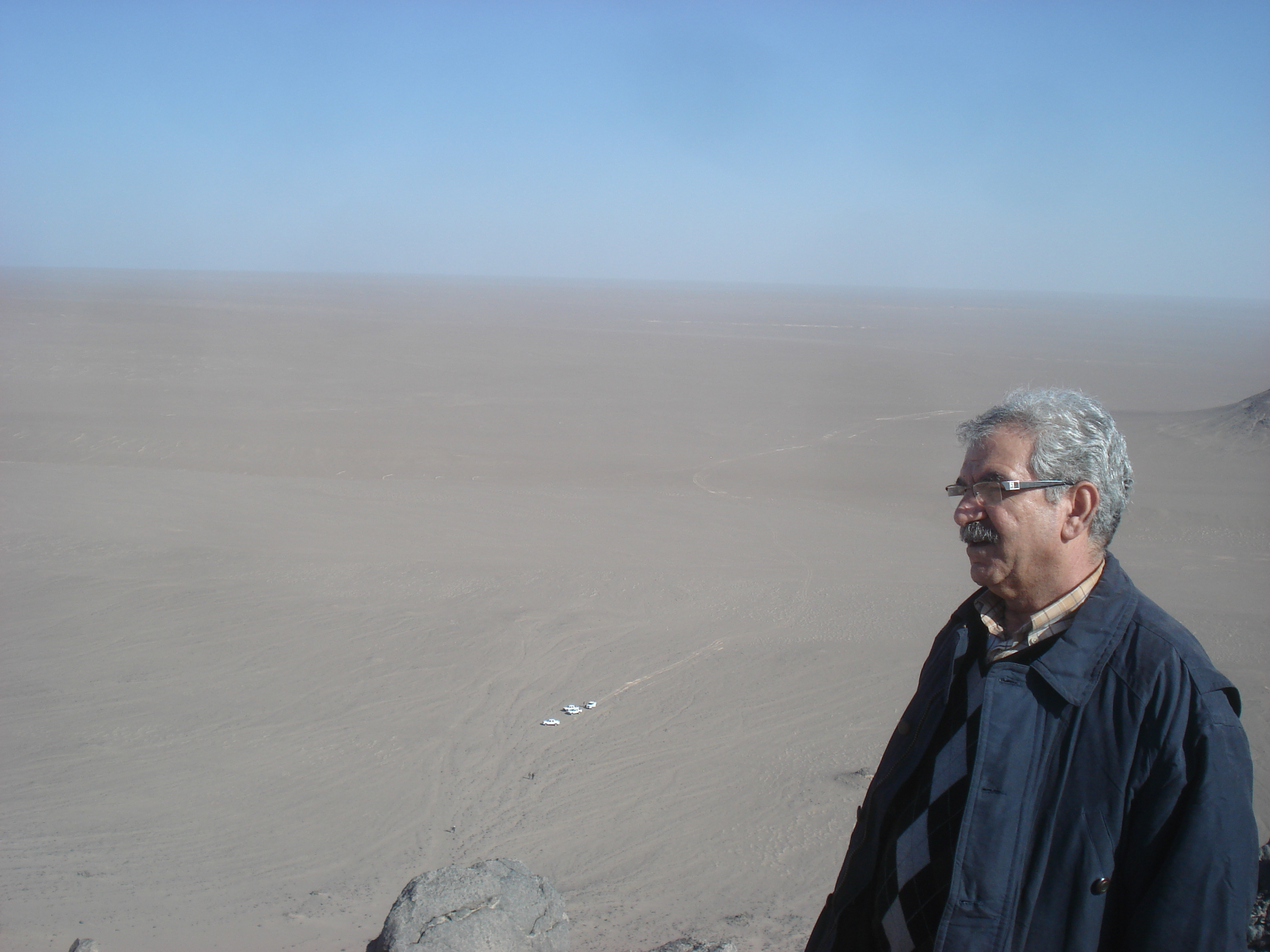
Lut Desert (Iran)

He has received many international awards for his projects, papers, and contribution to RS Conferences. In 2004, he was selected as the Superior Researcher of the University of Tehran; in addition, he was the Select Professor of University of Tehran in 2005 and 2015. He attained Allameh Tabatabai Award from the Iran National Elites Foundation in 2014.

He has published more than 190 papers in noted international journals and conferences. Additionally, he has authored and published the following books: Application of Remote Sensing in the Earth Sciences, Information Technology in the Earth Sciences, Fundamentals of Modern Remote Sensing, Remote Sensing of Soil Salinity, Remote Sensing and Geographic Information System, and Research Methodology in Remote Sensing. His book Thermal Remote Sensing was selected as Superior Academic Textbook and commended by Iran government; this book was also among the University of Tehran's 80 Treasure Books in 2015.
