= Parviz Jabehdar Maralani =

Parviz Jabedar- Maralani
- Born: 1941 (age 84–85); Tabriz, Iran
- Education: University of Tehran (B.S., 1963) University of California, Berkeley (M.S., 1966; PhD, 1969)
- Scientific career
- Fields: Electrical Engineering
- Workplaces: University of Tehran Bell Labs

Parviz Jabehdar Maralani is an Iranian electrical engineering emeritus professor and fellow of the Academy of Sciences of Iran. He has contributed significantly to the education of electrical engineering in Iran and trained many students.

Parviz Jabehdar Maralani, born in 1941 in Tabriz, Iran, is a distinguished electrical engineer and professor emeritus at the University of Tehran. He completed his B.Sc. in Electrical Engineering at the University of Tehran in 1963, graduating first in his class. He then pursued further studies at the University of California, Berkeley, where he earned an M.S. in 1966 and a Ph.D. in Electrical and Computer Engineering in 1969. After completing his doctoral studies, Dr. Jabehdar Maralani worked as a Member of Technical Staff at Bell Labs in Holmdel, New Jersey, from 1969 to 1970. He then returned to Iran and joined the Faculty of Engineering at the University of Tehran in 1970, where he later became a distinguished professor and, eventually, professor emeritus.

Throughout his career, Dr. Jabehdar Maralani has made significant contributions to electrical engineering education in Iran, mentoring numerous students who have themselves become prominent engineers and academics. He has authored 14 books, 40 journal articles, and 80 conference papers, reflecting his extensive research and expertise in the field.

In addition to his academic work, he has held several major administrative positions, including serving as Chairman of the Department of Electrical and Computer Engineering at the University of Tehran. He was also a member of the founding team for the Iranian Universities Scientific Olympiad and played a pivotal role in developing the Electrical Engineering Olympiad in 1994.

Dr. Jabehdar Maralani's achievements have been recognized with numerous awards, such as the Distinguished Achievement Award at the 6th Biannual World Automation Congress in 2004 and the Golden Certificate from the Iranian Association of Electrical and Electronic Engineers in 2003. He was also honored as one of Iran's Eternal Figures (Chehreh-ye Mandegar) in Electrical Engineering in 2002.

His research interests encompass various aspects of electrical engineering, including control systems, networked control systems, and the application of wavelets in system identification and control design. His work has been published in reputable journals and conferences, contributing significantly to advancements in these areas.

== Biography ==
Jabedar was born in Tabriz in 1941. He received his B.S. and M.S. degrees in Electrical Engineering From Tehran University (1959-1963), his M.S. degree in Electrical And Computer Engineering from University of California, Berkeley (1965-1966), and his PhD degree in Electrical And Computer Engineering, from University of California, Berkeley (1966-1969). He joined the Faculty of Engineering of the University of Tehran in 1970 where he became distinguished professor later and emeritus professor. Besides his research work, he has contributed significantly to the engineering education of electrical engineering in Iran. Many of prominent Iranian electrical engineers and professors have been his students or students of his students, including the late Caro Lucas, Babak Araabi.

== Achievements ==
He is the author of 14 Books, 40 Journal articles, and 80 Conference papers.

Major Administrative Positions: Chairman of The Department of Electrical and Computer Engineering, University of Tehran.

Major Memberships: Member of Technical Staff (1969-1970) Bell labs, Holmdel NJ, USA.

Member of the Founding Team of Iranian Universities scientific Olympiad and responsible for Developing the Electrical Engineering Olympiad (1994).

Member of Founding Team for Science and Defence Technology (Malek-Ashtar) university in Shahinshahr, Iran, and responsible for Planning the Department of Electrical at this University (1981).

Member of Editorial Board of 6 Scientific and Research Journals.

Awards: Award of the outstanding alumni of the university of Tehran in its 70th anniversary (Dec 2004).

Distinguished Achievement Award of the 6th Biannual World Automation congress in recognition of outstanding contributions to control systems, Motivational Mentorship of Young Engineers and Scientists and Publication of important Textbook, Seville Spain (28 Jun 2004).

Winner of the golden certificate and the award of the Iranian Association of Electrical and Electronic Engineers(IAEEE) for a distinct and continued work of excellent teaching and research (May 2003).

Distinguished professor of the faculty of Engineering 1994 for the excellence of teaching and Research.

Distinguished Professor of the University of Tehran for the excellence of Teaching, Research and Administration (1992).

Winner of the award of the best published textbook in the country for the best translation of the book: "Computer Method for Circuit Analysis and Design" (1992).

Winner of the award for publishing the best textbook in the year in Tehran university Publication (i.e. computer Methods for Circuit Analysis and Design) (1992).

Winner of the award for publishing the best textbook in Tehran university publication during the decade 1979-1989 i.e. Signals and System.

Initiation of PhD program in the Electrical Engineering Department at the University of Tehran (1988).

Winner of the Award for the best published textbook in the country for the best translation of book: "Modern control Engineering" (1987).

First Rank Graduate of the University of Tehran in 1963 and winner of the award of PhD Scholarship in US.

Selected as an Eternal Figures (Chehreh ye Mandegar) in Electrical Engineering in 2002.

== Selected publications ==
- S. Afkhami, P.Jabedar-Maralani, M. Yazdanpanah,"Stabilization and improvement of performance by extension of universal formula in the presence of disturbance"IEE Volume 152, Issue 2 of the CTA journal, Apr. 2005
- Karimi H.R., Lohmann B., Jabedar-Maralani P. and Moshiri B.: A Wavelet-Based Approach For Optimal Control of Second-order Linear Systems in Time Domain. International Journal of Dynamical and Control Systems, Vol. 11, No. 2, pp 237–252, Apr. 2005
- H.R. Karimi, P. Jabehdar-Maralani, B. Moshiri, B. Lohmann, "Numerically efficient approximation to the optimal control of singular systems based on Haar wavelets" International Journal of Computer Mathematics Vol. 82, No. 4, pp 495–507, Apr. 2005
- Y. Koolivand, O Shoaei, A Zahabi, P. Jabehdar-Maralani," A complete analysis of noise in inductively source degenerated CMOS LAN's"IEICE Electronics Express, Vol.2 No. 1 pp 1-7, Jan. 2005
- H.R. Karimi, B.Lohmann, P. Jabehdar-Maralani, B. Moshiri, "A computational method for parameter estimation of linear systems using Haar wavelets" International Journal of Computer Mathematics 81 (9), pp 1121–1132, 2004
- B. Labibi, B. Lohmann, A. K. Sedigh and P. Jabehdar-Maralani, "Decentralized Stabilization of Large-Scale Systems via State feedback using descriptor Systems", IEEE Transactions on System, Man, and Cybernetics Vol. 33, no. 6, pp 771–776, Nov. 2003
- P. Jabehdar-Maralani, "Optimal size studies of domestic Communication networks" MM-70-3411-3, Bell Labs Technical Memo, 1970
- P. Jabehdar-Maralani "A study of optimal structures for domestic communication networks", MM-70-3411-2, Bell Labs, Technical Memo,1970
- P. Jabehdar-Maralani, "Network sensitivity with regard to estimated link length", MM70-3212-1, Bell Labs. Technical Memo, 1970
- P. Jabehdar-Maralani, "Installation deferral in Communication networks", MM69-3212-5, Bell Labs. Technical Memo, 1969
- H. Frank, P. Jabehdar-Maralani, "A note on minimal transformerless realization of RLC networks", IEEE Trans. on Circuit Theory, CT-16, pp 94–96, 1969

== See also ==
- Modern Iranian scientists, scholars, and engineers
- Tehran University
