= Mostafa Azkia =

Iranian sociologist (b. 1941)

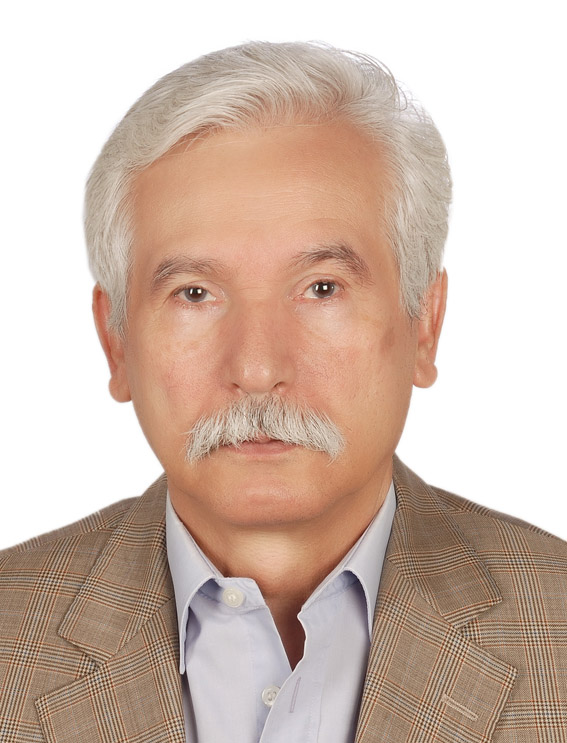
- Born: 1941 (age 84–85); Imperial State of Iran

Academic work
- Discipline: Sociology
- Sub-discipline: Iranian Rural Development
- Institutions: University of Tehran

Mostafa Azkia (Persian: مصطفی ازکیا; born 24 April 1941) is an Iranian sociologist. Azkia is a major figure in the study of Iranian rural development. He is a professor of sociology at the University of Tehran.. He is the author and translator of about 20 books. His chapter in Twenty Years of Islamic Revolution: Political and Social Transition in Iran since 1979 edited by Eric Hooglan, titled Rural Society and Revolution in Iran is considered to be seminal work in this area. He is considered to be one of the founding fathers of rural development studies in Iran.

== Early life ==
He was born into a middle-class family in Tehran. His father worked for the Iranian ministry of Post, telegram, and telephone. He spent most of his youth in Tehran inspiring to be a medical doctor. However, due to an error in the university entrance exams, he was accepted into the Faculty of Sociology at Tehran University in 1960. In the following year, he was also accepted at the Faculty of Law and studied both programs simultaneously. However, he was forced to discontinue studying law in 1962 due to a law that was introduced which prohibited students from studying multiple degrees.

== Education ==
He obtained a Master's degree in sociology in 1966. After 11 years of research he was granted a sabbatical which he used to obtain a PhD in sociology from Aberdeen University in 1980.

== Career ==
After obtaining this Bachelor's degree, Azkia took a part-time research position at the Institute for Social Studies & Research in Tehran in 1966. He took an interest in Iranian rural development and began conducting research in this area 196in 8.

In 2002, he was invited to give a keynote at St. Antony's College, Oxford university at the Middle East Centre. Azkia outlined the effects that revolution has had regarding social and rural development. Papers presented were later published as a book titled Twenty Years of Islamic Revolution Political and Social Transition in Iran since 1979.

In 2012, he delivered another keynote at the Center for Middle Eastern Studies at Lund University in Sweden outlining the agricultural impacts of Iranian rural society. In 2021, Azkia and co-author Rashid Ahmadifar won the best academic book prize at the 3rd National Festival of Academic Publishing for their book, Theories of Development.

During his 30 years of research he has published 60 articles and 12 books in this area. Most of the books he has written or translated (to Persian) are related to Iran's rural sociology and idealistic of development and growth

== Selected publications ==
=== Books ===
Azkia, M. (1986). Sociology of rural development and underdevelopment of Iranian rural society [in Persian]. Tehran: Entesharat-e Ettlaat.

Azkia, M., & Ahmadifar, G. (2020). Theories of Development [in Persian]. Tehran: Andishe Ehsan.

Azkia, M., & Ghafari, G. (2001). Sociology of development. Tehran: Keyhan.

=== Book Chapter ===
Azkia, M. (2002). Rural society and revolution in Iran. Twenty Years of Islamic Revolution Political and Social Transition in Iran since 1979, 1979, 96-119.

=== Articles ===
Azkia, M. (1997). Modernization theory in a tribal‐peasant society of Southern Iran, Critique: Critical Middle Eastern Studies, 6:10, 77-90, DOI: 10.1080/10669929708720101

Azkia, M. & Hooglund, E. (2002). Research Note on Pastoral Nomadism in Post-revolution Iran, Critique: Critical Middle Eastern Studies, 11:1, 109-114, DOI: 10.1080/10669920120122270

Azkia, M. (2002). Development sociology and rural underdevelopment in Iran. Teharan, 28, 12-18.

Azkia, M (2005). Poverty, Vulnerability and Development: Case Study of the Garmsar and Dasht-e Azadegan Villages, Critique: Critical Middle Eastern Studies, 14:1, 109-125, DOI: 10.1080/10669920500057187

Azkia, M. & Firouzabadi, A. (2006). The Role of Social Capital in the Creation of Rural Production Associations: A Case Study of the Karkheh Dam Watershed Basin, Critique: Critical Middle Eastern Studies, 15:3, 295-315, DOI: 10.1080/10669920600997183
