= Syed Rahim Moshiri =

Iranian professor of human geography

Syed Rahim Moshiri سید رحیم مشیری
- Born: 11 April 1930 (age 96); Semnan, Iran
- Education: University of Freiburg Germany
- Occupations: Director of Professional University, producer
- Years active: 2010–2014
- Awards: Professor of the country in 1985

Syed Rahim Moshiri (Persian: سید رحیم مشیری; born April 11, 1930) was an Iranian geographer. He worked as a professor of human geography and physical geography at Tehran University.

== Early life ==
Syed Rahim Moshiri was born on April 11, 1930, in Semnan, Iran. As a child, he attended elementary school at Hedayat School in Semnan. He attended fifth grade at Pahlavi and Dehkhoda High School. He attended sixth grade at Mirafzali High School. His high school as Pahlavi and Dehkhoda. He began his undergraduate studies at Tehran University in 1953. Dr Moshiri earned his PhD in geography from University of Freiburg in Germany in 1966.

== Career ==
Until 1967, Moshiri worked as an assistant professor of geography at the University of Freiburg. In 1967, he returned to Iran and joined the Faculty of Geography at Tehran University as an Assistant Professor. He became an Associate Professor in 1975 and later was elevated to a Full Professor at Tehran University in 1993.

In 2006 Moshiri was recognized as one of Iran's leading professors. Moshiri taught students at all levels while serving on numerous committees at the Tehran University. He was responsible for the executive and financial management of the Faculty of Literature and Human Science, and he also sat on the board of the Geography department. Moreover, he was the director of the Institute of Geography at Tehran University. He also contributed to the development of Tehran University.

=== Islamic Azad University ===
Syed Rahim Moshiri was the director of the professional department of Islamic Azad University, Moshiri was responsible for overseeing the geography department.

=== Other activities ===
He was a member of the committee on planning of geography at the headquarters of the Cultural Revolution. He served as actuary of the seventh congress of Iranian Geographic. He was the Director of the masters program of geography at Tabarestan University in Chalus.

He supervised more than 30 PhD theses at Tehran University Islamic Azad University and more than 200 masters' theses in various universities. He worked as an associate member of the Academy of Sciences of the Islamic Republic of Iran since 1970 and was director of the Academy of Geography. He died at the age of 85 in 2014.

== Publications ==
Moshiri has authored or supported books, articles, and lectures.

1. Geography of nomadism, Tehran: SAMT publication (2006) as cited in
2. Generalities of continents, Ghoghnus, 1993
3. Political and economic geography, Military College
4. Introduction to the economy of nomadism
5. Theology and scientific search techniques in human science with an emphasis on geography, Dr. Asayesh, and Dr. Moshiri, Ghoomes Publishing.
