= Center for Hellenic Studies in Greece, Harvard University =

Greek-based Harvard research center

Coordinates: 37.567180°N 22.796628°E

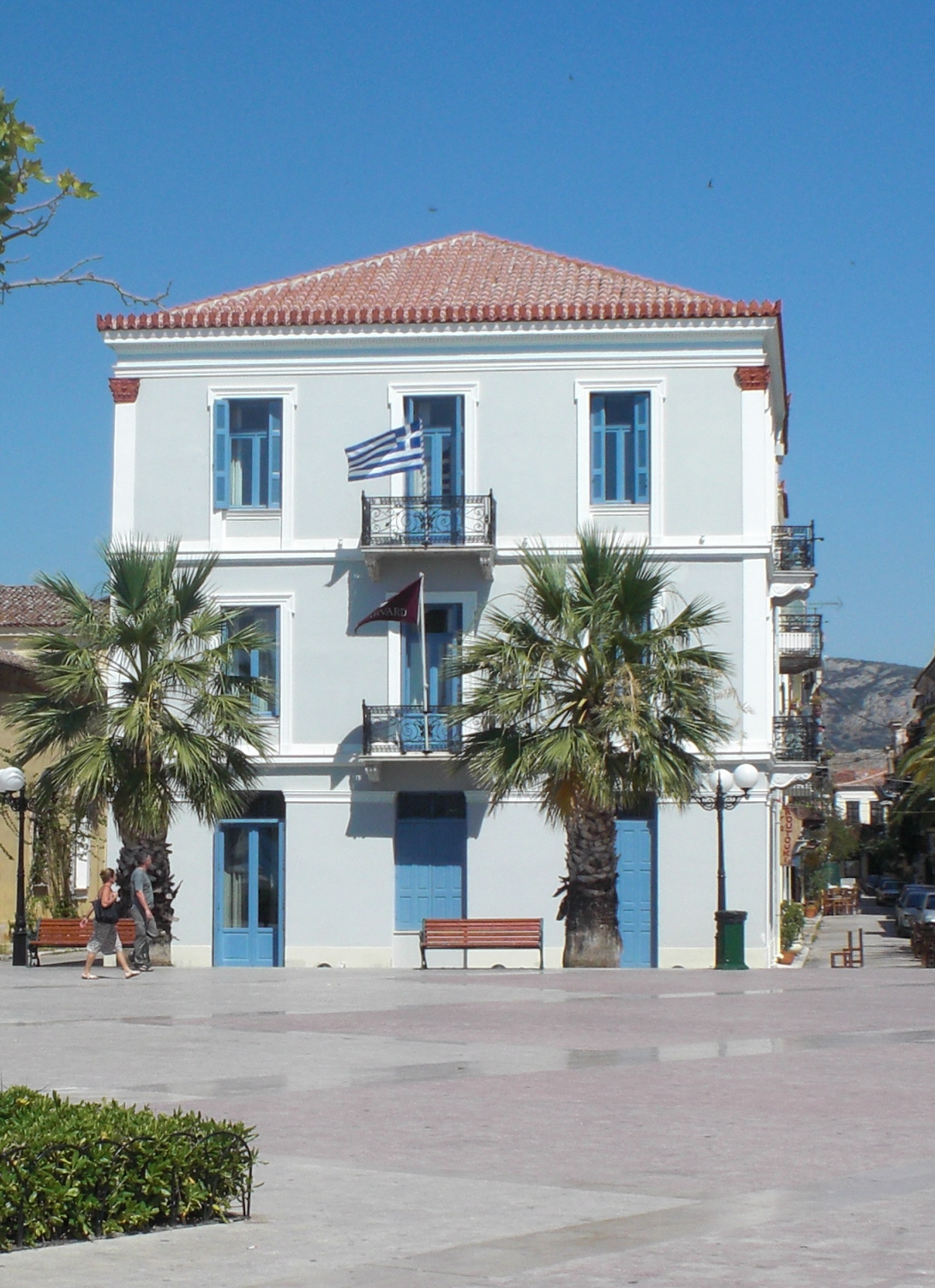
Center for Hellenic Studies in Greece

The Center for Hellenic Studies in Greece (CHS Greece) is a Harvard research center based in Nafplio, Greece. A twin institution to its counterpart Harvard University's Center for Hellenic Studies in Washington, D.C., CHS GR is housed in the Iatrou building, formerly home to the municipal town hall of Nafplio, at Philhellene and King Othon Street. CHS Greece is administered by a joint American and Greek Executive Board and managed by Christos Giannopoulos.

== History ==
The Center for Hellenic Studies in Greece was inaugurated in 2008 via joint decision between the Provost and the Dean of the Harvard Faculty of Arts and Sciences. CHS Greece utilizes the knowledge and expertise of Harvard's faculty and research centers and is a part of Harvard's continuing effort to expand its international presence. The Center serves as a nexus for the network of international Centers operated by Harvard in Europe and around the globe, and it was organized and developed by being accessible, and free of charge, to the general public.

From a geographical standpoint Nafplio's role in the shaping of modern Greece and its enduring cultural significance make it an opportune setting for Harvard students as well as for visitors from Greece and across the globe. Nafplio neighbors many archaeological sites in Greece such as Mycenae, Mystras, Epidaurus, Olympia, Tiryns, etc. Nafplio was the first capital of modern Greece after independence and a port during the Mycenean period.

== Digital Library ==
The Center for Hellenic Studies's facility in Nafplio has been equipped with a Digital Library which provides access to Harvard Library's electronic resources and a number of additional databases. Access is open to all researchers of the Center, regardless of affiliation.

== Programs ==
The Center for Hellenic Studies offers a wide range of activities and opportunities to high school and university students, faculty, alumni, researchers, life-long learners, and also administrators and other professionals from Harvard as well as other academic institutions all over the world. CHS Greece programs and activities are offered for free and some of them are organized with other Harvard and non-Harvard entities.

CHS headquarters in Nafplio, and its affiliated locations throughout Greece have become centers of cultural exchange. Throughout the year, they host part and co-host initiatives such as these:

- Seminar-based Programs
- Research Opportunities
- Internships
- Workshop Series
- Travel Study Programs

== Events and Activities ==
The Center for Hellenic Studies in Greece, though it prioritizes programs directed to the Harvard and Greek educational communities, it also offers a large number of events & other Initiatives, including symposia, conferences, events, introductory programs to the CHS Greece digital library, online resources from CHS, etc. These initiatives are addressed to Greek and international audiences and many of them are based on important synergies developed by the Center or based on proposals for collaborations by other institutions.

- Events Series
- Hellenic Studies Folios Series
- Digital Resources for Knowledge
- 1821–2021 CHS Initiatives in Greece and in the US
- Conferences & Symposia
- CHS Greece at Harvard
- More Initiatives
