= Barkat Ventures =

Iranian institute

Barakat Ventures
- Company type: Scientific-research foundation
- Industry: Knowledge-based economy
- Headquarters: Tehran, Islamic Republic of Iran
- Area served: Iran-- Tehran; also, activities in the provinces were put on the agenda from 2019. For this, the provinces of Khuzestan, Sistan and Baluchistan, Chaharmahal and Bakhtiari, Lorestan, Kermanshah, Kerman, Kurdistan Khorasan Razavi and West Azerbaijan were selected.
- Products: To create/expand on the ecosystem/infrastructure (for the development of science/knowledge-based activities)
- Website: barkatventures.com

Barkat Ventures (Persian: مؤسسه دانش‌بنیان برکت) is an Iranian knowledge-based institute which has been established as the arm of the Imam (Khomeini)'s Command's Executive in order to develop a knowledge-based economy. This institute's mission is to create and expand on the ecosystem/infrastructure for the development of science and knowledge-based activities of the scholars in Iran on the basis of Islamic-Iranian models by utilizing Iranian scientists, experts, global-experience, knowledge, and so on.

Barkat Ventures is considered as one of the five executive lever of Barakat Foundation, which works in the field of new knowledge-based technologies. This institute is affiliated with the "Barakat Foundation", and its manager is Saeed-Jafari.

== Reason For Establishment ==
According to "Hamidreza Amirinia" the advisor to the Chief of Execution of Imam Khomeini's Order: the reason for establishing this institute is to realize the knowledge-based economy in all sectors and support it. He also said:

Execution of Imam Khomeini's Order (Setad) had/has special attention to knowledge-based companies in recent years; For the sake of this reason, the "Barkat-Ventures" was established as "the fourth pillar" of the Executive Headquarters of the Imam. Significant works have been done by paying heed to the subject of technology, particularly the field of "IT" and cyberspace. The head advisor of the setad added: "Till now, 600 projects have been reviewed in the Setad, of which 50 projects of them have been invested."

== Activities ==
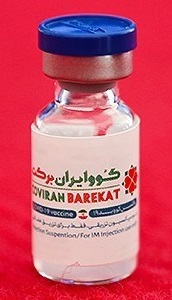
COVIran Barakat, made by Barakat

The first COVID-19 vaccine produced by Iranian researchers has been produced by Barakat. The human-injection of the first phase of clinical studies of the Iranian corona vaccine was performed on December 29, 2020; The initial phase of human-testing for this vaccine started with the injection for 56 volunteers. The second group of the volunteers was also injected with the vaccine. According to the head of the vaccine production team at the Setad, the results show that this vaccine also neutralizes the British mutated COVID-19 virus.

Barkat Ventures has also commenced supporting and investing in the production of oxygen generators for corona-patients.

In May 2022, a specialized skill-based training platform was launched by the Barkat Ventures, offering educational courses and interest-free loans to reduce unemployment among university graduates.

=== Memorandum of Understanding ===
According to the head of the research and laboratory network of the Islamic Azad University, a memorandum of understanding was signed with the Barakat Knowledge-Based Institute (Barkat Ventures) in order to set up technology and innovation development centers in border and low-income areas in order to develop knowledge-based employment and export knowledge-based products.

== See also ==
- Barkat Pharmaceutical Group
