= 4030 Call System =

Iranian telephone system

- Native name: سامانه تلفنی 4030
- Company type: Telephone system
- Founded: February 27, 2020; 6 years ago
- Founders: Execution of Imam Khomeini's Order
- Headquarters: Tehran, Iran
- Area served: Throughout Iran
- Key people: Seyyed Reza Mazhari (chief)
- Products: Answering questions related to COVID-19 (corona-screening)
- Owner: Barakat Tel; (Barakat Pharmaceutical Group)
- Number of employees: 2,200 doctors and paramedics (and 2,000 telephone lines)
- Website: https://call4030.ir/

The 4030 Call System (Persian: سامانه تلفنی ۴۰۳۰) briefly "4030-system" is the Iranian telephone system that was created during the early days of the COVID-19 pandemic in Iran for expert consulting and corona-screening (of coronavirus suspects). There are 2000 phone lines and 2,200 doctors and paramedics throughout Iran who are working at this call system, and answer questions related to COVID-19.

4030 call system has been launched by the Execution of Imam Khomeini's Order (Barakat Tel) and in cooperation with the Ministry of Health and Medical Education and Iran Telecommunication in order to screen Iranian families at the field of COVID-19.

As of September 2020, more than 20 million calls have been made to the telephone system (4030). Iran's Head of 4030 call system, Reza Mazhari, stated the telephone line receives diverse calls daily, and with both medical and psychological inquiries. According to Mazhari, 40 percent of these questions were related to people's anxiety about COVID-19, and 40 percent were for increasing the awareness regarding the novel virus. He said that this system could decrease the number of people who go to the hospital.

== Services ==
Among the services of the 4030 Call System are:

- For expert consulting and corona-screening (of coronavirus suspects)
- Answering questions and advising "pregnant and postpartum mothers".
- Phone nutrition consultation
- Providing psychological emergency services for suicide prevention
- Providing counseling services to prevent abortion and referring individuals in need to the Barakat Foundation.

Etc.

== 4030 hotline in the 2025 Israel-Iran crisis ==
During the 12-day conflict between Israel and Iran, the Red Crescent's 4030 hotline, operated in collaboration with the Iranian Red Crescent Society, managed 90,174 calls with the assistance of 1,377 volunteer counselors (465 of whom were online). With an average wait time of 2 minutes and 5 seconds, the hotline directly answered 17,866 calls while automatically processing an additional 12,224 through its IVR system. These free psychological support services, particularly aimed at vulnerable groups, played a crucial role in alleviating mental stress and reducing unnecessary visits to medical centers during the crisis.

== See also ==
- Barakat Pharmaceutical Group
- Telecommunication Company of Iran
- Execution of Imam Khomeini's Order
- Ministry of Health and Medical Education
- COVIran Barakat
