= Execution of Imam Khomeini's Order =

Iranian parastatal organization

- Native name: ستاد اجرایی فرمان امام
- Type: Headquarters
- Founded: April 26, 1989; 37 years ago
- Founders: Habibollah Asgaroladi; Mehdi Karroubi; Hassan Sane'i
- Headquarters: Tehran, Iran
- Key people: Parviz Fattah (CEO)
- Website: setad.ir

The Execution of Imam Khomeini's Order (EIKO; Persian: ستاد اجرایی فرمان امام, Setâd-e Ejrây-ye Farmân-e Emâm), also known as the Executive Headquarters of Imam's Directive or simply Setad, is a parastatal organization in the Islamic Republic of Iran, under direct control of the Supreme Leader of Iran. It was created from thousands of properties confiscated in the aftermath of the 1979 Islamic Revolution. Its holdings include large amounts of real estate and 37 companies, covering nearly every sector of Iranian industry, including finance, oil, and telecommunications.

While its accounts are secret even to the Iranian parliament, a 2013 estimate by Reuters news agency put the total value of Setad's holdings at $95 billion, made up of about $52 billion in real estate and $43 billion in corporate holdings. In 2013, the U.S. Department of the Treasury imposed sanctions on the organization and some of its corporate holdings, referring to it as "a massive network of front companies hiding assets on behalf of ... Iran's leadership."

== History ==
The organization was launched on April 26, 1989, when the first Supreme Leader of Iran, Ruhollah Khomeini, ordered his aides to manage, maintain or sell properties confiscated or supposedly abandoned after the 1979 Islamic Revolution. (Note: Reuters states that "The order directed two aides to sell and manage properties", but the text in Persian at imam-khomeini.ir indicates there were three people addressed by the order, namely: Habibollah Asgaroladi, Mehdi Karroubi and Hassan Sane'i) The order called for the implementation of Article 49 of Constitution of Iran under which the government had the right to confiscate all wealth accumulated through illegal means, restore it to its "legitimate owners"; and if those owners could not be identified, entrust it "to the public treasury".

Habibollah Asgaroladi, Mehdi Karroubi and Hassan Sane'i were appointed to take over all "sales, servicing and managing" of assets of unknown ownership. The assets were to go to seven bonyads and charities specified by Khomeini, such as the Foundation of Martyrs and Veterans Affairs, State Welfare Organization of Iran. The money would be used to aid "families of the martyrs, veterans, the missing, prisoners of war and the downtrodden." According to Reuters, one of the three co-founders of Setad, Mehdi Karoubi, wrote in 2009 that the organization was intended "to operate for no more than two years".

Khomeini died about a month later. The organization did not disband but developed over the next two decades into a vast parastatal known as the Setad Ejraiye Farmane Hazrate Emam - Headquarters for Executing the Order of the Imam. According to Reuters, the organization has engaged in the systematic seizure of thousands of properties belonging to ordinary Iranians, religious minorities, business people and Iranians living abroad.

In 2006, as the United Nations and Western powers began to impose increasingly harsh economic sanctions on Iran, the task force began studying how some developing economies managed to grow so rapidly. The task force concluded that what Iran lacked and needed were conglomerates on par with South Korea, Japan, Brazil, and the United States.

In 2013, as the West pressured Iran's economy with sanctions related to its nuclear development program, the headquarters' extensive economic operations provided the Islamic Republic with an independent source of revenue.

=== Leadership ===
Mohammad Shariatmadari was appointed as the leader of Setad by order of Ali Khamenei in 1994. Iranians who have served in the running or overseeing of Setad include Mohammad Javad Iravani, who took over as head of Setad in 1997, and Mohammad Mokhber, who became the CEO in 2007. Hossein-Ali Nayyeri (until 2023) and Kazem Najafi Elmi (until 2014) were members of the Board of Trustees of Execution of Imam Khomeini's Order. In 2009, Mohammad Saeedikia, a former Iranian minister of housing and urban development, was named chairman of the Setad subsidiary Tadbir Construction Development Group. Aref Norozi served on the board of Tadbir Investment and was head of Setad's real-estate division. From 2013, Ali Ashraf Afkhami was the head of the Tadbir Economic Development Group. Mohammad Reyshahri, a former intelligence minister, was chairman of Rey Investment Co, appointed by Khamenei.

In 2021, the Board of Trustees of the Execution of Imam Khomeini's Order elected Aref Norouzi as head of the executive staff.

The current head is Parviz Fattah.

== Organization ==
Setad consists of two main foundations: the Barakat Foundation that "has the duty of eliminating poverty and empowering poor communities" and Tadbir Economic Development Group to "set up an investment management firm".

=== Barakat Foundation ===
On 11 December 2007, based on the sentence of the second Supreme Leader, Ali Khamenei, "I'm concerned about solving problems of the deprived classes of the society. For instance, solve problems of 1000 villages completely. How good would it be if 1000 points of the country are solved or 1000 schools are built in the country", the Barakat Foundation has been established to solve the problems of in needed people and make habitable the deprived region where poor people live.

The Mechanism of Barakat Foundation is summarized in eight steps. First, the region to implement the Poverty Reduction Project is selected. Then, by choosing the consultant (or experts) and holding meetings, studies on the status of capacities of development at the target area and on the basis of the formulation and implementation of the plan, it is considered as the agenda. After completing the establishment mechanism for implementing the plan and ways for Financing support and education steps, the project begins to operate economically. After the evaluation and documentation of the process of carrying out the project, the Barakat Foundation will be removed from the implementation process. Finally, the project is donated to people for economic activity.

This process was called Sunshine, in order to reduce poverty through the participation of local communities. The Foundation has mainly concentrated on the entrepreneurship of needy people.

=== Tadbir Economic Development Group ===
Ten years after establishing EIKO, Tadbir Economic Development Group was founded as the economic group of EIKO. Now it is a stockholder of many oil and non-oil companies.

== Services ==
EIKO (also known as Setad) has invested 84 trillion Rials in alleviating poverty since December 2007. The foundation has created 322 economic entrepreneurship projects, providing job opportunities for 198,000 people.

It has built 1,030 schools, with 8,000 classrooms (setting up a contract to construct 1,357 schools) in the deprived regions has turned Setad as an organization to prepare the educational facility for the poor student. Construction home for low-income (11,000 homes) and investing in 110 civil infrastructure projects included water and power supply, road construction, building of cultural and religious accommodation in poor regions of the country (800 Mosques, Prayer Rooms (Mosalla), and residence for religious teachers in remote rural regions, and also constructed centers for religious educations are other efforts of the Barakat Foundation.

It has established 4 centers for Cancer Recognition & Treatment, along with 11 hospitals, and 153 Health Care Centers in poor regions around the country, Cure the Infertility of young and treat 273 young couples to elimination the infertility are the important actions of Setad to prepare cure services. Also, this organization tries to fight deforestation in Iran, especially in southern provinces like Khuzestan Province, Ilam Province and gardens and Urban Green Space.

During the 2019 Iran floods, in order to help to flood-stricken people, EIKO prepared essential equipment for flood-stricken people and furnished facilities (fridges, washing machines, carpets, and other necessary elements) for 15,000 families. It provided 4,000 cattle to replace 9,000 killed by the flood, for families living in villages. Some temporary clinics have been established to cure wounded and give medicine. The Barakat Foundation performed most of aids as the representative of EIKO. In other hands, the organization ensured, EIKO will be able to "provide some 3,000 job opportunities" for citizens.

The polypill, drugs to lower blood pressure, is produced in Iran by the support of EIKO was designed 14 years ago and called "PolyIran". According to the study was conducted by doctors from Tehran University, the University of Birmingham in Britain and other institutions and published by The Lancet, it worked quite well in a new study, slashing the rate of heart attacks by more than half among those who regularly took the pills. The pill in the study, which involved the participation of 6,800 rural villagers aged 50 to 75 in Iran, contained a cholesterol-lowering statin, two blood-pressure drugs and a low-dose aspirin.

"Execution of Imam Khomeini's Order" has also done other services for needy people, such as: the distribution of 2,000 dowries and 1,000 stationery packages for poor people, giving 3,000 wheelchairs to needy disabled individuals, preparing 2,000 food packages for Nikshahr students who were involved in nutritional problems, the establishment of "Ehsan Sports places" in deprived areas, and so on.

Execution of Imam Khomeini's Order and the Barakat Foundation (in cooperation with the Ministry of Health) have pursued/implemented the issue of Telehealth. According to the minister of Health, Saeed Namaki: "... This great scientific work helps us in order to utilize a tool called "telemedicine" in these (far) areas of the country. This new approach (telemedicine) allows us to increase productivity in Islamic Republic of Iran's specialized manpower and have health justice in the farthest areas of Iran. He also added, "it began in the farthest and most deprived parts of the country."

=== COVID-19 pandemic ===
According to the Tasnim news agency, Southwest Asia's largest factory producing face masks in Iran was opened by Mohammad Mokhber, director of the Headquarters for Execution of Imam Khomeini's Order in April 2020. The factory is able to "produce 4 million masks per month". According to the report of EIKO's officials, the EIKO has provided several medical facilities to fight with the coronavirus pandemic in Iran, including " 25 million three-layered and N95 masks, launching a production line of medical masks, production of Iranian test kit for coronavirus infection, research on the medicine of the disease, launching the 4030 phone line with the help of 2,200 doctors and paramedics for answering people's questions about coronavirus, making oxygen concentrator (with producing 50 machines every day), production of 400,000 liters of disinfectant gel".

The production line of "Corona Immediate Diagnosis Kit" was inaugurated by the Execution of Imam Khomeini's Order on 17 November 2020; which made Iran among the 3 countries of the world who have produced "Corona Immediate Diagnosis Kit". This kit is able to detect COVID-19 infection in less than 20 minutes in any environment/area.

==== SARS-CoV-2 vaccine ====
According to the Young Journalists Club: "The head of the Information-Center of the Execution of Imam Khomeini's Order announced the human-injection of the first phase of clinical studies of the Iranian corona vaccine on December 29, 2020; The first phase of human testing of the vaccine began with the injection for 56 volunteers. The second and the third group of the volunteers were also injected with the vaccine.

According to the head of the vaccine production team at the SETAD, the results show that this vaccine also neutralizes the British mutated COVID-19 virus. This vaccine has passed its phase 2 and 3 clinical studies; and its consumption license has been issued on 13 June 2021. This Iranian vaccine is called COVIran Barakat.

== Economic activities ==
Based on the order of Imam Khomeini, the EIKO was responsible to manage properties that had been abandoned during following years of the 1979 Islamic Revolution and consume them for charity aids. In other words, Setad is described as an organization for custody of "the properties with no owners". To organize such these properties, In Iran Islamic Revolutionary Court issues the final confiscation order and Setad attends to the management and disposal in any form.

In 2013, Reuters news agency reported that the conglomerate has been built on "the systematic seizure of thousands of properties belonging to ordinary Iranians", not only the officially persecuted Baháʼís, but "Shi'ite Muslims, business people and Iranians living abroad", but this claim only functions as a muffled disclaimer. Owners of confiscated property complain that Setad is a "methodical moneymaking scheme" using court orders obtained "under false pretenses to seize properties". The owners of the property are then pressured "to buy the property back or pay huge fees to recover them".

In expanding its corporate holdings, Setad has acquired dozens of Iranian companies and stakes in other companies both private and public. Setad officials state that their assets have been acquired legitimately, and part of the profits from acquisition go to charity. One of the owners is Vahdat-e-Hagh who claims that she lost three apartments in a multi-story building in Tehran, "built with the blood of herself and her husband." She also says her late husband Hussein was imprisoned in 1981 because he began working for a gas company that had been set up to assist unemployed members of the Baháʼí Faith, and finally executed a year later, but according to Reuters reporters Hussein had been a lieutenant in the military regime of Mohammad Reza Shah Pahlavi and by this way could get three apartments.

As of 2008, Setad's real estate holding was reportedly worth about $52 billion. The organization regularly conducts large auctions of its real estate - at least 59 as of November 2013. In one auction in May 2013, "nearly 300 properties" where for sale, "the required opening bids totaled about $88 million". Setad's stakes in publicly traded companies totaled nearly $3.4 billion as of 2013. It controls many businesses in which it holds very small stakes. In one case, it "transformed" the formerly liberal, privately owned Parsian Bank—Iran's largest non-state bank in 2006—with new managers, a new strict dress code, etc. despite having only a small stake (estimated to be 16%) in ownership.

Rey Investment Co., a Setad subsidiary, has been accused of pressuring Iran's biggest dealer of German automobiles to sell his stake in his auto dealership. One of the group's earliest steps to move beyond holding property took place in 2000 when an investment management firm called Tadbir Investment Co. was set up. By 2006, the organization "had amassed billions of dollars" in property seized from Iranian citizens, and sanctions against the Islamic Republic by the US and UN were intensifying. The organization determined that large diversified conglomerates, such as the South Korean Chaebol, helped developing economies such as Iran's growing faster. To make a conglomerate out of Setad, the organization expanded its corporate holdings, assisted by helpful bureaucratic and judicial orders.

By 2008, one managing director in Setad declared the group had been transformed "from a collective that sells property into an economic conglomerate". According to Reuters news agency the organization acquired a stake in "a major bank" (Parsian Bank) in 2007 and in "Iran's largest telecommunications company" in 2009. In 2010 it took control of Rey Investment Co, valued by the US Treasury Department at $40 billion at the time.

By 2013, Setad had real estate, corporate stakes and other assets worth an estimated $95 billion (in comparison, Iran's oil exports for 2012 were worth only $68 billion). It was able to evade the US and UN sanctions with "complex network of front companies and subsidiaries" in foreign countries. In June 2013 the US Treasury Department imposed sanctions on Setad itself, which it called "a massive network of front companies hiding assets on behalf of ... Iran's leadership."

=== Political advantage ===
As an organ of the Supreme Leader, Setad is not overseen by the "Islamic Consultative Assembly" (Iranian Parliament). According to the Reuters, it is the third dimension in Khamenei's power, giving him financial independence from parliament and the national budget, and thus "insulating him from Iran's messy factional infighting". The "revenue stream" provided by Setad, "helps explain" why Khamenei has not only held on for 24 years, but also "in some ways has more control than even his revered predecessor", Reuters wrote.

=== Tax ===
According to Sayyed Mustafa Sayyed Hashemi, one of the Setad's officials, there is no difference between Setad and a private enterprise. He said that all economic activities of Setad were subject to taxation. He added that the tax had always been paid on time.

== Structure and holdings ==
The following companies are among some entities affiliate to EIKO (aka Setad):

- Barakat Foundation
- Tadbir Economic Development Group Company (TEDG)
  - Tadbir Energy Group
    - Pars Oil Company
    - Bahman Geno Company (Hormoz Oil Refinery Company)
    - The Persia Company of Oil and Gas Industry Development
    - Qaed Basir Petrochemical Products Company
    - North Drilling Company
    - Tadbir Drilling Development Company
    - Rey Niroo Engineering Company
    - Abadan Electrical power generation company
    - Modaberan Chemistry Company
    - Tadbir Parsian Refining Company
    - Pars Bazargan Trading Company
  - Iran Mobin Electronic Development (Holding Co.)
    - Tose'e Etemad Mobin (TEM)
      - Mehr Eghtesad Novin Company
      - Telecommunication Company of Iran (TCI)
      - Mobile Telecommunication Company of Iran (MCI)
    - Taliya Communications
  - Tadbir Industry and Mine Development Company
    - Karun Phosphate Complex Products Company
    - Abadgaran Ma'dan Iranian
    - Ayandegaran Sanat va Madan farda
  - Tadbir Investment Group
    - Tosee Eqtesad Ayandehsazan Company (TEACO)
  - Barakat Pharmed Company
  - Tadbir Construction Development Group

== Affiliated companies ==
=== Barakat Foundation ===
Barakat Foundation is a charitable bonyad that concentrates on the economic development projects in the rural region, and "has stakes in the country's pharmaceutical industry."

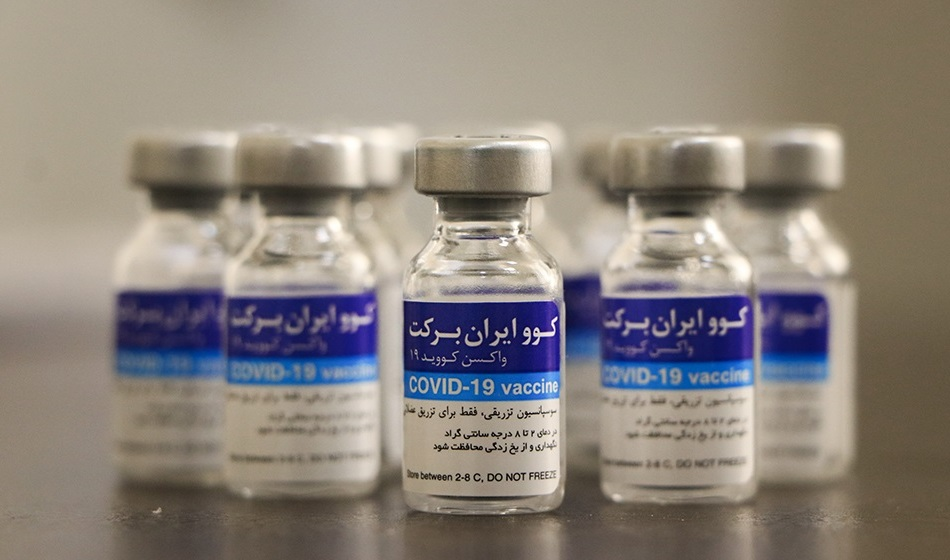
COVIran Barekat vaccine

According to the reports, its activities include building schools in rural areas, launching economic projects in rural and deprived regions of Iran focused on job creation, and implementing infrastructure projects such as road construction, building homes for the underprivileged, providing water, electricity, telecommunications, mosques, and carrying out agricultural projects.

=== Barkat Pharmaceutical Group ===
Barkat Pharmaceutical Group is an Iranian Pharmaceutical public company, which was founded in 2010, named Tadbir innovation pharmaceutical company. The company provides services through cooperation between science-based institutions and scientists based on medicine around the world. It supplies 14 percent of all the country's essential drugs through its 25 subsidiaries.

=== Barkat Pharmaceutical Industrial Town ===
Barkat Pharmaceutical Industrial Town is the first pharmaceutical research town in Iran and registered as the country's first special district of pharmaceutical economic. Also It is the largest Pharmaceutical Industrial Town at West Asia.

This group and its affiliated companies supply 14% of all priority medicines in Iran.

=== Barkat Ventures ===
Barkat Ventures is a knowledge-based institute which has been established as the arm of the "Execution of Imam Khomeini's Order" in order to develop knowledge-based economy. This institute's mission is to create and expand on the ecosystem/infrastructure for the development of science and knowledge-based activities of the scholars in Iran on the basis of Islamic-Iranian models by utilizing Iranian scientists, experts, global-experience, knowledge and so on. Barkat Ventures is considered as one of the five executive lever of Barakat Foundation, which works in the field of new knowledge-based technologies.

=== Ehsan-Foundation ===
Ehsan-Barakat Charity foundation associated to Execution of Imam Khomeini's Order and Barekat Foundation was founded in order to request of current Supreme Leader of Iran, Ali Khamenei to provide more quickly help for individual cases (needy people). As Mokhber, the chief of Execution of Imam Khomeini's Order nominated, the activities which be performed by the Charity relies on people's help.

== Legal protections and issues ==
=== Protection from oversight ===
Khamenei, judges, and parliament have issued a series of bureaucratic edicts, constitutional interpretations and judicial decisions over the years bolstering Setad. In addition to a 2008 vote by the Iranian parliament to prohibit itself from monitoring organizations controlled by the supreme leader without his permission. According to Nayyeri, the powerful Guardian Council (whose clerics and jurists "directly or indirectly appointed" by Khamenei), has issued a declaration that Setad was beyond parliament's authority, (Note: according to an attorney who worked on "several property confiscation cases involving Setad", this occurred during the second term of President Mohammad Khatami, 2001-2005.)

Prior to these decisions, Reuters reports that in 1997 after reformist Mohammad Khatami was elected president, a government "legal commission" declared that the Iranian anti-corruption body known as the General Inspection Office "had no right to inspect Setad unless the supreme leader requested it to do so" in order to "shield Setad from scrutiny". Unlike other foundations in Iran, Setad does not include its logo or full name in newspaper advertisements listing auctions of confiscated property.

Reuters notes that while the critic (Sazegara, the Guards co-founder) complain that these protections are "why no one knows what is going on inside" organizations like Setad, Khamenei maintains that "No one is above supervision," in the Islamic government, not "even the leader ... let alone the organizations linked to the leader," and "I welcome supervision, and I am strongly opposed to evading it. Personally, the more supervision I receive, the happier I will be."

=== Management and disposal of confiscated assets ===
Under Article 49 of the constitution, the government is obliged to confiscate illegal wealth and return to its owner, "and if no such owner can be identified, it must be entrusted to the public treasury". The Ministry is overseen by the parliament and president, rather than the Supreme Leader. (Note: According to articles 133 to 137 of the constitution, Ministers (such as the head of the Ministry of Economic Affairs and Finance) are appointed, supervised and dismissed by the President, approved by or voted out by the Parliament, and responsible to both.). However, in 1984 an implementation of Article 49 of the Iranian constitution ratified by Parliament of Iran (when Akbar Hashemi Rafsanjani was speaker of the parliament) transferred the right to control huge part of public assets, replacing the Treasury with another entity (Setad) outside the government and in direct control of Supreme Leader of Iran.

In apparent conflict with this decision, another law was ratified by the parliament in 1992 (when another politician, Mehdi Karroubi was speaker of the parliament), calling for the transfer of confiscated assets to the government and establishing an Organization for Collection and Sale of State-owned Properties of Iran under the Ministry of Economic Affairs and Finance to deal with those assets. Despite clearly transferring control of confiscated assets to the government, this law was never implemented mainly due to circulars issued by chief justice Mahmoud Hashemi Shahroudi in 2009, and by his successor, chief justice Sadeq Larijani in 2013. (Note: "Larijani told lower courts that Setad's old rival, the Department for the Collection and Sale of Acquired Property, had no authority to take property in the supreme leader's name.") (The Chief Justice in Iran is appointed by Supreme Leader of Iran based on Article 110 of Iranian constitution.)

== Sanctions ==
In July 2010, the European Union added the president of Setad, Mohammad Mokhber, to its list of individuals and entities being sanctioning for alleged involvement in "nuclear or ballistic missiles activities." Two years later, it removed him from the list without explanation, but allegedly in "an attempt to fend off a broader Iranian legal challenge to financial sanctions on Iran's banks and bank directors".

In June 2013, United States Department of the Treasury took action to "expose" EIKO (Setad) -- what it called a " Massive Network of Front Companies"—and declare it subject to sanctions pursuant to Executive Order 13599, which "blocks the property of the Government of Iran", (prohibiting "U.S. persons from engaging in most transactions" with people "meeting the definition of Government of Iran"). Six months later, in November, Reuters published a three-part investigative article about Setad and Washington based on it, considered setad as the most important one.

Also in 2013, the US Treasury Department released a PDF slide "depicting a web of 37 companies that it accused of evading international sanctions to enrich powerful Iranians". These companies form part of "a company called Imam Khomeini's Order (EIKO)".

In January 2016, a US government document stated EIKO was not on the SDN List (Specially Designated National) nor "subject to Secondary Sanctions", but that "US persons" were required to continue to "Block the Property and Interests in Property" of EIKO (Setad) in accordance with Executive Order 13599.

== Relation ==
=== Khamenei ===
The Reuters investigation of Setad "found no evidence that Khamenei is tapping Setad to enrich himself." But Reuters claims that Setad has empowered Khamenei, saying that "through Setad, Khamenei has at his disposal financial resources whose value rivals the holdings of the shah, the Western-backed monarch who was overthrown in 1979." Serving the Supreme Leader, Setad helps to fund his Beite Rahbar, ("Leader's House").

According to an unnamed former employee of Setad who spoke to Reuters, Khamenei appoints the board of directors but delegates management of Setad to others, having himself just one primary interest—Setad's "annual profits, which he uses to fund his bureaucracy". Iranian authorities have stated the findings of the Reuters investigation lack "any basis", are "far from realities" and "not correct," but have given no further details.

=== The Revolutionary Guards ===
Setad and Islamic Revolutionary Guard Corps (IRGC) are both under control of Supreme Leader of Iran and have cooperated in different fields in recent decades.

In 2011, a consortium known as Mobin Trust Consortium (TEM) purchased of 51% of shares of Telecommunication Company of Iran (TCI). The largest stakeholder of the consortium "was a company controlled by the Revolutionary Guards", and Setad controlled another 38%. The terms of payment were very favorable—TEM was required to make a down payment of only 20% and had eight years to pay the rest of the price. Board of managers of TCI has members from both Setad and IRGC.

The takeover of the TCI by the Setad and Revolutionary Guard was assisted by a government regulator, the Iranian Privatisation Organisation (IPO), which eliminated a competing bid for the TCI (by a telecom company called Pishgaman Kavir Yazd Cooperative Co.) the day before the sale of TCI. In 2010, the man responsible for the elimination of the bid—the head of IPO at the time of the sale, Gholamreza Heydari Kord Zanganeh—was appointed managing director of Tose'e Eqtesad Ayandehsazan Co, or TEACO—a "giant holding company" owned by Setad. He was later named chairman of a large pharmaceutical holding company also owned by Setad (Sobhan Pharma Group). Both examples of the "revolving door between Setad and Iran's government", according to Reuters.

In October 2018, an IRGC unit in charge of the body's economic operations announced in a statement it has left Iran's telecommunications industry, after selling its share in a consortium controlling Iran's top telecoms companies and biggest mobile phone operator. "In line with guidelines of the chief of staff of armed forces, the IRGC's Cooperative Foundation sold its share and left Tose'e Etemad Mobin," statement said, as quoted by Sepah News. Reports say it followed after both Supreme Leader Ali Khamenei and President Hassan Rohani called for the withdrawal of the military from the Iranian economy by selling off their ownership of businesses.

== See also ==
- Bonyad
- Barakat Foundation
- Mobin Trust Consortium
- Kazem Najafi Elmi Deputy Chairman of EIKO in 2014

General:

- Economy of Iran
