= Mobeen =

Given name of Arabic origin

Mobeen (Arabic: مبين; Persian: مبین) (also spelt Mubeen, Mobin, Mubin) is a given name derived from an Arabic word (مبين), which is used as a poetic adjective in literature, speech and religious contexts. The name can be translated as 'distinct', 'lucid', 'eloquent', 'prominent' or 'clarity'. It is commonly used as a given name in the Middle East, Afghanistan, Pakistan, India, Bangladesh and respective diaspora.

== Etymology ==
The definition of Mobeen is "something that is clear and incomparable to anything else".

The name is primarily derived from the Muslim holy book, the Quran, in which it is used multiple times as an adjective to describe the Quran. it is also has other uses in Islamic religion like referring to the islam as the clear religion etc

== Given name ==
- Mobeen Azhar (born 1980), British journalist, radio and television presenter
- Mobin Master, Australian DJ and producer
- Mobin Mirdoraghi (born 1993), Iranian football defender
- Mobin Mohan (born 1988), Indian novelist
- Mobin Nasri (born 2003), Iranian volleyball player
- Mubeen Hameed (born 1995), Pakistani cricketer
- Mubeen Mughal (1992–2016), Pakistani cricketer
- Mubeen Saudagar, Indian stand-up comedian and mimicry artist
- Mubinul Azim (1934–1975), Bangladeshi painter
- Mubin Ergashev (born 1973), Tajik professional football former player
- Mubin Shaikh, former security intelligence and counter terrorism operative
- Mubin Sheppard (1905–1994), Malaysian World War II veteran

== Surname ==
- Abdul Hakkul Mubin (died 1673), the thirteenth Sultan of Brunei
- Abu Lais Md. Mubin Chowdhury (1942–2013), Bangladeshi Nationalist Party politician
- Dananeer Mobeen (born 2001), Pakistani actress and social media influencer
- Kazi Mobin-Uddin (1930–1999), American surgeon
- Md Abdul Mubeen (born 1955), Bangladeshi General

== Fictional characters with the name ==
- Mobeen, in British sitcom Man Like Mobeen

== See also ==
- Fath ol Mobin (disambiguation)
- Al-Fatah al-Mubin, operations room of Syrian rebel and jihadist factions participating in the Syrian civil war
- Mobinnet (Mobin Net), an Iranian Internet service provider
- Mobin Trust Consortium, an Iranian company
- Nūram Mūbin, Gujarati Nizari Ismaili text
