= Noora (vaccine) =

Vaccine candidate against COVID-19

Vaccine description
- Target: SARS-CoV-2
- Vaccine type: Protein subunit

Clinical data
- Routes of administration: Intramuscular

Identifiers
- CAS Number: 2699609-20-4

Noora (Persian: نورا) is a COVID-19 vaccine candidate developed by Baqiyatallah University of Medical Sciences in collaboration with Plasma Darman Sarv Sepid Co. (lit. White Cypress Plasma Treatment) in Iran. Introduced in June 2021, it was announced as having "successfully passed the first phase of its clinical trial" two months later.

The clinical trial reported in the Journal of Medical Virology met a critical scrutiny in May 2023, after which the journal declared it as an invalid study and retracted it in March 2024. Independent research in 2024 indicated that the vaccine is very weak (poor immunogenicity and neutralization efficacy) unlikely useful for the later variants of SARS-CoV-2.

== History ==
Noora vaccine was developed by an Iranian team led by Jafar Salimian and Jafar Amani at the Baqiyatallah University of Medical Sciences in Tehran, which is supported by the Islamic Revolutionary Guard Corps. Its design and preparation started in the early 2020 and completed in June 2021. The vaccine with its Phase I clinical trial was officially launched on 27 June 2021. IRGC Commander-in-Chief Major General Hossein Salami and Health Minister Saeed Namaki officiated the unveiling, and Hossein Samadinia, head of the Baqiyatallah Hospital, received the first dose at the inaugural. Phase I clinical trial involved 70 volunteers and was completed in August 2021.

In March 2022, Hassan Abolqasemi, chancellor of Baqiyatallah University of Medical Sciences, announced that the Phase III clinical trial was completed that involved 10,000 participants. Soon after which the Iranian Ministry of Health gave it a permit for emergency use, and became the sixth COVID-19 vaccine (after COVIran Barekat, Pasto Covac, Razi Cov Pars, SpikoGen, and FAKHRAVAC) produced in Iran. The vaccine preparation and preclinical tests in mice, rabbits, and monkeys were reported in the journal Molecular Immunology in September 2022.

The first clinical trial led by Salimian and Amani, and supervised by Hassan Abolghasemi and Gholamhossein Alishiri, was published in the Journal of Medical Virology 27 August 2022. The report claims that the vaccine is effective, safe and capable of providing immunity. The report concludes:

The results of this Phase 1 trial showed acceptable safety without serious adverse events and significant seroconversions in the humoral and cellular immunity panel. The dose of 80 μg is an appropriate dose for injection in the next phases of the trial.

== Medical uses ==
Noora vaccine requires three doses given by intramuscular injection on days 0, 21 and 35. Phase I clinical trial was claimed to indicate successful immunity against SARS-CoV-2 Omicron variant.

== Pharmacology ==
Noora is a recombinant RBD protein subunit vaccine. It contains three truncated parts of SARS-CoV-2: spike protein, receptor-binding protein and nucleoprotein. The immune response is enhanced by the addition of alum as an adjuvant.

== Manufacturing ==
By early 2022, 3 million doses were produced monthly. As of March 2022, 5 millions doses were produced.

== Clinical trials ==
Clinical trials of Noora
Phase	Registration number	Start	Number of participants			Age of participants	Ref
Phase	Registration number	Start	Total	Vaccine	Placebo	Age of participants	Ref
I	IRCT20210620051639N1	25 June 2021	70	30 (80 μg) 30 (120 μg)	10 (placebo)	18–50 years	
II	IRCT20210620051639N2	10 October 2021	300	240	60	18–40 years	
III	IRCT20210620051639N3	23 December 2021	10000			>18 years	

== Controversy ==
In May 2023, Donald Forthal, chief of infectious diseases at the University of California, Irvine, wrote a commentary on the Phase I clinical trial paper in the Journal of Medical Virology, severely criticising the validity of the study. Forthal pointed out several data inconsistency, misrepresentation, vague experimental methods and conflict of interest that would have used to reject the paper in the first place. He made a concern that "a manuscript containing so many serious flaws would have been accepted for publication following peer review, and given these issues, a retraction may be in order". As the criticism was posted on PubPeer, other scientists also raised other concerns in the study. Australian epidemiologist Gideon Meyerowitz-Katz stated that the report had several other "impossible" and "contradictory" results.

While the authors and the Baqiyatallah University remained silent, Journal of Medical Virology's editor-in-chief Shou-Jiang Gao invited justifications from the authors. The authors submitted the rebuttal, but after the third round of peer reviewing, they gave up on the final dateline of 23 November 2023 for revision. With no further response from the authors, the journal announced retraction of the paper on 2 March 2024, with a note:

The retraction has been agreed due to concerns raised by third parties regarding issues with the data presented in the article. Several inconsistencies concerning the information provided about the analyzed subjects were additionally identified. Furthermore, the authors failed to disclose the presence of potential conflicts of interest that may have affected the interpretation of the results presented. Accordingly, the editors consider the conclusions of this manuscript to be invalid. The authors have been informed of the decision to retract but did not agree with it.

One of the supervisors of the clinical trial, Abolghasemi claimed that the criticism and retraction were not of scientific causes but of prejudices, and his team was not given a chance for explanation. As he wrote to Retraction Watch: "Retraction of our article was a political decision not a scientific decision because there was a pressure on journal based on [apartheid] scientific issue. Our response to the comment never accepted by [PubPeer] and journal to be published."

An independent research team from Tehran University of Medical Sciences and Avicenna Research Institute experimentally analysed four COVID-19 vaccines developed in Iran. Their report in Iranian Journal of Immunology, published in March 2024, showed that Noora and SpikoGen do hot have the expected efficacy (as indicated by poor immunogenicity and neutralization efficacy). As the two vaccines do not provide protection from SARS-CoV-2 Delta variant, it is unlikely useful for the later variants of SARS-CoV-2.

== See also ==
- Pharmaceuticals in Iran
- COVID-19 pandemic in Iran
- COVID-19 vaccine clinical research
