= IJI =

IJI or Iji may refer to:

- Iji, a freeware videogame
- Iji Castle, a Japanese castle whose ruins are now in the city of Kurihara
- Adud al-Din al-Iji, 14th–century Islamic theologian
- Iranian Journal of Immunology, a quarterly journal concerned with immunology
- Islami Jamhoori Ittehad, a political party in Pakistan
