= Foreign Ministers' Meeting of Neighboring Countries of Afghanistan =

The Foreign Ministers' Meeting of Neighboring Countries of Afghanistan is an international conference at the level of foreign ministers, convened by countries surrounding Afghanistan to discuss issues related to the country.

== Background ==
After the United States military withdrew from Afghanistan in August 2021, the Taliban quickly took over the Afghan government and re-established the Islamic Emirate of Afghanistan. At the same time, many countries cut off financial aid to Afghanistan, resulting in a severe economic and humanitarian crisis in Afghanistan.

== Meetings ==
=== First meeting ===
The first meeting of foreign ministers of neighboring countries of Afghanistan was held in Pakistan on September 8, 2021 via video conference. The foreign ministers or deputy foreign ministers of Pakistan, China, Iran, Tajikistan, Uzbekistan and Turkmenistan attended the meeting.

=== Second meeting ===
The second meeting of foreign ministers of neighboring countries of Afghanistan was held in Tehran, the capital of Iran, on October 27, 2021. The opening address was delivered by Mohammad Mokhber, the first vice president of Iran. Foreign ministers from Iran, Turkmenistan, Pakistan, Tajikistan, Uzbekistan and other countries, as well as Yue Xiaoyong, the special envoy of the Chinese Ministry of Foreign Affairs for Afghan affairs, participated in the meeting in Tehran. The foreign ministers of Russia and China participated via video. UN secretary-general António Guterres delivered a video address. The meeting issued a joint statement calling on the relevant parties in Afghanistan to stabilize the situation in Afghanistan and maintain communication with all parties.

=== Third Meeting ===
The Third Meeting of Foreign Ministers of Afghanistan's Neighboring Countries was held in Tunxi, Anhui, China on March 31, 2022. UN Secretary-General António Guterres delivered a speech via video. Chinese State Councilor and Foreign Minister Wang Yi, Iranian Foreign Minister Hossein Amir-Abdulrahyan, Pakistani Foreign Minister Qureshi, Russian Foreign Minister Lavrov, Tajik Minister of Justice Ashuryon, Turkmen Deputy Prime Minister and Foreign Minister Meredov, and Uzbek Deputy Prime Minister and Minister of Investment and Foreign Trade Umurzakov attended the meeting. After the meeting, the "Joint Statement of the Third Meeting of Foreign Ministers of Afghanistan's Neighboring Countries" and the "Tunxi Initiative of Afghanistan's Neighboring Countries on Supporting Afghanistan's Economic Reconstruction and Practical Cooperation" were issued. During the Third Meeting of Foreign Ministers of Afghanistan’s Neighboring Countries, the special representatives of the four countries of China, the United States, Russia and Pakistan on the Afghan issue, including Yue Xiaoyong of China and Thomas West of the United States, held a meeting of the “China-US-Russia+” consultation mechanism on the same day in the same place. Representatives attending the meeting of foreign ministers of neighboring countries, Indonesian Foreign Minister Retno Marsudi, Qatari Foreign Minister Mohammed bin Abdulrahman Al Thani and Amir Khan Mutaqi, acting foreign minister of the Afghan interim government, held a “Afghanistan’s Neighboring Countries + Afghanistan” foreign ministers’ dialogue.

Rotman, director of the Peace and Security Policy Department at the Global Public Policy Institute in Berlin, believes that this meeting foreshadows China's gradual replacement of Russia's position in Russia's traditional sphere of influence in Central Asia.

=== Fourth Meeting ===
The fourth meeting of foreign ministers of Afghanistan’s neighboring countries was held in Samarkand, Uzbekistan on April 13, 2023. The meeting was chaired by Uzbekistan’s acting foreign minister, Saidov. Foreign ministers or deputy foreign ministers from China, Russia, Iran, Tajikistan, Turkmenistan, Pakistan and other countries attended the meeting. After the meeting, the parties attended the dialogue between the foreign ministers of Afghanistan’s neighboring countries and Afghanistan.
