= JMV =

JMV may refer to:

- Journal of Medical Virology, a monthly peer-reviewed medical journal
- Jharkhand Vidhi Mahavidyalaya, a private law school in India
- Jamovi, a graphical user interface for R programming language
- JMV Industries shipyard, a subsidiary of CMN
