= Kazem Najafi Elmi =

Iranian banker and professor

- کاظم نجفی علمی
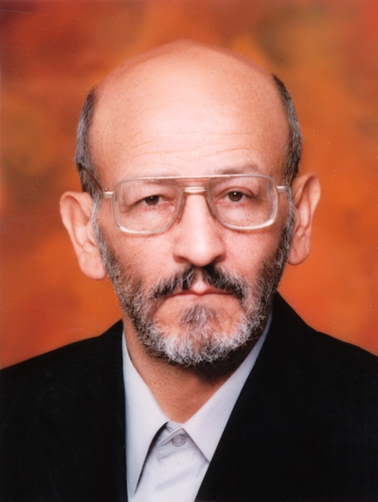
- Najafi Elmi, 2010 Spring

CEO of Bank Melli Iran
- In office 1986–1989
- Appointed by: Mohammad Javad Iravani
- President: Ali Khamenei

Member of the board of trustees and deputy of EIKO.
- In office 2009–2014
- Appointed by: Ali Khamenei
- Chairman: Mohammad Mokhber

CEO of Audit Organization of Iran
- In office 2007–2009
- Appointed by: Mahmoud Ahmadinejad

Chairman of the Consolidation Commission Expediency Discernment Council
- In office 2004–2007
- Appointed by: Mohsen Rezaee
- Chairman: Akbar Rafsanjani

Personal details
- Born: 1946 Tehran,Iran
- Died: 2014 (aged 67–68)
- Education: PhD. Economics
- Occupation: Economist، Banker، Professor

Kazem Najafi Elmi (Persian: کاظم نجفی علمی; born in 1946 in Tehran - died in 2014) was an Iranian banker, professor, economist and executive director. Najafi Elmi was first known as the managing director of the Bank Melli of the Islamic Republic of Iran from 1986 to 1989.

== Education ==
Najafi Elmi was an assistant professor and member of the university faculty in Economics. He received a Bachelor's Degree in Economics from Tehran University, a Master's Degree in Management from Former National University, and a PhD in Economics from University of Tehran Science and Research.

== Career ==
Najafi Elmi was the CEO of Bank Melli Iran and the manager of the first vision document of Iran in the 25-year horizon of 1400 and the secretary of the strategic scientific commission of the Iran's 20-year vision plan (Iran 1404) (2003).

In 2007, he was the CEO of Audit Organization of Iran. Until 2014, he was a member of the Board of Trustees of the Execution of Imam Khomeini's Order, an organization under direct control of the Supreme Leader of Iran.

In 1985, he was the Deputy Banking Minister of Economy and Finance of Iran in the government of Mirhossein Mousavi. He was the chairman of the advisory board of Supreme Audit Court of Iran in the fifth and sixth periods of the Islamic Consultative Assembly in Iran.
He taught microeconomics, macroeconomics, financial management, domestic and international banking at Allameh Tabataba'i University, Imam Sadegh University and Islamic Azad University.

In December 2013, Najafi Elmi's influential scientific and managerial efforts were recognized at an official ceremony attended by leading Iranian political figures, including Mohsen Rezaee, Secretary of the Expediency Discernment Council, Mohammad Mokhbar, CEO of EIKO, Mohammad Javad Iravani, Deputy Leader of Iran and Mahmoud Bahmani, Governor of the Central Bank of Iran.

Najafi Elmi's work includes The Question of Globalization (2009) and Cultural engineering of the country (Iran) (2005).

== Death ==
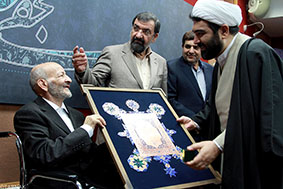
Kazem Najafi Elmi,Mohsen Rezaee,Mohammad Mokhber, Commemoration Ceremony, Dec. 2013

Najafi Elmi died in 2014. Seyyed Ali Khamenei, the Supreme Leader of Iran, in a message on the occasion of Najafi Elmi's death, called him one of the most honest and efficient managers of the Islamic Republic of Iran.

Government offices
Preceded by Majid Ghasemi	Ceo of the Bank Melli Iran; 1986–1989	Succeeded by Asad-o-allah Amir Aslani
Preceded by Houshang Naderian	Ceo of the Audit Organization of Iran; 2007–2009	Succeeded by Akbar Soheilipour
