= Barkat Pharmaceutical Group =

Iranian pharmaceutical group

- Type: Public company
- Industry: Pharmaceutical
- Founded: 2010 in Tehran, Iran
- Area served: Asia
- Key people: Akbar Borandegi (CEO); Hamid Reza Jamshidi (Managing Director)
- Website: en.bpharmed.com

Barkat Pharmaceutical Group (Persian: گروه دارویی برکت, Gruh-e Darvii-ye Berekât) is an Iranian Pharmaceutical public company, which was founded in 2010, named Tadbir innovation pharmaceutical company. The company provides services through cooperation between science-based institutions and scientists based on medicine around the world. It supplies 14 percent of all the country's essential drugs through its 25 subsidiaries. The company produces 700 kinds of products in the pharmaceutical sector and offers it internally.

The Barkat Pharmaceutical Group has established as the first specialized drug and pharmaceutical research center in Iran, also it has been developed by constructing advanced pharmaceutical factories, called Barkat Pharmaceutical Town. The Barkat group complies with all common pharmaceutical standards such as the FDA, WHO, EMEA. "Cell therapy", production of "peptide medications", "research, development and processing of medicinal plants," the creation of the "Museum of Iranian-Islamic Medicine" as well as "Solids and Semi-Solids" projects are the main activities of the Group.

On 4 December 2016, the company was listed as Tehran Stock Exchange's 506th company after receiving 340 billion Rials in funding.

== Investment ==
On 5 February 2017, 340 million shares of the Barkat Pharmaceutical Group were first Released on the Tehran Stock Exchange in the Group of Pharmaceutical Materials and Products. By this date, 50% of the company's shareholders were natural people. According to Baqerinezhad, the company's research and development deputy, 800 billion tomans is defined as investment, for the second five-year development plan of the company. Also, in order to realize the support of the private sector, a Research and Development Fund of Bold investing (VC) has been launched. It is also possible to invest over $5 billion, in full capacity, in the Barkat Pharmaceutical Town.

The Barkat Pharmaceutical Group has signed investment contracts with 30 and domestic medical and healthcare companies in the healthcare industry. So far in order to produce medicines, there are three contracts between pharmaceutical companies from Switzerland, the UK and Denmark for producing medicines. The direct investment contract of €70 million with a Danish pharmaceutical company in 2015 and a contract of $15 million with a Swiss company in 2016 were among the most important of these contracts. This holding, which has more than 500,000 shareholders, is considered as the second pharmaceutical holding of the country in the pharmaceutical industry.

== Establishment ==
Barkat Pharmaceutical Group Company (Public Joint Stock Company) was established with more than 20 subsidiaries in 2010 based on the analysis and foresight of Iran's pharmaceutical industry and to meet the needs of society, under the name of "Tadbir New Pharmaceutical Technologies Company". The company, as a knowledge-based economic complex, has chosen its approach to focus on health products. Barkat Pharmaceutical Group operates with 25 companies in its subsidiary, all of which are active in the drug supply chain.

== Director ==
The current managing director of the Barkat Pharmaceutical Group is Hamid Reza Jamshidi, who has a Ph.D. degree in Pharmacy from the University of Isfahan and a Ph.D. in Neuroscience from the University of Alberta, Canada.

== Activities ==
One of the activities of the Barkat Pharmaceutical Group is the building of a 200-hectare pharmaceutical town. Also, "cell therapy" by producing five products for the treatment of skin and heart disease and knee arthritis, production of "peptide medications" using in the treatment of high-dose diseases such as Multiple sclerosis, blood diseases and cancer, "Research and development and processing of medicinal plants", to use domestic capacities and prevent the sale of raw materials and entry into world markets, the "Museum of Iranian-Islamic medicine" to show the role of Iranian scientists in medicine, as well as the "Solids and Semi-Solids" projects to increase the production of various pharmaceutical products, are among other activities of the Barkat Pharmaceutical Group.

=== Cell therapy ===
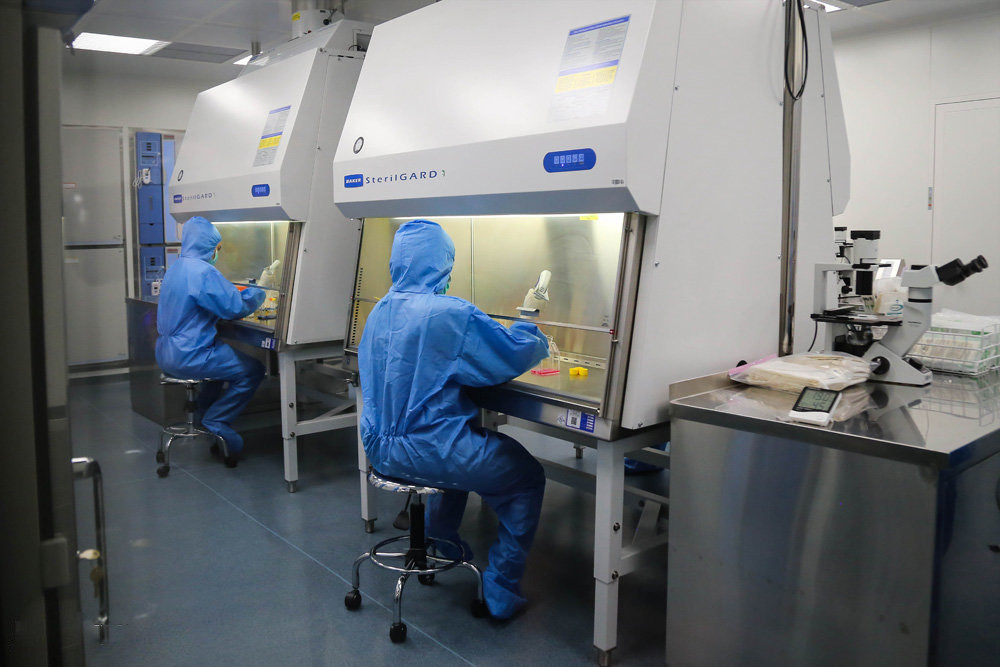
The environment and personnel of the first Western Asian human cell production plant at the Cell tech Pharmed Co.

On May 15, 2018, the first factory for the production of stem cells in Western Asia (Cell Tech Pharmed) was inaugurated with the presence of Minister of Health and Medical Education Hassan Ghazizadeh Hashemi, and the First Vice President of Iran Eshaq Jahangiri The factory, set up by Barkat Pharmaceutical Company and Royan Institute, is a subsidiary of the Barkat Pharmaceutical Group and is run by Cell Tech Pharmed, a company established in 2014 to work on stem cells, biotechnology, nanotechnology and pharmaceuticals. It also manufactures products including Monocell, Ricollersal, Rhinooderm cell, etc. which are used to treat various cardiovascular, skin and skeletal diseases.

In June 2025, 23 new drugs were unveiled in this complex, including seven for cancer treatment, six in the form of herbal supplements, and two products related to cell therapy. Some of these drugs were previously imported, while others had limited access within the country.

=== Anticancer drugs ===
In order to provide anticancer drugs in the country, "Sobhan Chemotherapy products Company" (Sobhan Oncology Co, under the supervision of the Barkat Pharmaceutical Group ) was set up on 2002, and launched in February 2010 with global standards. The main activity of the company is the production of drugs for the treatment of cancer patients. It is the first anti-cancer product manufacturer in the Middle East. The company's pharmaceutical products are distributed around the country and also exported to 10 other countries. Sobhan Oncology Company produces anticancer drugs in the form of oral and injectable drugs. Also using nanotechnology in producing anticancer improves drug delivery and increases efficacy on cancerous tissue and reduces the side effects of treatment.

In May 2024, five anti-cancer and antifungal drugs developed by the Barekat Pharmaceutical Group were launched in Rasht Industrial City, in the presence of Parviz Fattah, the Head of the Execution of Imam Khomeini's Order. The production of these five anti-cancer drugs has fulfilled a substantial portion of the country's domestic demand.

=== Vaccines ===
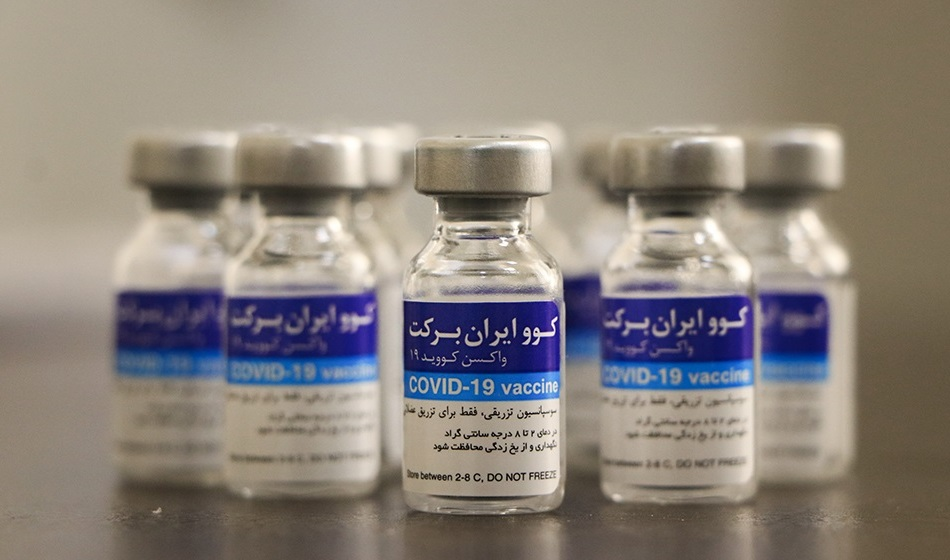
COVIran Barekat, Iran's first COVID-19 vaccine

COVIran Barekat is Iran's first domestic COVID-19 vaccine. It's made by Shifa Pharmed Industrial Group, a subsidiary of Barkat Pharmaceutical Group. Clinical trials began in December 2020 and the vaccine received emergency use authorization on 13 June 2021. According to the Execution of Imam Khomeini's Order, about 8 million doses of COVIran Barekat have been produced up to 30 August 2021. According to British medical journal, the BMJ in 2023, this Iranian vaccine has 100% efficacy against related death at 90 days.

The quadrivalent vaccine Gardisun for the prevention of human papillomavirus was produced by Barkat Pharmaceutical Group and unveiled in May 2025.

== Barkat Pharmaceutical Industrial Town ==
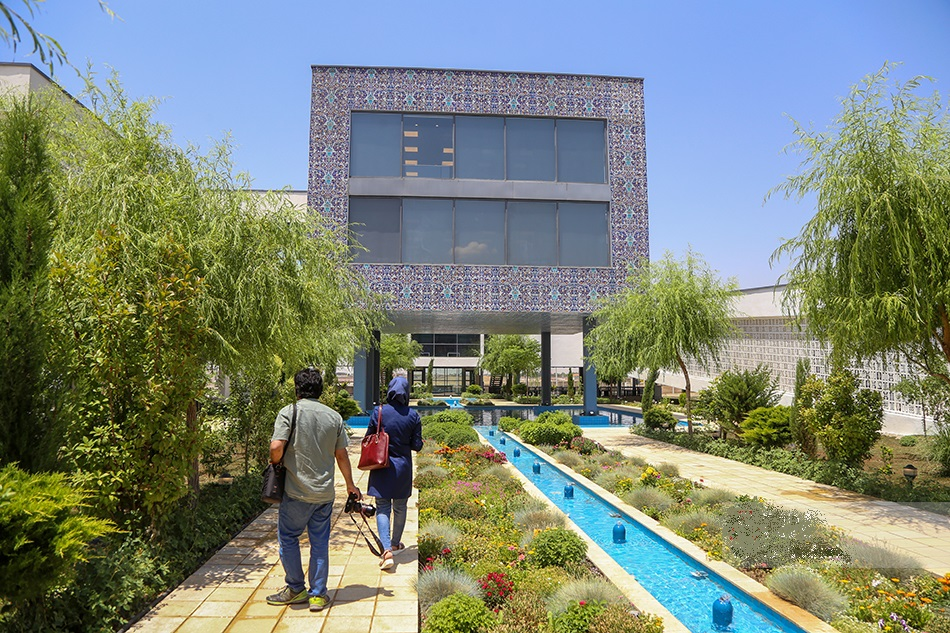
Building of the Medicinal Herbs Garden Museum in Barkat Pharmaceutical Town

The Barkat Pharmaceutical Industrial Town is a specialized pharmaceutical and research Town Which was registered as the first pharmaceutical industrial park in the country and the country's first Special Economic Pharmaceutical zone. The site is located in Savojbolagh with area of 200 hectares, Alborz province, 60 km away from Tehran and designed by international consultants and based on the latest standards of the world's pharmaceutical-industrial cities. One of the main goal for the establishment of the Barkat Pharmaceutical Industrial Park is attracting $2 billion to finance a wide range of medical and pharmaceutical needs, including bio drugs, medical equipment, laboratory diagnostic kits and pharmaceutical packaging materials. The pharmaceutical company's products are supplied locally and exported abroad. Being High tech and ability to provide new services and innovations to the community are the main indicators of the acceptance of companies in the Barkat Industrial Pharmaceutical Town. According to Najafi, Governor of Alborz, this site has presented more than 7,000 direct job opportunities.

=== Capacities ===
In the Special Economic Pharmaceutical zone of Barkat, the appropriate space is anticipated for the deployment of pharmaceutical manufacturing companies in the fields of research and development and incubators, knowledge-based, cell therapy, biotechnology, gene therapy, blood and plasma refinement, vaccine, and also pharmaceutical companies and central warehouses. The Barkat Pharmaceutical Town also includes a cell factory with participation of the Royan Institute in the field of Cell Therapy and an international pharmacy university in PhD's degree to provide the required specialized personnel, researchers, and healthcare technologists.

According to "Hamid Reza Jamshidi", the managing director of Barkat Pharmaceutical Group, 12% of the drugs of the Islamic Republic of Iran are produced in this pharmaceutical group.

=== Herbal medicines ===
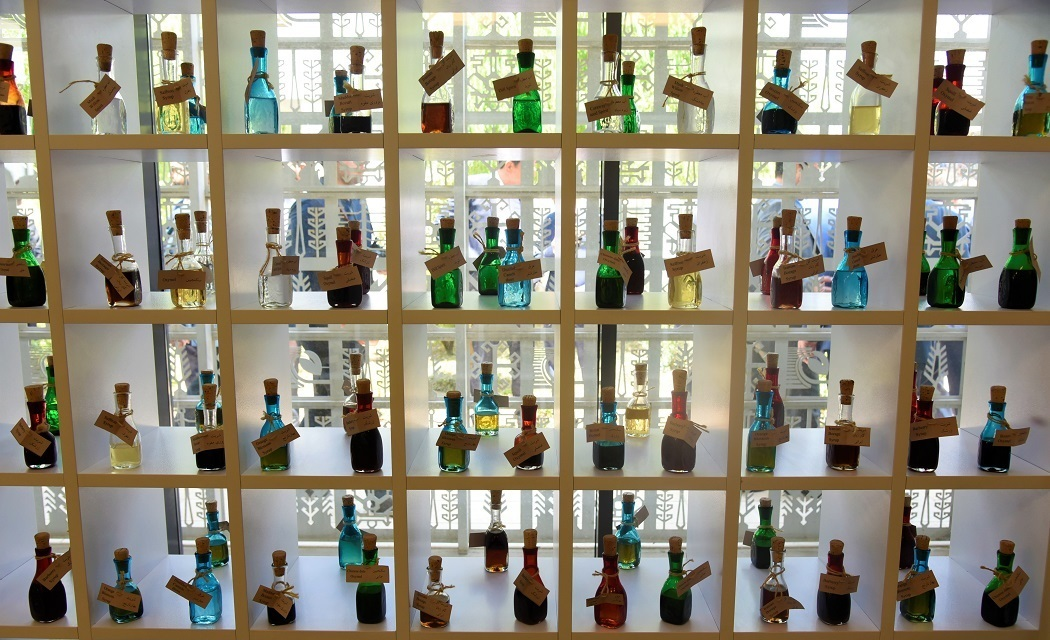

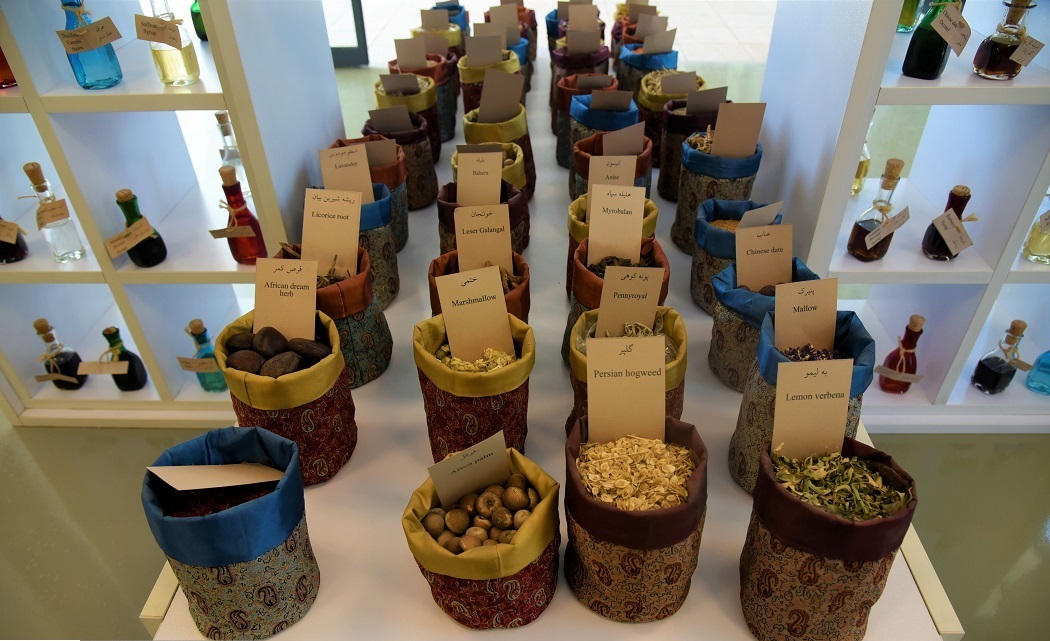
Examples of Medicinal Plants in the Medicinal Herbs Garden Museum in Barkat Pharmaceutical Town

Mohammadi, director of the Alborz Pharmaceutical Company, said about a $2 billion investment in the production of herbal medicines by the Barakat Foundation. To this end, the specialized zone of medicine and health technologies is under construction in the Barkat Industrial Pharmaceutical Town. He also identified the production of natural health products as the new mission of Barakat Foundation, which follows the production of herbal medicines by launching the Research and Technology Fund.

=== Medicinal Herbs Garden Museum ===
The Medicinal Herbs Garden Museum, located in Barkat Pharmaceutical Town, is a place to introduce and present the achievements of medicine and Medicinal plants in Iran. The site was opened in 2006 on an area of 10,000 square meters. The Garden Museum presents the diversity, plurality, benefits, and Properties of medicinal plants, the history of research on medicinal plants, the history of medicine, the capacities of Iranian medicinal plants, and traditional medicine in Iran for the upcoming scientific movement. For this purpose, various sections have been created to display medical science issues such as timelines, doctors, hospitals, small instruments, showrooms, libraries, large instruments, Fragrances and Medicinal Plants. on 2016, the project won the title of the Department of Public-Cultural Building group in the Iranian Interior Architecture Award.

== See also ==
- Barakat Foundation
- 4030 Call System
- Science and technology in Iran
