= Mobin Trust Consortium =

The Mobin Trust Consortium (Persian: کنسرسیوم توسعه اعتماد مبین:Etemad-e-Mobin) is a company affiliated with the Iranian Revolutionary Guard Corps. As such, it is an economic engine of the Revolutionary Guards that has been used to acquire state monopolies, or other commercial and business interests important to conservative Iranian political groups.

According to the IRIB news agency, quoting the Islamic Revolutionary Guard Corps public relations: Following the measures of the General Staff of the Armed Forces of the Islamic Republic of Iran, the Bonyade-Ta'awon (Cooperative-Foundation) of IRGC transferred its shares from "Etemad-Mobin Development Company" -- which is related to the shareholding of Mobile Telecommunication Company of Iran (Mobile Telecommunication Company of Iran)-- and came out. In regards to the composition of telecommunication shares, Mohammad-Reza Modaresi a member of the consortium said: Mobin Trust Development Consortium consists of two public corporation and one private corporation.

== See also ==
- Telecommunication Company of Iran
- Barakat Foundation
- Execution of Imam Khomeini's Order
