= Bonyad =

Type of charitable trust in Iran

Bonyads (Persian: بنیاد "Foundation") are charitable trusts in Iran that play a major role in Iran's economy. They control an estimated 20% of Iran's GDP, and are second only to the oil industry in manufacturing, trading, and real estate development in Iran. As of 2010, the largest bonyad is the Mostazafan Foundation, worth approximately $10 billion. In addition to large national bonyads like the Mostazafan Foundation, there are numerous bonyads affiliated with local clerics in "almost every" Iranian town. All are answerable only to the Supreme Leader of Iran. As of 2008, bonyads employ somewhere between 400,000 and 5 million Iranians.

Technically religious charitable organizations, they have evolved into "giant private monopolies with no governmental oversight", and are now described as channeling revenues to groups supporting the Islamic Republic, while providing limited and inadequate charity to the poor. Exempt from taxes and benefiting from "huge subsidies from government," they have been called "bloated," and "a major weakness of Iran's economy," that siphons off production to the lucrative black market.

== Background ==
=== Monarchy ===
Founded as royal foundations by Shah Mohammad Reza Pahlavi, the original bonyads were criticized for providing a "smokescreen of charity" to patronage, economic control, for-profit wheeling and dealing done with the goal of "keep[ing] the Shah in Power." Resembling more a secretive conglomerate than a charitable trust, these bonyads invested heavily in property development, such as the Kish Island resort; but the developments' housing and retail was oriented to the middle and upper classes, rather than the poor and needy.

=== Islamic Republic ===
After the 1979 Iranian revolution, the bonyads were nationalized and renamed with the declared intention of redistributing income to the poor and families of martyrs, i.e. those killed in the service of the country. The assets of many Iranians whose ideas or social positions ran contrary to the new Islamic government were also confiscated and given to the bonyads without any compensation.

Today, over 100 bonyads exist, and they are criticized for many of the same reasons as their predecessors. They form tax-exempt, government subsidized, consortiums receiving religious donations and answerable directly (and only) to the Supreme Leader of Iran. The bonyads are involved in everything from vast soybean and cotton fields to hotels to soft drinks to auto-manufacturing to shipping lines. The most prominent, the Bonyad-e Mostazafen va Janbazan, (Foundation for the Oppressed and Disabled), for example, "controls 20% of the country's production of textiles, 40% of soft drinks, two-thirds of all glass products and a dominant share also in tiles, chemicals, tires, foodstuffs."

Some economists argue that its chair, and not the Minister of Finance or president of the Central bank, is considered the most powerful economic post in Iran. In addition to the very large national bonyads, "almost every Iranian town has its own bonyad," affiliated with local clerics.

Estimates of how many people the bonyads employ ranges from in excess of 400,000 to "as many as 5 million."

Bonyads also play a crucial role in the spread of Iranian influence through extensive transnational and international activities, including philanthropy and commerce as soft power as well as providing hard power support.

== Criticism ==
Bonyads are criticized as an enormously wasteful use of Iran's resources: overstaffed, corrupt, and generally unprofitable. In 1999 Mohammad Forouzandeh, a former defense minister, reported that 80% of Iran's Bonyad companies were losing money.

Iran's unprotected private sector has difficulty competing with Bonyad companies, whose political connections provide government permits and subsidies which eliminate worries over the need to make a profit in many market sectors. Thus Bonyads, by their very presence, hamper healthy economic competition, efficient use of capital and other resources, and growth.

=== Unification of Iran's social security system ===
As charity organizations they are supposed to provide social services to the poor and the needy; however, bonyads do not fall under Iran's General Accounting Law and, consequently, are not subject to financial audits. Unaccountable to the Central Bank governor, the bonyads "jealously guard their books from prying eyes." With this lack of information for over 100 bonyads operating independently, "the government doesn't know what, why, how and to whom this help and assistance is given." Lack of proper oversight and control of these foundations has also hampered the government's efforts in creating a comprehensive, central and unified social security system in the country, undertaken since 2003. Iran has 12 million people living below the poverty line, six million of whom are not supported by any foundation or organization.

So as to clearly distinguish its activities from the formal Social Security Organization (SSO), bonyads would have to be in charge of vocational training centers, rehabilitation centers, socioeconomic centers, all drug-related rehabilitation centers, cooperative banking (while financing these activities with the bonyads large commercial holdings, which then could be privatized). The SSO, on the other hand, could have sole responsibility for unemployment-insurance, professional-rehabilitation/training costs, retirement-pensions, disability funds, etc.

Rather than charitable organizations, the bonyads have been described as "patronage-oriented holding companies that ensure the channeling of revenues to groups and milieus supporting the regime," but don't help the poor as a class. Another complaint describes them as having kept to their charitable mission for the first decade of the Islamic Republic, but having "increasingly forsaken their social welfare functions for straightforward commercial activities" since the death of the revolution's founder Ruhollah Khomeini. Local city and town bonyad have been accused of sometimes using extortionate techniques to draw the traditional Shia Islamic 20% khums donations from local business owners.

== List of major bonyads ==
- Mostazafen Foundation of Islamic Revolution, one of the largest welfare organizations, is a semi-public foundation founded in 1979 with the assets of the last Shah's family. It operates a wide variety of charitable activities with a reported $10 billion in assets (2003).
- Astan Quds Razavi, a major religious endowment (waqf) based in Mashhad, oversees the Imam Reza shrine and a large network of economic, charitable, cultural, and social activities, with business ventures estimated to contribute nearly 7 percent of Iran's GDP in 2007.
- NAJA Cooperation Bonyad.
- IRGC Cooperation Bonyad.
- Bonyad Shahid va Omur-e Janbazan (Foundation of Martyrs and Veteran Affairs), one of the biggest with over 100 companies. Provides welfare assistance to families of the Martyrs of the Iran–Iraq War.
- Pilgrimage Foundation.
- Housing Foundation.
- Imam Khomeini Relief Committee, provides sickness, maternity, and work injury benefits to some workers in the private sector.
- Bonyad-e-Barekat (Barakat Foundation).
- Execution of Imam Khomeini's Order (Setad) has a stake in "nearly every sector of the Iranian economy, including energy, telecommunications, and financial services". It adds to its wealth by confiscating "land and property from opponents of the regime, including political opponents, religious minorities, and exiled Iranians". (Barakat Foundation is a subsidiary of Setad).

== See also ==
- Agriculture in Iran
- Banking in Iran
- Economy of Iran
- Energy in Iran
- Healthcare in Iran
- International rankings of Iran
- Iranian labor law
- List of Iranian companies
- Mining in Iran
- Privatization in Iran
- Smuggling in Iran
- Taxation in Iran
- Tourism in Iran
- Transport in Iran
