= Organization for Collection and Sale of State-owned Properties of Iran =

Coordinates: 35°42′35.24″N 51°24′22.28″E

Organization for Collection and Sale of State-owned Properties of Iran (OCSSPI) (Persian: سازمان جمع آوری و فروش اموال تملیکی), founded in 2001, is affiliated to the Ministry of Economic Affairs and Finance of Iran. Its main purpose is to focus all matters relating to the collection, storage, management and sale of properties that by law are under the ownership, possession, custody or management of the government of Iran.

== See also ==
- Setad
