= Fath ol Mobin =

Fath ol Mobin, Fath ol-Mobin or Fath ol Mobīn may refer to

- Fath Olmobin, Iran, a city in Shush County, Khuzestan province, Iran
- Operation Fath ol-Mobin, a 1982 Iranian military operation of the Iran-Iraq War
- Dehnow-e Fath ol Mobin, a village in Iran
- Shahrak-e Fath ol Mobin, a village in Iran
