= Audit Organization of Iran =

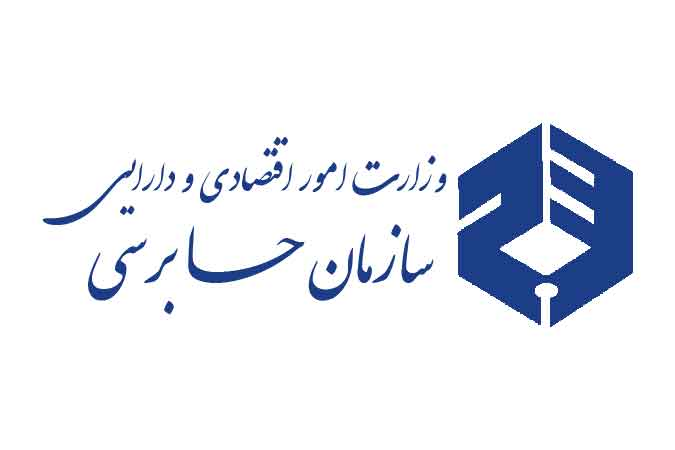
Iran Audit Organization Logo

The Audit Organization of Iran (Persian: سازمان حسابرسی کشور) is one of the organizations affiliated with the Ministry of Economic Affairs and Finance of Iran, which was established in 1987 by the Law on the Establishment of the Audit Organization. As the largest Iranian (governmental) audit institution, this organization provides specialized financial services to government and government-supervised sectors. In addition to auditing and statutory inspections, the Audit Organization is also responsible for financial consulting services, the development of accounting and auditing principles and regulations, and training and research in the field of auditing.

== History of auditing in Iran ==
The first time that auditing was mentioned in official Iranian laws was in the Commercial Law of 1932, which required joint-stock companies to appoint individuals as auditors to examine the accounts and documents and submit a report on the general situation of the company to the general meeting of shareholders. However, this inspection was different from auditing in the modern sense. The Income Tax Law of 1949 introduced the use of professional auditing services for tax audits for the first time, which obliged the Ministry of Finance to accept the results of the work of the Association of Certified Public Accountants. The statute of the Association of Certified Public Accountants was approved in 1963. With the approval of the Direct Tax Law of 1966, it was decided to form the Association of Certified Public Accountants, effectively collapsing the legal basis of the Association of Certified Public Accountants. In 1972, the statute of the Association of Certified Public Accountants was approved and this association began its work.

After the Iranian Revolution of 1979 and the confiscation of companies owned by some capitalists, laws were passed in the Revolutionary Council, based on which many profitable and non-profit companies and institutions were nationalized and placed under government management. In 1970, due to the shortcomings of the existing auditing system, a bill amending some of the legal articles on direct taxes abolished the articles related to certified accountants. As a result, the Institute of Certified Accountants was effectively dissolved. To handle auditing matters, three auditing institutions were established, each of which undertook the auditing of a group of companies and institutions. These were the Auditing Institute of the National Industries Organization, the Auditing Institute of the Mostazafan Foundation (1970), and the Shahed Auditing Institute (1983). In 1983, the Islamic Consultative Assembly approved the merger of these three institutions and the joint-stock auditing company (established in 1977 and responsible for auditing state-owned companies) to form the National Audit Organization. The statute of this organization was approved by the Assembly in 1987, and since then, the Audit Organization has been affiliated with the Ministry of Economic Affairs and Finance with legal personality and financial independence.

== The legal status of accounting and auditing regulation ==
According to Clause 4, Note 2 of the “Law on the Establishment of the Audit Organization” (January 25, 1983) and Articles 6 and 7 of the “Statute of the Audit Organization” (September 17, 1987), the Audit Organization has been entrusted with the task of formulating and generalizing accounting and auditing principles and regulations in Iran. In this regard, the Audit Organization has been enacting the “Accounting and Auditing Principles and Regulations” of Iran since the late 1990s, which are mandatory for all reporting entities and audit firms in Iran.

== Governors ==
Musa Bozorg Asl (November 2024 to present)
Muhammad Jalili (April to November 2024)
Qudratollah Ismaili (March 2022 to April 2024)
Musa Bozorg Asl (March 1397 to March 1401)
Akbar Soheilipour (May 2009 to March 2018)
Kazem Najafi Elmi (September 2007 to May 2009)
Houshang Naderian (2002 to September 2007)
Seyyed Mohammad Reza Fatemi (1992 to 2002)
Reza Mostajeran (1989 to 1992)
