= Iran's 20-year vision plan (Iran 1404) =

Governmental development plan, 2005–2025 AD

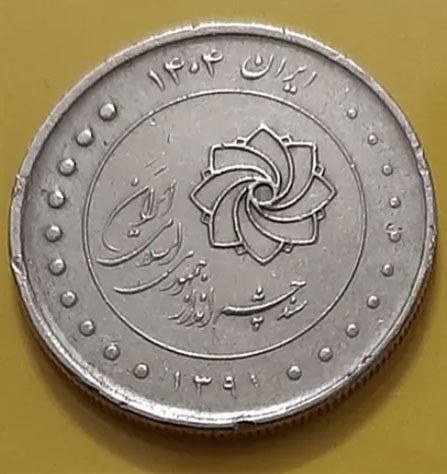
Coin, "Iran 1404", 2012

Iran's 20-year vision plan (Persian: سند چشم انداز بیست ساله جمهوری اسلامی ایران), also known as Vision of the Islamic Republic of Iran in the Horizon of 1404 SH (Persian: سند چشم انداز بیست ساله جمهوری اسلامی ایران در افق ١٤٠٤ ه ش) has been formulated by the Expediency Discernment Council at its own suggestion. The implementation of this vision has been carried out since 2005 and in the form of four 5-year development plans. The year 1404 SH (2025 AD) is the horizon of the vision.

== History ==
In 1996, a 25-year plan called "Iran Vision 1400 document" was approved, according to which, Kazem Najafi Elmi The executive director of this document had said that by 1400, Iran was to be the economic hub of the region, prosperous, independent, and advanced, and to be on par with South Korea in terms of economic and social Index. The Iran Vision 1400 document was later upgraded to the "Iran's 20-year vision plan (Iran 1404)" and announced. Regarding the process of drafting and approving a twenty-year vision document, it should be said that due to the failure of previous vision-type plans in the country since 1997, there was a feeling in the Secretariat of the Expediency Discernment Council that the country's macro-line and strategic policy-making system and its management were flawed and incoherent and lacked consensus goals, and that the general policies of the system were not being formulated in a specific and specific direction. For this reason, in 1999, a discussion entitled "Future Horizon" began in the Secretariat of the Expediency Discernment Council, which became the beginning of drafting the vision document. According to the secretary of this council, after the issue was raised with Seyyed Ali Khamenei, he interpreted this issue as a "missing strategic link" and instructed the Expediency Discernment Council to draw up a twenty-year vision for the country's future. The Expediency Discernment Council also tasked a special commission from its members with compiling this vision, and within a year, the proposed vision was compiled by holding forty meetings of the said commission and with the help of the following groups:

- The Management and Planning Organization of the Islamic Republic of Iran;
- The National Industrial Development Strategy Compilation Group affiliated with the Ministry of Industries and Mines.

The following individuals from the members of the Diagnostic Assembly were part of the commission for compiling the vision document: Mohsen Rezaei, Zanganeh, Habibollah Asgar Oladi, Nabavi, Iravani, Mohammad Hashemi, Ali Akbar Velayati, Majid Ansari and Hossein Mozaffar.

According to Mohsen Rezaei, the secretary of the Expediency Discernment Council, the original vision document was immediately proposed in the Expediency Discernment Council after initial expert reviews and was approved with minimal changes. Kazem Najafi Elmi and Hamid Mirzadeh were responsible for the Iran's 20-year vision plan expert group in the Expediency Discernment Council Secretariat.

== Approval of the document and its notification ==
The assignment of the development of the vision document to the Expediency Discernment Council was made with the argument that since the vision document itself is a form of general policy development of the system, it is within the scope of the council's duties. In any case, the vision document was notified in December 2003 as the country's twenty-year program and titled "Vision of the Islamic Republic of Iran in the Horizon of 1404 SH" by Seyyed Ali Khamenei to the then president, Mohammad Khatami.

== Coinage in anniversary of the Vision Document ==
The Expediency Discernment Council submitted a proposal to the Central Bank to mint a coin Commemorating the Anniversary of the Vision Document to commemorate the Vision Document Week. It was decided that the Banknote and Coin Production Organization, in coordination with the Vision Document Preservation Commission at the council's secretariat, would use the Vision Document symbol for the coinage design. This symbol, representing the eight clauses contained in the document, consists of an eight petalled flower with a circle with the official emblem of the Islamic Republic of Iran in its center.
