= FARAJA Cooperation Bonyad =

Iranian bonyad

NAJA Cooperation Bonyad (Persian: بنیاد تعاون ناجا) is a Bonyad in Iran, under control of Law Enforcement Command of Islamic Republic of Iran.
