= Barakat Foundation =

Charitable trust in Iran

- Company type: Bonyad
- Headquarters: Tehran, Iran
- Key people: Amir-Hossein Madani
- Website: barakatfoundation.com/en/

The Barakat Foundation (Persian: بنیاد برکت lit. The Blessing Foundation) is a charitable trust in Iran (a bonyad) focused on economic development projects in rural areas. It also has stakes in Iran's pharmaceutical industry. It is affiliated to the Execution of Imam Khomeini's Order which is controlled by Seyyed Ali Khamenei.

In 2013, one of its senior officials stated that during the last five years, the foundation had invested more than $1.6 billion in development projects, as well as building 200 schools, 400 homes and health clinics; and “nearly 100 percent of the income of Setad and the Tadbir Group is placed at the disposal” of the foundation; however, these claims are impossible to verify because its accounts are not publicly available.

== History ==
The Barakat Foundation was established on 11 December 2007, two months after Mohammad Mokhber was elected as the leader of Setad, to perform activities in fields of entrepreneurship and the social and economic development in the deprived areas. The foundation was formerly managed by Aref Norouzi. The current manager is Amir Hosein Madani.

Following the statement by Khamenei, the current Supreme Leader of Iran, i.e., “solve the problems of 1,000 villages. It would be good to develop 1,000 places or to build 1,000 schools. Prepare this organisation for this task”, Barakat was created as the affiliated department to Setad. The organization aimed to carry out construction projects in underdeveloped regions of the country as a “Leader's gift to people living in these regions”, according to the IRNA.

== Activity ==
Barakat Foundation aims to provide sustainable employment and facilitate processes in villages. As the head of the foundation's board of directors mentioned, Barakat Foundation is going to provide 10,000 jobs in rural and deprived regions of Iran till March 2019. In Sistan and Baluchestan province, Barakat Foundation is going to establish two factories for packaging and processing dates to support farmers. During five years, Barakat has supported several economic development projects, such as building schools, roads, housing units, and mosques, as well as providing water and electricity. In 2024, 217 job-creating enterprises across the country have been supported by the Barekat Foundation.

The Barekat Foundation, with an investment of 21 trillion tomans in Khuzestan province, is implementing extensive programs aimed at poverty alleviation and job creation. Among its key achievements is the completion of the North Yaran oil field development project, which involved a $585 million investment and has a daily production capacity of 30,000 barrels of crude oil. By utilizing domestic technology and equipment, this project marks a significant step toward self-sufficiency in the oil industry and creates employment opportunities. Furthermore, initiatives are underway to address war-related damages and bolster the resistance economy.

=== Construction of schools ===
According to the report of the International Quran News Agency, the Barkat Foundation has built 2,000 schools in cooperation with the Execution of Imam Khomeini's Order, and the 2,000th school was opened in March 2023. Among its other activities is the operation of 500 water supply projects to 500 deprived villages in the country. Likewise, According to the CEO of this foundation: "Building schools with Iranian Islamic identity is on the agenda of Barkat Foundation."

The Barekat Foundation has contributed to developing educational infrastructure in deprived areas by inaugurating 4,635 schools, converting container schools into permanent ones, establishing vocational schools, distributing stationery packages, and launching educational systems.

=== Health services ===
The Foundation has prepared health services for deprived populations and has supported over 60,000 cancer patients by building an equipped cancer clinic type 3. The Foundation has carried out 482 economic and entrepreneurship projects for 198,000 people who need a job in 31 provinces of the country. Six pharmaceutical companies affiliated to setad, under the administration of the Barakat Foundation is spending their income in for charitable movement.

According to published reports, the establishment of mobile hospitals in various regions, such as the 92-bed mobile Barakat Hospital in Khuzestan, the implementation of support programs for cancer patients and their companions, as well as assisting in equipping infertility treatment centers, are among other initiatives of the Barakat Foundation in the healthcare sector.

==== Telehealth ====
The Barakat Foundation and Execution of Imam Khomeini's Order (in cooperation with the Ministry of Health) have pursued/implemented the issue of Telehealth. According to the Minister of Health, Saeed Namaki: "... This great scientific work helps us to utilize a tool called 'telemedicine' in these (far) areas of the country. This new approach (telemedicine) allows us to increase productivity in the Islamic Republic of Iran's specialized manpower and provide health justice in the farthest areas of Iran. He also added, "It began in the farthest and most deprived parts of the country."

In February 2023, the Barkat Cancer Specialist and Subspecialty Hospital began operations as a state-of-the-art facility dedicated to oncology. This center, recognized as a super-specialized treatment institution, was established with an investment of approximately 1,200 billion Tomans. It offers a comprehensive range of services, including cancer screening, diagnosis, and treatment, while also providing training for specialists and utilizing cutting-edge treatment equipment. Among the advanced technologies employed at this center are linear accelerators, CyberKnife systems, tomotherapy, and CT simulators. These devices have been introduced in a treatment center for the first time in West Asia, enabling precise and personalized treatment options. The center leverages modern technologies and advanced scientific methodologies to enhance the quality of treatment and research services in oncology.

=== Services for Arba'een pilgrims ===
Among the activities of this foundation is related to its participation in infrastructure development and providing services to Arba'een pilgrims at the borders.

=== Projects ===
According to the CEO of Barkat Foundation, 57,000 construction projects have been initiated in Barkat Foundation, and nearly 52,000 of them have come to fruition.

=== COVID-19 Vaccine ===
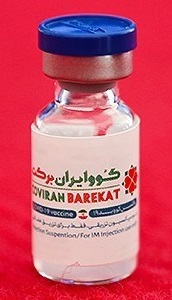
COVIran Barakat (vaccine)

COVIran Barekat, the first COVID-19 vaccine produced by Iranian researchers has been produced by Shifa-Pharmed Company (a subsidiary of Barakat Pharmaceutical Group). The human-injection of the first phase of clinical studies of the Iranian corona vaccine on December 29, 2020; The first phase of human testing of the vaccine began with the injection for 56 volunteers. The second group of the volunteers was also injected with the vaccine. According to the head of the vaccine production team at the Setad, the results show that this vaccine also neutralizes the British mutated COVID-19 virus. The vaccine has passed the phase(s) 2 and 3 of clinical studies; and currently it has reached its final phase. The production line of 25 million doses per month of the vaccine was discharged on 26 April 2021.

With the signing of a memorandum (of understanding) of cooperation between the Barakat Foundation and the Deputy Minister of "Cultural Heritage, Handicrafts and Tourism", the process of creating 3,000 jobs began with the support of 1,000 handicraft production projects, with priority given to the victims of COVID-19. According to the Deputy Coordinator of the Execution of Imam Khomeini's Order: On 27 July 2021, about 5 million doses of Iran Barakat vaccine have been produced in Shafa-farmad factory so far.

According to IRNA, quoting the spokesman of the National Corona Headquarters and the Deputy Minister of "Ministry of Health and Medical Education": "Barakat Iranian vaccine is (also) produced exclusively for Omicron."

=== Services in the Twelve-Day War ===
In July 2025, the Barakat Foundation announced its support for micro, small, and medium-sized businesses impacted by Israel's attacks on Iran.

== Ehsan-Barakat Charity foundation ==
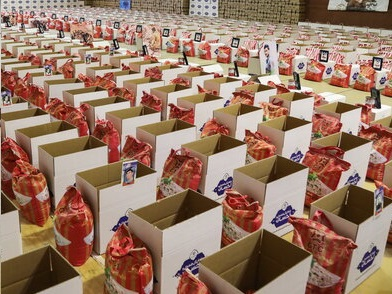
Ehsan Foundation, Distribution of support package

Ehsan-Barakat Charity foundation associated to Execution of Imam Khomeini's Order and Barekat Foundation was founded to request of current Supreme Leader of Iran, Ali Khamenei to provide more quickly help for individual cases (needy people). As Mokhber, the chief of Execution of Imam Khomeini's Order nominated, the activities which be performed by the Charity rely on people's help.

According to Mohammad Vudud Madani, the manager of Ehsan-Barakat in May 2018, 3 trailers equipped with medical equipment and 2 service trailers, as well as 10 tents with a capacity of 140 hospital beds, were prepared and sent to deprived areas. The Charity organized that 8000 needy people who live in deprived areas including Helmand region, Hamoun and Nimroz in Sistan and Baluchestan province, cities from South Khorasan province and Ahmadfedaleh Rural District, travel to Karbala in Arba'een as the special campaign called "the Visa of Paradise".

== Barakat Tel ==
The Barakat Tel Company is one of the companies affiliated with the Execution of Imam Khomeini's Order, funded by Barakat Foundation as a designer and executor of the Electronic Health Program to develop services at the deprived areas of the country in the field of public health. The company provides 18 types of electronic services during the Electronic Health Program.

== Barkat Pharmaceutical Group ==
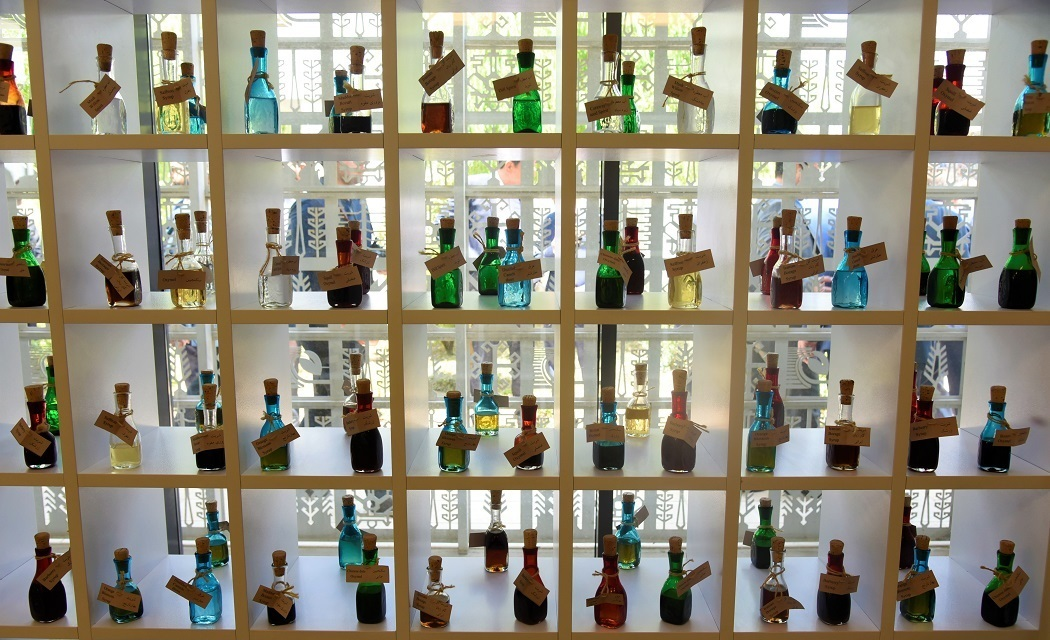
Barakat Industrial Pharmaceutical Town

The Barkat Pharmaceutical Group is a subsidiary of the Setad, which was established in 2010 under the name of "New Technologies of Tedbir Pharmaceutical Technologies".

The company provides services through cooperation with Knowledge enterprises and the world's medical scientists.

== Barkat Ventures ==
Barkat Ventures is part of Setad for New Technologies and the Development of Knowledge Economy. Its duties are introduced based on Iranian-Islamic pattern in establishing and expanding the ecosystem and infrastructure for the development of knowledge and activities of Knowledge enterprise.

== See also ==
- Execution of Imam Khomeini's Order
- Bonyad
- Economy of Iran
- Barkat Ventures
- 15 Khordad Foundation
