= Mobinnet =

Internet service provider in Iran

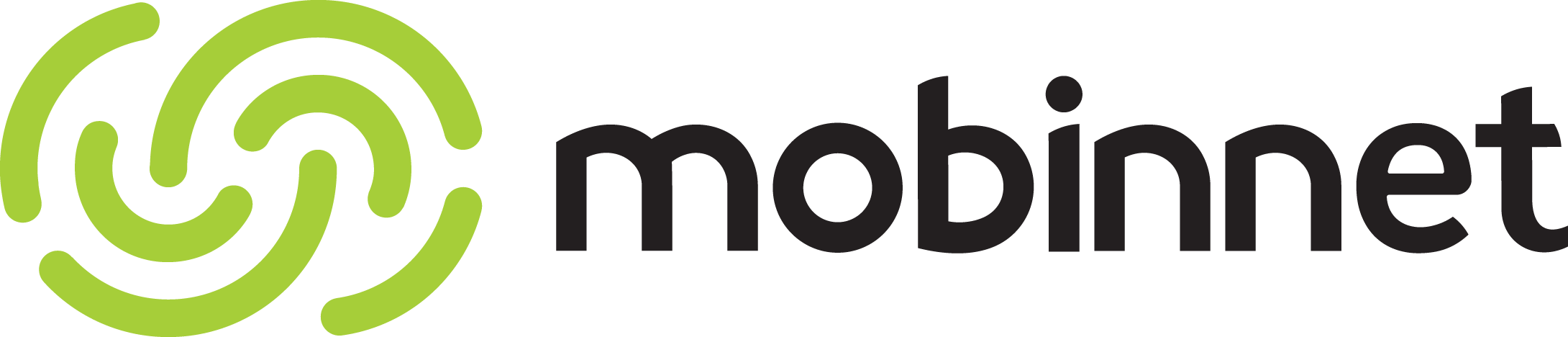
- Company type: Semi Private
- Industry: Telecommunications
- Founded: 2008
- Headquarters: Tehran, Iran
- Area served: Iran
- Services: High-speed TD-LTE Internet, broadband, VPN, data center, IoT
- Parent: Hamrahe Aval (2018–present)
- Website: www.mobinnet.ir

Mobinnet (Persian: مبین نت) is one of the largest Internet service providers of wireless broadband in Iran. It provides high-speed LTE services, connectivity network solutions, dedicated bandwidth, data center, and digital services that connect homes and businesses through an infrastructure across the country. This company was founded in December 2008. On 29 January 2017, it established its nationwide wireless network based on TD-LTE technology.

== Products and services ==
- High-speed TD-LTE Internet
- Broadband Internet
- VPN
- Data center
- Internet of things
