= Mohammad Mokhber =

Iranian politician (born 1955)

- محمد مخبر
- Mokhber in 2024

Acting President of Iran
- In office 19 May 2024 – 28 July 2024
- Supreme Leader: Ali Khamenei
- Vice President: Himself
- Preceded by: Ebrahim Raisi
- Succeeded by: Masoud Pezeshkian

7th First Vice President of Iran
- In office 8 August 2021 – 28 July 2024
- President: Ebrahim Raisi; Himself (acting)
- Supreme Leader: Ali Khamenei
- Preceded by: Eshaq Jahangiri
- Succeeded by: Mohammad Reza Aref

Member of Expediency Discernment Council
- Incumbent
- Assumed office 20 September 2022
- Appointed by: Ali Khamenei
- Chairman: Sadeq Larijani

Advisor and Aide to the Supreme Leader of Iran
- Incumbent
- Assumed office 23 September 2024
- Appointed by: Ali Khamenei

Head of the Execution of Imam Khomeini's Order
- In office 15 July 2007 – 7 December 2021
- Appointed by: Ali Khamenei
- Preceded by: Mohammad Javad Iravani
- Succeeded by: Aref Norouzi (acting); Parviz Fattah

Personal details
- Born: 26 June 1955 (age 71) Dezful, Pahlavi Iran
- Party: Independent; Historical: Mojahedin of the Islamic Revolution Organization
- Other political affiliations: Principlist
- Children: 1

Military service
- Allegiance: Iran
- Branch/service: Islamic Revolutionary Guard Corps
- Years of service: 1980–1988
- Unit: Medical Corps
- Battles/wars: Iran–Iraq War

Mohammad Mokhber (Note: Alternatively spelled Mohammed Mokhber) (Note: Persian: ‌ محمد مخبر, Persian pronunciation: [mohæmmæd moxbeɾ]) (born 26 June 1955) is an Iranian politician who served as the acting president of Iran in 2024 following the death of President Ebrahim Raisi in the Varzaqan helicopter crash, having been the first vice president of Iran from 2021 to 2024 under Raisi. He has been a member of the Expediency Discernment Council since September 2022 and serving as an advisor and aide to the Supreme Leader of Iran since September 2024.

Previously, he was also the head of the Execution of Imam Khomeini's Order committee (EIKO, a.k.a. Setad), an executive at the Mostazafan Foundation, chairman of the board of Sina Bank, deputy governor of Khuzestan Province and CEO of Dezful Telecommunications. During the Iraq-Iran war, he was a medical officer in the Islamic Revolutionary Guard Corps (IRGC), and before the war he was a member of the revolutionary Mansurun Group.

Mokhber's career from young revolutionary to public official is dogged with allegations of corruption, some of which have led to investigations, regarding privatization of Iran's public assets, insider trading, human rights abuses, and affiliation with Iran's nuclear program. These resulted in international sanctions of Mokhber and his affiliate organizations, Sina Bank and Mostazafan. Mokhber is subject to secondary sanctions which limit his global travel and financial liquidity.

Upon Raisi's death, and with the approval of the Supreme Leader of Iran, Mokhber assumed "the powers and functions of the President" as the then-incumbent first vice president. In accordance with the Constitution of Iran, a Temporary Presidential Council consisting of the Acting President, the Speaker of the Assembly, and the Head of Judiciary was formed and a new election date was set for June 28, 2024 with a run-off date of July 5, 2024. Masoud Pezeshkian won the presidential runoff election in July 2024, and was appointed as the President on 28 July 2024.

== Early life and education ==
Mohammad Mokhber was born in Dezful, Iran, on 26 June 1955 to a clerical family. He possesses two doctoral degrees, including a doctorate academic paper (and an MA) in international law; he reportedly has a doctorate degree in management and economic development planning. He also holds an additional MA in management and a bachelor's degree in electrical engineering.

== Career ==
As a teenager, Mokhber helped lay the groundwork for the Iranian Revolution in his home city of Dezful by joining the Mansurun Group, a guerrilla organization which worked to combat the Pahlavi regime. Through Mansurun, he collaborated with prominent figures in the IRGC and current conservative politicians including Ali and Mohammad Jahanara, Ali Shamkhani, Mohsen Rezaei, Mohammad Forouzandeh, Mohammad Baqer Zulqader and Seyed Ahmed Avai. During the Iran-Iraq war, Mokhber became a medical officer with the IRGC in his home town of Dezful. In the 1990s, Mokhber was the CEO of Dezful Telecommunications, then deputy governor of Khuzestan Province.

In the early 2000s Mokhber's influence expanded considerably when he became Vice President of Mostazafan Foundation, the second largest commercial enterprise in Iran behind the state-owned National Iranian Oil Company and biggest holding company in the Middle East. He was additionally made CEO of the foundation's Trade and Transport organization and placed on the board of two entities apparently linked to the foundation: Sina Bank, 84% of which is owned by Mostazafan, and MTN Irancell. While Iranian corporate records are not available to substantiate MTN Irancell's true ownership, a lawsuit filed by Turkcell in 2004 alleges 51% of the company is owned by Mostazafan. Both Sina Bank and MTN Irancell were involved in international scandals concerning activities that took place during Mokhber's tenure, which contributed to sanctions of Mokhber, Sina Bank and Mostazafan (see Corruption and Abuse of Power, and Sanctions).

As chairperson of Sina Bank's board, Mokhber oversaw its financing of Iran's ballistic missile and nuclear programs. This led directly to EU sanctions against both Mokhber and Sina Bank in 2010. In that same year, the U.S. also designated Sina Bank as an Iranian government-owned organization. In 2018 the U.S. Department of Treasury also sanctioned Sina Bank (see Sanctions). On 16 July 2007, Mokhber was appointed head of the EIKO by Iran's Supreme Leader Ali Khamenei. Mokhber's appointment put him at the head of a powerful conglomerate which controls over $95 billion in assets built on "the systematic seizure of thousands of properties belonging to ordinary Iranians," according to Reuters.

Under his leadership, it executed a number of privatization efforts and played an important role in Iran's response to the COVID-19 pandemic. Shortly after Mokhber became EIKO's leader, it established the Barakat Foundation and its subsidiary, the Barakat Pharmaceutical Group. Under Mokhber's EIKO leadership, the Barakat Medical complex promised to develop, manufacture, and deliver 120 million doses of vaccine for $1 billion. It took the money, but only produced 5 million doses (see Corruption and Abuse of Power). As the leader of EIKO, Mokhber also spearheaded multiple privatization efforts, most notably that of 65 subsidiaries of the EIKO and Barakat. In 2019 the U.S. sanctioned Mokhber, EIKO, and its subsidiaries (see Sanctions).

On 8 August 2021, President Ebrahim Raisi appointed Mokhber first vice president of Iran. He is the seventh person to hold the office. Mokhber was the first person selected by former president Ebrahim Raisi after he took office in early August 2021. During his tenure as first Vice President, Mokhber was also appointed to Iran's Expediency Discernment Council, an advisory body to the supreme leader created by Khomenei in 1988.

These appointments placed him in control of multiple facets of the Iranian economy, such as the development of a strategic industrial plan and the promotion of domestic production, and at least one large privatization effort. In January 2023 the expediency discernment council placed him at the head of a seven-man commission tasked with managing the sale of government properties worth approximately $275 million. This commission has incurred allegations of corruption, and generated widespread alarm due to Iran's history of opaque privatization efforts which benefit the security establishment and powerful elites (see Corruption and Abuse of Power).

In addition to economic activities, as first vice president, Mokhber was responsible for the implementation of the Supreme Leader's domestic and foreign policy priorities and conducted diplomatic meetings with public and military officials throughout the region, notably commanders from the Iraqi Popular Mobilization Forces.

== Acting President of Iran (May 2024–July 2024) ==
On 19 May 2024, after the death of President Ebrahim Raisi, Mokhber assumed the role of Acting President of Iran, and was confirmed in his position by Supreme Leader Ali Khamenei on 20 May, until new presidential elections are held. Mokhber attended Raisi's funeral in Tehran on 22 May. He oversaw a scheduled cabinet meeting, in which he announced about the crash at the end of the meeting, according to the government spokesman Ali Bahadori Jahromi. As president, Mokhber made his first public address on 27 May at the meeting of the new Islamic Consultative Assembly which was convened following the 2024 Iranian legislative election, during which he praised Raisi's presidency.

== Corruption allegations ==
In 2003, Mokhber played a pivotal role in convincing the parliament to pass a bill establishing MTN Irancell, Iran's second largest telecommunications company, as a joint venture between the South African MTN group and an Iranian partner, Kowsar Sign Paniz. Mokhber is alleged to have leveraged his position in Mostazafan and Sina Bank to help the MTN joint venture obtain the $31.6 billion contract on the condition that the MTN joint venture assist the Iranian government. This assistance included the acquisition of military equipment prohibited under the UN arms embargo at the time. It also allegedly included agreements that the MTN joint venture would use its influence to sway South Africa's vote on Iran's nuclear program with the International Atomic Energy Agency, and would facilitate funding for internationally designated terrorist organizations including Hezbollah and the IRGC.

Allegations of corruption in the contract award process resulted in two international lawsuits filed in following years, detailed below. The first lawsuit was filed in 2004 by Turkcell, a competitor for the award. It alleged that MTN had offered bribes to secure the contract. Although the lawsuit eventually turned in favor of Irancell, it brought about the arrest in 2019 of Pretoria's former ambassador to Iran on charges that they accepted a bribe in exchange for support of MTN's receipt of the contract. Fallout from the arrest also prompted the early retirement of the CEO of MTN Irancell, Ali-Reza Ghalambor Dezfouli. A later lawsuit filed in 2021 by the United States linked MTN Irancell to the funding and arming of terrorist groups, directly contributing to American casualties between 2011 and 2016.

Under Mokhber's leadership at EIKO, its subsidiary company the Barakat Pharmaceutical Group promised to develop, manufacture and deliver 120 million doses of a domestic COVID-19 vaccine, COVIran Barakat, in exchange for $1 billion. The conglomerate took the money, but only produced ~5 million doses. Each dose is reported to have been again sold to the government of Iran, who had already paid US$1 billion, for 200,000 tomans per dose. According to an official report by the Iranian Ministry of Health, less than 10% of the total vaccines injected in the country were domestic.

While undertaking his duties as first vice president, Mokhber signed a letter on 17 May 2023 which contained critical information about an increase in the petrochemical feed rate from 5,000 to 7,000 tomans. This information should have been made public immediately. Instead, it was kept secret for more than 50 days, during which time shareholders close to Mokhber sold stocks and related assets. The public announcement on 6 July caused a significant sell-off in the stock market, leading to a loss of trust among small shareholders and a substantial drop in the stock market index. Senior capital market expert Mehdi Rozbahani criticized the lack of transparency and the misuse of information, which enabled a small group of individuals to benefit at the expense of ordinary investors.

A letter written by Ahmad Tavakkoli in 2023 acknowledged that Mokhber and a team of six other people were appointed to direct a new privatization plan, the stated purpose of which was to generate income for the Iranian government from "unused or low-productivity public assets." According to the letter, the seven-person team would collect a sales fee of up to 5%. From the sale of 108 thousand billion tomans of government property, MOkhber and his team of managers could turn a profit of 5400 billion tomans. In an incident recorded by a civilian bystander in late 2023, Mokhber's bodyguards resorted to firing shots to disperse a peaceful protest in his presence in Ahvaz, Iran. As vice president, Mokhber has helped facilitate Iran's drone sales to Russia and to non-state actors, and is a principal player in finding customers for Iranian arms. In October 2022, he was sent to Moscow along with senior IRGC officials and a Supreme National Security Council official to finalize an agreement to send Shahed drones and surface-to-surface missiles to Russia to support its invasion of Ukraine.

== Family ==
Ali-Reza Mokhber, Mohammad Mokhber's brother, is the current CEO of Khuzestan Steel Factory. He has been criticized for his lavish lifestyle. Mokhber's son, Sajjad Mokhber, is the chairperson of at least seven companies. Several of these are subsidiary companies of Pasargad Bank, a Tehran-based investment bank. Sajjad is one of Pasargad Bank's largest debtors. Mokhber's cousin, Mohammad Reza Mokhber, is an Iranian politician and a lecturer at the University of Tehran. He holds a doctorate from Tehran University and served as the secretary of the Supreme Council of Cultural Revolution from 2004 to 2017.

== Sanctions ==
In July 2010, the European Union included Mokhber, then the president of EIKO, in a list of persons and entities it was sanctioning for alleged involvement in the issue of "nuclear or ballistic missiles activities." In 2012, Mokhber was removed from the list. In 2021, Mokhber was sanctioned by the United States over EIKO's role in violating “the rights of dissidents by confiscating land and property from opponents of the regime” and other human rights abuses. In 2010, the U.S. also designated Sina Bank as “owned or controlled by the Government of Iran.” The U.S. sanctioned Sina Bank in 2018 under counterterrorism authority Executive Order (E.O.) 13224 following revelations that Sina Bank financed the Basij, a paramilitary unit within the IRGC and U.S.-designated terrorist organization.

On 24 January 2019 the U.S. Department of the Treasury added Mokhber, EIKO and its subsidiaries to its sanctions list, stating that EIKO controls a sizable portion of Iran's economy, including assets confiscated from political opponents and religious minorities for the benefit of senior Iranian government officials. In November 2020 the U.S. also sanctioned Mostazafan, stating that it expropriates wealth from Iranian citizens.

== Notes ==
Political offices
Preceded by Ebrahim Raisi	President of Iran; Acting; 19 May 2024 – 28 July 2024	Succeeded by Masoud Pezeshkian
