= Shahrak-e Fath ol Mobin =

Shahrak-e Fath ol Mobin شهرك فتح المبين
- Village
- Location within Iran
- Coordinates: 28°48′49″N 54°31′53″E
- Country: Iran
- Province: Fars
- County: Darab
- Bakhsh: Central
- Rural District: Balesh

Population (2006)
  - Total: 1,487
- Time zone: UTC+3:30 (IRST)
  - Summer (DST): UTC+4:30 (IRDT)

Shahrak-e Fath ol Mobin (Persian: شهرك فتح المبين, also Romanized as Shahrak-e Fatḩ ol Mobīn) is a village in Balesh Rural District, in the Central District of Darab County, Fars province, Iran. At the 2006 census, its population was 1,487, in 332 families.
