= Anti-Cancer Drugs =

- Discipline: Oncology
- Language: English
- Edited by: Mels Sluyser

Publication details
- History: 1990–present
- Publisher: Lippincott Williams & Wilkins
- Frequency: 10/year
- Impact factor: 1.784 (2014)

Standard abbreviations
- ISO 4: Anti-Cancer Drugs

Indexing
- ISSN: 0959-4973 (print); 1473-5741 (web)

Links
- Journal homepage

Anti-Cancer Drugs is an international medical journal, which aims to promote and encourage research on anti-cancer agents. It was first published in 1990 and it includes reports on clinical and experimental research results, from conventional cytotoxic chemotherapy to hormonal or biological response modalities. The journal has 10 issues per year and the current editor in chief is Mels Sluyser. According to the 2014 Journal Citation Reports, the journal has an impact factor of 1.784, ranking it 164th out of 211 in the category Oncology and 162nd out of 254 in the category Pharmacology & Pharmacy.
