= Mobile Communications of Iran =

Mobile network operator in Iran

Mobile Communications of Iran (MCI) Hamrah-e Avval
- Native name: شرکت ارتباطات سیار ایران (همراه اول)
- Type: Semi-private
- Traded as: TSE: HMRZ1; ISIN: IRO1HMRZ0007
- Industry: Telecommunications; Mobile Network Operator
- Founded: 1992; 34 years ago
- Headquarters: Tehran, Iran
- Area served: Iran
- Key people: Mehdi Akhavan Behabadi (CEO); Babak Tarakomeh (Member of the Board)
- Products: Fixed-line and mobile telephony, Internet services, broadband and fixed-line internet services, digital television and network services, and global Internet Protocol backbone network
- Owner: TCI (84.15%); Sukuk (5.91%)
- Number of employees: 5000+
- Parent: TCI
- Subsidiaries: mobinnet
- Website: www.mci.ir/web/en/home

Mobile Communications of Iran (Persian: شرکت ارتباطات سیار ایران, Šerkat-e Ertebâtât-e Sayyâr-e Irân), commonly abbreviated as MCI and also known under its brand name Hamrah-e Avval (Persian: همراه اول; the first companion), is the first and largest Mobile network operator in Iran. MCI is a subsidiary of the and has approximately 17 million postpaid and 49 million prepaid subscribers. Hamrahe Aval's service is available in 1,239 cities and over 70,000 kilometers of highway in Iran is sheet. It provides roaming services via 271 partner operators in more than 112 countries.

In December 2010, 5.5% of the MCI shares were offered on the Iranian over-the-counter market (Farabourse), at a value of $396 million.

In August 2013, the company moved from the OTC to the Tehran Stock Exchange

90% of MCI's shares are owned by the Telecommunication Company of Iran, and the remaining 10% of shares are public at the Tehran Stock Exchange.

In 2015, MCI launched 3G, and 4G technologies by a new brand name as Notrino.

== History ==
By the end of March 2004, the number of the subscribers grew up to 3,450,000 subscribers; the number of subscribers is more than 43 million today (the number of subscribers of Hamrah-e-Avval). In addition, Hamrah-e Avval has also provided proper coverage over more than 52,000 km of countrywide road networks and 1120 cities throughout the country. In line with 3rd Socio-Economic and Cultural Development of the Islamic Republic of Iran, a number of 4,590,000 new subscriptions were added to the network which in turn shows 934.8% increase and the penetration rate was increased from 0.78% at the beginning of the 3rd Socio-Economic and Cultural Development of the Islamic Republic of Iran to 7.5% by the end of the Plan.

The special services provided to the subscribers are call transfer, call waiting, caller ID, FDN services, call restriction, fax connection, data services, SMS and VMS systems, and international roaming.

=== Evolution of the mobile telephone in the world ===
As a personal communication means, the telephone network has the highest application in the world. The possibility of provision of mobile phone has emerged in 1960 in Scandinavian states (Sweden, Norway, Denmark and Finland) in 1960s. The USA introduced the Nordic Mobile Telephone (NMT) to the market in 1983. In 1986 the international information network, Internet, was launched as the most extensive international information system and in 1987 narrow bandwidth was selected; in the same year, 13 European states entered into memorandum of understanding on due implementation of GSM specifications by all the MOU parties.

== History of Mobile Telephones in Iran and the Current Situation ==
The development of mobile telecommunications in Iran began in 1994, following a proposal from the Ministry of Communications and Information Technology (ICT). In a meeting held on August 4, 2004, the Council of Ministers approved the reorganization of the Distance Measurement Center, establishing the Mobile Communication Company of Iran. This decision was based on the ICT’s proposal No. 100/13897 and was in accordance with the provisions of Articles (2) and (4) of the Third Socio-Economic and Cultural Development Plan of the Islamic Republic of Iran (2000), as well as the Higher Administrative Council’s approval under No. 1901/76016 dated July 15, 2003.

Iran's mobile phone network launched in 1994 with an initial infrastructure comprising 176 transmitters and receivers distributed across 24 stations, serving 9,200 mobile numbers. The high demand for mobile services led to rapid expansion. By March 2006, the number of mobile subscribers had increased to 15.9 million, and coverage had expanded beyond Tehran to include several other cities.

The growth of the mobile phone system continued in the subsequent years. By March 2004, the number of subscribers had reached 3.4 million, and the network's coverage had expanded to 667 cities. By 2023, the mobile phone network in Iran had more than 43 million subscribers, providing coverage in over 1,120 cities and along a road network stretching over 47,000 kilometers. The mobile penetration rate in Iran is approximately 55% of the population, and roaming services are available in more than 110 countries.

This rapid expansion of mobile telephony in Iran highlights its increasing role in communication infrastructure and services across the country.

== Hamrah-e Aval Rebrands After 30 Years ==
Hamrah-e Aval ("The First Companion"), Iran's largest mobile network operator, unveiled its new brand identity on Monday, February 26, 2024, during a special ceremony marking its 30th year of operation. The new visual identity for Hamrah-e Aval is both modern and bold, signifying a fundamental transformation within the company. The updated colors and new brand mark convey an inclusive and dynamic world, where modern communications foster cohesion and convergence. The slogan "No one is alone" has been retained as part of the brand identity due to its conceptual strength and profound social impact. The new logo design incorporates highly recognizable elements, intended to evoke a sense of entering a new gateway to the future. Hamrah-e Aval's visual identity has shifted towards a monochromatic scheme, with blue, inspired by the sky, chosen to convey a sense of trust. The Persian script in the logo has also undergone changes, with both English and Persian elements now integrated. The font used in the logo was custom-designed specifically for Hamrah-e Aval. Hamrah-e Aval's brand revitalization extends beyond superficial changes, symbolizing the operator's commitment to delivering advanced and sustainable communication services, digital innovations, and an enhanced user experience. This transformation reflects profound shifts in the company's business nature, mission, and values. It has been undertaken to strengthen the brand's position in the telecommunications market, emphasizing innovation, quality, and social responsibility.

== Business Activities of Hamrah Aval ==
- Telecommunications Infrastructure Development: Hamrah Aval is actively involved in the construction, import, establishment, operation, and expansion of systems for transmitting voice, text, data, and other forms of information. These activities are conducted both independently and through partnerships with domestic and international entities.
- Production of Hardware and Software: The company manufactures various devices, including hardware, software, and network solutions. These products are available for sale or lease, meeting a wide range of telecommunications needs.
- Provision of Network-Based Services: Hamrah Aval offers a variety of network-based services, encompassing both physical and virtual services. These include voice, text, and data transmission, along with electronic commerce and payment solutions, all in compliance with relevant regulations.
- Content and Data Transmission Services: Hamrah Aval provides services focused on content and data transmission, supporting the seamless transfer of voice, text, and other forms of information.
- Technical Standards and Guidelines: The company prepares and approves technical standards and guidelines necessary for establishing, developing, maintaining, and operating mobile communication networks.
- Collaboration with Other Operators: Hamrah Aval collaborates with other telecom operators in exchanging communications, traffic transit, roaming services, and shared resource utilization.
- Training and Research Initiatives: The company manages and implements specialized training programs and research to develop essential skills and drive technological innovation.
- Contracting and Agreements: Hamrah Aval engages in various types of contracts and agreements, facilitating strategic partnerships and expanding service offerings.
- Loans and Investment: The company secures loans and investments from domestic and foreign sources and undertakes independent investments or collaborations, establishing new companies or partnering with existing ones while adhering to market regulations.
- Intellectual Property and Technology Transfer: Hamrah Aval acquires and issues patents and trademarks, advancing technology production and transfer efforts.
- Legal Representation and Advocacy: The company undertakes legal representation and services related to the above activities and other relevant matters.
- Domestic and International Activities: Hamrah Aval conducts various technical, commercial, research, and advertising activities aligned with its business objectives.

== See also ==
- Mobile phone market in Iran
