= Iranian Journal of Immunology =

- Discipline: Immunology
- Language: English

Publication details
- History: 2004–present
- Frequency: Quarterly

Standard abbreviations
- ISO 4: Iran. J. Immunol.

Links
- Journal homepage

The Iranian Journal of Immunology is a quarterly peer-reviewed medical journal that covers research on aspects of immunology. It is published by the Shiraz Institute for Cancer Research (Shiraz University of Medical Sciences) in association with the Iranian Society for Immunology.

== Abstracting and indexing ==
The Iranian Journal of Immunology is abstracted and indexed by MEDLINE/PubMed, EMBASE, EMNursing, GEOBASE, Cambridge Scientific Abstracts, Chemical Abstracts, Global Health, Index Medicus for Eastern Mediterranean Region, and Scopus.
