= Telecommunication Company of Iran =

Iranian telecommunication company

- Company type: Public
- Traded as: TSE: MKBT1; ISIN: IRO1MKBT0008
- Industry: Telecommunications
- Founded: 1971
- Headquarters: Tehran, Iran
- Key people: Majid Soltani (CEO); Ebrahim Mahmoudzadeh (Chairman)
- Number of employees: 54,000
- Subsidiaries: MCI
- Website: https://en.tci.ir

Telecommunication Company of Iran, or TCI (Persian: شرکت مخابرات ایران, romanized: Sherkat-e Moxāberāt-e Irān), is the fixed-line incumbent operator in Iran offering services in fixed telephony, DSL and data services for both residential and business customers, all throughout the country. It was established in 1971 with a new organizational structure as the main responsible administration for the entire telecommunication affairs.

TCI maintains 30 provincial subsidiaries and two brands - MCI (Hamrahe Avval or Mobile Company of Iran) and FCI (Ashenaye Avval or Fixed-line Company of Iran) that provide fixed-line telephone service, data services, mobile services, high-speed internet and soon wireless services. About 99% of the fixed-line telephone subscribers and 61% of the mobile subscribers in Iran belong to TCI's affiliates.

By 2008 TCI employed 38,000 permanent employees—13,500 of which are slated to retire during the next three years—and about 45,000 temporary employees through private subcontractors, which will no longer be used after privatization (March 2009).

On 2016 the Director of TCI announced the merger of its provincial subsidiaries and the MCI into a single business unit that allow to utilize the powerful synergies and maintain leading positions on the national telecoms market.

TCI has utilized equipment and services such as digital switching centers, optical fiber cables, mobile phones, data networks, satellite services, and telephone special services. TCI manufactures more than 80% of the required equipment inside Iran.

Iran Telecommunication Industries (ITI) was also founded in the same year to manufacture the required equipment for the national long-distance network. TCI has monopoly over Iran's fixed line infrastructure, and it was until 2010, Iran's largest cellular operator (MCI) and Internet service provider and data communication operator (DCI). As of November 2010, MCI accounts for more than 70% of TCI's profit.

TCI is exporting technical and engineering services, as well as consulting and contracting services. It is also responsible for censoring most of the internet in Iran, as serves as a bottleneck for the monitoring of all communications.

== Privatization and IPO ==
Privatization Organization has forecast that shares of Telecommunication Company of Iran (TCI) will be floated in the stock market by late September 2007.

In March 2007, TCI and its provincially affiliated companies received the government's permission to be privatized. TCI's Infrastructure Telecom Company will be detached from it and would continue its activities as a part of the ICT Ministry. Close to 33 companies in the telecom sector are expected to be privatized.

In September 2007, the Ministry of ICT announced that 51% of TCI would be privatized before the end of the Iranian calendar year on 20 March 2008. As a forerunner to the sale of a controlling stake in TCI, a 5% stake in the operator was scheduled be floated on the Tehran Stock Exchange before the end of December 2007. The flotation of this minority stake did not take place as planned, and in January 2008 it was reported that TCI would first have to be established as a fully licensed telecoms service provider.

In April 2008, TCI Chairman Saber Feizi said that the various affiliated companies were interconnected in such a way as to make it impossible to separate them when the company is eventually offered for sale on the Tehran Stock Exchange. Feizi, therefore, stressed that TCI would be sold along with all its subsidiaries, including mobile business unit Mobile Communications Company of Iran (MCI).

In September 2009, Mobin Trust Consortium along with Tose'e Etemad Investment Company and Sina Bank won the tender for TCI (50% + one share) for $7.8 billion. Among its major investors were IRGC Co-op Foundation, Mostazafan Foundation, and Execution of Imam's Order company. The Government Ministry retained the remaining 40%, TCI employees held 5% and the last 5% shares worth of 344 billion Rials were sold on the Tehran Stock Exchange in just 8 minutes. In November 2009, the consortium paid 1564 billion tomans for the 50 percent of the shares in the Telecommunication Company priced over 7000 billion tomans with rest of the amount to be paid within next eight years. This was the biggest acquisition in the history of Iran's stock market.

In October 2018, an IRGC unit in charge of the body's economic operations announced it has left Iran's telecommunications industry, after selling its share in a consortium controlling Iran's top telecoms companies and biggest mobile phone operator. The military had previously been asked to withdraw from the economy, by selling its businesses, by both Supreme Leader Ali Khamenehi and President Hassan Rohani.

== License ==
Minister of ICT gave TCI an ultimatum in July 2023 to merge its provincial subsidiaries, permanently contract veterans, separate local internet traffic, improve PCM parameter or lose its license and sell its network. The corporation questioned Minister's 20 million FTTH port coverage program.

== Foreign projects ==
Iran's Ministry of Communication and Information Technology along with TCI are developing the landline telephone network in the towns of Karbala and Najaf in Iraq.

== Added value apps ==
It runs a streaming service fam.ir.

== Business indicators ==
Major business indicators of TCI by May 2015 are:

- Fixed-line subscribers: 29.4 million
- Fixed-line penetration rate: 38 percent
- Mobile subscribers: 63 million
- Mobile penetration rate: 80.5 percent
- Internet users: 41 million
- Telecom service connected villages: 53 thousand
- Mobile communication covered roads: 72 thousand Kilometers
- Mobile communication covered villages: 45 thousand

== TCI's main subsidiaries ==
- Iran Telecommunication Manufacturing Company (ITMC) - owned by TCI (45%), Industry Bank (35%) and Siemens (20%)
- Iran Telecommunication Industries (ITI) - ITI was established in 1973 in Shiraz as a fully owned subsidiary of TCI. Within the past 20 years ITI has equipped the telecommunications network, manufactured the analogue and digital transmission equipment, and has also contributed to the communications developments in Iran. As of 2001, ITI employed over 2000 staff. The company is responsible for maintaining and expanding Iran's telecom network and providing all the necessary hardware and software in this field.
- Telecommunication Network Planning and Development Company, renamed to Telecommunication Infrastructure Company
- Optical Fiber and Solar Cell Fabrication Company
- Shahid Ghandi Communication Cables Co.
- Data Communications of Iran (DCI) - DCI maintains the network infrastructure, providing Internet access via the IRANPAK X.25 packet-switching network, which covers most major cities. DCI is the only ISP with a permit for supplying government agencies. DCI supplies both dial-up and leased lines to its users.

== See also ==
- Communications in Iran
