= Journal of Medical Virology =

- Discipline: Virology
- Language: English
- Edited by: Hinh Ly

Publication details
- History: 1977–present
- Publisher: Wiley-Blackwell
- Frequency: Monthly
- Impact factor: 12.7 (2022)

Standard abbreviations
- ISO 4: J. Med. Virol.

Indexing
- CODEN: JMVIDB
- ISSN: 0146-6615 (print); 1096-9071 (web)
- LCCN: 77643154
- OCLC no.: 2988328

Links
- Journal homepage; Online access; Online archive

The Journal of Medical Virology is a monthly peer-reviewed medical journal covering fundamental and applied research concerning viruses which affect humans. It is published by Wiley-Blackwell and was established in 1977. The current editor-in-chief is Dr. Hinh Ly (University of Minnesota, Twin Cities).

== Abstracting and indexing ==
The journal is abstracted and indexed in:

- Abstracts in Anthropology
- AGRICOLA
- Aquatic Sciences & Fisheries Abstracts
- Elsevier BIOBASE/Current Awareness in Biological Sciences
- Biological Abstracts
- BIOSIS Previews
- CAB Abstracts
- CAB HEALTH
- Chemical Abstracts Service
- CSA Biological Sciences Database
- CSA Environmental Sciences & Pollution Management Database
- Current Contents/Clinical Medicine
- Current Contents/Life Sciences
- EMBASE
- Global Health
- Index Medicus/MEDLINE/PubMed
- Index Veterinarius
- Neurosciences Abstracts
- PASCAL
- Science Citation Index
- Scopus
- VINITI Database RAS

According to the Journal Citation Reports, the journal has a 2021 impact factor of 20.693, ranking it 2nd out of 37 journals in the "Virology" category.
