= COVIran Barekat =

COVIran Barakat vaccine against COVID-19

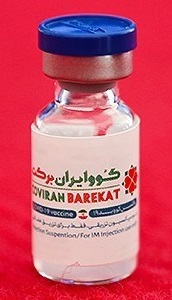
- A vial of COVIran Barakat

Vaccine description
- Target: SARS-CoV-2
- Vaccine type: Inactivated

Clinical data
- Other names: BIV1-CovIran; COVIran Barakat; COVIran Barkat کووایران برکت
- Routes of administration: Intramuscular
- ATC code: None

Legal status
- Legal status: Emergency use authorization: IRN; Full and emergency authorizations Full list of COVIran Barekat authorizations

Identifiers
- CAS Number: 2698354-65-1

COVIran Barekat (Persian: کووایران برکت) is a COVID-19 vaccine developed in Iran by Shifa Pharmed Industrial Group, a subsidiary of the Barkat Pharmaceutical Group. It is an inactivated virus-based vaccine. Iranian authorities have authorized its emergency use. This makes it the first locally developed COVID-19 vaccine to be approved for emergency use in the Middle East.

Officials in charge say they are in the process to publish the results of the clinical trials in a peer-reviewed journal. The interim results of the phases 1 and 2 trials showed 93.5% (95% CI, 88.4–99.6%) of the receivers of the vaccine have produced neutralizing antibodies against SARS-CoV-2. Those results have not been peer-reviewed and describe the immunogenicity of the vaccine and not its efficacy. On 3 March 2022, peer-reviewed results have been published in the Clinical Microbiology and Infection.

As of February 27, 2022, approximately 60 million doses have been produced according to Shifa Pharmed's CEO. and the annual production capacity of this vaccine has reached 350 million doses. Multiple Iranian personalities have received the vaccine, including the previous Supreme Leader of iran, Ali Khamenei and the former President, Ebrahim Raisi.

A version of the vaccine based on the Omicron variant and named CovIran Barkat Plus is in development and studied to be given as a third dose.

== Medical uses ==
It is given by intramuscular injection and requires two doses given 28 days apart.

== Pharmacology ==
COVIran Barekat is an inactivated virus-based vaccine. In other words, "it is made of a coronavirus that has been weakened or killed by chemicals, similar to how polio immunizations are made".

== Developers ==
The Execution of Imam Khomeini's Order (EIKO) and Barkat Pharmaceutical Group is parent company of Shifa Pharmed Industrial Group. It's reported to be "state-affiliated". Shifa Pharmed products include seven drugs and three biologics besides their COVID-19 vaccine which is their first vaccine to be produced. Around 650 people worked in three shifts, around the clock, to develop the vaccine.

Dr. Minoo Mohraz has been selected as the lead of the "Corona vaccine project in Iran". Mohraz is an Iranian physician, scientist, and AIDS specialist. She is a full professor (emeritus) of infectious diseases at Tehran University of Medical Sciences and head of the Iranian Centre for HIV/AIDS. Mohraz has also served, within the World Health Organization, as an expert on HIV/AIDS in Iran and the Eastern Mediterranean.

== Manufacturing ==
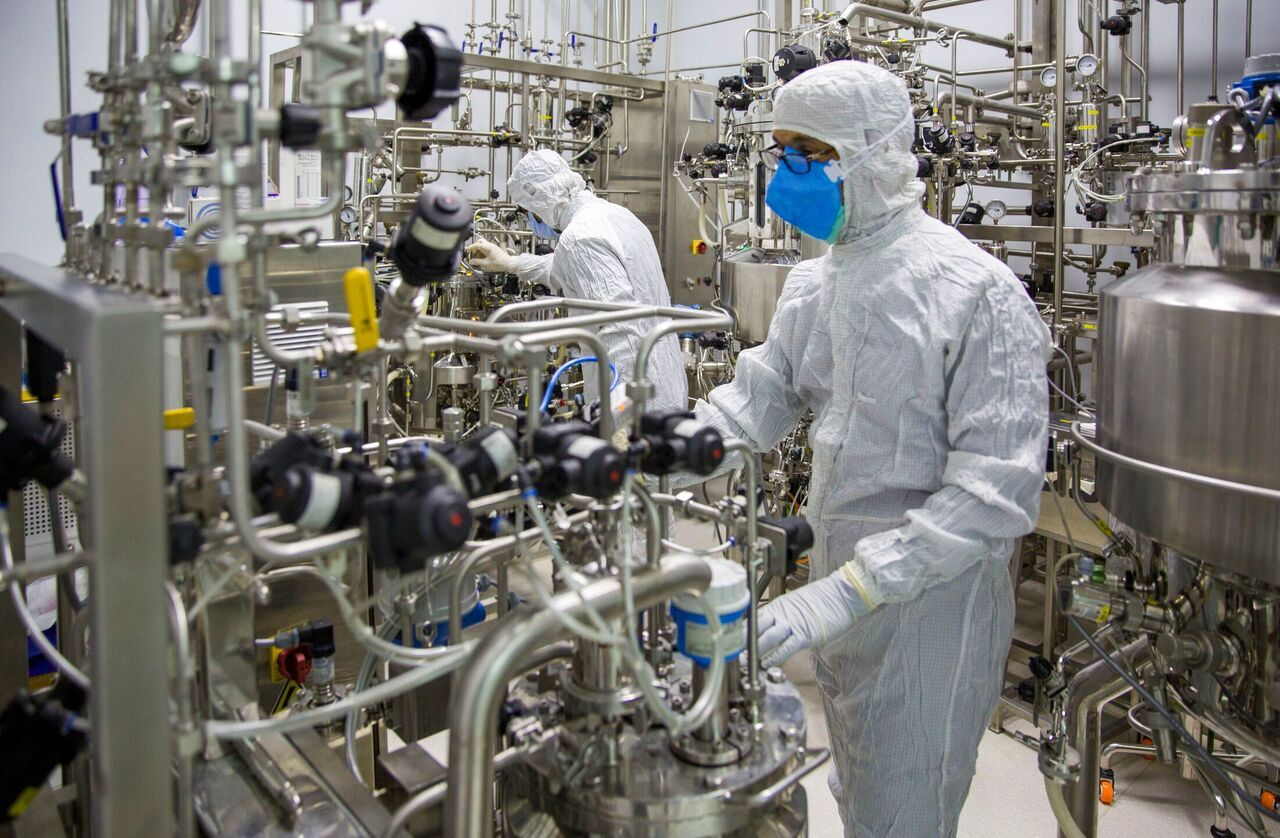
First production line, March 2021

Barkat Pharmaceutical Group started constructing a factory for vaccine production on 17 December 2020 with the goal to build it in 3 months. According to Execution of Imam Khomeini's Order (EIKO), under the direct control of the Supreme Leader of Iran, "production of the vaccine developed by one of its companies, Shifa Pharmed, could reach 12 million doses per month, six months after a successful trial ends".

Mass production began on 15 March 2021. The first produced batch was unveiled on 10 May 2021.

There are three production lines for COVIran Barekat.

- Cumulate production capacity will be 25-30 million doses per month when all lines will start producing.
- The first line has a capacity of 3-4 million doses per month and started producing as of 15 March 2021.
- The second line has a capacity of 6-8 million doses per month. On 17 August, it was in the process of producing its first batch.
- The third line has a capacity of 16-20 million doses per month. On 17 August, 95% of its equipment were reported to be prepared and installed and officials in charge aimed to begin its operation as of end of September.

By 3 July 2021, about 2.7 million doses of COVIran Barekat vaccine had been produced and 400,000 doses had been delivered to the Iranian Ministry of Health, according to Mohammad Mokhber, the Deputy Coordinator of the Execution of Imam Khomeini's Order.

By 27 July 2021, about 5 million doses had been produced and 1.3 million had been delivered to the Ministry of Health, according to Mokhber.

By 30 August 2021, about 8 million doses had been produced and 4.2 million had been delivered to the Ministry of Health, according to EIKO.

By 10 October 2021, about 16 million doses have been produced and 7.5 million had been delivered to the Ministry of Health, according to Shifa Pharmed's CEO.

By 26 February 2022, about 60 million doses have been produced, according to Shifa Pharmed's CEO.

=== Support from the Leader of Iran ===
After receiving the first dose of the Iran Barakat COVID-19 vaccine,the Leader of Iran emphasized the need to preserve this "national pride," considered the use of the domestic vaccine to be a source of public confidence, and introduced the acquisition of this indigenous knowledge as a symbol of "self-confidence" and jihadi work to overcome challenges.

== History ==
=== Preclinical trials ===
The results of the preclinical study conducted on animals have been published in a preprint (not peer reviewed) on 10 June 2021. According to the developers of the vaccine, trials showed that the vaccine was safe and effective in animals. On 26 October 2021, the results of the preclinical study have been published in the peer-reviewed Journal of Medical Virology.

=== Clinical trials ===
Clinical trials are tests done in humans, to see whether a treatment is safe and effective. There are different phases of clinical research, and each phase has its own primary focus. For example, the focus of Phase I clinical trials is basic safety and dose information. All studies were randomized, double-blind, parallel arms, placebo-controlled and have been conducted on healthy volunteers.

Clinical trials of COVIran Barekat vaccine
Phase	Registration		Number of participants				Age of participants	Ref
Phase	Number	Date	Total	Vaccine	Placebo	Ratio vaccine/ placebo	Age of participants	Ref
Trials on adults
I	IRCT20201202049567N1	15 December 2020	56	24 (3 μg) 24 (5 μg)	8	7:1	18–50 years	
I	IRCT20201202049567N2	13 March 2021	32	24	8	3:1	51–75 years	
II	IRCT20201202049567N3	13 March 2021	280	224	56	5:1	18–75 years	
III	IRCT20201202049567N3	21 April 2021	20,000	13,333	6,666	2:1	18–75 years	
Trials on children
I	IRCT20171122037571N3	11 November 2021	60	30	30 (Sinopharm BIBP vaccine)	1:1	12–18 years	
II	IRCT20171122037571N3	11 November 2021	440	220	220 (Sinopharm BIBP vaccine)	1:1	12–18 years	

==== Phase I ====
Iran Food and Drug Administration has approved the vaccine for testing on humans. According to reports, more than 65,000 Iranians volunteered to test the vaccine while only 56 people were needed.

On 29 December 2020, human trials of Iran's first domestic COVID-19 vaccine candidate were started. The first volunteer who received a shot of COVIran Barekat was Tayyebeh Mokhber, the daughter of Mohammad Mokhber, director of Setad. Minister of Health Saeed Namaki and Vice President for Science and Technology Sorena Sattari participated at the ceremony of vaccine injection.

Phase 1's primary outcome was safety assessment. A first phase 1 study was conducted on 56 healthy volunteers who were at the age of 18–50. Last injections of the second doses occurred on 4 March 2021. A second phase 1 study was conducted on 32 volunteers aged 51–75 years. First injections occurred on March 15 and last injections on April 9.

==== Phase II/III ====
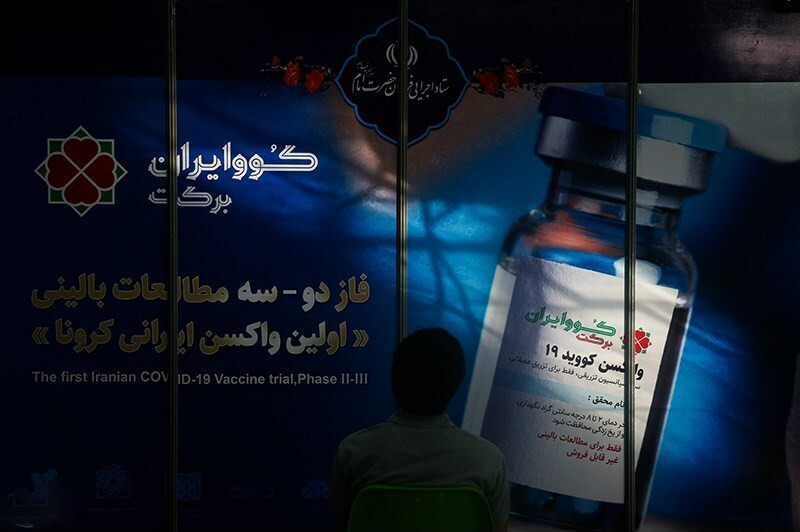
COVIran Barekat -- Phases II and III of the clinical trials

Phases II and III of the clinical trials were combined, allowing to start the third phase before the second completed. Participants were aged between 18 and 75 years.

Phase 2's primary outcome was immunogenicity assessment. It was conducted on 280 volunteers. The first volunteers were inoculated on March 15 and the last injections of the second doses occurred on May 25.

Phase 3's primary outcome was efficacy assessment on preventing mild, moderate and severe disease. It was conducted on 20,000 participants across 6 cities in Iran (Tehran, Karaj, Shiraz, Isfahan, Mashhad and Bushehr). Phase III testing began on June 16, 2021.

==== Results ====
On 16 June 2021, a summary of the results obtained in the phase 1 and phase 2 of the clinical trials have been published in the press. A peer-reviewed article was submitted for publication in August 2021. According to the reports, only mild adverse effects were registered except one case of hypotension, one case of level-2 headache and one case of diminution of platelets that did not need medical care. Conventional Virus Neutralizing Test (cVNT) is reported to have shown 93.5% immunogenicity (95% confidence interval: 88.4 – 99.6%). On 23 June 2021, the production project manager of the vaccine stated that the results of the second phase have shown "the serum of the people who received the vaccine has 93.5% power to neutralize the virus; thus meaning the vaccine has a very good efficacy that will be shown after the end of the third phase".

There are claims of some issues with the vaccine's scientific documentation article according to the U.S. Agency for Global Media-owned broadcasting network Radio Farda.

On 27 July 2021, the Director of the Barkat Pharmaceutical Group stated that a paper with the result of the clinical trials have been prepared and submitted. "It will be sent to 10 important scientific journals of the world but it may take time before they publish it".

In February 2021 (while phase 1 study was ongoing), the head of the vaccine production team at the Setad stated that the vaccine also neutralizes the British mutated COVID-19 virus.

On 3 March 2022, clinical results have been published in Clinical Microbiology and Infection, a peer-reviewed medical journal.

On 9 April 2022, peer-reviewed results of the phases I and II of the clinical trials have been published in BMJ Open.

On 21 September 2023, peer-reviewed results of the phases III of the clinical trials have been published in BMJ Open. Conclusion was that the two dose regimen conferred efficacy of 50.2% against symptomatic covid-19, 70.5% against severe disease, and 83.1% against critical disease. The vaccine did not raise safety concerns and was well tolerated.

==== Trial on children aged 12-18 ====
A phase I-II clinical trial on children aged 12–18 years began on 23 November 2021. It consist of a comparison study where half of the 500 participants receive a Coviran Barkat vaccine and the other half a Sinopharm BIBP vaccine. Primary outcome is safety and immunogenicity assessment.

==== Other countries ====
As official in charge of manufacturing Iran Barekat vaccines, Mohammad Reza Salehi said, "some neighboring countries tend to enter the third phase of the clinical trial of the Iranian COVIran Barekat". They are reviewing recommendations to let them participate. On 17 March 2022 Iran signed an agreement with Nicaragua to export this vaccine. on 22 June 2022 Nicaragua received 200,000 doses of vaccines.

=== Authorizations ===
The vaccine received its authorization license from the Iran Food and Drug Administration on June 13, 2021.

CovIran Barkat is in the process to be registered by the World Health Organization. Presubmission meeting held on 26 January 2022.

== Society and culture ==
Ali Khamenei, the Supreme Leader of Iran, received his first dose of Iran's locally made COVIran Barekat vaccine on 25 June 2021 (twelve days after it received its public use authorization from Iranian authorities). He received his second dose on 23 July 2021.

Ebrahim Raisi, Mohammad Bagher Ghalibaf, Ali Larijani, and Amoli Larijani, have been vaccinated with COVIran Barekat.

=== Controversy ===
Under pressure the vaccine was approved before it started phase III trials.

== CovIran Barkat Plus ==
CovIran Barkat Plus (also named BIV1-CovIran Plus) is a COVID-19 vaccine candidate based on the Omicron variant. It is currently in development and studied as a third dose.

Clinical trials on humans began in March 2022 after the Ministry of Health and Medical Education (of Iran) gave its approval following the studies on animals. Clinical trials are conducted on 210 volunteers with a history of two-dose vaccination of either the standard CovIran Barkat or the Sinopharm BIBP vaccine. CovIran Barkat Plus will be given as a third dose.

== See also ==
- Pharmaceuticals in Iran
- COVID-19 pandemic in Iran
- COVID-19 vaccine clinical research
