= Knowledge enterprise =

Type of business entity

Knowledge enterprise is a knowledge company. Variations of this name include knowledge-intensive company, organisation, or enterprise. However, the scope and origin of this terminology is unclear, according to D. Jemielniak. This term can be more readily defined by how much a company depends on knowledge, and how much that dependence plays a part in the company. There is no consensus on how dependent a company must be for it to be considered a knowledge company. However, there are some variations in knowledge companies, such as in the economy, in which there are two groups, one labor-intensive, and the other knowledge-intensive.

Knowledge enterprises are defined as enterprises where knowledge and knowledge-based products are offered to the market. The products and services can vary from plans to prototypes or mass-produced products where research and development costs are a large part. Employees of knowledge enterprises usually have an academic education, and while this is not required, education is helps in the legitimization of expert status and high fees. The work in knowledge enterprises is based on employees' intellectual skills and the tasks are not routine. The skill of combining different knowledge is required.

== Emergence of knowledge enterprises ==
According to Jemielniak, knowledge enterprises have emerged due to changes in the global economy. Over time, the economy has put more priority on services. The emergence of knowledge companies is also called a symptom of the third industrial revolution, in which the workers are separated from the owners of the production.

== Case study: IBM ==
The idea of a knowledge company and its effects is shown in IBM seen in the change in structure and income. In 1924, IBM's 96% of profits were generated by leasing the manufacturing equipment, while punched cards were responsible for 4% of the profit. In the 1970s, 80% of the profit came from equipment divisions, 15% from the software division, and 5% from services. In the 1990s services contributed to 30% of IBM's profits. In 2007, services made up 37% of income, close to the amount of income generated by IBM rendering, which was 40%. This example only reflects the overall change, which is manifested by the reversed proportion between tangible and intangible assets of companies. This evolution has forced a shift in the access to these resources from manual to non-manual (knowledge) workers. The structure in companies was also changed, as decision making power was handed down from owners and top managers to middle managers and specialists. These developments accompany the emergence and growing importance of knowledge enterprises.

== Classification of knowledge enterprises ==
Knowledge enterprises, according to Lowendahl, can be divided into:

- Client-based companies, in which terms of strategic concentration are client-oriented, and resources are controlled individually. Some examples include law offices and accounting bureaus.
- Problem-solving-oriented companies, in which strategic concentration is focused on creative problem solving and innovation, and resources are allocated on a team basis. Examples include advertising companies and software development companies.
- Output-based companies, in which strategic concentration is based on adaptability and application of already existing solutions, and resources are allocated by the organization. An example could be management consultancy companies.

In another approach knowledge companies are divided into professional service companies, and research and development companies.

Companies with multiple different units may only have some of those units as knowledge-intensive units. They work for the whole enterprise and their services are usually not offered outside the company. For example, research and development, designing, engineering, accounting, and law units can be seen as knowledge-intensive units.

== Tools of knowledge enterprises ==
Knowledge enterprises, due to their high-tech profile, almost exclusively base themselves on IT technologies. This includes using hardware and software to conduct managerial processes, and organize working environments for all employees, from executive to top management. This is why software development is crucial for the existence and evolution of such knowledge companies. Software applications are also developed for many areas within such organizations, since without them it is difficult to control and coordinate work that is dedicated to innovation, and problem-solving.

== Knowledge enterprises and brain drain ==
The main reason for the ‘brain drain’ phenomenon and the involvement of knowledge companies, is a great gap between the education that IT professionals can get and the low wages that they receive. The problem is that educational infrastructure in the transition countries in Central and Eastern Europe does not have to catch up with their counterparts in knowledge-based economies, like the United States, but that salaries of the knowledge workers in both groups of countries differ very much. Knowledge-intensive companies from knowledge-based economies may propose much better incentives to have them move and work for them. This is the reason why human resources from transition countries are drained to those countries, that are characterized by the salary competitive advantage.
