= Ali Tayebnia =

Iranian politician (born 1960)

- علی طیب‌نیا
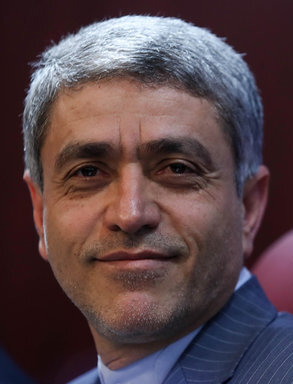
- Tayebnia in 2024

Supreme Advisor to the President of Iran
- Incumbent
- Assumed office 4 August 2024
- President: Masoud Pezeshkian
- Preceded by: Parviz Davoodi (2013)

Minister of Economic Affairs and Finance
- In office 15 August 2013 – 20 August 2017
- President: Hassan Rouhani
- Preceded by: Shamseddin Hosseini
- Succeeded by: Masoud Karbasian

Personal details
- Born: 5 April 1960 (age 66) Isfahan, Iran
- Party: Independent
- Education: University of Tehran
- Awards: Lee Kuan Yew Prize (2017)
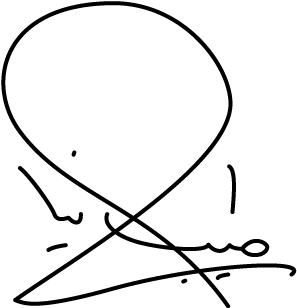
- Signature
- Website: Personal website

Ali Tayebnia (Persian: علی طیب‌نیا; born 5 April 1960) is an Iranian academic, economist and President Pezeshkian's supreme advisor since 2024. He was designated by President Hassan Rouhani for the position of finance minister on 4 August 2013 and was confirmed by the parliament on 15 August. He left the office on 20 August 2017.

== Early life and education ==
Tayebnia was born in Isfahan in 1960. He received his BA (1986) and MA (1989) in theoretical economics, and his PhD (1994) in economics, all from the University of Tehran and first in each class. As part of Tayebnia's doctoral studies, he spent a year studying at the London School of Economics under the supervision of Laurence Harris.

== Career ==
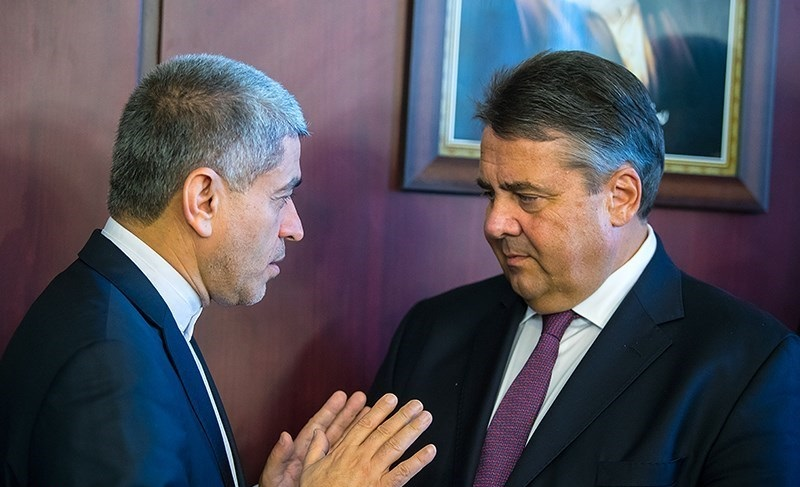
Tayebnia and German Vice Chancellor and Economic Minister Sigmar Gabriel in Tehran, 3 October 2016

Tayebnia is an academic and has served in various state education institutions delivering courses on economy and finance. He was a faculty member at his alma mater, the University of Tehran. His field of interest is public economics.

He was the secretary of the economic commission from 1997 to 2000. He served as the deputy head of the Presidential Office for planning under the President Mohammad Khatami from 2001 to 2005. Then he was again named the secretary of the economic commission in 2005, and his tenure lasted until 2007.

He was a representative of and an advisor to Mohammad Reza Aref during the 2013 presidential elections. He was also Aref's economic advisor.

On 15 August, the Majlis approved him as minister, giving 274 votes for and 7 votes against. He was given the highest votes for with the rate of 96.5% which was also all-time record for Iranian confirmation process.

=== Views ===
Financial Times described Tayebnia as a reform-minded academic in August 2013.

=== Recognition ===
Tayebnia is the recipient of the Lee Kuan Yew Prize which was awarded to him in 2017.

== Executive Activities ==
In the administrations of Akbar Hashemi Rafsanjani and Mohammad Khatami, Ali Tayebnia consistently served as the Secretary and Advisor to the Economic Commission of the government. In 1997, Tayebnia simultaneously held the position of Deputy for Planning and Economic Affairs, serving as the Deputy to the then-President, overseeing all economic responsibilities of the Executive Vice President.

After the elimination of the role of Deputy to the President for Executive Affairs in Mohammad Khatami's second term, Tayebnia continued his work in the Presidential Office as the Deputy for Economic and Technical Coordination under the First Vice President. During this period, he also took on the responsibility of the National Crisis Management Headquarters.

In 2005, Tayebnia was appointed Deputy for Economic Affairs at the Management and Planning Organization (later renamed the Plan and Budget Organization). He oversaw the drafting of the national budgets for the years 2006 and 2007.

Moreover, during 2005 and 2006, Tayebnia served as the President’s representative on the Money and Credit Council, while simultaneously holding the position of Deputy for Economic Affairs at the Management and Planning Organization and being a member of the country’s Economic Council.

In 2013, during Hassan Rouhani’s administration, Tayebnia secured the position of Minister of Economic Affairs and Finance with a decisive 274 votes out of 284 in the Islamic Consultative Assembly.

On November 14, 2018, he was appointed as a member of the Money and Credit Council, the supervisory body for financial services and banking in Iran.

== See also ==
- Hossein Samsami

Political offices
Preceded by Shamseddin Hosseini	Minister of Economic Affairs and Finance; 2013–2017	Succeeded by Masoud Karbasian
