= Hossein Samsami =

Iranian politician and academic (born 1967)

- حسین صمصامی

Representative of Islamic Consultative Assembly 12th term
- Incumbent
- Assumed office May 27, 2024
- Constituency: Tehran, Rey, Shemiranat, Eslamshahr and Pardis
- Majority: 236,921 votes

Deputy Chairman of the Imam Khomeini Relief Foundation
- In office November 10, 2019 – June 13, 2021
- Appointed by: Morteza Bakhtiari
- Preceded by: Amir Mansour Borqaee
- Succeeded by: Mostafa Khaksar Ghahroudi

Minister of Economic Affairs and Finance
- In office April 2, 2008 – August 5, 2008; Acting
- President: Mahmoud Ahmadinejad
- Preceded by: Davoud Danesh-Jafari
- Succeeded by: Shamseddin Hosseini

Personal details
- Born: 1967 (age 58–59) Najaf, Iraqi Republic
- Education: Shahid Beheshti University
- Occupation: Economist
- Profession: Currency market
- Cabinet: Ninth government

Hossein Samsami Mazra'eh Akhound (born 1967 in Najaf) is an Iranian politician and institutionalist economist. He is also an assistant professor in the Department of Economics at Shahid Beheshti University and a representative of the 12th term of the Islamic Consultative Assembly from Tehran, Rey, Shemiranat, Eslamshahr and Pardis constituencies. In 2008, he was the interim head of the Ministry of Economic Affairs and Finance for a short period, but he was not nominated to the parliament for the ministry. In 2019, he was appointed to the position of the deputy chairman of the Imam Khomeini Relief Foundation.

Samsami has worked on the issue of exchange rates in Iran and defended his doctoral thesis entitled "A model for calculating the appropriate exchange rate during the structural reform of Iran" with the guidance of professor Mohammad Naser Sherafat Jahromi. Samsami has published several articles in this field. According to Samsami, the free currency market is a corrupt, fake market and a place of enemy influence, and until it is dissolved, the price will increase and there will be no stability in the currency market.

The most important economic idea of Samsami is that the price of the dollar is not real and hence he is also known as Mr. Cheap Dollar. He does not consider the dollar and other foreign currencies to be affected by the inflation rate like other goods in the domestic economy, and he does not accept that high inflation and low productivity in the use of resources lead to a decrease in the value of the rial, but on the contrary, he believes that the unrealistic price of the dollar leads to an increase in the inflation rate. Therefore, even though he was known as a fundamentalist and a critic of the Rouhani government, he seriously supported the method of calculating the price and taking action to implement the policy of allocating 4,200 Toman dollars (known as the Jahangiri currency). In several interviews, Samsami expressed his opposition to the attempt to remove this plan in the government of Ebrahim Raisi, who was forced to do it so after the shortage of foreign exchange resources, and considers this action to be the root cause of the increase in inflation in his government. In another similar approach, Samsami is against the plan of targeting subsidies for a fairer distribution of government subsidies, which was implemented in the fundamentalist government of Ahmadinejad, and says, "Our economy was wounded with purposefulness." Samsami introduced the payment of cash subsidy in this plan as a cause for the worsening of the condition of the poor after its implementation, and he considered the reason for this to be the inflation created by this plan, and rejected the Central Bank's estimate that its implementation only caused 5% inflation without presenting his own estimate of the created inflation. He does not accept the short-term and long-term anti-inflationary effects of this plan, caused by the increase in productivity, which was not included in the Central Bank's estimate. In a research, Samsami had predicted that with the implementation of this plan in 2010, assuming the stability of other conditions in the model of targeting subsidies with cash payment, the Gini coefficient would first decrease from 39% to 35% and then increase again to 42% in 2011. So, the net effect of this plan is to increase the Gini coefficient and inequality becomes more in Iran economic system. But in practice, despite the occurrence of sanctions against Iran in 2011, the Gini coefficient index continued its downward trend until 2014, and then the slope of its graph increased.

== Supervisor in the Ministry of Economy ==
After the resignation of Davoud Danesh-Jafari from the head of the Ministry of Economy in May 2008, the president appointed Samsami as the acting minister of economy at the request of Parviz Davoodi. His tenure in the Ministry of Economy exceeded the statutory 3 months due to the entry of the 8th Parliament into the summer vacation, and the government obtained permission from the Leader of the Revolution to continue to carry out his responsibilities in this position.

During Samsami's three-month tenure in this ministry, he had a challenge with the president, one of the reasons for which was the unsuccessful experience of Samsami's attendance at the meeting of the economic committee of the parliament, which caused the dissatisfaction of the members due to his lack of planning and his failure to answer the questions of this commission. The controversial issues that arose during this period between Samsami and the rest of the economic team and the president include Samsami's proposed plan to merge the country's commercial banks to solve the problems of the banking system, the dismissal of Hamid Pourmohammadi from the Ministry of Economy due to a disagreement with Samsami on the merger of banks, which by order of the president Pourmohammadi returned to the Ministry of Economy, collecting banking information in the Ministry of Economy instead of the Central Bank, Samsami's reporting false bank information that led to the threat of Ahmadinejad to resigning and the issue of how to determine the bank interest rate in the country, which Samsami believed that there is no relationship between bank interest rates and inflation. Samsami said that the president himself can determine and reduce the bank interest rate.

After Mahmoud Ahmadinejad did not introduce Samsami to the parliament, he also refused to participate in the inauguration ceremony.

Samsami made it to the second stage in the Iranian legislative election in Tehran in March 2024.

== Performance and views ==
Samsami considers the exchange rate to be the main cause of inflation and believes that there is no relationship between bank profit and inflation. During his tenure as the head of the Ministry of Economy, he stated that the currency price in the market was around 900 Tomans, according to the researches he conducted, the real exchange rate is 450 Tomans, and he believed that the government and the central bank should reduce the rate by applying trade restrictions. He called the act of sprinkling the government's currency with oil revenues in the market, deindustrialization and the Dutch disease as supporting a cheap exchange rate. In 2013, he was against the single rate of currency and ending the allocation of government currency at the rate of 1,226 Tomans. At the end of the 2010s, Samsami was one of the approvers of the method of calculating and determining the dollar rate as 4,200 Tomans. And in 2023, when the dollar currency price in the open market was close to 60 thousand tomans, Samsami believed that according to his calculations, the dollar currency price should be below 20 thousand tomans.

=== Foreign exchange and commercial policy ===
Since the 2000s, Samsami has wanted to lower the exchange rate, impose a series of trade restrictions on exports and imports, eliminate the free dollar currency market, set the exchange rate by the government, and lower the exchange rate with the government's foreign currency injection by using the oil revenues. He considers the main cause of inflation to be "exchange rate". According to Samsami, the real dollar rate is lower than the current rates.

==== Determining the exchange rate during the administration of the Ministry of Economy ====
In the first days when Samsami was appointed as the acting minister of economic affairs and finance, he raised the issue of the unrealistically high price of the currency (dollar) and said: "In the survey that I have done, the value of the dollar is 450 Tomans." This was due to the fact that since 2002, i.e., for 6 years, the price of currency and dollar had been kept constant at around 900-800 Tomans, and this was despite the occurrence of double-digit inflation every year in the country.

In response to the question of whether you have used the method of purchasing power of money to calculate the value of the dollar, Samsami stated: "This method is outdated and I have estimated using new models that the value of the dollar against the rial is much lower than these values. A major part of the country's exports is not related to the value of the dollar, and that part of non-oil exports that is dependent on the value of the dollar can be compensated with export awards."

Samsami's desire to suppress and lower the currency price by applying trade bans and sprinkling currency in the market with oil export earnings (which is called the Dutch disease or deindustrialization in the economic literature) became one of the reasons for his strong disagreement with Tahmasb Mazaheri, the head of the Central Bank at the time. During this period, in response to Samsami's promise to halve the price of currency and dollar to 450 tomans, Mazaheri says, "Some believe that the dollar should become cheaper and reach 300 to 700 tomans. Another group says that the dollar should rise as much as it can, but if we assume that the price of the dollar is lower than the reasonable price in the market, foreign exchange reserves will be withdrawn from the country, and this is detrimental to the national economy, this is because we should not hurt ourselves in the economy." Mazaheri goes on to say that the country does not have free currency to drastically lower the price in the market (with currency sprinkling).

==== 6-point plan to reduce the exchange rate ====
In 2023, in addition to stating that the currency price according to his calculations should be below 20 thousand tomans, for this price reduction, Samsami introduced a 6-point plan to reduce the exchange rate, which based on the foreign exchange policy that set a rate of 4,200 to stabilize the dollar currency rate such as 2018. According to Samsami, this policy was not implemented scientifically and correctly in 2018. These six points are as follows:

1- Calculating the price of the government dollar: this should be done as in 2018, but based on a scientific logic.

2- Free currency market closure: Samsami says, "In order to closure the free currency market, there must be a consensus that all governing bodies, from the police force to the judiciary and surveillance and intelligence agencies, should come to work, and a common strategy should be formed in this regard, and the result would be a constant rate for the currency (the rate that is set in the first stage in the form of an order by price suppression and lower than its agreed and market price) in the country." In Iran, in the 1980s, 1990s, 2011 and 2018, an attempt was made to stabilize the government currency rate in this way, but it was not successful, and even by preventing the creation of a free currency market and announcing the rate within the borders of the country, the exchange market of Rial and other currencies continues abroad the country (especially in Dubai and Istanbul).

Samsami says about the characteristics of this single rate of currency price: "Single rate is not based on the free market price, but based on the price that is suitable for production and leads to inflation control. However, when this rate is determined, we are no longer going to give currency to some people who go to Antalya to have fun, or give it to the importer to import, for example, a coffee maker. This currency should be allocated to the import of raw materials and capital goods."

3- Applying restrictions on foreign trade: The government should use its authority in the government exchange rate stabilization system and prevent the import of the specified non-essential goods by not allocating currency to them.

4- Implementation of full foreign exchange contract: Exporters are obliged to complete implementation of the contract of foreign exchange. In the conditions of the sanctions, where there is no supervision of foreign currency for imported materials by circumventing the sanction, in addition to the fact that the foreign exchange contract will reduce exports and capital flight in the form of currency flight of exported products from the country happened, the full implementation of this conditions during sanctions is completely unenforceable and impossible due to the lack of effective government supervision over the currency payment process, and it is impossible to prevent the false declaration of the value and amount of imports and exports.

5- Organizing and dealing with the exchange offices: According to Samsami, "besides foreign exchange contracting, we should also organize the activities of the exchange offices, because without a doubt, one of the factors that cause chaos and disruption in the country's currency system is the destructive actions of the exchange offices in the country."

6- Media attachment: No further explanation has been given in this case.

=== Changing the price of chicken by removing foreign exchange rent ===
Samsami, before removing the allocation of 4,200 Tomans dollar currency in June 2022, in an interview with Tasnim News Agency and also in a debate on the Islamic Republic of Iran Broadcasting television program named Jahan Ara with the topic "4,200 Tomans Currency: Yes or No?", stated that the allocation of this exchange rate, contrary to the opinion of some experts, has hit the target for many goods and if it is removed, for example, the price of chicken meat, which is currently (March 25, 2022) with a currency of 4,200 tomans, is 24 or 25 thousand Tomans per kilo, after removing the allocation, it should be 70 to 80 thousand Tomans per kilo, and for example, we pay 40 thousand Tomans for eggs, which goes up to 100 thousand Tomans. The price of whole bagged chicken in the market on this date in March 2022 was 35-31 thousand tomans per kilo and not 24 thousand tomans. Next, before the government and the central bank, Samsami took action to remove the allocation of this currency, by publishing a table in the media, Samsami expressed his prediction of the results of removing the currency of 4,200 tomans, in which it was mentioned that after removing the currency of 4,200 tomans, the cost price of chicken production will be 85 thousand tomans per kilo and naturally for the consumer it is much more than this amount.

After removing the allocation of 4,200 Tomans in June 2022, the price of bagged hot chicken increased by a price jump and reached 55,900 Tomans in August and then until January and February, this price jump decreased to 51,500 tomans, which meant a jump of 20 thousand tomans in the price of each kilo of hot chicken.

Also, before removing the 4,200 Toman currency, Samsami claimed that the allocation of 4,200 Tomans for many goods such as chicken and eggs was alternatively on target, and for some goods such as edible oil, the amount of the allocation was completely on target. This was while when the allocation of 4,200 Tomans currency began in April 2018, the price of a kilo of chicken was 6,000 Tomans, and the cost of chicken feed and medicine was officially provided with the allocation of 4,200 Tomans currency, and this allocation continued until June 2022, but in April, the price of chicken had increased by 500% to 35 thousand tomans. If the allocation of 4,200 Tomans currency had hit the target in reducing the price of chicken and eggs, despite the fact that the currency allocation rate was fixed at 75% of chicken production costs, its price in people's shopping basket would not have increased by 500%. The result of this wrong estimate of the amount of hitting the target of 4,200 Tomans currency allocation was the allocation of more than 70 billion dollars of currency from the country's reserves at the rate of 4,200 Tomans according to official statistics and more than 110 billion dollars according to unofficial statistics.

In 2018, Samsami himself was one of the critics of the inadequacy of the distribution network of imported meat with a price of 4,200 Tomans, which according to him does not reach the people and does not achieve its goals of providing cheap meat to the people, but in 2022 he believed that the allocation of 4,200 currency in some goods such as meat, chicken and eggs hit the target.

=== Opposition to structural reforms in the economy ===
As an institutionalist economist, in some key issues of Iran's economy, Samsami opposes measures for structural economic reforms and emphasizes solutions based on eliminating competitive markets with pricing, government management, creating multiple prices, and endogenous solutions based solely on internal resources. This point of view is against the structural reform in various fields such as reforming the banking and tax system, reforming the structure of energy subsidy distribution, encouraging competition and reducing government interference, etc. In this case, the following can be examples:

==== The plan of targeting subsidies for energy carriers and payment of cash subsidies ====
He was against the amendment of the implementation of the subsidy targeting plan with direct cash payment of the energy carriers' subsidy. In 2014, in an interview, referring to the start of the gasoline rationing plan and the distribution of fuel cards in Iran for this purpose in 2007, he stated that in response to criticisms about the non-targeting of subsidy payments in this way and without price correction, the results of fuel subsidy payments is for the rich. Mohammad Reza Nematzadeh, the then Minister of Industry, conducted a research that showed that among the gasoline consumers, about 60-70% of them are from cheap cars, including Paykan, Pride, and utility vans, and 15% are related to medium cars such as Samand, Peugeot and only 8% of gasoline consumption dedicated to luxury cars. Samsami concludes from this information that the statements about the untargeted use of fuel with only fuel cards in the country are unprofessional and emotional words of some people, and the distribution of fuel in this way without price correction is targeted and with favorable results.

==== Multi-rate and currency mismatch ====
In the field of foreign exchange policy, Samsami also believes that instead of reforming the management structure of the foreign exchange market, the rate and allocation of currency should be continued in the government manner and the domestic free foreign exchange market should be closed with security and police measures.

==== Deepening the insufficiency of the banking system with their nationalization plan ====
When Samsami was the chief of Ministry of Economic Affairs and Finance, regarding the monetary and banking policy, he stated that there is no connection between the bank interest rate and inflation in theory and practice. In this period, instead of reforming the banking system for the optimal allocation of facilities and reducing inflation to reduce the interest rate of banking facilities, he wanted to implement a plan to merge commercial banks and form a benevolent lending bank. With this plan, Samsami wanted the competition mechanism of banks to be closed for the optimal allocation of financial resources, and the government and the central bank could allocate banking facilities under their own control.

== Personal life ==
Hossein Samsami Mazra'eh Akhound is originally from the village of Samsam Abad of Mazra'eh Akhound county from Nasr Abad city of Taft, and was born in Najaf, Iraq, but he completed his primary and high school education in Qom, Iran and successfully obtained a diploma in this city. During the tenure of the Ministry of Economy, it was mentioned in the media that Samsami is the niece of Parviz Davoodi, the first deputy of the first government of Mahmoud Ahmadinejad, but Davoodi denied this rumor at the ceremony of introducing him to the Ministry of Economy.

== Educational records ==
- PhD in Economic Sciences from Shahid Beheshti University of Tehran
- Master of Economics from Shahid Beheshti University of Tehran
- Bachelor of Economics, Shahid Beheshti University, Tehran (entered 1985)

== Career records ==
- Acting head of the Ministry of Economic Affairs and Finance of Iran (2008)
- Secretary of the Government Economic Commission (2005-2008)
- Head of the Center for the Prevention of Economic Crimes of the Judiciary
- Head of Islamic Economy Research Center

== Compilations ==
- Money Economy and Banking (in Persian: اقتصاد پول و بانکداری)
- Towards the Elimination of Usury from the Banking System (in Persian: به سوی حذف ربا از نظام بانکی)
- Etymology of Islamic Economics (4 volumes) (in Persian: مأخذشناسی اقتصاد اسلامی (۴ جلد))
- The Black Box of Rial Weakening (in Persian: جعبه سیاه تضعیف ریال)
- International Economics Theory and Policy (Volume 1: International Trade) (Translation, in Persian: اقتصاد بین‌الملل تئوری و سیاست (جلد اول: تجارت بین‌الملل))

== See also ==
- Ahmad Meydari
- Abbas Mirakhor
- Mohammad Nahavandian
- Mohammad Bagher Nobakht
- Mohammad Tabibian
- Ali Tayebnia
