= Taxation in Iran =

Taxation in Iran is levied and collected by the Iranian National Tax Administration under the Ministry of Finance and Economic Affairs of the Government of Iran. In 2008, about 55% of the government's budget came from oil and natural gas revenues, the rest from taxes and fees. An estimated 50% of Iran's GDP was exempt from taxes in FY 2004. There are virtually millions of people who do not pay taxes in Iran and hence operate outside the formal economy. The fiscal year begins on March 21 and ends on March 20 of the next year.

As part of the Iranian Economic Reform Plan, the government proposed income tax increases on traders in gold, steel, fabrics and other sectors, prompting work stoppages by merchants.

== Government's budget ==
The government can increase its tax revenues 2.5 times by enacting tax reforms. As at 2012, taxes account for 43% of the government's revenues and 7% of Iran's GDP. The Expediency Council's report recommended increasing that share to 15% of the GDP. As of 2014, the share of direct taxes from the total tax revenues was around 70%. Top ten percent earners in Iranian society pay 3% of all income taxes, while in the United States the top 10% pay more than 70% of the total income taxes. Contradicting this, the head of the Majlis Economic Commission says that 85% of Iran's tax revenues “come from barely 3% of taxpayers”.

=== Tax evasion ===
According to the Expediency Council, more than 60% of economic activity in Iran avoids or evades taxation: 40% of the economic activity falls under an exemption and the remaining 21% are conducted off-the-books (2012). Iran is losing between $12–20 billion a year through tax avoidance and evasion. However the Iranian National Tax Administration only identified and collected through audit unpaid taxes worth 184 trillion rials ($1.5 billion) in FY 2018. Starting in 2015, Iran's parliament decided to tax Setad and the Islamic Revolutionary Guard Corps.

Tax evaders typically are either involved in activities in the gray sector of economy or in the underground market which they do not divulge. Others are engaged in smuggling and the black market. The loses are equivalent to 20% to 25% of the country's gross domestic product revenue. In 2014, international medias reported Iranian nationals and companies to be listed among the tax evaders in Switzerland and other offshore centers.

In 2019, Iranian tax revenues increased by 35% because of reported taxation evasion crackdown. As of 2021, tax authorities estimated tax cheats are costing the country $4.5 billion a year.

== Income tax ==
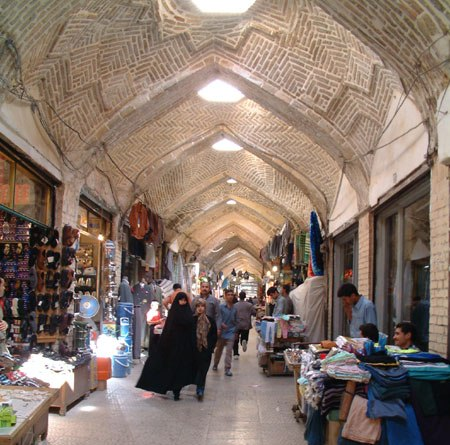

There are five categories of income earned by individuals. Each category is taxed separately and has its own computational rules.

- Salaries (tax rate for public sector employees: 10%; other sectors: 10-35%);
- Income from professions, trades, and miscellaneous sources; (More info here)

According to the Iranian direct tax rolls article no 84. all employees salary tax rate from the beginning of the 1396 fiscal year is as below:

Every year annual salary exemption from tax will be announce by Iranian tax organization up to this level the salary tax rate is zero.

Up to the 5 times more than annual exemption salary tax rate is 10%.

In excess of above level salary tax rate is 20%.

- Incidental or windfall earnings; (More info here)
- Real estate income (see also under "Real estate tax" section below)
- Income derived from agriculture (see also under "Tax exemptions" section below)

For taxable income consisting of salary and benefits, employers are required to make the necessary tax deductions from their employees’ payroll and submit them to the tax authorities. However, when calculating taxable income, exemptions and deductions are allowed. As of 2009, only government employees were paying their fair share of income taxes.

Individuals of Iranian nationality resident in Iran are subject to tax on all their income whether earned in Iran or abroad. Foreign nationals working in Iran are also subject to the same income tax based on their salary. Non-resident individuals are liable to pay tax only on their Iranian-sourced income. Foreign employees cannot obtain an exit visa from Iran unless they provide proof that they have paid their due taxes, and since they need to obtain an exit permit when their presence in Iran is based on a work permit, the government can easily enforce this rule. The government assumes a certain salary for employees depending on their position and country of origin. The assumed minimum monthly salaries in 2004 range from US$2,500 for unskilled European workers to US$7,000 for European managing directors.

According to the 131 note of Iranian tax rolls, from the beginning of the 1395 Iranian year tax rates of the individual business income have changed:

up to 500.000.000 IRR is 15%

500.000.000 to 1.000.000.000 IRR is 20%

In excess of 1.000.000.000 IRR is 25%

Monthly Individual Business Income - Tax Rates
Income in IRR	Income Tax Rate
Up to 40,000,000 (US$160)	exemption
40,000,000 to 80,000,000 (US$320)	10%
80,000,000 to 120,000,000 (US$480)	15%
120,000,000 to 180,000,000 (US$720)	20%
180,000,000 to 240,000,000 (US$900)	25%
240,000,000 to 320,000,000 (US$1200)	30%
In excess of 320,000,000 (US$1200)	35%

=== Islamic taxes ===
In addition to these mandatory taxes, as of 2007, Islamic taxes were collected on a voluntary basis. These included an individual's income tax (Arabic khums, “one-fifth”); an alms-tax (zakat), which has a variable rate and benefits charitable causes; and a land tax (kharaj), the rate of which is based on the principle of one-tenth (ushr) of the value of crops, unless the land is tax-exempt.

Al Khums or the Fifth of excess income paid as a form of Zakat (alms-giving), which is usually reserved for Aal-Al-Bayt, Muhammad’s Household. The black turban of Ali Khamenei signifies that he belongs to Imam Ali Ibn Abi Talib and Fatima’s household and being Al Wali Al Faqeeh (guardian of Islamic jurists with full control of the society's affairs) gives him the majority share of the Fifth, as was the case with Ayatollah Khomeini. The amount is worth hundreds of millions of dollars accrued annually and added to Setad’s revenues.

== Real estate tax ==
Rental income is subject to real estate income tax in Iran. A fixed deduction of 25% of the gross income is extended to all taxpayers to account for income-generating expenses. The net income, which is 75% of the gross rent, is then subject to the same rates as in the above table (max. 35%). Rental income is exempted from real estate tax if the property is a residential property leased as such and measures up to 150 sq. m. if it is located in Tehran (up to 200 sq. m. if it is located in other parts of the country).

According to the presented above rate for individual business tax rate: -If the landlord is a company the rental income after deducting 25% as exemption will be-multiply 25% because the income tax rate for companies is 25% -If the landlord is a person rate of calculating tax on rent is as below from the beginning of the 1395 fiscal year:

up to 500.000.000 IRR is 15%

500.000.000 to 1.000.000.000 IRR is 20%

In excess of 1.000.000.000 IRR is 25%

In Iran the transfer of land, not the land itself, is subject to taxation. Transfer of properties: 5% of the transaction value (15% for new buildings).

=== Capital gains tax ===
As of 2020, Iran has no capital gains tax on the sale of real estate assets.

== Capital markets ==
- Cash dividend: none (22.5% at source from Company).
- Share transfers: the Tax Amendment has changed the regulations regarding calculation of tax on transfer of shares and their rights in Iranian corporate entities.
  - In the case of shares listed on the Tehran Stock Exchange (TSE) the tax on transfer of such shares and other rights is 0.5 per cent of the sales price.
  - In the case of transfer of the shares and their rights to other corporate entities (i.e. those not listed on the TSE) a flat rate of four per cent of value of the shares and rights transferred applies. No other taxes will be charged. The Amendment has removed the requirement to value the shares in this category.

=== Exemptions ===
- Capital gain: no tax (bonds or equities).
- Interest income: no tax.
- Participation papers: Profit and awards accrued are tax exempt.
- Listed companies: 10% tax exemption, companies holding 20% free loat shares are provided 20% tax exemption.
- Foreign investors: Foreign investors in TSE are tax-exempt.

== Inheritance tax ==
Inheritance taxes are levied at progressive rates depending on the relationship between the deceased and the heir.

- Category I: (first degree heirs) parents, spouse, children, grandchildren
- Category II: (second degree heirs) grandparents, siblings, nieces, nephews
- Category III: (third degree heirs) uncles, aunts, children of uncles and aunts

According to Article (17) has approved 2015, any estate or property left from an individual, because of his death, whether actual or presumptive, shall be subject to taxation as follows: (1) In respect of bank deposits, partnership bonds and any other negotiable papers, excluding those mentioned under Paragraph (2) of this Article, and their allocated interests, as well as dividends and partners’ shares till the date of registration of transfer to the name of the heirs and or the date when the same is paid and delivered to them, at the rate of 3%; (2) In respect of shares and partners’ shares and their priority rights, at a rate which is 1.5 times higher than the rates stipulated in Note (1) under Articles (143) and (143 bis) of the present Act, as per relevant provisions at the date of registration of transfer to the name of the heirs; (3) In respect of royalties and other properties, as well as financial rights not stipulated in the aforementioned paragraphs, at the rate of 10% of their market value at the date of delivery or registration of transfer to the name of the heirs; 1 In view of Article (2) of the Act Partially Amending the Direct Taxes Act, approved on February 16, 2002, the provisions related to the collection of the Annual Tax on Real estates (subject to the previous text of Articles (3-9), Tax on Unoccupied Residential Immovable Properties (subject to the previous text of Articles (10-11) and Tax on Undeveloped Lands (subject to the previous text of Articles (12-16) were deleted. 2 In view of Paragraph (12) of the Single Article Amending Direct Taxes Act approved on July 22, 2015, provisions concerning the taxation of unoccupied residential units were stipulated through Article (54 bis) annexed to the present Act. 3 Refer to the footnote (1) above. 4 In view of Article (15) of the Act on the Organization and Support of the Production and Supply of Housing, approved on May 14, 2008, a 12 percent tax shall be applied to the transactional value of the undeveloped lands with residential use. 5 Refer to the footnote (1) above.

(4)	In respect of different types of motor vehicles, whether ground, marine or aerial ones, at a rate of 2% of the price declared by the Iranian National Tax Administration at the date of registration of transfer to the name of the heirs;

(5) In respect of real estates and goodwill, at a rate 1.5 times higher than the rates stipulated in Article (59) of this Act, applicable to the transactional value of the real estates for tax purposes, or the market value of the goodwill at the date of registration of transfer to the name of the heirs, as the case may be;

== Corporate income tax ==
A new flat rate corporation tax of 25 per cent payable on the profits of corporate commercial entities has been introduced. This rate replaces the old corporation tax of 10 per cent and progressive rates of income tax (12-54 per cent) on reserves and distributable income. Apart from the 25 per cent corporation tax and the 0.3 per cent Chamber of Commerce tax no more taxes will be payable by the corporate entity or the shareholders.

The new rate of corporation tax will also apply to joint venture corporate entities registered in Iran. The tax incidence will therefore be on the corporate entity and not on the shareholder. The calculation of the tax has been simplified.

All contracting work performed by foreign contractors, whether or not the company is registered in Iran, is taxed. For contracts signed before March 21, 2003, gross taxable income is calculated as gross contract receipts less the cost of imported material. Income is then taxed at 12% of gross taxable income less contract retention. For contracts signed after March 21, 2003, taxable income is the gross contract receipts less contract expenses. Income is taxed at 25 per cent less 5 per cent taxes withheld at source.

=== Taxation of foreign companies ===
Taxation in Iran generates particular unease among foreign firms because they appear to be arbitrarily enforced – tax bills are initially based on 'assumed earnings' calculated by the Finance and Economy Ministry according to the size of the company and the sector in which it operates. Factors such as the quality and location of a company's offices are also widely believed to affect tax assessment.

All foreign investors doing business in Iran or deriving income from sources in Iran are subject to taxation. Depending on the type of activity the foreign investor is engaged in, various taxes and exemptions are applicable, including profit tax, income tax, property tax, etc.

Generally speaking, Iran has two types of laws concerning foreign companies. The first are laws that address issues concerning foreign companies directly such as the Foreign Investment Promotion and Protection Act (FIPPA) and the second are general laws of which certain articles or by-laws address foreign companies, for instance the Taxation Law and the Labor Law. The Tax Act had divided the source of income earned by foreign companies either direct or through their branches in Iran into three main categories:

- Income earned in Iran by way of contracting operations
- Income earned from Iran by way of royalties and licensing fees
- Other activities - trading operations, etc.

[Note: The Amendment has introduced certain changes in the tax treatment of the above activities.]

Foreign legal entities must pay taxes on all taxable income earned through investments in mainland Iran or from direct or indirect (through agents, branch offices, etc.) activities in mainland Iran, at the flat rate of 25% as mentioned in Article 47 of the Amendment law.

Income from royalty and licensing fees received from industrial and mining companies, government ministries and municipalities, and income from film-screening rights are subject to a deemed taxable coefficient on income of 20 per cent. All other income from royalties and licences from foreign companies is subject to a deemed taxable coefficient on income of 30 per cent. The coefficients are based on the standard corporate tax rate of 25 per cent, so that the effective tax rate is either 5 per cent or 7.5 per cent.

[Note: The Amendment has removed the confusion surrounding 'technical assistance contracting' by including 'technical assistance' and 'transfer of technology' in contracting operations subject to tax on the basis of 12 per cent of annual fees.]

=== Tax on liaison, representative and branch Offices ===
The same corporate and profit taxes will be applied to the taxable income of branches of foreign companies (contractors, consultant engineers, et al.)

Other income earning activities of foreign branches will be subject to taxation on an actual basis, i.e. based on their income tax return as filed and supported by their statutory accounting books.

Expenses incurred in Iran by Iranian registered branches and representative offices of foreign companies that are not authorized by their head offices to engage in any trading activity but are only authorized to conduct marketing and market research in Iran are tax deductible upon presentation of receipts from their head office.

=== Tax advantages & exemptions ===
Article 132 The income declared for producing and mining activities, which is derived by non-government legal persons in producing or mining enterprises, for whom exploitation licenses are issued, or with whom extraction and sale contracts are concluded by relevant ministries as of the date of entry into force of the present Act, as well as the income derived from services delivered by hospitals, hotels and touristy residential centers, namely, non-government legal persons, for whom exploitation licenses or permits are issued by relevant legal authorities as of the aforementioned date, shall be subject to a zero tax rate for a period of 5 years beginning from the date of exploitation or extraction or activity start up. As regards the less-developed regions, the provision shall apply to a period of 10 years.1 A) Zero-rate taxation refers to a method whereby the taxpayers in question are obliged to file returns and submit their statutory books or their accounting documents, if any, to the Iranian National Tax Administration in accordance with the arrangements and deadlines required by this Act with regards to their incomes. The Iranian National Tax Administration shall be obliged to investigate such tax returns and assess the taxable income of such taxpayers based on the supporting documents and the tax returns information and shall apply a zero tax rate to the resulting taxable income. B) As for producing or service-oriented enterprises and other centers mentioned in the present Article, if, during the period of exemption, they have more than 50 employees, the term of application of the aforementioned exemption shall increase, providing that they raise the number of employees at least for 50% annually. Consequently, there will

1 In view of Article (31) of the Law for Removing Obstacles to Competitive Production and Promoting the Country's Financial System approved on 21/04/2015, this text and its Paragraphs and Notes substituted the former text of Article (132) of the Act and its Notes.

be an increase of one further year of tax exemption for each annual increase of at least 50% of their employees. The number of employees working in such enterprises, as well as the rate of increase in the number of employees shall be determined upon the confirmation of the Ministry of Cooperatives, Labor and Social Welfare based on documents relevant to the lists of employees’ social security insurance. In case the minimum rate of increase in the number of employees is lowered down in the subsequent year for which the tax incentive prescribed in this Paragraph has been granted, then, the tax amount exempted for that particular year shall be claimed and collected. Cases of retirement, redemption or resign are not regarded as decrease. C) The term of application of the zero rate taxation for enterprises mentioned in the present Article shall increase for 2 further years, if they are located in special economic zones, and for 3 further years, if they are located in industrial towns or special economic zones of less-developed regions. D) The requirement for entitlement to any tax exemptions by real and legal persons engaged in free zones and other regions of the Country is filing tax returns within the due deadline. The legal persons’ tax returns include the balance sheet, as well as profit and loss account in accordance with samples prepared by the Iranian National Tax Administration. E) In order to promote and increase the levels of economic investments in entities subject to the present Article, in addition to the protection period for zero-rate taxation, investments in less-developed regions and other regions shall also be supported in other ways as follows: 1) For less-developed regions: In the computation of taxes relevant to the subsequent years following the zero-rate taxation period pursuant to provisions prescribed in the present Article, as long as the aggregate taxable income is twice the registered and paid-up capital, the zero rate shall still apply but beyond that level, the due taxes shall be computed and collected at the rates prescribed in Article (105) of this Act and the Notes under it. 2) For other regions:

In the computation of taxes relevant to the years following the zero- rate taxation period pursuant to provisions prescribed in the preamble of the present Article, 50% of the taxes shall still be zero rated and the remaining 50% shall be computed and collected at the rates prescribed in Article (105) of this Act and the Notes under it. This provision will persist unless the aggregate taxable income of the enterprise in question equals its registered and paid-up capital, but beyond that level, 100% of the due tax shall be computed at the rates prescribed in Article (105) of the present Act and the Notes under it. The tax incentives mentioned in Sections (1) and (2) of the present Paragraph shall also apply to the income derived from transportation activities by non-government legal persons. If such non-government legal persons have been established prior to the present amendment, they shall be entitled to the tax incentive mentioned in this Article, if they have any reinvestment. Any investments authorized by receiving legal licenses from relevant legal authorities for the establishment, development, reconstruction and renovation of the enterprises in question to create fixed assets, except for lands, shall also be subject to the rule of this Paragraph. F) The exception stipulated for lands at the end of Paragraph (E) is not applicable in cases of investment by non-government legal persons on enterprises of transportation, hospitals, hotels and touristy residential centers, but merely to the extent prescribed in legal licenses issued by relevant authorities. G) In cases of decrease in the registered or paid-up capitals of the abovementioned persons who have already taken benefits from the tax incentive granted by the present Article for increasing their capital, the tax due and the fines thereof shall be claimed and collected. H) If the investments subject to the provisions of the present Article have been made in partnership with foreign investors under the license of the Organization for Investment, Economic and Technical Assistance of Iran, then for any 5% of foreign investment partnership, there will be a

10% increase in the tax incentive prescribed by this Article, which shall not exceed 50% of the registered and paid-in capital. I) Foreign companies that produce well-known brand products in Iran by exploiting capabilities of domestic producing enterprises, shall be subject to the provisions of the present Article as of the date of conclusion of their cooperation contract with the Iranian producing enterprise all throughout the zero-rate taxation period granted to that producing enterprise, provided that they manage to export at least 20% of their products. Moreover, after the expiry of the zero-rate taxation period, such foreign companies shall still be subject to the 50% relief in the tax rate with regard to the profits derived from the sale of their products during the period stipulated in this Article. J) The zero-rate taxation and incentives provisioned in this Article shall not apply to the income of producing and mining entities established within a 120-kilometer radius from the center of Tehran Province or within 50kilometer radius from the center of Isfahan and within a 30-kilometers radius from the administrative centers of provinces and cities with a population exceeding 300,000, according to the latest population and housing census. However, producing enterprises involved in the area of information technology, upon the confirmation of relevant ministries and the VicePresidency for Science and Technology shall be entitled to the privileges provided by this Article. Moreover, producing and mining enterprises established in all special economic zones and industrial townships, except for special economic zones and industrial townships established within the 120-kilometer radius from the center of Tehran Province shall be zero-rated and shall be entitled to the tax incentives provided by this Article. As regards the special economic zones and industrial townships or producing enterprises located within the territory of two or more provinces or cities, the criterion for making decision on the territory to which such zones or townships belong shall be stipulated in a bylaw to be approved by the Council of Ministers, within three months from the approval of the present Act, upon the joint proposal of the Ministry of Industry, Mine and

Trade, the Ministry of Economic Affairs and Finance, the State Organization of Management and Planning and the Department of Environment of the Islamic Republic of Iran. K) The list of less-developed regions, including the names of provinces, townships, counties and rural districts, shall be prepared, within the first three months of the 5-year term of each development plan by the State Organization of Management and Planning in collaboration with the Ministry of Economic Affairs and Finance and will be approved by the Council of Ministers to be applicable until a new list is approved. The date of activity start up, as verified by relevant competent authorities, will be the basis for granting tax incentives for less-developed regions. L) All enterprises for internal and international tourism that have, prior to the entry into force of the present Article, received their exploitation licenses from relevant legal authorities shall be exempt from the payment of 50% of the tax on their declared income up to 6 years after the date of entry into force of this Article. This provision, however, does not apply to incomes derived from sending tourists abroad. M) One hundred percent (100%) of the income declared by tourism and pilgrimage travel agents that have received their licenses from relevant authorities shall be zero rated, provided that such income has been derived from foreign tourists or from sending pilgrims to Saudi Arabia, Iraq or Syria. N) Zero-rate treatment as provisioned by the present Law shall only apply to the income declared by taxpayers and does not apply to hidden incomes. This exclusion shall be applicable in regard with all cases of zerorate taxation provisioned in the present Act or in any other relevant laws. O) Study and research costs of legal persons from the private and cooperative sectors engaged in producing and industrial enterprises, holding exploitation licenses from relevant ministries shall be exempt from the payment of a maximum of 10% of such persons’ declared tax in the year of accrual, provided that such study and research activities have been carried out through contracts concluded with universities or other research and higher education centers holding finalized licenses from the Ministries

of “Science, Research and Technology” or “Health and Medical Education”, within the framework of the State Comprehensive Scientific Map. The latter mentioned contracts shall be eligible for the concerned purpose, only if research councils of the universities or research centers involved have already approved the annual progress reports of the contracts. Moreover, for the entitlement to the exemption, the income declared by such enterprises for producing and industrial activities shall not be less than IRR 5,000,000,000. The study and research costs, which are taken into account as the tax paid by such persons, shall not be accepted as allowable expenses for tax purposes. The administrative bylaw of this Paragraph will be approved by the Ministers of “Economic Affairs and Finance”, “Industry, Mine and Trade”, “Science, Research and Technology” and “Health and Medical Education” upon the proposal of the Iranian National Tax Administration. Note (1) All tax exemptions and zero-rate privileges provisioned by existing laws, other than laws and regulations mentioned in the present Article shall [also] be applicable as of the beginning of the year 1395 (i.e. as of March 20, 2016). Note (2) The administrative bylaw of the present Article and the paragraphs under it, will be prepared, within 6 months of the date of entry into force of this Act, by the Ministries of “Economic Affairs and Finance” and “Industry, Mine and Trade” in collaboration with the Iranian National Tax Administration to be approved by the Council of Ministers.

=== Foreign Investment Promotion and Protection Act (FIPPA) ===
Tax holidays through enactment of FIPPA
Activity	Level of Exemption	Duration of Exemption
Agriculture	100%	No Time Limit
Industry and Mining	100%	5 Years
Industry and Mining in Less-Developed Areas	100%	10 Years
Tourism	50%	No Time Limit
Exports	100%	No Time Limit

Location requirement for tax-exemption:

1. If investment located out of a 120-kilometer radius from the center of Tehran,
2. If investment located out of a 50-kilometer radius from the center of Isfahan,
3. If investment located out of a 30-kilometers radius from the centers of provinces (except for the Industrial Estates within this radius)

=== Tax exemption – major changes ===
The exemptions on exports of manufactured and agricultural goods remain in force, but an ambiguity has occurred in the amendment regarding exemptions extended to the public sector (Iranian Government owned entities). Government owned enterprises and their shares in the private sector entities were excluded from all exemptions granted under the Tax Act.

This exclusion has been removed from the relevant texts in the amendment. Until clarification is provided, it is not certain whether or not the government minority shares in the private sector manufacturing, mining and exports activities would enjoy the exemptions granted.

The 50 per cent tax exemption previously granted to tourism enterprises has been extended to include five-star hotels. Since 2014, foreign companies who set up business in Iran will receive corporate tax breaks of up to 50%, if they export at least 30% of their products.

=== Losses ===
Losses sustained by all taxpayers engaged in trading and other activities, who are required to keep proper books of account, provided they are accepted by the tax authorities; will be carried forward and written off against future profits for a period of three years.

=== Double taxation ===
List of countries that have a double-taxation avoidance agreement with Iran (as of 2014):

Algeria, Austria, Azerbaijan, Bahrain, Belarus, Bulgaria, China, Croatia, France, Georgia, Germany, Indonesia, India,  Jordan, Kazakhstan, Kuwait, Kyrgyzstan, Lebanon, Malaysia, Norway, Oman, Pakistan, Poland, Qatar, Romania, Russia, Serbia, South Africa, South Korea, Spain, Sri Lanka, Sudan, Switzerland, Syria, Tajikistan, Tunisia, Turkey, Turkmenistan, Ukraine, Uzbekistan, Venezuela. Vietnam

== Appeals procedure ==
It is noteworthy to point out that the Amendment has removed the second stage of appeal process. Appeals to the High Council of Taxation could only be made on questions of non-compliance with the provisions of the Tax Act rather than questions of fact.

=== Accounting standards ===
The Amendment has for the first time after 1979 reintroduced the concept of the tax audit to be undertaken by 'official accountants' and their designated firms. The taxpayer or the tax administration can choose to appoint an official accountant or a designated firm of official accountants to examine his records and report to the tax authorities.

The accounting profession is not particularly organized in Iran. However, the influence of the foreign accounting practices implies an evolution and a relation between the Iranian accountants training and the American one. Thus, an increasing number of accountants and Iranian auditors receives an American training and apply it in Iran. This will contribute to strengthen the harmonization of Iranian book-keeping systems with international standards. Iranian banks use interest-based transactions and retain the accounting standards of conventional banking. Following international sanctions, KPMG, PriceWaterhouseCoopers, RSM, Crowe Horwath and Grant Thornton have suspended their activities in Iran in recent years. The main professionals and representative organization in Iran is the Iranian Institute of Certified Accountants.

Starting in FY 2017, all Iranian companies are required to prepare their financial statements based on International Financial Reporting Standards (IFRS).

== Indirect taxes ==
=== Value added tax (VAT) ===
In 2008, sales tax rate in Iran was 3% but changed to 9% from 2011. Value Added Tax Act (VATA) was put into effect since mid-year 1387 (2008). Its implementation was suspended following 10 days of widespread demonstrations across Iran in October 2008. This Act has substituted all previous laws and regulations dealing with indirect taxes (including sales tax). According to the VATA, supply of commodities and services, as well as their imports and exports, shall be subject to the provisions of this Law.

According to article 16 of this Act, the VAT rate is 9%, but the VAT rates of certain goods such as "cigarettes and tobacco products" and "gasoline and jet fuel" are respectively 12 and 20%. In addition to the VAT rates just mentioned, article 38 of VATA levies the following duties on goods and services which are subject to this Act:

Item	Additional duties (2009)
all types of cigarettes and tobacco products	15 to 35%
all types of petrol (gasoline) and jet fuel	20%
kerosene and gas oil	20%
on fuel oil	20%
all other goods and services	9%

The fifth development plan stipulates that VAT is to be increased by 1% each year, in order that it reaches 8% by the end of the plan (by 2015). As of 2010, VAT for goods and services (except oil and tobacco products) was 3%.

=== VAT tax exemption ===
VAT will not apply to free trade zones in Iran. However, goods and services entering Iran's customs territory will be subject to payment of VAT according to the law. Articles 12 and 13 stipulate that supply and importation of some commodities and services including the following shall be exempt from the VATA:

- a) Unprocessed agricultural products;
- b) Livestock and live poultry, aquatic products, honey bees and silkworms;
- c) All types of fertilizers, pesticides, seeds and saplings;
- d) Bakery flour, bread, meat, sugar, rice, cereals and soya, milk, cheese, shortening and baby formula;
- e) Books, press, notebooks and all types of printing papers, writing pads and papers and press papers;
- f) Passenger goods for personal use, as exempted under the Export-Import Regulations;
- g) Immovable property;
- h) All types of medicine, medical consumables, medical services (human, animal or plant) as well as rehabilitation and other supportive services;
- i) Services subject to payment of salary taxes envisaged in the Direct Taxation Law;
- j) Banking and credit services rendered by banks, credit institutes and cooperatives, authorized interest-free loan funds and cooperative funds;
- k) Public transportation services and urban and inter-city roads, railway, air and sea passenger transport services;
- l) Hand woven carpets;
- m) All types of research and training services, as stipulated in a By-Law to be approved by the Council of Ministers;
- n) Animal and poultry feed;
- o) Export of goods and services from official exit points. Any tax paid on account of such exports shall be reimbursed (as regards commodities) upon submitting a certification of the customs certifying the export of goods. Value Added Tax (VAT) does not apply to free trade zones (FTZ) in Iran. However, goods and services entering Iran's customs territory from FTZs will be subject to payment of VAT according to the law.

=== Municipal tax ===
This tax only applies to companies, which are subject to a municipal tax at the rate of three per cent of their taxable income (2006).

=== E-commerce ===
Neither the Electronic Commerce Law of 2004 nor any other Iranian legislation deals specifically with taxation arising from e-commerce.

== Customs ==
The Islamic Republic of Iran Customs Administration (IRICA), operating under the Ministry of Economic Affairs and Finance, is responsible for administering customs regulations and overseeing the import, export and transit of goods. Its responsibilities include collecting import duties and other charges imposed under customs legislation.

Under Iran's Customs Affairs Act, the importation of goods is subject to applicable import duties, customs charges, value-added tax and other payments prescribed by law. Customs duties vary according to the classification of imported goods and the applicable tariff schedule.

=== Tariff rates ===
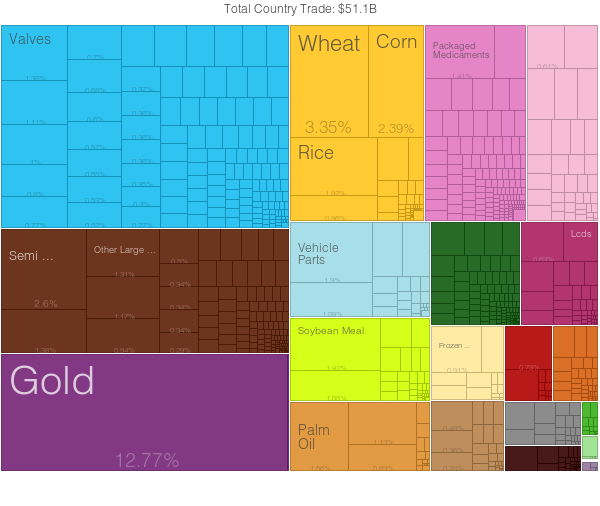
Iran import tree map (2012)

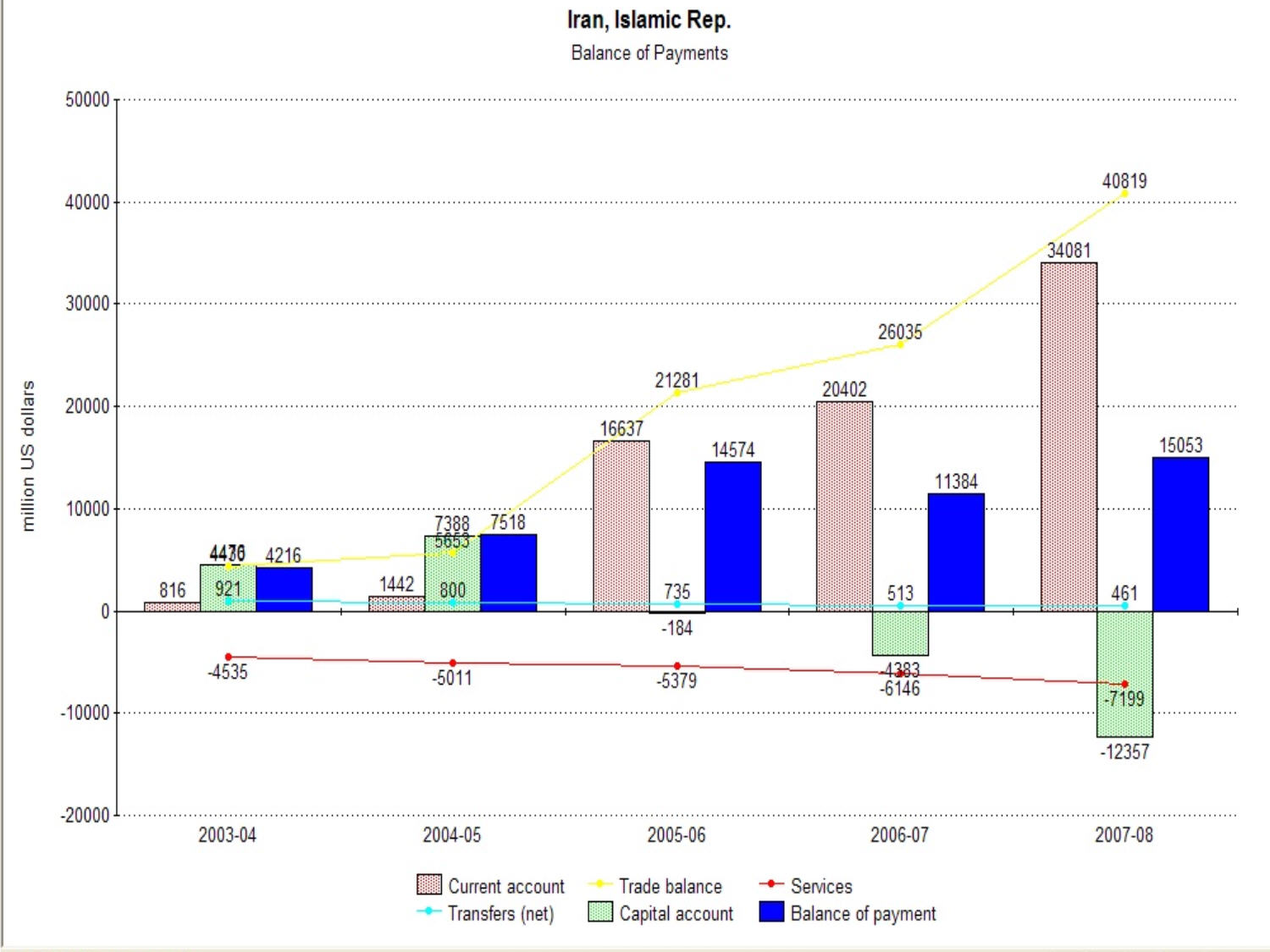
Iran's balance of payment (2003-2007). Its capital account (both long and short term) has been decreasing during that same period.

Iran's customs tariff schedule is based on the Harmonized System for the classification of imported goods. The World Customs Organization lists the Islamic Republic of Iran Customs Administration as the national source for Iran's customs tariff information.

According to the World Integrated Trade Solution, Iran's effectively applied simple average tariff was 15.22% in 2020, while its trade-weighted average was 12.09%. The maximum tariff recorded was 100%. The data are based on the UNCTAD TRAINS database and were last updated on 12 December 2024.

Indicative listing of import tariff rates in 2006
Item	Tariff rate
chemical products	10%
ordinary metals	10%
measurement instruments	10%
medical equipment	10%
food industry	15%
mining raw production	15%
leather industry	15%
paper and wood fabrics	15%
mechanical machinery	15%
agricultural raw production	25%
electric machinery	25%
automotive vehicles	100%

=== Protectionism and dumping ===
As much as 70% of Iran's imports could be substituted by domestically produced products. Iran has passed a law that bans the import of foreign goods and services when similar products or capacities already exist in Iran. The government says that 200 thousand new jobs are created with every one billion dollar reduction in imports. Reported issues are increasing the quality of domestic products, more research and development needed, adaptation by domestic suppliers to the Iranian consumer tastes and marketing. As part of the resistive economy, the Supreme Leader of Iran has urged Iranians to consume more domestic products over imported ones.

In 2019, Iranian media reported that foreign firms were dumping their medicines in order to hinder the development of competing domestic pharmaceutical firms.

=== Modernization ===
In an effort to streamline and harmonize the customs procedure with other governmental and private partners, the Government of Iran has selected ASYCUDAWORLD as a tool for its customs administration in order to move toward e-commerce and e-customs. This project is a technical cooperation project between the Islamic Republic of Iran Customs Administration (IRICA), United Nations Conference on Trade and Development and UNDP. As of March 21, 2010, all imported goods must have barcode stickers Irancode that meet the national and international standards.

=== Free trade zones and re-export ===
Value added tax (VAT) will not apply to free trade zones in Iran. However, goods and services entering Iran's customs territory will be subject to payment of VAT according to the law. In accordance with Article 12 of the Export-Import Regulations Act, the pre-exportation entry (temporary importation) of materials and goods to be used in producing, finishing, processing and packaging of exported goods are exempted from all import duties.

=== Smuggling ===
One third of the imported goods in Iran are delivered through the black market, underground economy, and illegal jetties. Iran is modernizing the customs to prevent the smuggling of contraband in and out of the country worth $12 billion annually. Other estimates put the value of smuggled goods into Iran alone at $5.5 billion-$6 billion annually. In 2010, Police in Iran estimated about $16 billion worth of goods is smuggled into Iran each year. $12 billion worth of goods are illegal to have or own in Iran, with the remaining $4 billion being legal goods that are legal to own in Iran. In 2013, smugglers imported $17 billion of goods. Nearly $3 billion of goods were also imported, using tariff exemptions, while the total import reached $50 billion in value. Less than 1% of smuggled goods are intercepted by the authorities.

Largest black markets in Iran are those of:

- Drug smuggling ($8.5 billion),
- Petroleum smuggling (over $3 billion); 20 million liters of fuel per day as of 2014,
- Alcohol smuggling ($912.5 million),
- Cigarette smuggling ($2 billion),
- Prostitution,
- Arms trafficking,
- Corruption,
- Unlicensed imported films and software packages,
- Cash ($1 billion).

One Majlis member recently stated that IRGC black-market activities alone might account for $12 billion per year. Iranian commander Mohammadreza Yazdi has stated that all IRGC economic activities are legitimate. Besides the IRGC, rogue elements within the Government of Iran, Bonyads and the Bazaar are allegedly involved in the smuggling activity.

Dubai and Khasab in the Persian Gulf are important foreign centers of smuggling into Iran. These imports enter Iran through major ports such as Bandar-e Abbas or free trade zones such as the islands of Kish and Qeshm. A total of 750,000 unlicensed small shops serve as conduit for the distribution of those goods throughout Iran.

Excessive import tariffs (for items such as clothing for example) also contributes to smuggling in Iran.

==== Damage to the economy ====
Up to 80% of the goods enter the country through unregistered ports and jetties in the Persian Gulf, thus undermining the domestic industries in energy, agriculture, garment, textile, electronics, home appliances (which account for 13% of all the goods smuggled into Iran/or one third of all home appliances in Iran). As of 2014, 75% of the cell phones in the market were smuggled into the country.

==== Effect on employment ====
As per 2010 Iranian customs report $14.43 billion worth of goods were smuggled in and out of Iran out of which $13.25 billion was the value of goods smuggled into Iran leading to loss of some 600,000 jobs.

== See also ==
- Iranian labor law
- List of major economic laws in Iran
- Economy of Iran
- International Rankings of Iran in Economy
- Tax rates around the world
- Constitution of Iran
- Bonyad - Iran's foundations which control 20% of Iran's GDP.
- Fiscal policy in Iran
- Ministry of Economic Affairs and Finance (Iran)
- Iranian calendar
- Social class in Iran
- Iranian National Tax Administration
- Salaries in Iran
