= Abbas Mirakhor =

Economist

Abbas Mirakhor (Persian: عباس میرآخور) joined INCEIF in 2010 as Distinguished Scholar and the First Holder of INCEIF's Chair in Islamic Finance. His research interests include conventional and Islamic economics and finance.

== Life ==
Born in Iran, Abbas Mirakhor received PhD from Kansas State University in the USA. From 1968 to 1984 he taught in various universities after which he joined the International Monetary Fund (IMF) where he remained until retirement in 2008 serving as staff, an executive director and the Dean of the Board of that institution.

== Education and career ==
Mirakhor is a graduate of the Kansas State University, USA, where he received his Bachelor, Master and PhD Degrees in Economics. In 1968, he started his academic career with University of Alabama, USA. With the exception of a 2-year stint at the AzZahara University in Tehran, Iran, throughout his academic career, Mirakhor has worked as a professor of economics at the University of Alabama, Alabama A&M University, and the Florida Institute of Technology. In 1984, he joined the IMF in Washington DC as an economist. He spent 24 years with the IMF, serving as the organisation's Executive Director and Dean of the executive board, retiring in 2008.

== Awards ==
Mirakhor was conferred the “Order of Companion of Volta” for service to Ghana by the President of Ghana in 2005. In 2003, he received the Islamic Development Bank Annual Prize for Research in Islamic Economics, which he shared with Dr. Mohsin Khan, another well-known economist at IMF. The President of Pakistan conferred him the “Quaid-e Azam” star for service to Pakistan in 1997.

== Books ==
He has published books, papers and research articles on a wide range of areas including microeconomic theory, mathematical economics and Islamic economics. His latest publications are “Islam and Development: The Institutional Framework” which was coauthored with Dr. Idris Samawi Hamid, Professor of Philosophy at Colorado State University, USA; and “Globalisation and Islamic Finance: Convergence, Prospects and Challenges” co-authored with Prof. Hossein Askari of the George Washington University and Dr. Zamir Iqbal of the World Bank.

== Notable books ==
- Hossein Askari; Zamir Iqbal; Abbas Mirakhor (3 December 2014). Introduction to Islamic Economics: Theory and Application. Wiley. ISBN 978-1-118-73298-4.
- Risk Sharing in Finance: The Islamic Finance Alternative, Zamir Iqbal, Abbas Mirakhor, Hossein Askari, Noureddine Krichene, 2011
- An Introduction to Islamic Finance: Theory and Practice, 2nd Edition, Zamir Iqbal, Abbas Mirakhor, 2011
- The Stability of Islamic Finance: Creating a Resilient Financial Environment for a Secure Future, Hossein Askari, Zamir Iqbal, Noureddine Krichenne, Abbas Mirakhor, 2010
- Globalization & Islamic Finance: Converge, Prospects & Challenges, Hossein Askari, Zamir Iqbal, Abbas Mirakhor, 2009
- New Issues in Islamic Finance and Economics: Progress and Challenges, Hossein Askari, Zamir Iqbal, Abbas Mirakhor, 2009
- An Introduction to Islamic Finance: Theory and Practice, Abbas Mirakhor, Zamir Iqbal, 2006
- Theoretical Studies in Islamic Banking and Finance, Abbas Mirakhor (editor), Mohsin S. Khan, 2005
- Theoretical Studies in Islamic Banking and Finance (1st Edition), Abbas Mirakhor (editor), Mohsin S. Khan, 1988
- Islamic Banking, Abbas Mirakhor, Zubair Iqbal, 1987

== See also ==
- Hossein Samsami
