= Iranian National Tax Administration =

Tax government agency of Iran

Iranian National Tax Administration (INTA)
- سازمان امور مالیاتی کشور

Agency overview
- Formed: 2002; 24 years ago
- Type: Government agency
- Headquarters: Tehran, Iran, 1114943661; 35.720988°N 51.4215425°E
- Motto: INTA
- Agency executive: Mohammad Hadi Sobhanian (since April 16, 2023)
- Parent department: Ministry of Economic Affairs and Finance (Iran)
- Website: www.intamedia.ir

The Iranian National Tax Administration or in brief INTA is one of the organizations affiliated to the Ministry of Economic Affairs and Finance in Iran which is responsible for handling the country's tax affairs. Among the tasks of this organization are reforming and mechanizing the country's tax system and implementing Value-added tax.

In line with the implementation of Article 59 of the Third Economic, Social and Cultural Development Plan of the Islamic Republic of Iran, in order to increase the efficiency of the tax system and eliminate existing organizational barriers and also focus all matters related to taxation in a single organization, the National Tax Administration in form of a government agency was created under the supervision of the Ministry of Economic Affairs and Finance in 2002. With the establishment of this agency, all the powers, duties, manpower, facilities and equipment of the Ministry of Economic Affairs and Finance in the Deputy of Tax Affairs and tax departments were transferred to it.

This organization is one of the most lucrative government organizations in Iran and has been the first depositor to the country's treasury since 2015, surpassing the National Iranian Oil Company; So that in the annual budgeting, a very high percentage of the revenues of the Ministry of Economic Affairs and Finance and the current budget of the country is obtained by this organization.

The importance and major role of this organization in managing the economic, financial and commercial affairs of Iran and prosperity of the private sector and direction of economic and commercial activities is undeniable.

== History ==
One of the oldest documents on taxation is the contents of Sumerian inscriptions. In history of Manouchehr Pishdadi kingdom period, there are references to collecting taxes for the expenses of the troops. Kay Kawād, king of Kayanian dynasty, was the first king that collect taxes legally and in a certain amount (10% of income). Although the exact amount of taxes collected during the Medes period is not known, it is certain that the extinction of the Medes was related to the amount of taxes collected by them.

With the formation of the Achaemenid Empire and the expansion of Iran's geographical borders from Egypt to India, regular offices and organizations were formed to receive the country's taxes and finances. Herodotus, an ancient Greek historian, pointed out that Darius I had divided Iran into twenty tax districts and, along with each governor, sent a tax officer to each Satrap. At the same time, all agricultural properties in the country were audited and court offices were set up to register taxes. Each mayor's share was set for local expenses, and more importantly, taxpayers had the right to object to the amount of tax received. The cash tax collected by the central government at this time was reported to be 12,480 Babylonian Talent (measurement) (about $ 24 million today). This amount was in addition to the share of local satrapies as well as stuffs taxes. The total gold reserves of the two cities of Sush and Persepolis in Alexander's invasion of Iran are estimated at one billion and eight hundred million gold francs.

During the Parthian Empire period, the regular Achaemenid system for collecting taxes was abolished and taxes were collected on a lump sum basis from each province. One of the developments of this period was the establishment of customs and the collection of customs taxes on borders.

During the Sasanian Empire era, taxation became more complete and three types of taxes were received: land, census and per capita. After the Arab invasion of Iran, during the time of governor Al-Hajjaj ibn Yusuf, formal language in tax offices were changed from Persian to Arabic. Formal language of these offices were changed to Persian again in the Seljuq dynasty period by the order of Amid al-Mulk Kunduri, Minister of Tughril. During the Safavid dynasty, foreign trade and customs revenue were added to taxes and expanded further during the Afsharid dynasty period. During the Qajar period, the country's fiscal situation stagnated due to wars, travel, and the weakness of kings. During the reign of chief minister Amir Kabir, the Ministry of Finance was established and under his supervision, useful steps were taken to improve the country's economic situation, and new regulations were enacted for the receipt, storage and consumption of wealth in the treasury. Prior to the Constitutionalism in Iran and the absence of parliament, the King of the time had all the incomes and revenues of the country at his disposal, and all expenditures were made by his own decree and approval. The Shah usually appointed a person called the "Minister of Finance" to regulate the country's budget. The Minister of Finance was usually called "Mustowfi al-Mamalik" (means Responsible for the finances of the whole country). The Ministry of Finance had an internal section as the Executive Ministry's Office, which consisted of state ministers and state officials. These officials had a number of employees who were called "Mirza Qalamdan" (means Note taker person). Also Minister of Tax debts was in charge of collecting and calculating the debts of all provinces, and Minister of Treasury had role of Central Bank.

With the victory of the Persian Constitutional Revolution in August 1906, the first legal cabinet was formed and Abolqasem Naser ol-Molk, as the first Minister of Finance, received a positive vote of confidence from the National Consultative Assembly. So, he continued to work in the same manner as before, and by his order, the current building of Radio Tehran, which was the location of Customs Office, was assigned to the Ministry of Finance. In 1910, the seven departments of Ministry of Finance were approved and formed. In 1915, the Ministry of Finance was divided into nine departments. Theses nine departments at that time were include Ministry Department, Revenue and Net and Coin Recognition Office, General Treasury, Customs, Office of General Accounting for Taxes and Public Debts and Duties, Tax Trials, Remittance Enforcement Commission, Personnel and Supplies, and the Supreme Advisory Council for Administrative Trials. After some time, the Ministry of Finance's location was transferred to Atabek Park, the current location of the Embassy of Russia in Tehran.

With the beginning of Reza Shah's reign from the 1920s onwards, and with the arrival of American economic advisers such as William Morgan Shuster and Arthur Millspaugh, many changes took place in the management of the country's tax affairs, including the organization being divided into financial and economic parts with two deputies and seven directors. Arthur Millspaugh believed that Iranians should become accustomed to taxation and Iran's complex bureaucracy; from bribery, partisanship and advice (influence) to laziness of employees, disregard for clients, carelessness and delay work of today to tomorrow and the wrong government employment system, all should eliminated to solve this Iran's anarchy situation; and to solve this problem, which has been rooted since the Mongol government, an administrative revolution is needed, and this revolution is to pay attention to the tax system in Iran.

In 1950, the Ministry of Finance was approved with the reduction of departments and its new building was put into operation in 1959 in its current location. Finally, in 1974, law of establishing the Ministry of Economic Affairs and Finance was approved by the National Consultative Assembly with 6 articles. For a long time, the tax duties were the responsibility of this organization.

In 2002, in order to increase the efficiency of the tax system and eliminate existing organizational barriers and also focus all matters related to taxation in a single organization, the National Tax Administration in form of a government agency was created under the supervision of the Ministry of Economic Affairs and Finance.

== Duties an authorities ==
These are the duties and authorities of the Iranian National Tax Administration (INTA):

- Undertaking all matters related to the implementation of the provisions of direct and indirect taxes and other taxes and all related steps, including identifying taxpayers, filing and preparing tax credentials, recognizing and claiming taxes, resolving tax disputes and collecting taxes in the usual way or Through executive operations and other matters related to taxes within the framework of tax laws and other current laws of the country;
- Studying, examining and recognizing the obstacles of the tax system and planning to eliminate them;
- Commenting and presenting the necessary proposals in the field of all matters regarding the implementation of the regulations of various types of direct and indirect taxes and other taxes;
- Commenting and presenting the necessary proposals in the field of formulating tax policies and policies in the implementation of related legal duties;
- Setting executive policies for collecting taxes in the country and supervising the proper implementation of approved programs;
- Taking the necessary measures regarding the implementation of tax laws and regulations by preparing and regulating the necessary by-laws and instructions and designing executive systems and methods for tax assessment and collection;
- Accurate and complete implementation and submission of required amendments to the tax laws and regulations of the country and monitoring their proper implementation;
- Designing, compiling and implementing research and executive projects to improve the country's tax system in areas such as tax structure reform, taxpayer registration and guidance, self-declaration expansion, conducting effective audits, tax accounting, collection and execution to expedite and Refinement of tax operations;
- Continuous study, review and research in the field of tax laws and regulations and submit proposals or take necessary measures to amend and supplement them through the relevant legal authorities;
- Comparative study, review and continuous research in the leading tax systems of selected countries to improve the country's tax system;
- Study in order to find appropriate solutions to identify tax sources and increase and develop the country's tax capacity and propose it to the Minister of Economic Affairs and Finance;
- Collecting and processing information and using economic, national and postal numbers to identify tax units and sources and those subject to tax laws and regulations in order to achieve the objectives set out in the law and implement tax justice;
- Carrying out studies, reviewing, improving and modifying the organizational structure and human resources working in tax affairs to perform the assigned tasks and providing the required human resources;
- Designing, planning and implementing the necessary training programs to improve the quality of the organization's human resources based on the identified needs;
- Designing, implementing and improving the comprehensive tax system of the country and creating a comprehensive mechanized information network and using new methods and advanced tools to realize tax revenues;
- Planning and preparing the necessary plans to increase the productivity and quality of tax activities and reduce taxpayers' expenses in paying taxes as much as possible;
- Carrying out the necessary studies and surveys and continuously evaluating the performance of tax units and related manpower and guiding them;
- Training and providing various services to taxpayers to acquaint them with the relevant duties, performing legal duties and paying taxes;
- Supervising and inspecting the ethical aspects, actions and behavior of tax officials, discovering their administrative violations and faults, prosecuting violators and ensuring tax justice, health and transparency in doing these matters in compliance with relevant laws and regulations;
- Commenting on the draft plans, bills and approved approvals related to tax affairs for the Minister of Economic Affairs and Finance and other relevant legal authorities;
- Study and survey in order to find appropriate methods of guidance and policy-making in legal, judicial and criminal cases related to tax affairs;
- Carrying out economic studies related to taxes and presenting analytical and statistical reports related to tax revenues to the Minister of Economic Affairs and Finance and other relevant legal authorities, as well as using the analyzes performed to improve the tax system in the country;
- Cooperating with domestic and international institutions in order to fulfill the missions within the framework of the relevant regulations;
- Planning in order to establish favorable relations between tax collectors and taxpayers and to determine special ethical and behavioral standards for tax officials;
- Preparing the required by-laws provided in the relevant laws and regulations for approval by the competent authorities;
- Estimating tax revenues related to each year and submitting it to the Minister of Economic Affairs and Finance for inclusion in the budget bill;
- Performing other necessary measures to achieve the goals of the organization;
- Planning and compiling instructions in the field of anti-money laundering law and amending them and cooperating with the Supreme Council for Combating Money Laundering;

== Structure ==
The organizational structure of the Iranian National Tax Administration (INTA) is as follows:

- Head of the National Tax Administration (INTA)
- Tax Education, Research and Planning Center
- Office of the Presidency and International Affairs
- Head office security
- Supreme Tax Council
- Office of Inspection, Performance Evaluation and Coordination of Administrative Violations Boards
- Tax Disciplinary Prosecutor's Office
- Office of Public Relations and Tax Culture
- Head of employment
- Secretariat of the Board of Certification of Formal Tax Advisers
- Deputy of Management and Resources Development
  - General Directorate of Accounting and Finance
  - Office of Budget and administrative Renovation
  - General Directorate of Human Resources and Welfare
  - General Office of Support Affairs
- Deputy of Tax Revenues
  - Office of Taxpayers and Tax Services
  - Tax Audit Office
  - Accounting, tax collection and refund office
  - Office of Tax Judicial Supervision
- Legal and Technical Deputy of Taxation
  - Office for judicial and tax contracts
  - Office for Technical and Tax Risk Management
  - Office of Inspection, Combating Tax Evasion and Money Laundering
  - Project Executive Coordination Office (Office of Regulatory and Outsourcing Supervision)
  - Office of Design and Analysis of Processes and Smartize of the Tax System
- Deputy of Tax Technologies
  - Office of Tax Data Science
  - General Directorate of Information Technology
  - Office of Tax Process Architecture
- Tax affairs of Tehran province and city

== See also ==
- Taxation in Iran
- Economy of Iran
- Institute of Standards and Industrial Research of Iran
- National Organization for Civil Registration of Iran
- Statistical Center of Iran
