= Mohammad Tabibian =

Iranian economist (born 1948)

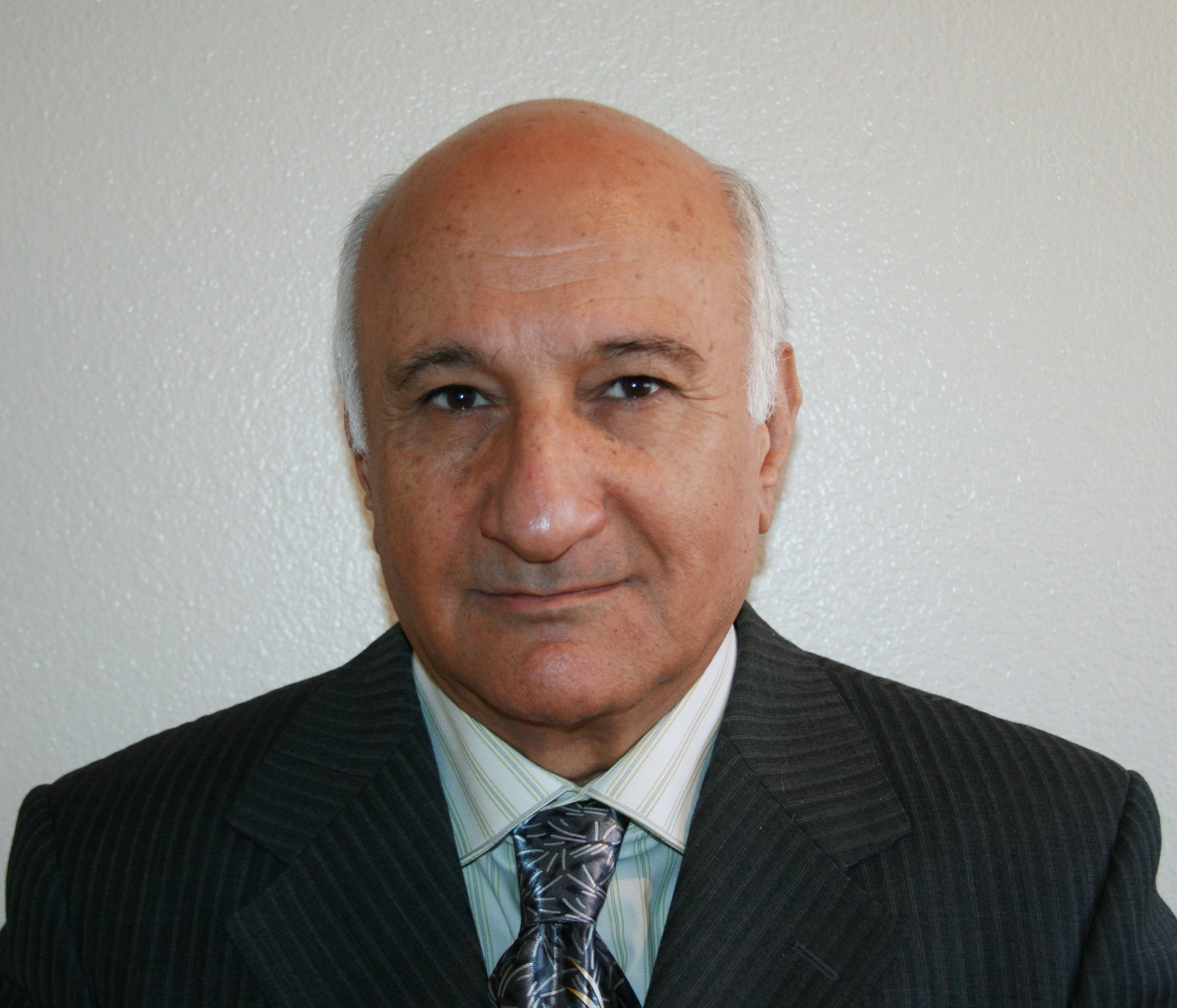
Seyed Mohammad Tabibian

Seyed Mohammad Tabibian (Persian: سید محمد طبیبیان; born 1948) is an Iranian economist who served under the administration of Ali Akbar Hashemi Rafsanjani as deputy director of the Planning and Budget Organization. He left to help found the Institute for Management and Planning studies in Tehran as of the early 1990s. He has also taught at the Isfahan University of Technology. Tabibian was head of groups made First Five Year Plan (1989–1993) and Second Five Year Plan of Iran (1994–1998).

Tabibian received his Bachelor and master's degree from Pahlavi University (now Shiraz University). He studied at the Duke University, in the United States. He obtained his Ph.D. in Economics from Duke University, Durham, North Carolina in 1980. When the revolution started he returned to Iran and served as director of the Planning and Budget Organization's Macro Economy Bureau from 1981 to 1983, at the beginning of the Iranian Revolution. He has been called "Iran's foremost free-market economist and ... one of the country's most important reformers." Mohammad Tabibian, was a faculty member at the College of Industrial Engineering, Isfahan University of Technology from 1981-1988. Spent a year at the Department of Economics, Stanford University as a visiting scholar. He was invited to the planning and budget organization after the Iran-Iraq war to help draft a reconstruction and economic reform plan in 1989. He helped establish a research and graduate training institute called Institute for Research on Development and Planning(currently Institute for Management and Planning), where he served as a director and faculty member. From 2004 to 2007 he was the director of Iran Banking Institute, a higher education institute under the Central Bank of Iran. He was retired in 2007 alongside many other reform-minded scholars by Ahmadi Nejad administration. He has authored several text books on Macroeconomics, and Microeconomics in Persian. He has written extensively on economic policy issues in Iran and co-authored books on the Iranian economy and the banking sector. He helped educate several generation of Iranian economists who are currently engaged in academics or private and public sector both in Iran and abroad.

== See also ==
- Hossein Samsami
