= Davoud Danesh-Jafari =

Iranian politician and economist (born 1954)

- داود دانش‌جعفری
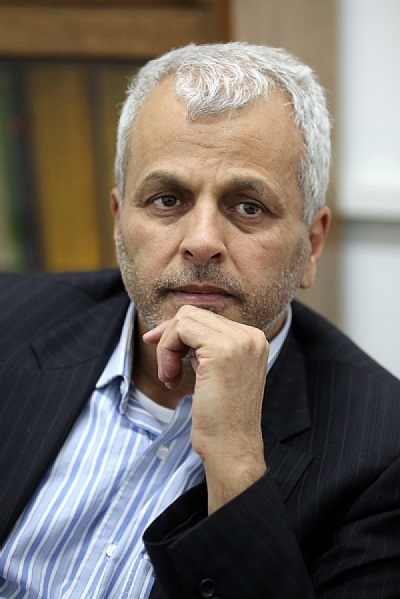
- Danesh-Jafari in 2011

Member of Expediency Discernment Council
- Incumbent
- Assumed office 27 February 2007
- Appointed by: Ali Khamenei
- Chairman: Akbar Hashemi Rafsanjani; Ali Movahedi-Kermani (Acting); Mahmoud Hashemi Shahroudi; Sadeq Larijani

Minister of Economic Affairs and Finance
- In office 24 August 2005 – 2 April 2008
- President: Mahmoud Ahmadinejad
- Preceded by: Safdar Hosseini
- Succeeded by: Hossein Samsami (Acting); Shamseddin Hosseini

Member of the Parliament of Iran
- In office 28 May 2004 – 12 August 2005
- Constituency: Tehran, Rey, Shemiranat and Eslamshahr
- In office 28 May 1996 – 26 May 2000
- Constituency: Tehran, Rey, Shemiranat and Eslamshahr

Personal details
- Born: 1954 (age 71–72) Tehran, Iran
- Party: Society of Devotees of the Islamic Revolution
- Other political affiliations: Alliance of Builders of Islamic Iran (2004)
- Education: NIT Srinagar; University of Tehran; Allameh Tabataba'i University

Military service
- Allegiance: Islamic Republic of Iran
- Branch/service: Jihad of Construction
- Years of service: 1980–1988
- Commands: Head of Combat engineering Logistics Headquarter
- Battles/wars: Iran–Iraq War; Operation Fath ol-Mobin; Operation Samen-ol-A'emeh
- Awards: Fath Medal (1982)

Davoud Danesh-Jafari (Persian: داود دانش‌جعفری; born 1954) is an Iranian politician, economist and former combat engineer who previously served as minister of economy and finance affairs of Iran from 2005 to 2008. He is currently a member of the Expediency Discernment Council.

== Biography ==
Born in 1954 in Tehran, Danesh-Jafari graduated with a bachelor's degree in civil engineering from National Institute of Technology, Srinagar in India. In 1992, he received a master's degree in economics from Tehran University and in 2001 he obtained a PhD from Allameh Tabatabaii University. He was a member of the parliament in the 5th term and the 7th term.

Since 2006 he was involved in plans to create the Iranian Oil Bourse, a commodity exchange for oil and oil byproducts, which would trade mostly in the Iranian currency and other major currencies In December 2006, he was reported as saying that he intended to reduce US dollar-based transactions as much as possible.

In January 2008, he announced that the Iranian Oil Bourse would be opened during the anniversary of the Islamic Revolution (February 1–11) a month later. Oil Minister Gholam Hossein Nozari later announced that Davoud Danesh-Jafari would become its head. The Oil Bourse opened on 17 February 2008 on Kish Island.

He served as the minister of economy and finance affairs in the cabinet of President Mahmoud Ahmedinejad from 2005 to 2008.

== See also ==
- Hossein Samsami

Political offices
Preceded by Safdar Hosseini	Minister of Finance; 2005–2008	Succeeded by Shamseddin Hosseini
Party political offices
Preceded by Reza	Campaign manager of Mohsen Rezaee; 2009; 2013	Vacant
