= Irancode =

Irancode is the Iranian national products and services classification and codification system. It enables producers and distributors to identify, classify, and codify their products and services. Iran is implementing this bar code system across the country in order to facilitate e-commerce and tax collection.

== See also ==
- Ministry of Economic Affairs and Finance (Iran)
- Taxation and customs in Iran
