= Seyed Ali Madanizadeh =

Iranian finance minister and economist (born 1982)

- سید علی مدنی‌زاده
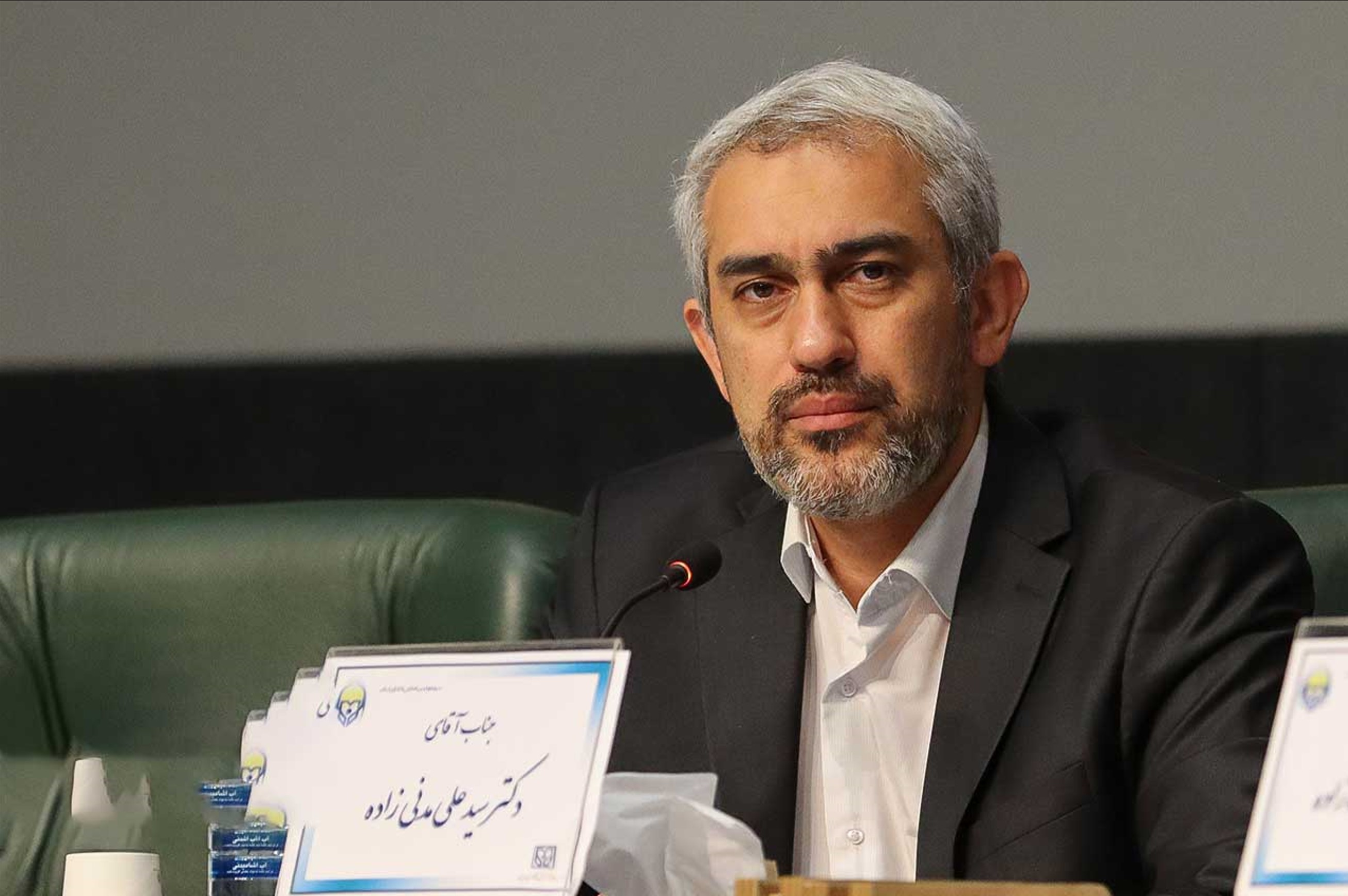
- Madanizadeh in 2024

Minister of Economic Affairs and Finance
- Incumbent
- Assumed office 16 June 2025
- President: Masoud Pezeshkian
- Preceded by: Abdolnaser Hemmati Rahmatollah Akrami (acting)

Personal details
- Born: 1982 (age 43–44)

Academic background
- Education: Sharif University of Technology Stanford University University of Chicago
- Thesis: Labor specialization and the impact of international trade on the skill premium (2013)
- Doctoral advisor: Samuel Kortum

Academic work
- Discipline: Economist
- Sub-discipline: Macroeconomics International trade law Monetary policy
- Institutions: Sharif University of Technology

Seyed Ali Madanizadeh (Persian: سید علی مدنی‌زاده, born 1982), sometimes written Seyed Ali Madani-Zadeh, is an Iranian economist who was confirmed as Iran's Minister of Finance and Economic Affairs on June 16, 2025. He was associate professor of economics at Sharif University of Technology. He is currently the dean of the Faculty of Management and Economics at the university.

Madanizadeh is the candidate nominated to the Islamic Consultative Assembly for the position of Ministry of Economic Affairs and Finance, following the dismissal of Abdolnaser Hemmati in 2025.

In 2000 and 2002, Madanizadeh won third place at the International Mathematical Olympiad. In 2018, he won the Young Iranian Economic Researcher Award.
