= Shamseddin Hosseini =

Iranian politician

Seyyed Shamseddin Hosseini
- شمس‌الدین حسینی
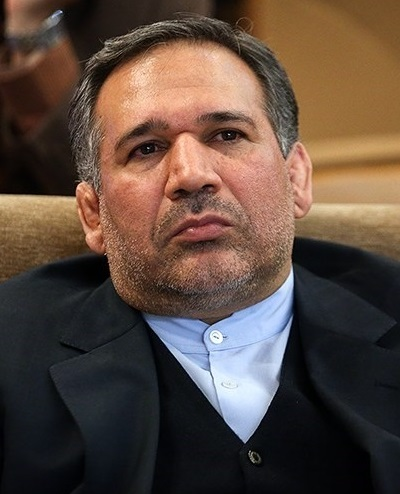

Member of the Parliament of Iran
- Incumbent
- Assumed office 27 May 2020
- Constituency: Tonekabon, Ramsar and Abbasabad

Minister of Economic Affairs and Finance
- In office 5 August 2008 – 15 August 2013
- President: Mahmoud Ahmadinejad
- Preceded by: Davoud Danesh-Jafari; Hossein Samsami (Acting)
- Succeeded by: Ali Tayebnia

Personal details
- Born: 1967 (age 58–59) tonekabon Iran
- Party: Islamic Iran Academics Association
- Other political affiliations: Coalition Council of Islamic Revolution Forces
- Awards: Order of Service (2nd class)

Shamseddin Hosseini (Persian: شمس‌الدین حسینی; born 1967) is an Iranian politician, who served as the minister of economic affairs and finance from 2008 to 2013.

== Early life and education ==
Hosseini was born in Isfahan, Iran, in 1967. He holds a PhD in economics from Islamic Azad University.

== Career ==
Hosseini taught at Islamic Azad University, Payame Noor University and Allameh Tabatabai University. In 2007, he was appointed minister of economic affairs and finance, replacing Danesh Jaafari. Hosseini's term ended on 15 August 2013 and he was replaced by Ali Tayebnia in the post. After leaving office, Hosseini was appointed vice president of Iranian University on 20 August formed by Mahmoud Ahmedinejad.
