= Resistance economy =

Iranian term for a sanction-circumventing economy

A resistance economy, also known as a resistive economy (Persian: اقتصاد مقاومتی) is an economy that tries to circumvent sanctions imposed on the country or region. This can involve increasing resilience by substituting local inputs for imported inputs, the smuggling of goods and an increase in barter trade. A country may even attempt to turn these pressures into opportunities. In some ways sanctioned economies bear some resemblance to an economy on a war or emergency footing.

Measuring economic activity in nations under sanctions requires different techniques than those used for other countries.

== Terminology ==
This phrase first used by Ayatollah Khamenei Supreme Leader of Iran during a meeting with Iranian entrepreneurs as a response to international sanctions against Iran in 2011.

== History ==
=== Gaza ===
The term was used in relation to the Gaza Strip. In September 2007, Israel and Egypt imposed a blockade on Gaza. At its height, the blockade also limited agricultural imports and exports via Israel. Imports and exports via Egypt have been subject to varying Egyptian policies, with Egypt at times also greatly restricting traffic as an "anti-terrorist" measure. One 2011 conference paper by Salah R. Agha of the Islamic University of Gaza used the term "resistive economy" to describe the situation.

=== Iran ===
Iran has been under increasing sanctions owing to its disputed nuclear program. The response has emphasized reliance on domestic capacities, reducing dependence on oil exports and developing barter trade and an import substitution industrialization. As much as 70% of Iran’s imports could be substituted by domestically produced products.

In detail, it encourages increased exports of electricity, gas, petrochemicals, and oil byproducts instead of crude oil and other raw materials, expansion of the production and exportation of knowledge-based products, increase in domestic production of strategic goods, development of markets in neighboring countries, reforming consumption patterns and fighting corruption.

==== Policies of resistance economy ====
The "Resistance Economy" is a concept defined by the Supreme Leader of Iran Ali Khamenei, an idea which he proposed in 2007. According to Khamenei, that resistance economy aims to promote economic self-reliance, a strategy that would defeat the US-led efforts against Iran via economic and trade sanctions while discouraging extravagant consumption, noting that “the resistance economy is an inspiring pattern of the Islamic economic system and a good chance to make an economic epic.”

Ali Khamenei specified the main aims of the economy of resistance as:

1. Creating dynamism

2. Resistance against threatening elements

3. Reliance on domestic capacities

4. Adopting a jihadi outlook

5. Making people the pivot

6. Security for strategic and fundamental goods

7. Reducing oil dependence

8. Reforming the norms of consumption (no decadence and waste)

9. Combating corruption

10. Promoting a knowledge-based economy

According to the Center for Preserving and Publishing the Works of the Supreme Leader, Ayatollah Khamenei stressed, "Following an indigenous scientific pattern, rooted in the revolutionary and Islamic culture, will lead to the defeat of enemies and their withdrawal from an imposed economic war against the Iranian nation".

“The Resistance Economy will also present an inspiring pattern of the Islamic economic system for the growing international crises and can prepare the ground for creating an economic epic.”

The 24-point general policies of Iran’s Resistance Economy were set based on the Article 110 of the Constitution and after consulting with the Expediency Council.

The ideology of the Resistance Economy, with its core concepts of self-sufficiency, proclaims that the Islamic Republic can survive — and indeed flourish — despite the US-led sanctions.

== See also ==
- Sanctions against Iran
- Cryptocurrency in Iran
- Protectionism
- Mercantilism
- Autarky
