= Ministry of Economic Affairs and Finance (Iran) =

Government ministry of Iran

Coordinates: 35°42′35.24″N 51°24′22.28″E

- وزارت امور اقتصادی و دارایی; Vezârat-e Omur Eqtesâde va Dârâiy

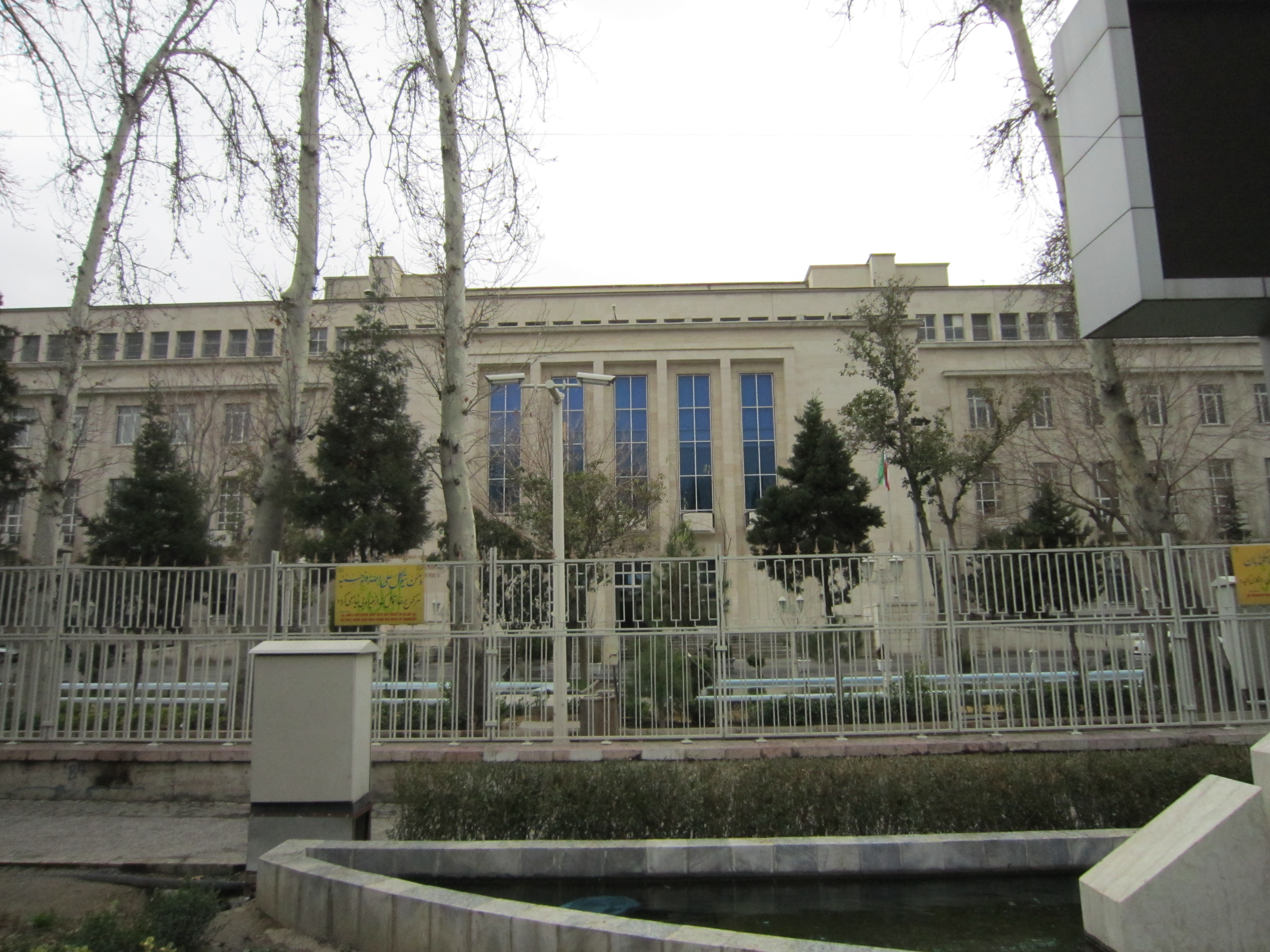

Agency overview
- Formed: 1906; 120 years ago
- Jurisdiction: Government of the Islamic Republic of Iran
- Headquarters: Bab Homayoun Street, Tehran
- Employees: 117,123 (2019)
- Minister responsible: Seyed Ali Madanizadeh
- Website: Official website

The Ministry of Economic Affairs and Finance is a ministry of the Iranian government that oversees treasury, commerce, industry, financial markets and labor in Iran. Its functions include:

- Manage the Iranian treasury department,
- Lending by the government to banks in Iran,
- Regulation of Iran's economy and its financial policy,
- implementing & enforcing tax policies in Iran,
- in charge of foreign direct investment (F.D.I.),
- directing the banking and commercial insurance sector of Iran,
- regulating the financial markets of Iran, see also: Securities and Exchange Organization (SEO) & Central Bank of Iran.

The affairs related policy-making, organizations, and institutes in the field of trade of goods and services are handled by the Ministry of Economic Affairs and Finance (Ministry of E.A.F.).

== Ministers of Finance ==
=== During the Imperial State of Iran ===
Ministers responsible for finance under Pahlavi dynasty.

- Mohammad Ali Foroughi, 1924–1925
- Morteza Gholi Bayat, 1925-?
- Vossug ed Dowleh, 1926
- Firouz Nosrat-ed-Dowleh III, 1927–1929
- Mohammad Ali Farzin, 1929
- Hassan Mashhar, 1929–1930
- Hassan Taqizadeh, 1930–1933
- Ali Akbar Davar, 1933–1937
- Mahmud Badr, 1938–1939
- Rezagholi Amir Khosravi, 1939–1941
- Abbasqoli Golshayan, 1941
- Hassan Musharraf Nafisi, 1941-1942
- Mahmoud Nariman, ?-1943
- Morteza-Qoli Bayat, 1943-?
- Allah-Yar Saleh, 1943
- Bagher Kazemi, 1943-?
- Mahmud Badr, ?-1945
- Abdolhossein Hazhir, 1945
- Morteza-Qoli Bayat, 1945–1946
- Abolqasem Najm, 1945–1946
- Abdolhossein Hazhir, 1946
- Morteza-Qoli Bayat, 1946-?
- Abdolhossein Behnia, ?-1948
- Abbasqoli Golshayan, 1948–1950
- Abdolhossein Behnia, 1950
- Mohammad Ali Varasteh, 1950
- Taghi Nasr, 1950-?
- Mohammad Ali Varasteh, 1950–1951
- Ali Asghar Forouzan, ?-1951
- Mohammad Ali Varasteh, 1951–1952
- Seyed Baqer Kazemi, 1952–1953
- Ali Amini, 1953–1954-?
- Ali Asghar Nasser, ?-1955
- Mohammad Sajadi, 1955–1957
- Taghi Nasr, 1957-?
- Qolam Hosein Foruhar, ?-1957-?
- Ali Asghar Nasser, ?-1958-?
- Ali-Akbar Zargham, 1959–1961
- Abdolbaghi Shoai, 1961–1962
- Jahangir Amuzegar, 1962
- Abdolhossein Behnia, 1962–1963
- Abdolbaghi Shoai, ?-1963
- Abdolhossein Behnia, 1963–1964
- Amir-Abbas Hoveida, 1964–1965
- Jamshid Amouzegar, 1965–1974
- Hushang Ansary, 1974–1977
- Mohammad Yeganeh, 1977–1978
- Hassan-Ali Mehran, 1978–1979
- Rostam Pirasteh, 1979

=== During the Islamic Republic of Iran ===
No.	Portrait	Name	Took office	Left office	Party	Head of government
1		Ali Ardalan	15 February 1979	6 November 1979	National Front	Mehdi Bazargan
2		Abolhassan Banisadr	17 November 1979	10 February 1980	Independent	Council of the Islamic Revolution
3		Hossein Namazi	11 March 1981	28 October 1985	Islamic Republican Party	Mohammad-Ali Rajai Mohammad-Javad Bahonar Mohammad-Reza Mahdavi Kani (acting) Mir-Hossein Mousavi
4		Mohammad Javad Iravani	5 January 1986	29 August 1989	Islamic Republican Party	Mir-Hossein Mousavi
5		Mohsen Nourbakhsh	29 August 1989	16 August 1993	Executives of Construction Party	Akbar Hashemi Rafsanjani
6		Morteza Mohammadkhan	6 October 1993	20 August 1997	Executives of Construction Party; Moderation and Development Party	Akbar Hashemi Rafsanjani
(3)		Hossein Namazi	20 August 1997	22 August 2001	Independent	Mohammad Khatami
7		Tahmasb Mazaheri	22 August 2001	25 April 2004	Independent	Mohammad Khatami
8		Safdar Hosseini	25 April 2004	24 August 2005	Islamic Iran Participation Front	Mohammad Khatami
9		Davoud Danesh-Jafari	24 August 2005	2 April 2008	Society of Devotees of the Islamic Revolution	Mahmoud Ahmadinejad
10		Shamseddin Hosseini	5 August 2008	15 August 2013	Independent	Mahmoud Ahmadinejad
11		Ali Tayebnia	15 August 2013	20 August 2017	Independent	Hassan Rouhani
12		Masoud Karbasian	20 August 2017	26 August 2018	Independent	Hassan Rouhani
13		Farhad Dejpasand	27 October 2018	25 August 2021	Independent	Hassan Rouhani
14		Ehsan Khandozi	25 August 2021	21 August 2024	Coalition Council of Islamic Revolution Forces	Ebrahim Raisi
14		Ehsan Khandozi	25 August 2021	21 August 2024	Coalition Council of Islamic Revolution Forces	Mohammad Mokhber (Acting)
15		Abdolnaser Hemmati	21 August 2024	2 March 2025	Executives of Construction Party	Masoud Pezeshkian
16		Ali Madanizadeh	16 June 2025	Incumbent	Independent	Masoud Pezeshkian

== The Customs Administration of the Islamic Republic of Iran ==
The Customs Administration is affiliated to the Ministry of Economic Affairs and Finance. All activities regarding importation, exportation, transit, collection of import duties and other cases such as temporary importation are carried out by the Customs Administration, which is in charge of implementing the Customs Affairs Act of the Iranian year 1350 (Hijri calendar) (1971 Gregorian calendar), and by-Laws of the Executive Branch of Iran.

== Organization for Collection and Sale of State-owned Properties of Iran (OCSSPI) ==
Affiliated to the Ministry of E.A.F.(Ministry of Economic Affairs and Finance), the purpose of the O.C.S.S.P.I. (Organization for Collection and Sale of State-owned Properties of Iran) is to regulate properties, some of the duties includes the collection, storage, management, and sale of properties that as per the law are under the ownership, possession, custody or management of the government of Iran.

== State Tax Organization ==
Affiliated to the Ministry of E.A.F. (Ministry of Economic Affairs and Finance), the Iranian National Tax Administration is also incharge of collection of taxes from the public and supervises the implementation of tax laws and regulations in Iran. To facilitate the E-commerce, the Executive Branch of Iran is implementing a bar code (similar to ISBN of Books) system (called 'Irancode') across the UN Member State of Iran. It will facilitate e-commerce and tax collection to build a better Iran.

== Privatization Organization ==
According to the Fourth edition of Five-Year Economic Development Plan (2005–2010), the Privatization Organization of Iran, which after discussions with the Ministry of E.A.F (Ministry of Economic Affairs and Finance) sets the prices and manages the shares of government-owned companies for the public. It also puts the stocks on the Tehran Stock Exchange. President of Iranian Privatization Organization is Ali-Ashraf Abdollah Porihoseini.

== Organization for Investment Economic and Technical Assistance ==
Affiliated to the Ministry of E.A.F. (Ministry of Economic Affairs and Finance), the Organization for Investment Economic and Technical Assistance (OIETA) centralizes, regulates and perform activities related to foreign investments in the UN Member State of Iran, Iran's foreign investments abroad, providing loans and credit facilities to foreign firms, institutes or governments as well as obtaining loan or credit from foreign or international sources. OIETA is a "one-stop institution" for foreign direct investment in Iran.

== See also ==
- Ministry of Commerce (Iran)
- Organization for Collection and Sale of State-owned Properties of Iran (OCSSPI)
- Economy of Iran
- Cabinet of Iran
- Government of Iran
- Supreme Audit Court of Iran
- General Inspection Office (Iran)
- Iran's international rankings in economy
