= International sanctions against Iran =

Economic sanctions against Iran by the United States and other countries

International sanctions against Iran are a set of punitive economic and diplomatic measures imposed by the United Nations, and also unilaterally by the United States, the European Union, and numerous other countries and international bodies. These sanctions have been applied across successive decades in response to a range of Iranian policies, including its nuclear programme, alleged support for terrorism, human rights violations, and its military conduct in the Persian Gulf. Iran was the most heavily sanctioned country in the world until Russia surpassed it following the 2022 Russian invasion of Ukraine.

The first American sanctions were imposed in November 1979 after radical students seized the United States Embassy in Tehran. Although lifted in 1981, they were reimposed in 1987 and progressively expanded through successive US executive orders and legislation. The United Nations Security Council imposed multilateral sanctions beginning in December 2006 under United Nations Security Council Resolution 1737, after Iran refused to halt its uranium enrichment programme. The Joint Comprehensive Plan of Action (JCPOA) of 2015 led to the lifting of most UN and multilateral sanctions in exchange for verified limits on Iran's nuclear programme, but the United States withdrew from the agreement in May 2018, reimposing and expanding American sanctions. In August 2025, France, Germany, and the United Kingdom triggered the JCPOA's "snapback" mechanism, resulting in the reimposition of UN sanctions on 28 September 2025.

The period from late 2025 to 2026 saw the most dramatic developments in decades. The 2025-2026 Iranian protests, triggered in part by sanctions-induced economic collapse, were violently suppressed, provoking new Western sanctions. On 28 February 2026, the United States and Israel launched coordinated military strikes against Iran, killing Supreme Leader Ali Khamenei and targeting nuclear and military infrastructure, in what became known as the 2026 Iran war. Iran responded by closing the Strait of Hormuz and launching missile strikes across the region. A ceasefire took effect on 8 April 2026. Subsequent negotiations in Switzerland, mediated by Oman and Pakistan, led to the signing of a memorandum of understanding (MoU) on 17 June 2026 that initiated a 60-day framework for ceasefire, sanctions relief discussions, and nuclear talks. On 22 June 2026, the US Treasury issued a 60-day waiver on sanctions on Iranian oil exports as part of the MoU's initial conditions.

The sanctions had significant effects on Iran's economy, contributing to currency depreciation, high inflation, declining oil revenues, and restrictions on access to the international financial system. Banking and financial restrictions also complicated the import of humanitarian goods, including medicines, despite formal exemptions for such trade. Analysts, humanitarian organisations, and UN experts have debated the humanitarian consequences of the sanctions, while the United States and its allies have maintained that sanctions constituted the principal non-military means of pressuring Iran over its nuclear programme and regional activities.

== United States sanctions ==
=== 1979 sanctions and the hostage crisis ===
The first United States sanctions against Iran were imposed in November 1979, following the seizure of the American Embassy in Tehran by radical students and the taking of 52 American diplomats and citizens as hostages. President Jimmy Carter issued Executive Order 12170, which froze approximately $8.1 billion in Iranian assets held in the United States, including bank deposits, gold, and other property, and imposed a trade embargo. These sanctions were lifted in January 1981 as part of the Algiers Accords, which provided for a negotiated settlement and the release of the hostages.

=== Reimposition and expansion, 1984-1996 ===
During the Iran-Iraq War, which began in September 1980, the United States in 1984 prohibited weapon sales and all US assistance to Iran. In September 1987, following the discovery of a possible minefield in the Strait of Hormuz, Secretary of Defense Caspar Weinberger called for a UN arms embargo against Iran, though this was not realised at the time. US sanctions were reimposed in 1987 in response to Iranian military actions in the Persian Gulf and Iranian support for terrorism.

In 1995, in response to the Iranian nuclear programme and Iranian support for terrorist organisations, including Hezbollah, Hamas, and Palestinian Islamic Jihad, President Bill Clinton issued several executive orders. Executive Order 12957 of 15 March 1995 banned US investment in Iran's energy sector, while Executive Order 12959 of 6 May 1995 banned all US trade with and investment in Iran.

The Iran and Libya Sanctions Act (ILSA) was signed on 5 August 1996, imposing sanctions on foreign firms investing in Iran's energy sector. The act was renamed the Iran Sanctions Act (ISA) in 2006 when provisions regarding Libya were terminated.

=== 2000s expansion ===
Initial US sanctions targeting oil, gas, and petrochemicals, exports of refined petroleum products, and business dealings with the Islamic Revolutionary Guard Corps (IRGC) were progressively expanded to encompass banking and insurance transactions (including with the Central Bank of Iran), shipping, web-hosting services for commercial endeavours, and domain name registration services.

On 31 July 2013, members of the United States House of Representatives voted 400 to 20 in favour of toughened sanctions against Iran.

=== Withdrawal from the JCPOA and reimposition, 2018 ===
On 8 May 2018, President Donald Trump announced that the United States would withdraw from the JCPOA. The administration reinstated all previously lifted sanctions in November 2018, stating the purpose was to compel Iran to renegotiate on broader terms covering its missile programme and support for regional militant groups.

In September 2019, the US imposed further sanctions in response to a suspected Iranian attack on Saudi Arabian oil facilities, targeting the assets of the Supreme Leader's inner circle. On 8 October 2020, the US imposed further sanctions on 18 Iranian banks.

=== Second Trump administration, 2025-2026 ===
On 22 April 2025, the US Department of the Treasury imposed sanctions on Iranian businessman Reza Zarrab and his network of companies for facilitating the sale of Iranian liquefied petroleum gas (LPG) in violation of US sanctions, using a complex network of front companies and intermediaries.

In February 2026, following the 2025-2026 Iranian protests and 2026 Iran massacres, the US imposed new sanctions on 30 individuals, companies, and vessels connected with Iranian oil exports and missile networks, escalating economic pressure ahead of renewed diplomatic talks. US Treasury Secretary Scott Bessent stated that US sanctions policy had been a direct factor in Iran's currency instability and the resulting social unrest.

Following the 2026 Iran war and the ceasefire of 8 April 2026, the United States maintained a naval blockade on Iran as part of "Operation Economic Fury", redirecting commercial vessels and seeking to further choke off Iranian oil exports while negotiations continued. On 22 June 2026, the US Treasury issued a 60-day waiver on all existing US sanctions on the production, delivery, and sale of Iranian crude oil, petrochemical products, and petroleum products, valid through 21 August 2026, as part of the MoU signed on 17 June 2026. The waiver also permitted the United States to import Iranian crude oil and petroleum products for domestic use.

== United Nations sanctions ==
The United Nations Security Council adopted a series of resolutions imposing sanctions on Iran after the International Atomic Energy Agency (IAEA) Board of Governors found that Iran had failed to comply with its safeguards obligations under the Treaty on the Non-Proliferation of Nuclear Weapons (NPT). The sanctions were imposed following Iran's refusal to suspend uranium enrichment and related activities, as required by Security Council resolutions beginning with Resolution 1696 (2006).

=== Security Council resolutions ===
- United Nations Security Council Resolution 1696 (31 July 2006) demanded that Iran suspend all enrichment-related and reprocessing activities and threatened sanctions in the event of non-compliance.
- United Nations Security Council Resolution 1737 (23 December 2006) made it mandatory for Iran to suspend enrichment and reprocessing activities, imposed sanctions banning the supply of nuclear-related materials and technology, and froze the assets of key individuals and companies related to the programme.
- United Nations Security Council Resolution 1747 (24 March 2007) imposed an arms embargo and expanded asset freezes.
- United Nations Security Council Resolution 1803 (3 March 2008) extended asset freezes and called upon states to monitor Iranian banks, inspect Iranian ships and aircraft, and monitor the movement of individuals involved with the programme.
- United Nations Security Council Resolution 1929 (9 June 2010) banned Iran from participating in activities related to ballistic missiles, tightened the arms embargo, and froze the funds and assets of the IRGC and Islamic Republic of Iran Shipping Lines.
- United Nations Security Council Resolution 2231 (20 July 2015) established a schedule for suspending and eventually lifting UN sanctions, with provisions to reimpose them in the event of Iranian non-compliance, in accordance with the JCPOA.

=== The Joint Comprehensive Plan of Action (2015) ===
On 2 April 2015, the P5+1 and Iran reached a provisional framework agreement in Lausanne, Switzerland. The final agreement, the Joint Comprehensive Plan of Action (JCPOA), was adopted on 18 October 2015. Under the JCPOA, Iran agreed to limit uranium enrichment to a maximum purity of 3.67 per cent, cap its enriched uranium stockpile at 300 kg for 15 years, and accept enhanced IAEA monitoring, in exchange for the lifting of most UN and multilateral sanctions. UN sanctions were lifted on 16 January 2016.

Sanctions relief affected Iran's economy in four principal ways: the release of approximately $29 billion in frozen assets; the removal of sanctions on Iranian oil exports; permission for foreign firms to invest in Iran's oil and gas and other sectors; and Iran's restored access to the global banking system, including SWIFT.

=== US snapback attempt, 2020 ===
On 14 August 2020, the UN Security Council rejected a US-proposed resolution to extend the global arms embargo on Iran, with only the Dominican Republic supporting the United States. Eleven members abstained, while Russia and China voted against. The UN arms embargo expired on 18 October 2020 as provided by the JCPOA.

=== Restoration of sanctions (E3 snapback mechanism, 2025) ===
In July 2025, the E3 (France, Germany, and the United Kingdom) warned that the snapback mechanism would be triggered if no satisfactory progress was made in nuclear negotiations by the end of August 2025. On 28 August 2025, the E3 formally initiated the snapback process, citing Iran's accumulation of a highly enriched uranium stockpile that, in their assessment, "lacks any credible civilian justification and is unprecedented for a state without a nuclear weapons program". Iran's Foreign Minister Abbas Araghchi declared the activation "unjustified, illegal, and lacking any legal basis".

On 28 September 2025, UN sanctions were officially reimposed on Iran following expiry of the 30-day window. China and Russia rejected the snapback as legally invalid. The United Nations, having rejected the Russian-Chinese counter-resolutions, confirmed the legal and juridical validity of the snapback in accordance with United Nations Security Council Resolution 2231 and the reactivation of international sanctions according to prior UN Security Council resolutions. The UN Secretariat has officially reactivated the sanctions committee and its website, but Russia and China continue to block the committee's work, creating a vacuum in implementation and oversight of sanctions.

== European Union sanctions ==
=== Nuclear-related sanctions ===
On 23 January 2012, the Council of the EU announced an embargo on Iranian oil exports, effective July 2012, and a freeze on assets held by the Central Bank of Iran, with restrictions also placed on trading of precious metals and petrochemicals with Iran. These measures were described by European officials as the toughest sanctions the EU had imposed against any country.

Following the US withdrawal from the JCPOA in 2018, the EU enacted an updated blocking statute on 7 August 2018 to nullify US secondary sanctions on entities trading with Iran.

In September 2023, the E3 announced they would retain certain JCPOA-era sanctions scheduled to expire, in order to deter Tehran from selling drones and missiles to Russia.

In May 2024, the EU expanded its sanctions regime to ban the sale of missile components, in addition to the ban on unmanned aerial vehicle components adopted in July 2023, targeting Iran's military support for Russia's war against Ukraine.

=== Human rights-related sanctions ===
On 12 April 2021, the EU sanctioned eight Iranian militia commanders and security officials over human rights abuses, the first such sanctions since 2013.

In April 2025, the EU imposed sanctions on seven Iranian prison and judicial officials and two institutions in response to a campaign of detaining EU nationals, targeting figures including the head of Tehran's Evin Prison.

In March 2026, the EU approved new sanctions against 19 Iranian officials and entities following human rights violations related to the suppression of Iranian protesters. The EU also imposed sanctions on the Iranian company Emennet Pasargad over cyber-attacks against European countries.

=== SWIFT disconnection ===
On 17 March 2012, the SWIFT electronic banking network disconnected all Iranian banks identified as being in breach of EU sanctions from its international network. Iranian banks were reconnected to SWIFT in February 2016 following JCPOA implementation, but were subsequently disconnected again in November 2018 after the US reimposed sanctions.

== United Kingdom sanctions ==
In July 2023, British Foreign Secretary James Cleverly announced a new UK sanctions regime for Iran, expanding the United Kingdom's powers to sanction Iranian decision-makers involved in weapons proliferation.

In February 2026, in response to the 2026 Iran massacres, the British government sanctioned ten Iranian officials, including police chiefs and IRGC members, as well as the Police Command of the Islamic Republic of Iran (FARAJA), for their role in suppressing Iranian protesters. The UK condemned the Iranian counter-strikes following the 28 February 2026 US-Israeli attacks, called for a resumption of diplomacy, and deployed aircraft and naval assets in a defensive role in the region, though it did not participate militarily in the initial strikes.

== Australian and other national sanctions ==
In February 2026, the Australian government imposed sanctions on twenty Iranian individuals and three organisations in response to the Iranian government's violent suppression of protesters during the 2026 Iran massacres.

Canada imposed a ban on dealings in the property of designated Iranian nationals, a complete arms embargo, and restrictions on oil-refining equipment, investment in the Iranian oil and gas sector, and the provision of ships or services to Islamic Republic of Iran Shipping Lines.

Following the 2026 Iran massacres, Ukraine designated the IRGC as a terrorist organisation on 2 February 2026, citing the crackdown on protesters and Iranian supply of Shahed drones to Russia.

== FATF blacklisting ==
On 21 February 2020, Iran was placed on the Financial Action Task Force (FATF) blacklist. On 25 October 2024, the FATF again placed Iran on its blacklist, alongside Myanmar and North Korea, due to Iran's failure to enact laws preventing money laundering and the financing of terrorism through its support for the Axis of Resistance.

== The 2026 Iran war and sanctions diplomacy ==
=== Background: protests, massacres, and military buildup ===
The 2025-2026 Iranian protests erupted on 28 December 2025 following sharp depreciation of the Iranian rial and rising inflation exacerbated by reimposed international sanctions. The protests, the largest since the Iranian Revolution, were met with severe repression during the 2026 Iran massacres, in which thousands of civilians were killed by government forces. In January 2026, the internet was shut down across Iran for more than two weeks following the outbreak of protests.

The United States began bolstering its military presence in the region and President Trump publicly encouraged Iranian protesters, stating that help was "on the way".

=== February 2026 negotiations and military strikes ===
On 6 February 2026, the United States and Iran began indirect nuclear negotiations in Geneva, mediated by Oman, aimed at reaching a deal to curb Iran's nuclear programme. Three rounds of talks were held through 26 February 2026. The mediating Omani foreign minister stated that significant progress had been made and that Iran had agreed to degrade its nuclear stockpiles to the lowest level possible, including an effective commitment to never acquire nuclear material capable of producing a bomb. President Trump said he was "not thrilled" with the progress of the talks.

On 28 February 2026, less than two days after the conclusion of the third round of nuclear talks, the United States and Israel launched coordinated military strikes against Iran, targeting nuclear facilities, military infrastructure, and regime leadership. The strikes killed Supreme Leader Ali Khamenei and several other senior Iranian officials. President Trump stated that the United States had begun "major combat operations" aimed at eliminating threats from the Iranian regime. Iran appointed Khamenei's son as his successor and launched retaliatory missile and drone strikes against Israel, US military bases in Bahrain, Qatar, Kuwait, the UAE, and Saudi Arabia, and closed the Strait of Hormuz to commercial shipping. The closure of the strait, through which nearly one-fifth of the world's oil and natural gas supply passes, caused a major global energy supply disruption.

A ceasefire took effect on 8 April 2026. On 21 June 2026, following renewed tensions, the US conducted additional strikes on the Fordow, Natanz, and Isfahan nuclear facilities in Iran. Trump declared a fresh ceasefire on 24 June 2026.

=== June 2026 MoU and sanctions relief ===
On 14 June 2026, US and Iranian officials reached a preliminary ceasefire and sanctions framework. Pakistani Prime Minister Shehbaz Sharif, who had served as a mediator, announced on 15 June that a formal agreement would be signed in Switzerland. The memorandum of understanding (MoU) was signed on 17 June 2026 in Switzerland.

The MoU established a 60-day framework, extendable by mutual consent, covering the following elements:

- The Strait of Hormuz would remain open with no tolls and Iran would clear mines it had deployed in the strait.
- The United States would lift its naval blockade on Iranian ports and issue sanctions waivers to allow Iran to sell oil freely.
- Iran reaffirmed it would not procure or develop nuclear weapons, and both sides agreed to negotiate the disposition of Iran's enriched uranium stockpile.
- Iran agreed to maintain the current status quo of its nuclear programme while the United States agreed not to impose new sanctions or deploy additional forces.
- The United States committed to ending all sanctions facing Iran, including UN Security Council resolutions and all unilateral US sanctions, on an "agreed-upon schedule" as part of a final agreement.
- Regional partners and the United States committed to developing a plan allocating at least $300 billion toward rebuilding Iran's damaged economy, with the implementation mechanism to be established in the final deal.
- Until sanctions are terminated, the US Treasury would issue waivers for exporting Iranian crude oil, petroleum products, and associated services including banking, transportation, and insurance.

On 22 June 2026, the US Treasury confirmed a 60-day waiver on all existing US sanctions on the production, delivery, and sale of Iranian crude oil, petrochemical products, and petroleum products, valid through 21 August 2026. The waiver enabled Iran to sell oil at full market rates rather than at a discount, representing, in the assessment of analysts and US officials, a significant economic concession. Vice President JD Vance stated that the US and Iran had made "a lot of great progress", and identified four accomplishments: permitting IAEA nuclear inspections, building a mechanism to reopen the Strait of Hormuz, establishing a regional ceasefire deconfliction mechanism in Lebanon, and setting up a process for future negotiations.

Four working groups were established following technical talks in Switzerland: sanctions termination; nuclear affairs; reconstruction and economic development; and monitoring and implementation of agreements reached.

=== Outstanding issues ===
As of late June 2026, several major issues remained unresolved in negotiations. The United States maintained that Iran must conduct "zero enrichment" of uranium, a demand Iran had previously rejected. The fate of Iran's existing stockpile of highly enriched uranium, which the IAEA verified in early June 2025 as exceeding 400 kg enriched to 60 per cent purity, remained a central issue. The question of frozen Iranian assets, estimated at approximately $100 billion, was also contested: Iran sought immediate full release, while the US maintained that release would only occur upon verified implementation of a final agreement.

Iran's foreign ministry spokesman stated that Tehran did not negotiate on its nuclear programme during the initial round of Switzerland talks and had not accepted new commitments, while the US claimed Iran had agreed to allow IAEA inspections to resume. Iran denied confirming that agreement. The status of Iran's ballistic missile programme, the lifting of all US secondary and unilateral sanctions, war reparations, and regional security arrangements, including Lebanon and Iran-backed armed groups, remained additional sticking points.

== Economic effects ==
=== Oil exports and revenues ===
Sanctions substantially reduced Iran's oil export revenues. The International Energy Agency estimated that Iranian oil exports fell to 860,000 barrels per day in September 2012, down from 2.2 million barrels per day at the end of 2011. According to Undersecretary of State William J. Burns, Iran was losing as much as $60 billion annually in energy investment as a direct result of sanctions.

After the US naval blockade was lifted in June 2026, Iran was able to export over 80 million barrels of crude oil that had been effectively trapped in storage during the period of maritime restrictions. The revenue from these exports allowed Tehran to replenish its reserves of essential commodities, including wheat, medical supplies, cooking oil, and protein-based foodstuffs. Despite the resumption of Iranian oil exports, the broader global economy continued to face disruptions in moving normal commercial traffic through the Strait of Hormuz, a critical chokepoint for international energy shipments.

=== Currency and inflation ===
The value of the Iranian rial declined sharply from autumn 2011, falling by up to 80 per cent in some periods, causing widespread panic among the Iranian public and prompting the government to raise interest rates. The Central Bank of Iran estimated an inflation rate of approximately 27 per cent in January 2013, while economists believed the actual rate was significantly higher. Iran's currency entered a new freefall in late 2025, prompting the large-scale protests of December 2025 and early 2026. By the time of the 2026 war, US officials stated that Iran's foreign reserves were near zero and annual inflation was running at nearly 70 per cent.

=== Broader economic impacts ===
Research found that sanctions resulted in welfare losses across all income groups in Iran, with wealthier groups experiencing larger absolute losses. Iran's GDP contracted by about 3 per cent in 2012 and a further 1.2 per cent in 2013, according to the Economist Intelligence Unit. Automobile production fell approximately 40 per cent from 2011 levels. The United Nations Special Rapporteur Idriss Jazairy stated that the reimposition of US sanctions after the 2018 withdrawal was destroying Iran's economy and driving millions into poverty.

Analysis published by S&P Global concluded that broad US sanctions had contributed to the consolidation of power in Iran rather than weakening the regime, as state enterprises and government-connected companies gained commercial advantage through political access to sanctions circumvention networks.

The 2026 war further devastated Iran's economy. The closure of the Strait of Hormuz caused the largest supply disruption of the global oil market on record, affected the natural gas, fertiliser, aviation, and tourism industries globally, and caused severe volatility in financial markets.

== Humanitarian impact ==
Pharmaceuticals and medical equipment are formally exempt from international sanctions, but Iran has faced shortages of drugs for the treatment of numerous illnesses, because exclusion from international payment systems prevented purchasing even technically permitted goods. Drug imports from the US and Europe decreased by approximately 30 per cent in 2012. In 2013, approximately 85,000 cancer patients required chemotherapy that had become scarce, while some 40,000 haemophiliacs could not obtain blood-clotting medicines and 23,000 Iranians with HIV/AIDS had severely restricted access to needed medications.

In 2020, China, the United Kingdom, and others pressed the United States to ease sanctions to help Iran fight COVID-19. Human Rights Watch urged the United States to ease sanctions to ensure access to essential humanitarian resources during the pandemic.

The 2026 war added new humanitarian dimensions. US-Israeli strikes damaged at least 120 museums and historical sites and killed more than 1,900 people in strikes on Iran by June 2026. The Office of the United Nations High Commissioner for Human Rights stressed that sanctions must not harm the human rights of ordinary citizens, and the UN Secretary-General condemned the US-Israeli strikes.

== Sanctions evasion ==
=== Shadow fleet ===
Iran developed extensive mechanisms to circumvent sanctions, including through a network of vessels known as the shadow fleet, which conceals its activities through falsified tracking data, vessel renaming, and flag-of-convenience registrations. In October 2025, Reuters exposed the involvement of the Maritime Mutual Insurance Association (MMIA), a New Zealand-based company, in providing insurance to vessels evading Western sanctions on both Iranian and Russian oil. Of 231 tankers identified as insured by Maritime Mutual, 130 were found to have carried sanctioned cargo, transporting an estimated $18.2 billion of Iranian oil and $16.7 billion of Russian energy products. New Zealand authorities subsequently investigated Maritime Mutual for potential money laundering and terrorism financing violations.

=== Shadow banking networks ===
According to the US Treasury, sanctioned Iranian banks conduct international trade through private management companies, known in Persian as rahbar companies, which administer portfolios of thousands of overseas shell companies and bank accounts. In an April 2026 action, the Treasury stated that such networks operated on behalf of Bank Melli, Shahr Bank, Bank Sepah, the National Iranian Oil Company, the Armed Forces General Staff and the Islamic Revolutionary Guard Corps (IRGC), and that Bank Melli's network alone processed billions of dollars for the oil company, the Central Bank of Iran and the IRGC.

In this arrangement, an Iranian institution issues a payment instruction, an exchange house or rahbar company arranges for an overseas purchaser to pay one of its foreign shell companies, and the resulting balance is used abroad to pay a supplier, purchase shipping services or settle another Iranian importer's obligation, rather than being repatriated to Iran.

A Treasury action of 7 August 2026 identified components of such a network operating during 2026. It stated that Titan Exchange, a Dubai exchange house, acted as a front for Shahr Bank and held tens of millions of dollars on its behalf in early 2026, and that another Dubai firm, Alps International, generated invoices on the letterhead of selected shell companies and coordinated payments through Chinese shell-company accounts, enabling hundreds of millions of dollars of transactions in several currencies. All of the entities named were designated on the same date.

=== Exposure of the United States financial system ===
An October 2025 analysis by the Financial Crimes Enforcement Network (FinCEN) of Bank Secrecy Act filings found that US financial institutions had reported approximately $9 billion of 2024 activity as potentially related to Iranian shadow banking, across 2,027 transactions of at least $500,000. Shell companies accounted for about $5 billion and Iran-linked oil companies for about $4 billion, with smaller amounts attributed to shipping companies ($707 million), investment companies ($665 million) and possible procurement companies ($413 million). Companies based in Dubai were associated with $6.4 billion and companies based in Hong Kong with $4.8 billion; the report stated that Hong Kong shell companies had sent billions of dollars to companies in the United Arab Emirates through US correspondent accounts. FinCEN cautioned that suspicious activity reports may cover attempted as well as completed transfers and do not constitute a net measure of illicit flows.

On 28 August 2026, FinCEN proposed a rule under Section 311 of the USA PATRIOT Act that would prohibit US financial institutions from maintaining correspondent accounts for the UAE operations of the Egyptian bank Banque Misr. The Treasury estimated that the bank had processed about $1.8 billion between January 2024 and June 2026 for 103 companies it said might form part of Iranian shadow-banking networks, and alleged that its customers included front companies used by Iran's Ministry of Defence and the IRGC. As of September 2026, the measure remained a proposal subject to public comment and no sanctions had been imposed on the bank.

=== Cryptocurrency and stablecoins ===
Iranian institutions have used Tether (USDT), a stablecoin intended to hold a value of about one US dollar, to settle cross-border obligations without each transaction passing through a US bank. In January 2026 the blockchain analytics firm Elliptic reported that it had attributed to the Central Bank of Iran a network of wallets that acquired at least $507 million in USDT, describing the figure as a lower bound. According to Elliptic, documents indicated purchases in April and May 2025 paid for in Emirati dirhams. Most of the tokens were then transferred to Nobitex, Iran's largest cryptocurrency exchange, after which flows moved through cross-chain bridges and decentralised exchanges. In June 2026 the Treasury designated Nobitex, stating that the exchange had helped the Central Bank of Iran obtain hundreds of millions of dollars in stablecoins, had given regime-linked individuals access to international exchanges, and had moved and protected regime assets during wartime internet shutdowns.

Also, in January 2026, the blockchain intelligence firm TRM Labs attributed about $1.05 billion in flows between 2023 and 2025 to the IRGC through Zedcex and Zedxion, two companies registered in the United Kingdom that TRM said operated as a single exchange while maintaining dormant accounts, virtual office addresses and nominal directors. Activity attributed to the IRGC rose from about $23.7 million in 2023 to $619.1 million in 2024 before falling to $410.4 million in 2025, mostly in USDT on the Tron blockchain. The Washington Post reported the findings and noted that the exchanges and individuals linked to them disputed or did not respond to aspects of the attribution.

Stablecoin use has also created points of leverage for enforcement, because the issuer retains administrative control over the token. In April 2026, Tether stated that it had frozen more than $344 million held at two addresses in coordination with the Office of Foreign Assets Control (OFAC) and US law enforcement; TRM Labs described the addresses as central-bank reserve infrastructure that OFAC linked to the IRGC-Quds Force and Hezbollah, and said most of the balances had been dormant since late 2023.

Further designations followed. On 7 August 2026 the Treasury designated Shelbit, a Georgia-based exchange network with companies in the UAE and Poland, after identifying transfers in both directions with IRGC-controlled addresses, and Aban Tether, an Iran-based exchange that it said had processed transactions involving Nobitex, Wallex, Bitpin and Ramzinex. Separately, The Wall Street Journal reported in February 2026 that investigators at the cryptocurrency exchange Binance had found that a Hong Kong payments company, Blessed Trust, moved more than $1 billion in Tether between November 2024 and August 2025 to a network they associated with an IRGC-operated Hong Kong–Tehran corridor. Binance said it had closed the account and cooperated with law enforcement.

=== Oil allocations to military bodies ===
FinCEN reported in June 2025 that Iran's budget allocated oil in kind to the Ministry of Defence, the Armed Forces General Staff and the IRGC-Quds Force for sale abroad. Citing Iranian budget estimates, it put military oil allocations at more than $10 billion a year and about 500,000 barrels per day, and stated that by the end of 2025 more than half of total oil proceeds were expected to be allocated to the armed forces. The same advisory described the concealment methods used in these sales, including ageing tankers held through layered ownership structures, ship-to-ship transfers, manipulation of automatic identification system signals, repeated reflagging, falsified cargo documentation and the relabelling of Iranian crude as a "Malaysian blend". At that time Iran was exporting roughly 1.6 million barrels per day, almost entirely to China.

Seaborne exports fell sharply after the reimposition of the US naval blockade on 14 July 2026. Reuters reported on 1 September 2026 that no significant Iranian crude cargo had passed through the Strait of Hormuz to China for about seven weeks, and that loadings had fallen to between 220,000 and 255,000 barrels per day in August, compared with about 2 million barrels per day in March 2026. Volumes already stored afloat in Asia could still be sold, but could not be replenished at previous rates.

=== Trade networks and front companies ===
Iran used front companies and third-country intermediaries to access goods and technologies subject to sanctions, as well as barter trade to circumvent financial transaction restrictions. China became Iran's largest remaining trading partner, absorbing displaced oil exports and providing manufactured goods. In July 2022, Iran and Gazprom signed a memorandum of understanding worth approximately $40 billion, supporting the development of Iranian gas fields.

=== "Resistance economy" ===
Iran adopted what it termed a "resistance economy", replacing imports with domestically produced goods and banning luxury imports. Some analysts noted that the reliance on smuggling to supply goods paradoxically strengthened government-connected enterprises and weakened civil society.

== Effectiveness and debates ==
Academic and policy assessments of the effectiveness of sanctions against Iran are divided. Proponents argue that sustained international pressure contributed to bringing Iran to the negotiating table for the JCPOA in 2015. Iranian Foreign Minister Ali Akbar Salehi acknowledged in 2011 that sanctions were having an impact.

Critics contend that sanctions proved counterproductive over the long term, consolidating rather than weakening the Iranian state and disproportionately harming the civilian population. Analysis by S&P Global found that broad US sanctions had tightened the regime's grip on the economy rather than loosening it. Gallup polling in 2013 found that Iranians attributed economic hardship primarily to the United States rather than to their own government, suggesting limits to the political leverage of economic pressure.

The 2026 war represented a fundamental departure from the sanctions-centred approach to Iranian policy, though the resulting MoU incorporated sanctions relief as a central incentive. Critics, including legal scholars and international relations experts, described the US attacks as illegal under US law and a violation of Iranian sovereignty. The Union of Concerned Scientists and others noted the longstanding US-Israeli double standard on nuclear non-proliferation in the Middle East.

== Frozen assets ==
After the Iranian Revolution in 1979, the United States froze approximately $11 billion in Iranian assets (in 1980 dollars). Between 2008 and 2013, further billions of dollars of Iranian assets abroad were seized or frozen in multiple countries. The chairman of the Iranian Majlis Planning and Budget Committee stated that $100 billion of Iranian funds had been frozen in foreign banks as a result of sanctions.

The June 2026 MoU committed the United States to making frozen Iranian assets "fully available for use" with the mechanism to be established in the final deal. Iran's top negotiator called for half of the estimated $25 billion in frozen assets to be released at MoU signing, with the other half released within sixty days, a position the United States did not accept in the initial agreement.

== Legal challenges ==
The European Union's General Court annulled EU sanctions against two of Iran's largest banks, Bank Saderat and Bank Mellat, after both institutions successfully challenged the restrictive measures on procedural and evidentiary grounds.

Critics, including legal scholars, described the February 2026 US-Israeli strikes on Iran as illegal under both US and international law, executed without congressional authorisation and in violation of the UN Charter. The UN Secretary-General and several countries condemned the strikes, though the UN Security Council subsequently passed a resolution condemning Iran's retaliatory strikes on Gulf states.

== See also ==
- Economic D-Day
- Foreign relations of Iran
- Iran-Contra affair
- Nuclear program of Iran
- 2026 Iran war
- 2025–2026 Iran–United States negotiations
- Joint Comprehensive Plan of Action
- List of parties to the Nuclear Non-Proliferation Treaty
- Resistance economy
- United States embargoes
