= List of prizes, medals, and awards in Singapore =

This is a list of prizes, medals and awards including cups, trophies, bowls, badges, state decorations etc., awarded in Singapore.

== National honours, military and patriotic medals ==
- National Day Awards: Singaporean orders and decorations
- Awards and decorations of the Singapore Armed Forces
- Awards and decorations of the Singapore Police Force

== Science, mathematics, technology ==
- Defence Science Award
- President's Science and Technology Awards
- Tan Kah Kee Young Inventors' Award
- ThinkQuest Junior Awards (defunct from 2013)
- Singapore Computer Society IT Leader Awards

== Arts, heritage and entertainment ==
=== Art ===
- Cultural Medallion
- DBS Life! Theatre Awards
- National Arts Education Award
- Patron of the Arts Award
- Young Artist Award

=== Heritage ===
- Patron of Heritage Awards

=== Beauty ===
- Miss Singapore Chinatown
- Miss Singapore Universe
- Miss World (Singapore)

=== Film ===
- Silver Screen Awards
- Singapore Short Film Awards

=== Journalism ===
- ACCA Singapore Environmental and Social Reporting Awards

=== Literature ===
- Golden Point Award
- Singapore Chinese Literature Award
- Singapore Literature Prize
- Singapore Student Literary Award

=== Music ===
- Singapore Hit Awards

=== Radio ===
- Singapore Radio Awards

=== Television ===
- Star Awards

== Architecture and construction ==
- Asia Responsible Corporate Awards
- BEI Asia Awards
- Construction Excellence Awards
- SIA-ICI Colour Dulux Award
- URA Architectural Heritage Award

== Business and management ==
- Enterprise 50 Awards - established in 1995, recognises local, privately held companies who have contributed to economic development in Singapore and abroad.
- Singapore Enterprise Medal of Honour -By Singapore Enterprise Association (SEA)
- British Chamber of Commerce Annual Business Awards - 8 categories across industries, and special recognition for Small businesses
- Top Entrepreneur Awards
- Asia Pacific Entrepreneurship Awards
- Ernst & Young Entrepreneur of the Year Award
- One Asia Awards
- Asia Responsible Entrepreneurship Awards
- International Management Action Award
- The NORNS Awards - Excellence and Innovation Worldwide.
- National Innovation and Quality Circles Award
- People Excellence Award
- Singapore Brand Award
- Rotary ASME Entrepreneur of the Year Award
- Singapore Business Awards
  - Businessman of the Year Award
  - Enterprise Award
  - Outstanding Chief Executive Award
- Singapore Innovation Award
- Singapore Quality Award for Business Excellence
- Singapore Tourism Award

== Education ==
- National Arts Education Award
- National Young Leader Award
- Outstanding Youth in Education Award
- Special Academic Awards
  - Prime Minister's Book Prize
  - Lee Kuan Yew Award for Mathematics and Science
  - Lee Kuan Yew Scholarship to Encourage Upgrading (LKY-STEP Award)
- Masterplan of Awards
  - School Excellence Award
  - School Distinction Award
  - Best Practice Award
  - Sustained Achievement Award
  - Lee Kuan Yew National Education Award
  - Outstanding Development Award
  - Top 25 in school award
  - Academic achievement
  - Edusave Merit Bursary

== Humanitarianism ==
- President's Social Service Award

== Sports and Games ==
- Singapore Sports Awards

== General achievement ==
- Excellent Service Award (EXSA), a national award that recognises individuals who have delivered outstanding service. It seeks to develop service models for staff to emulate, create service champions and professionalise services, managed by SPRING Singapore
