= Behshahr =

City in Mazandaran province, Iran

Behshahr بهشهر Ashraf or Ashraf-ol-Belād
- City
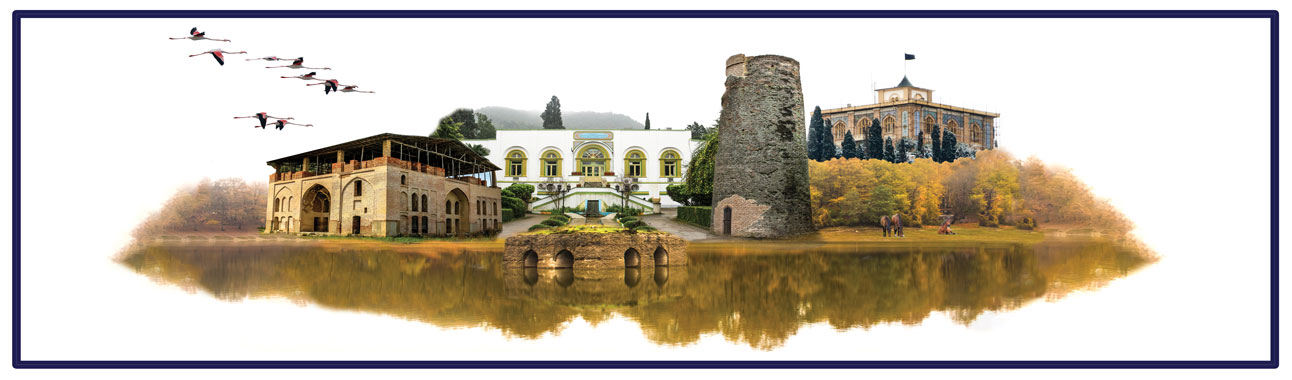
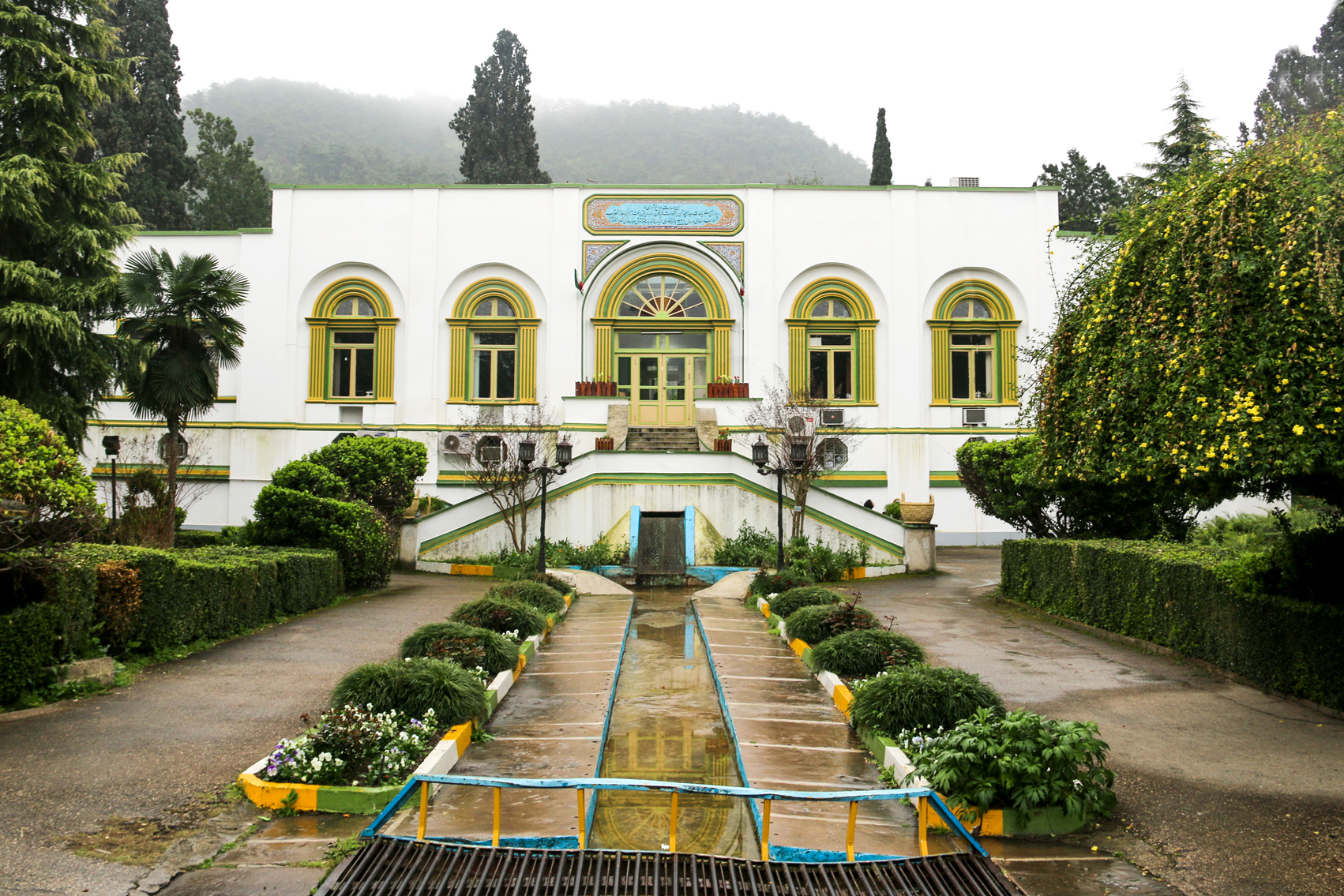
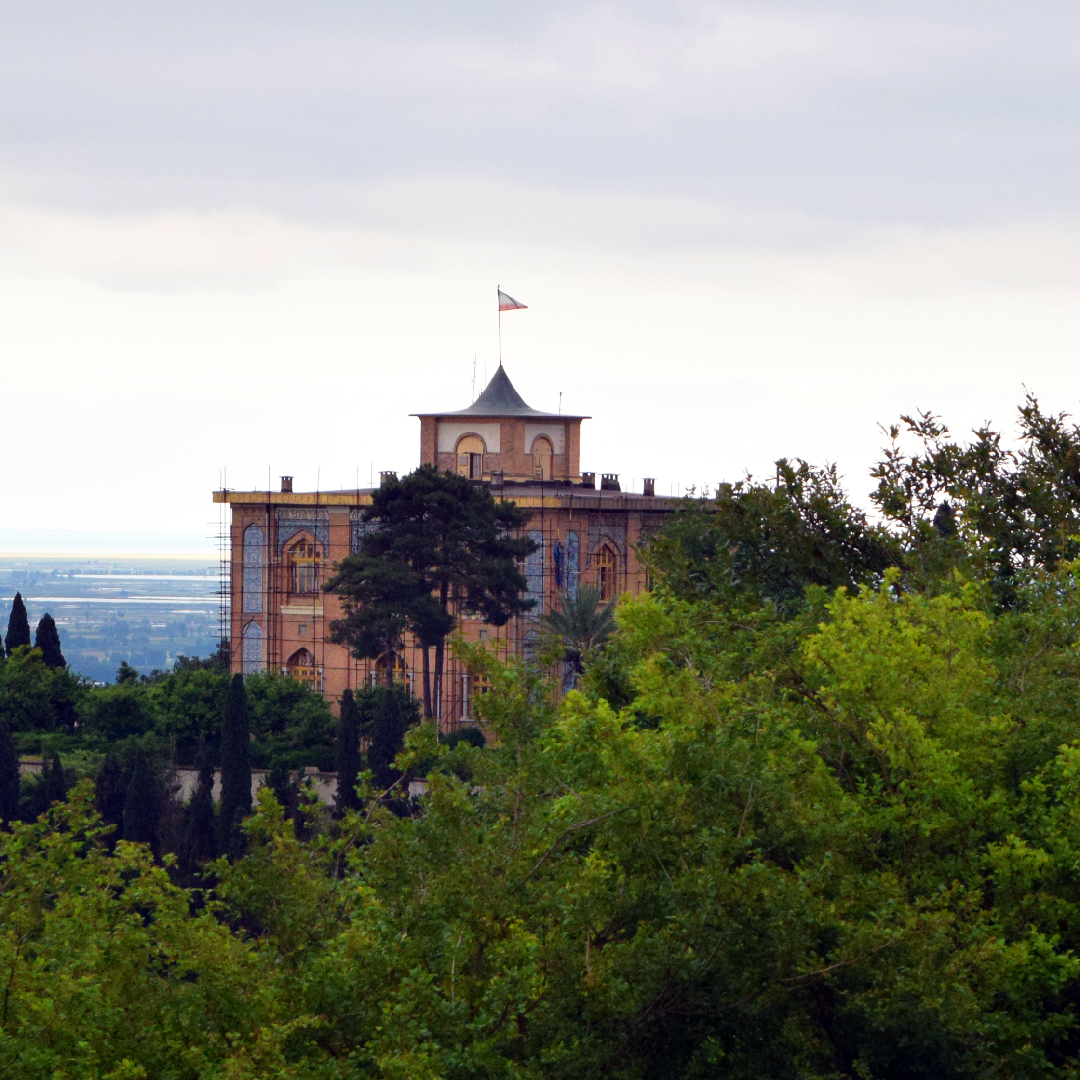
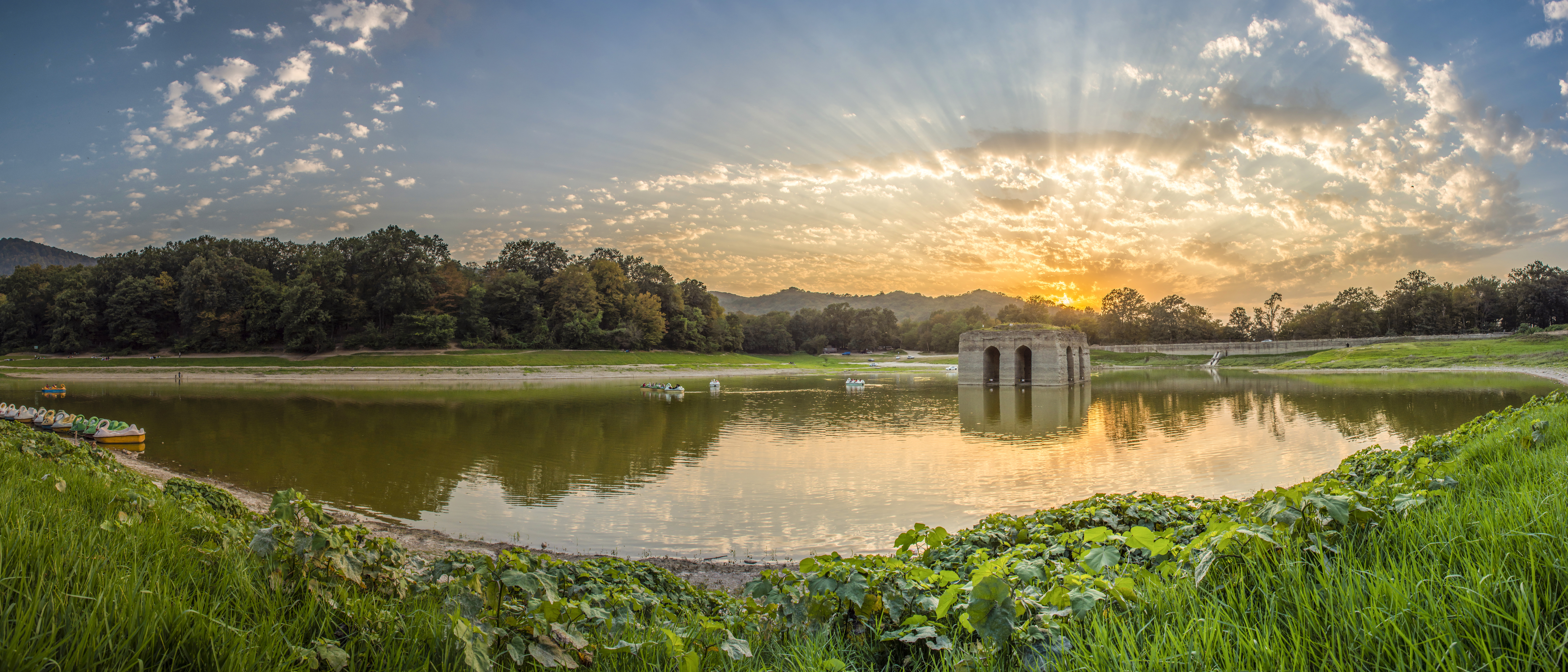
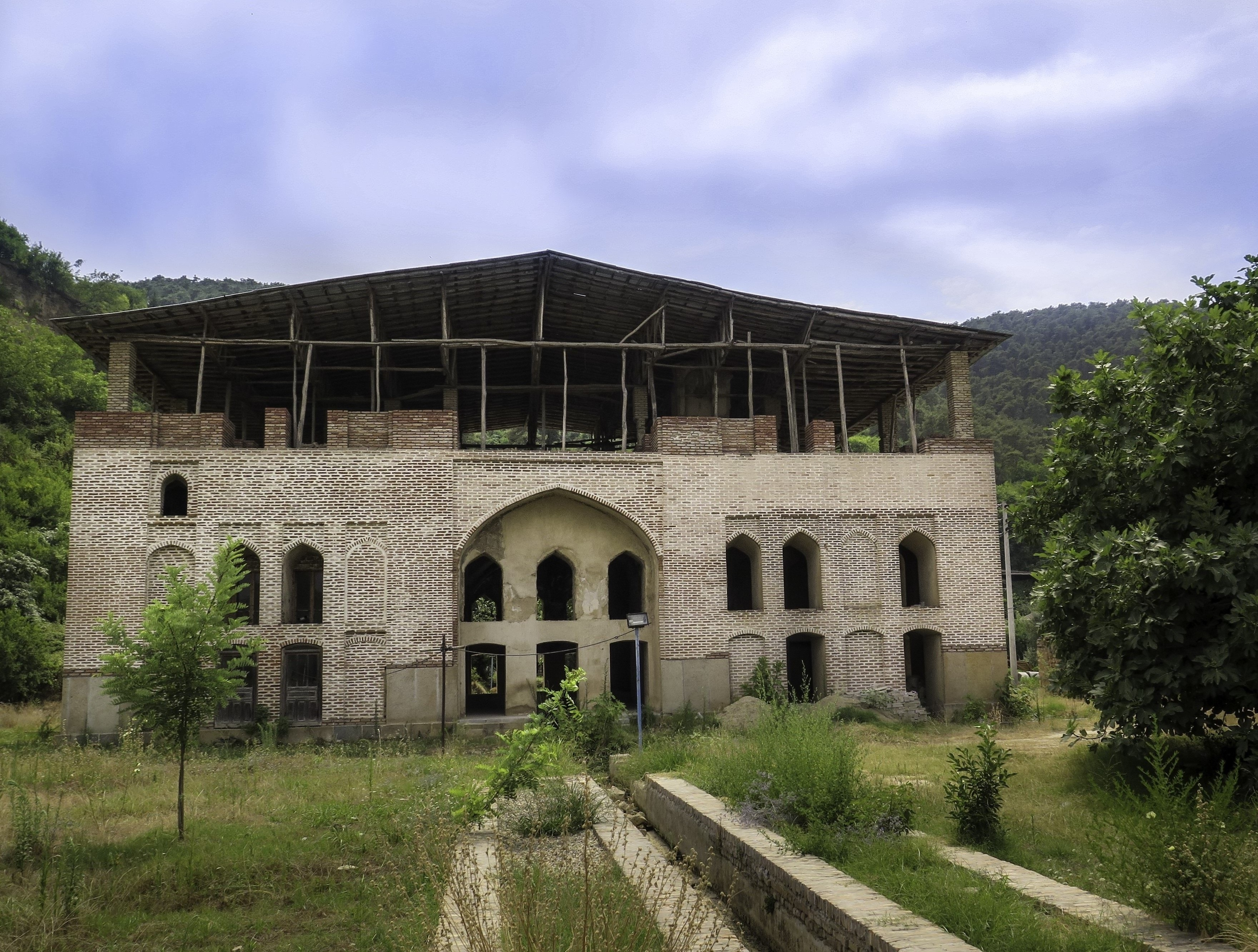
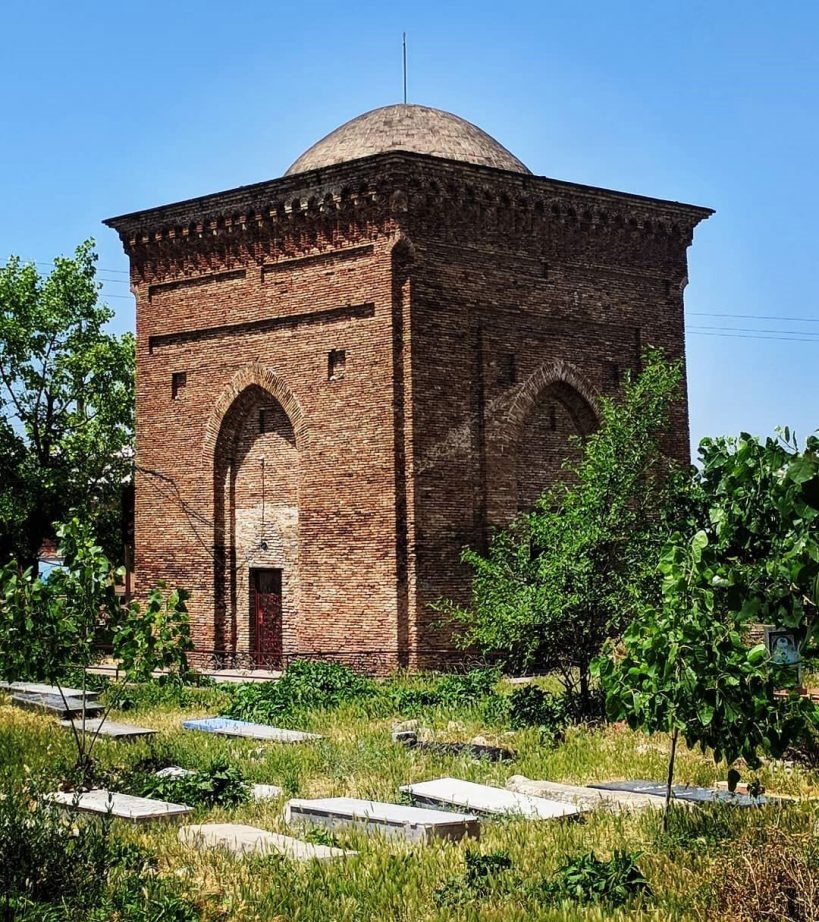

- Location within Iran
- Coordinates: 36°41′37″N 53°33′11″E
- Country: Iran
- Province: Mazandaran
- County: Behshahr
- District: Central
- Established: 1906

Government
  - Mayor: Yaser Ahmadi
  - City Council: Chairman: Abbas Asgaria

Population (2016)
  - Total: 94,702
- Time zone: UTC+3:30 (IRST)

Behshahr (Persian: بِهْشَهْر) (Note: Also romanized as Behšahr; Mazanderani: بِهْشَهْر, romanized as Behšahr) is a city in the Central District of Behshahr County, Mazandaran province, Iran, serving as capital of both the county and the district. One of the oldest cities in Iran, it is at the foot of the Alborz mountains, approximately 40 kilometres (25 mi) east of Sari and 80 kilometres (50 mi) west of Gorgan.

== History ==
In 17th century AD, the Safavid Shah, Abbas the Great, chose Ashraf to build palaces and gardens because of his devotion to his mother, who was born in Ashraf. The palace was named DiwanKhaneh mansion (Persian: عمارت دیوانخانه) and was visited by Pietro Della Valle. In his travelogue he wrote:

This garden, which is called Bagh-e Shah or Diwankhaneh, includes a square located at the end of the plain and at the foot of the hills full of trees and behind the palace. It is on the top of these hills that the king ordered to build many houses which are considered as garden mansions. Diwankhaneh is located in the middle of the garden and its length is three times its width. The front of this building is completely open, but at the back and on the sides has a wall covered with many windows. The floor of the building is two steps above the ground level, and the open part of the building faces north, that is, the back to the entrance door. There is a long paved street in front of the building, in the middle of which there is a stream, and water is constantly flowing towards this stream from the pond built in front of Diwankhanah.

Several other mansions and gardens were built on the outskirts of the Bagh-e Shah during the Safavid era such as Baghtappeh (tappeh garden), Cheshme Garden, Shamal Garden, Sahib Al-Zaman Garden, Haramsara Garden, and Khalut Garden, of which only Cheshme garden and parts of Baghtappeh have remained.

In 1832 David Brewster wrote in The Edinburgh Encyclopædia that "Ashraff is celebrated as the favourite residence of Shah Abbas, and enjoys the only good harbour on the southern side of the Caspian".

Prior to the arrival of Shah Abbas I Ashraf was a village of no distinction. The location took the fancy of Abbas I who made it an imperial residence in 1613, when he commissioned the construction of a palace and gardens. The heyday of the town was from that time until the middle of the 18th century. By the time that Sir Thomas Herbert visited the palace in 1628 there were about 2,000 families living in the town, and at least 300 public bath houses. However the town was the scene of both internal disorder and external threats (it was repeatedly sacked by Turkomans), so although it was still a significant town in 1727 when the Ottoman–Persian War (1722–1727) concluded, the town was gradually abandoned. Jonas Hanway visited the town in 1744 when it was in a state of decay, and by 1812 when Sir William Ouseley visited the palace was in ruins. By 1860 Ashraf was no more than a large village of 845 houses with between eight and ten thousand inhabitants.

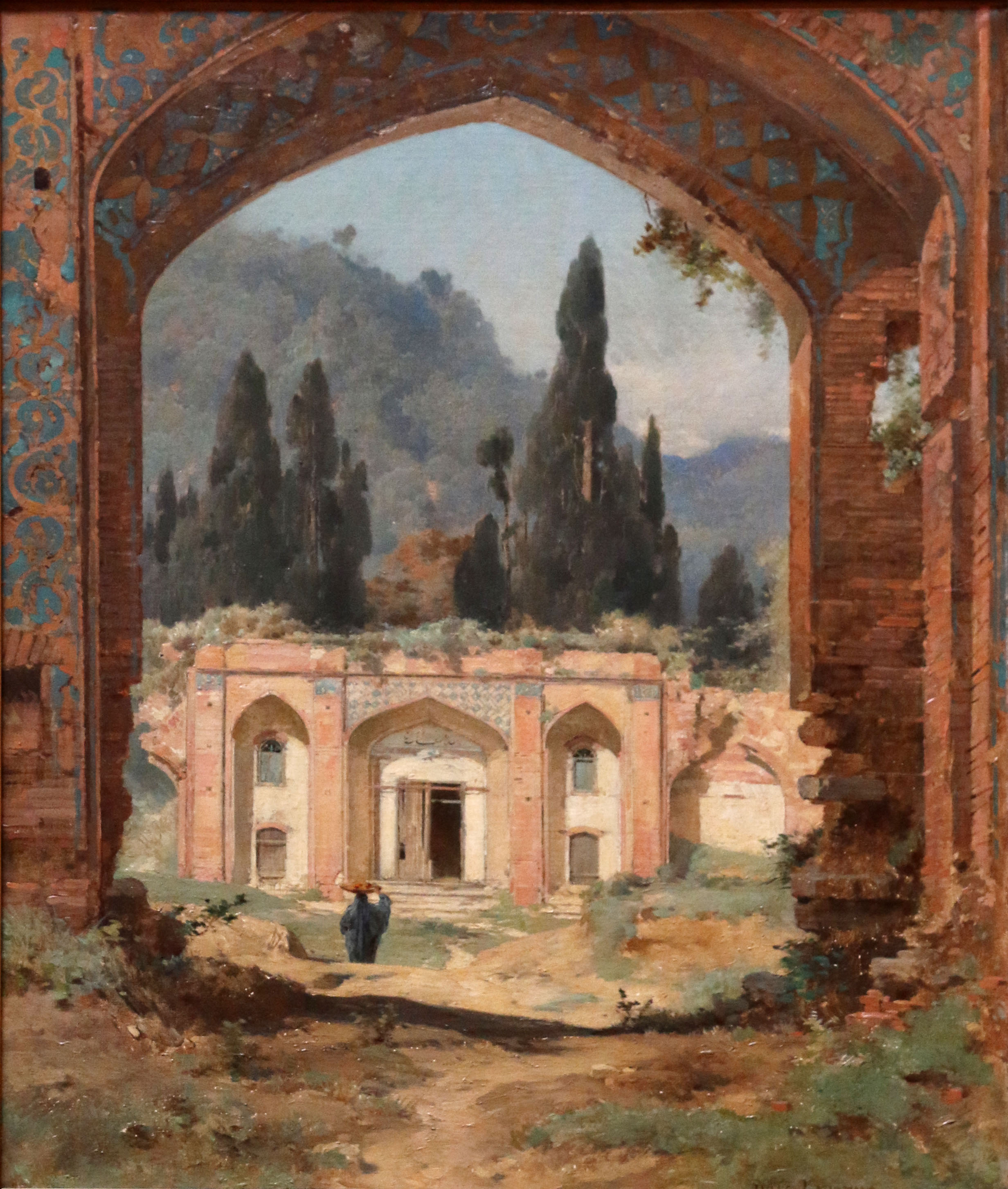
Chehel Sotun Palace (Shah Palace) by Jules Laurens

=== 20th and 21st centuries ===
==== Chit factory ====
In 1938, Behshahr's Chitsazi company was founded as a part of Mazandaran textile industry. After the Iranian Revolution, it was transferred to the national industries organization and in 1994 it was transferred to the Private sector. According to Deputy minister of Labor during Mohammad Khatami's presidency, the factory had been in crisis since 1998 and from this year onwards, its workers' salaries were not paid for several months. Due to unhealthy management, the problems of this unit have not been solved in the years after being transferred to the private sector. Obsolescence and worn-out machinery was also a problem which caused a decrease in the quality of manufactured goods and a decrease in customers. The factory was closed in October 2000 and again on 24 October 2001 following workers' protests to receive arrears payment.

On 15 April 2006, one of the shareholders declared the bankruptcy of the factory, causing workers to protest. On 7 December of the same year, the head of Behshahr's Justice Department said that the court issued the preliminary verdict of bankruptcy.
A worker stated: "With its bankruptcy under the pretext of the debts of the public and private sectors and its wrong handing over to the private sector, more than two thousand households became unemployed." After the implementation of the failed privatization and transfer plan, the lands of Chitsazi factory went to auction, and the lands and properties and waste of the factory were divided between creditor workers, social security, taxes and other public and private creditors. The political and security deputy of Mazandaran governor at the time of the factory's bankruptcy said that the bankruptcy of the factory caused irreparable damage to the economy of the region and the province, which cannot be compensated soon.

==== Floods ====
In October 2012, heavy rain in Behshahr caused damaging floods in the city when 132 mm (5.2 in) of rain fell in one hour. Several houses and schools were damaged by the floods, leading to school closures. 6 people died in the flood event. Crisis staff was formed right after the floods in the Rescue Organization of Red Crescent society.

== Demographics ==
=== Population ===
Behshahr's population was 16,172 people in 3,323 households at the time of Iran's first national census in 1956. Over 99% of the city's population was Muslim, with the remaining scarce population being Kalimi, Christian, Zoroastrian and other affiliations.

At the time of the 2006 National Census, the city's population was 83,537 in 22,034 households. The following census in 2011 counted 89,251 people in 26,406 households. The 2016 census measured the population of the city as 94,702 people in 31,022 households.

== Overview ==
The name Behshahr literally means "fine city". It includes many historical sites such as Behshahr the home of Abbas the Great, Cheshmeh Emarat Palace, Baghe Shah Gardens and the Chit Sazi weaving factory. Abbas Abbad Garden famous for its greenery and beauty and also its historic significance is a major tourism attraction. There is a road which leads up to a mountain through the jungle. In the touristic Abbas Abbad, the jungle surrounds a lake with a semi-destroyed castle in the middle. The castle once belonged to the Shah Abbas.

Behshahr is home to many famous Iranian figures ranging from actors to political figures. One of the more famous political figures from Behshahr is Ahmad Tavakkoli who once was a presidential candidate. Every year, famous members of the Iranian entertainment industry gather in Behshahr in a ceremony rewarding entertainers. More recently, such members included Parviz Parastui.

The city of Behshahr is an industrial city which produces Tokhme, vegetable oil, and a dish-soap known as Rika. Rika is the local term for son. Behshahr is home to Behshahr Industrial Company which is the biggest producer of vegetable oil in Iran since 1951. Recently, after scavenging near the suburbs of Behshahr, an ancient town was discovered which included nearly a thousand corpses of children to middle-aged men. The corpses had heights above the modern typical heights. In the area, gold and jars were found.

=== Neighborhoods ===
The city consists of several neighborhoods, some of them used to be villages which were later added to the city's urban area in 20th century.

- Bazar Mahalleh
- Municipal Park (Bagh-e Shah)
- Gorji Mahalleh
- Farash Mahalleh
- Naqqash Mahalleh
- Talesh Mahalleh
- Mahdiyeh
- Forudgah
- Qanbar Abad
- Kuy-e Farhangian
- Sang-e Zoghal
- Forudgah
- Gerayel Mahalleh: Formerly a village that was incorporated to urban area in mid-20th century.
- Zirvan: A village and a western suburb that was added to city limits in late-20th century.
- Palang Kheyl
- Kuh Kheyl
- Golsahahr
- Kovai Mahalleh
- Chit Sazi: Former site of the textile factory
- Surek Mahalleh
- Shahed
- 17 Shahrivar
- Koshtargah-e Qadim
- Qaem
- Tazehabad: Part of Zirvan

== Climate ==
Behshahr has a humid subtropical climate (Cfa) in the Köppen climate classification.

Climate data for Behshahr
Month	Jan	Feb	Mar	Apr	May	Jun	Jul	Aug	Sep	Oct	Nov	Dec	Year
Mean daily maximum °C (°F)	12.1 (53.8)	13.2 (55.8)	16.4 (61.5)	22.2 (72.0)	27.4 (81.3)	31.4 (88.5)	33.4 (92.1)	33.2 (91.8)	30.7 (87.3)	25.4 (77.7)	19.8 (67.6)	14.5 (58.1)	23.3 (74.0)
Daily mean °C (°F)	7.2 (45.0)	8.2 (46.8)	11.5 (52.7)	17 (63)	22.1 (71.8)	26.3 (79.3)	28.8 (83.8)	28.4 (83.1)	25.3 (77.5)	19.5 (67.1)	15.4 (59.7)	9.4 (48.9)	18.3 (64.9)
Mean daily minimum °C (°F)	2.3 (36.1)	3.3 (37.9)	6.7 (44.1)	11.8 (53.2)	16.8 (62.2)	21.3 (70.3)	24.2 (75.6)	23.7 (74.7)	20 (68)	13.7 (56.7)	11.1 (52.0)	4.4 (39.9)	13.3 (55.9)
Average precipitation mm (inches)	62 (2.4)	37.6 (1.48)	55.2 (2.17)	24.3 (0.96)	33.2 (1.31)	36.9 (1.45)	31.0 (1.22)	35.5 (1.40)	35.3 (1.39)	77.0 (3.03)	72.5 (2.85)	56.6 (2.23)	557.1 (21.89)
Average snowfall cm (inches)	3.33 (1.31)	3.00 (1.18)	0.50 (0.20)	0.0 (0.0)	0.0 (0.0)	0.0 (0.0)	0.0 (0.0)	0.0 (0.0)	0.0 (0.0)	0.0 (0.0)	0.81 (0.32)	0.94 (0.37)	8.58 (3.38)
Average relative humidity (%)	79.6	76	73.6	69.4	66.3	63.5	66.1	67.7	67.3	68.7	74.2	80.1	71.0
Average dew point °C (°F)	3.9 (39.0)	4.2 (39.6)	6.9 (44.4)	11.4 (52.5)	15.5 (59.9)	18.8 (65.8)	21.8 (71.2)	21.9 (71.4)	18.8 (65.8)	13.6 (56.5)	10.8 (51.4)	6.1 (43.0)	12.8 (55.0)
Mean daily daylight hours	10.5	11.3	12.4	12.4	14.6	15.1	14.9	14	12.8	11.7	10.7	10.2	12.5
Source 1: Weatherbase Weather2visit
Source 2: IRIMO(Precipitation 1970-1978). Open-Meteo(snow 2000-2024)

== Tourism ==
- Abbas Abad Garden
- Miankaleh peninsula
- International Miankaleh Lagoon
- Historical Sefidchah Cemetery
- Mellat Garden
- Ghohartape
- Museum of Behshahr Martyrs
- Palace Safiabad
- Palangan Castle
- Kusan Fireplace
- Asiab Sar Castle
- Sang No Waterfall
- Siami House
- Mellat Park (Chehel Sotoun Ashraf)
- Sikapol Bridge
- Tomb Amir Seyed Kamaluddin

== Tourist attractions ==
=== Bagh-e Shah ===
Bagh-e Shah (باغ شاه, Bāḡ-e Šāh), also known as Mellat Park, is a garden founded in 1021 AH (1612 AD) during the reign of Abbas the Great. It is located in downtown and is the seat of Behshahr city's municipality.

=== Huto and Kamarband Caves ===
Huto and Kamarband Caves, located west of the city and east of Shahidabad village, these caves were the habitats of Neanderthal humans. Excavations and explorations were made by Carleton S. Coon in 1951. The caves are notable for the human skeletons discovered there, dating to approximately 9000 years B.C. Other finds included flint blades, walrus and deer bones, giving valuable information about human development from the ice age in the Mazandaran area.

=== Cheshmeh Emarat ===
Cheshmeh Emarat (چشمه عمارت, Čašma-ye Emārat, 'manor fountain') is a spring that boils from the earth on the ground floor of the building. Water flows from the central pond of the building to four ponds surrounding the building, fed by two streams from both sides. This structure was built and started working in the Safavid period, and was registered in the list of national monuments in 1973.

The building has a water supply system that brings water up from the spring without a pump and leaves the water in the river. The art and technique of the porcelain layer can be seen in this building as well as in other buildings of the Safavid period and can be found in abundance in Safavid mansions such as Chehel Sotoun or Ali Qapu. However, the climate of the region and the resulting destruction, combined with inattention over the years, made the art unable to be restored and displayed.

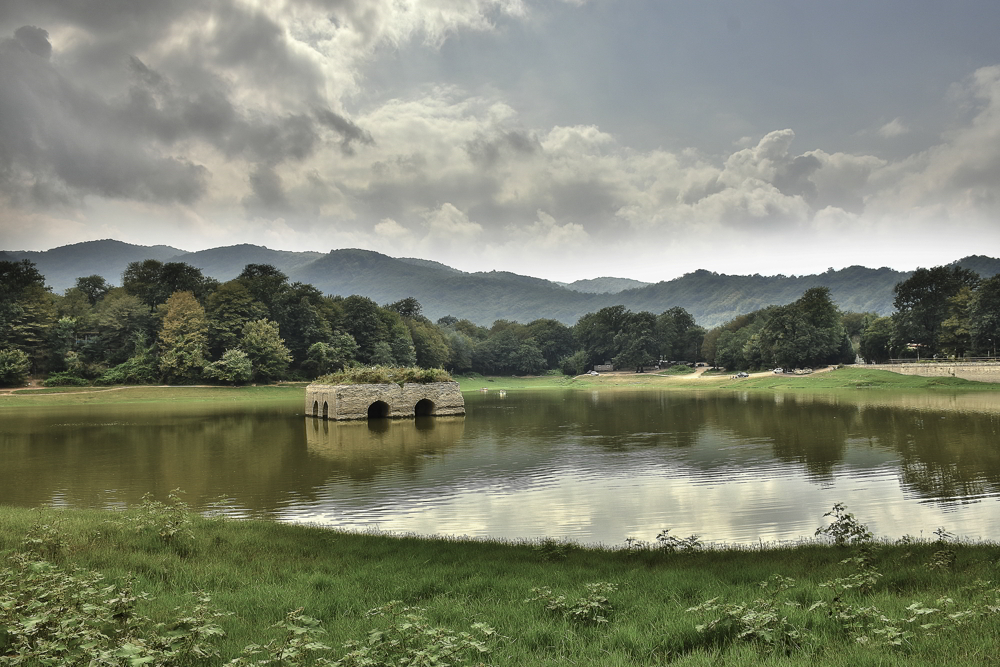
Abbas Abad Garden

=== Abbas Abbad Garden ===
Abbas Abad Garden (باغ عباس آباد, Bāḡ-e ʿAbbāsābād) is a Safavid-era Persian garden complex located southeast of Behshahr, on the slopes of the Alborz mountain range. The complex includes a reservoir, palace, bathhouse, towers, and other water-management structures. It was constructed during the reign of Shah Abbas I, and as of 2011 is a World Heritage Site, as one of nine gardens comprising The Persian Garden.

== Transport ==
Behshahr's public transport is based on taxi services, with 12 taxi lanes throughout the city, as well as 2 private transport companies which transport passengers to neighboring villages and cities. Behshahr has 2 intercity bus terminals.

== Notable people ==
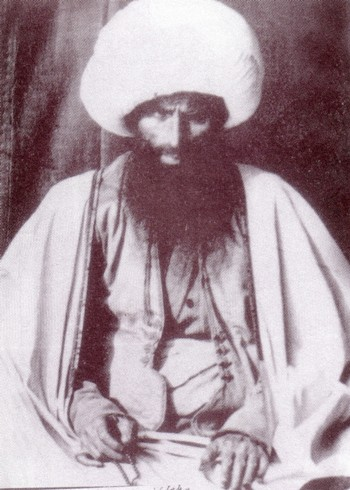
Muhammad Ashrafi

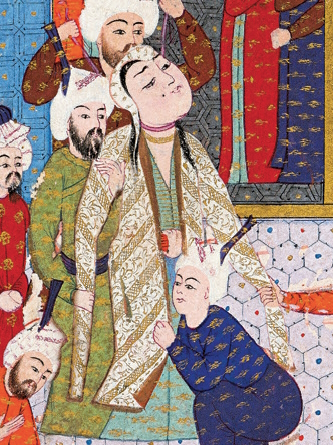
Khayr al-Nisa Begum

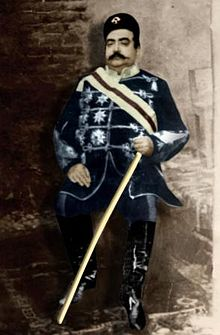
Sardar Rafie Yanehsari

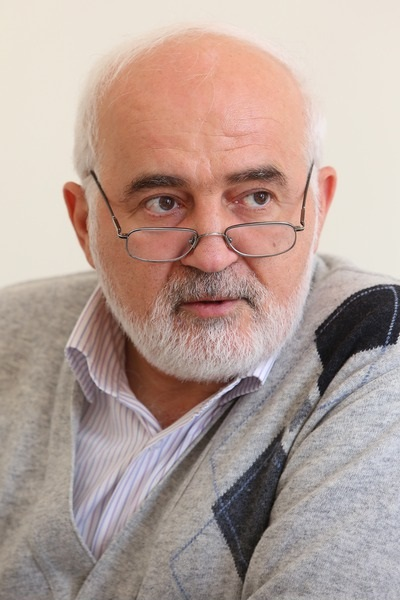
Ahmad Tavakkoli

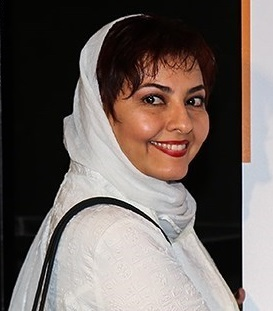
Anahita Hemmati

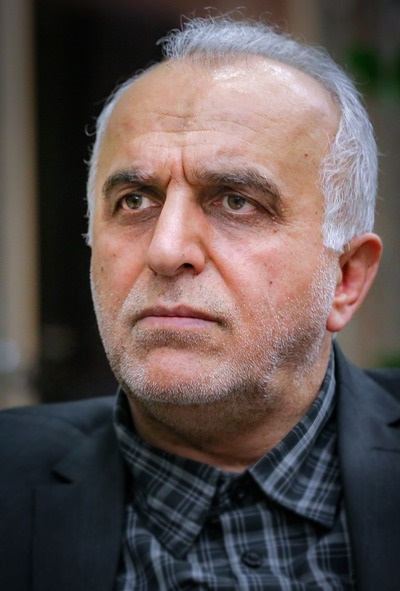
Farhad Dejpasand

- Muhammad Ashrafi – marja and cleric scholar
- Khayr al-Nisa Begum – mother of Shah Abbas I, Wife of Mohammad Khodabanda
- Sardar Rafie Yanehsari – military
- Farhad Dejpasand – politician
- Ali Yachkaschi – scholar in environmental science
- Ahmad Tavakkoli – politician
- Ali Asghar Bazri – wrestler
- Mousa Nabipour – basketball player
- Ali Rahnama – futsal player
- Behnam Ehsanpour – wrestler
- Mehrdad Tahmasbi – football player
- Mohammad Ami-Tehrani – Olympic weightlifting
- Anahita Hemmati – actress
- Syyed Abdul Karim Hashemi Nejad – dissident cleric
- Naser Kalantari – professional mixed martial artist

== Gallery ==
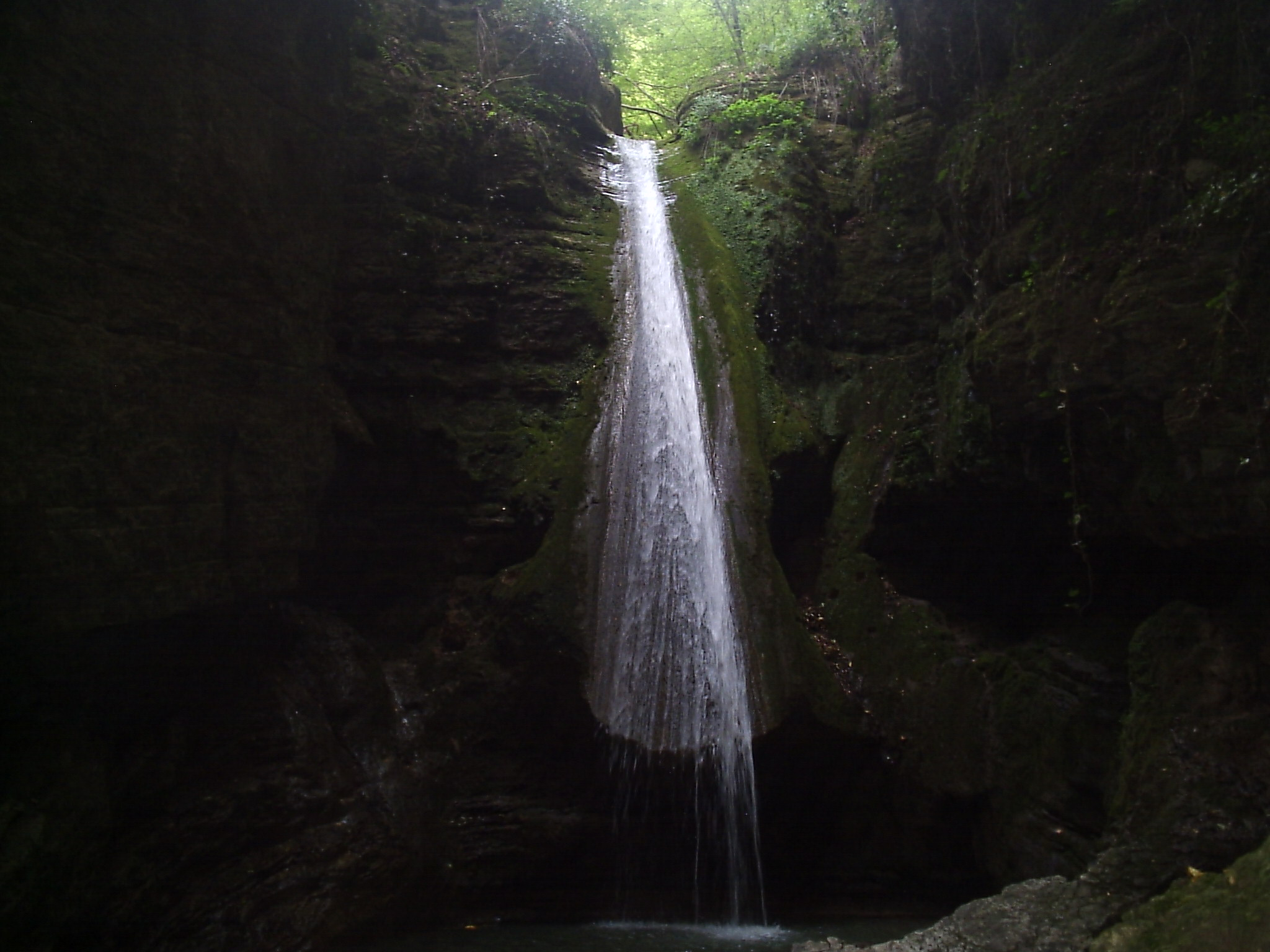
Sange No Waterfall

Shariat Shopping Mall

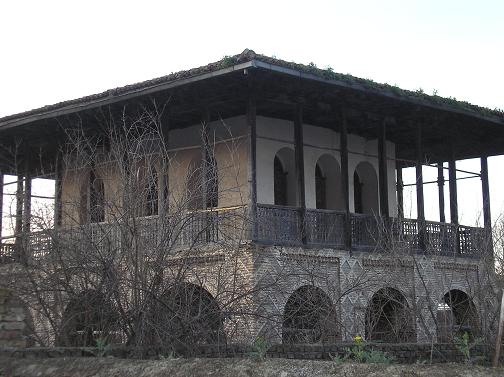
Sinai Mansion

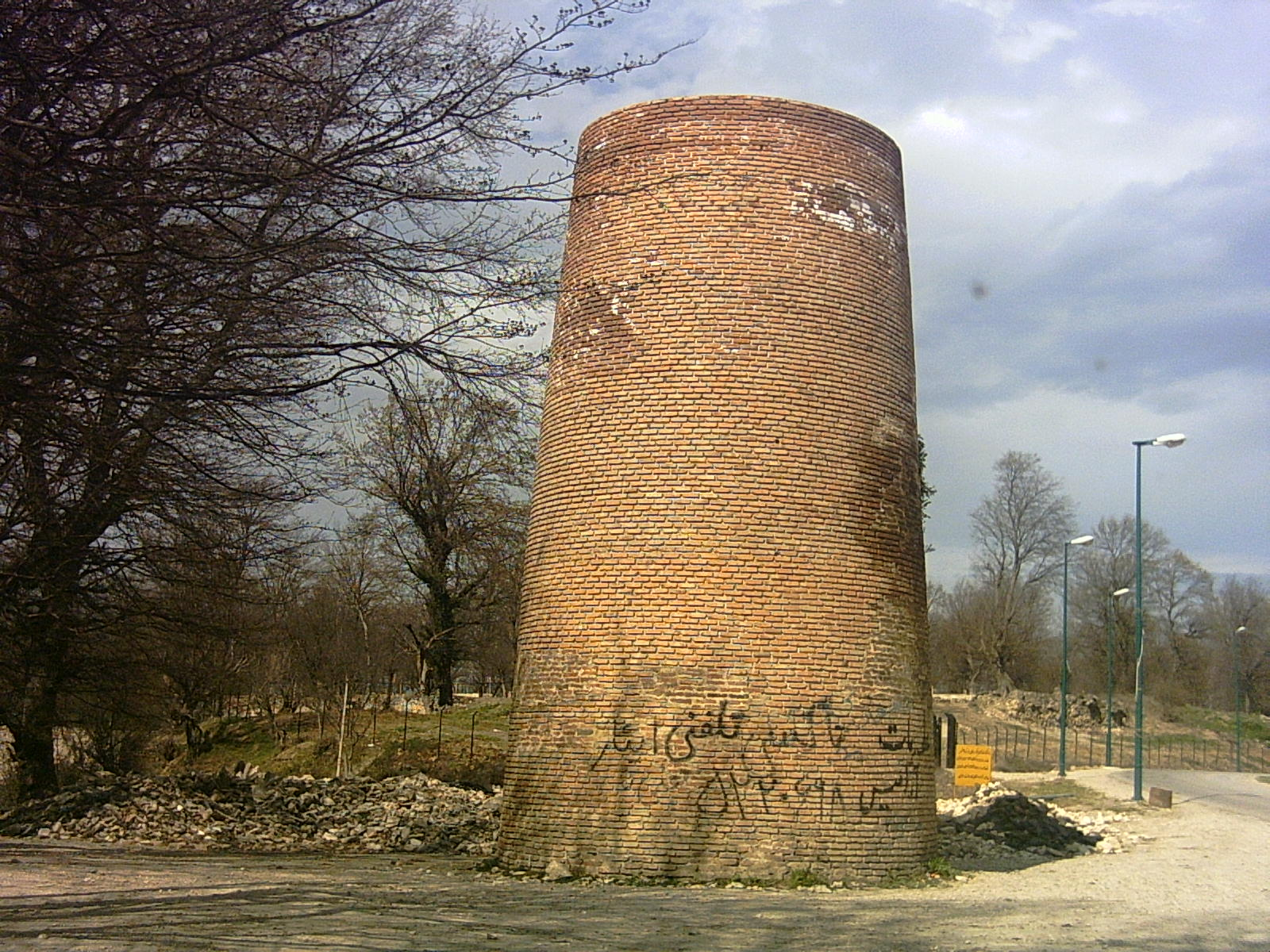
Abbas Abad Historical Complex

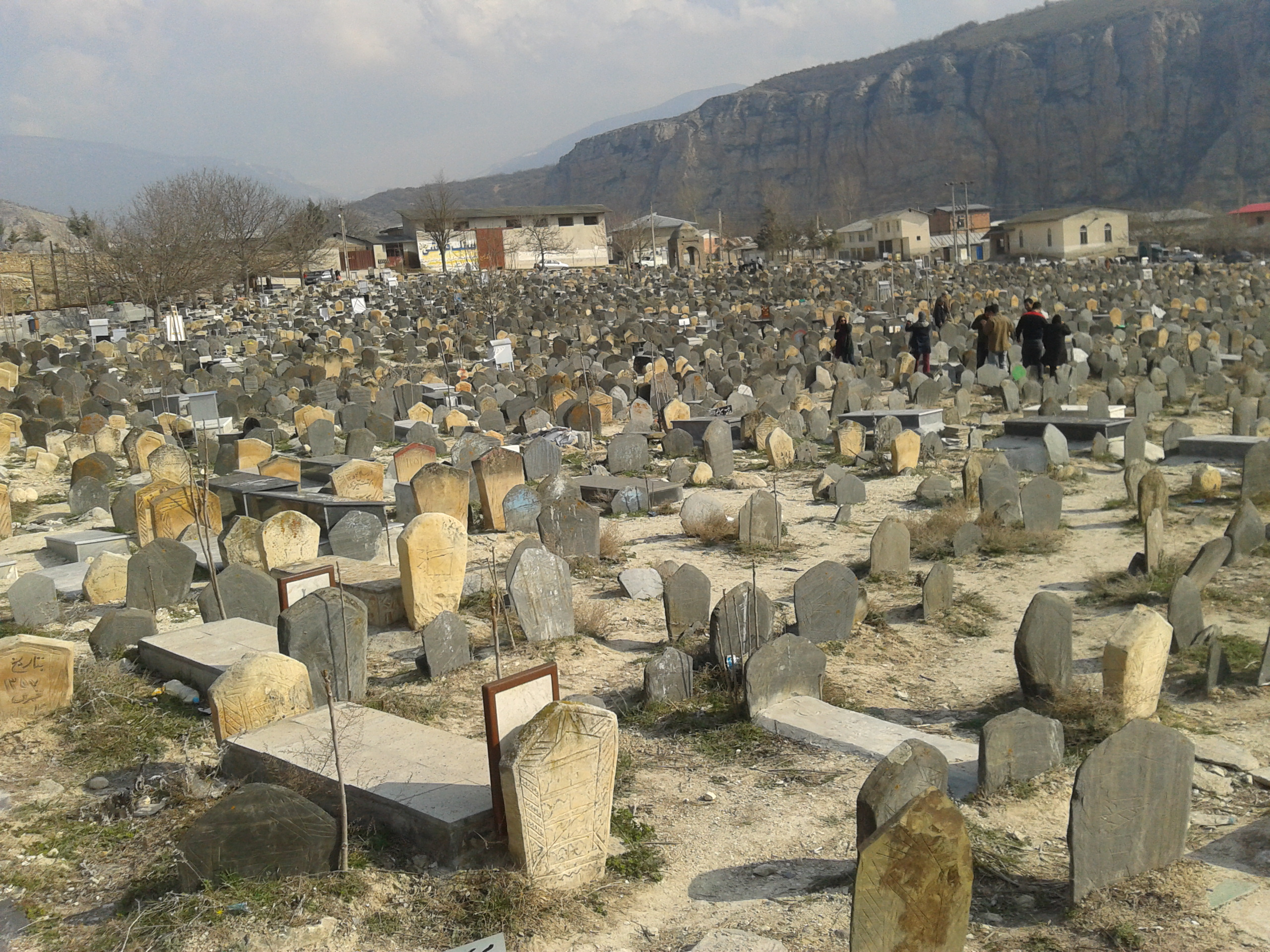
Historic Cemetery of Ispechal

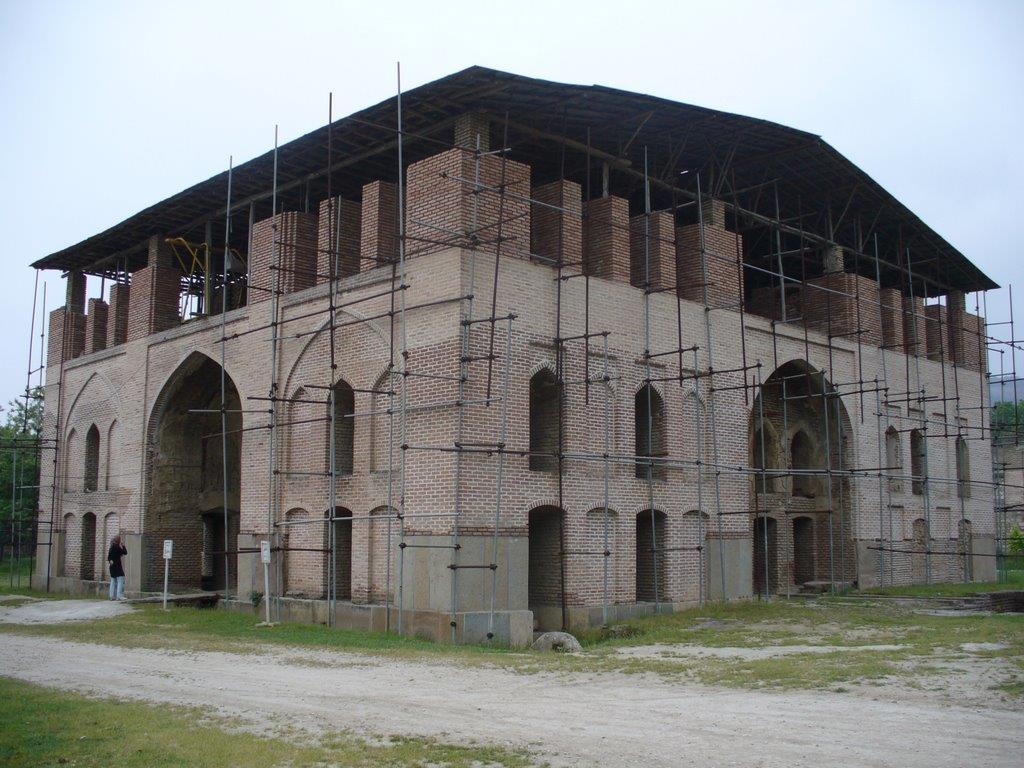
Cheshmeh Emarat

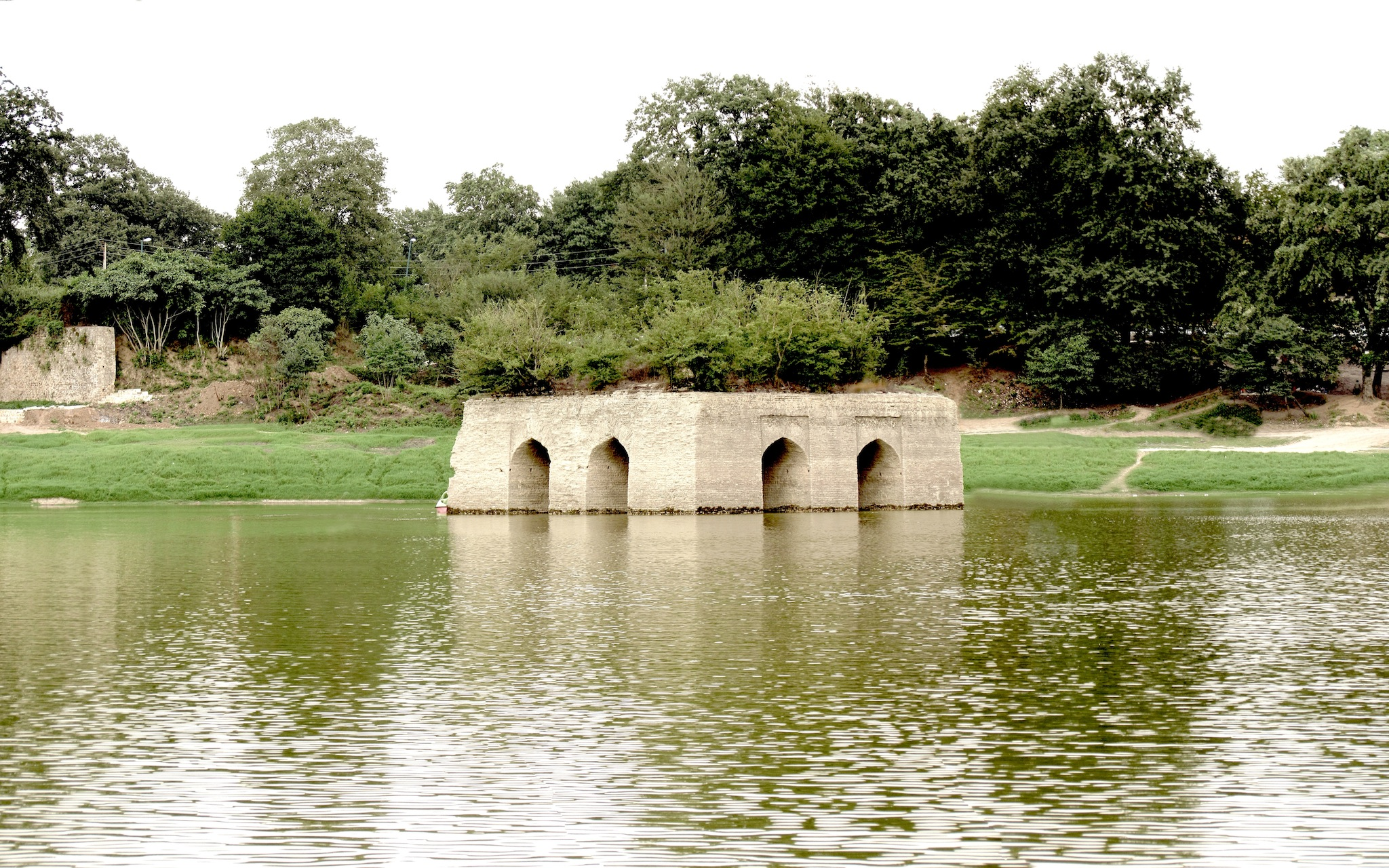
Abbas Abad Garden

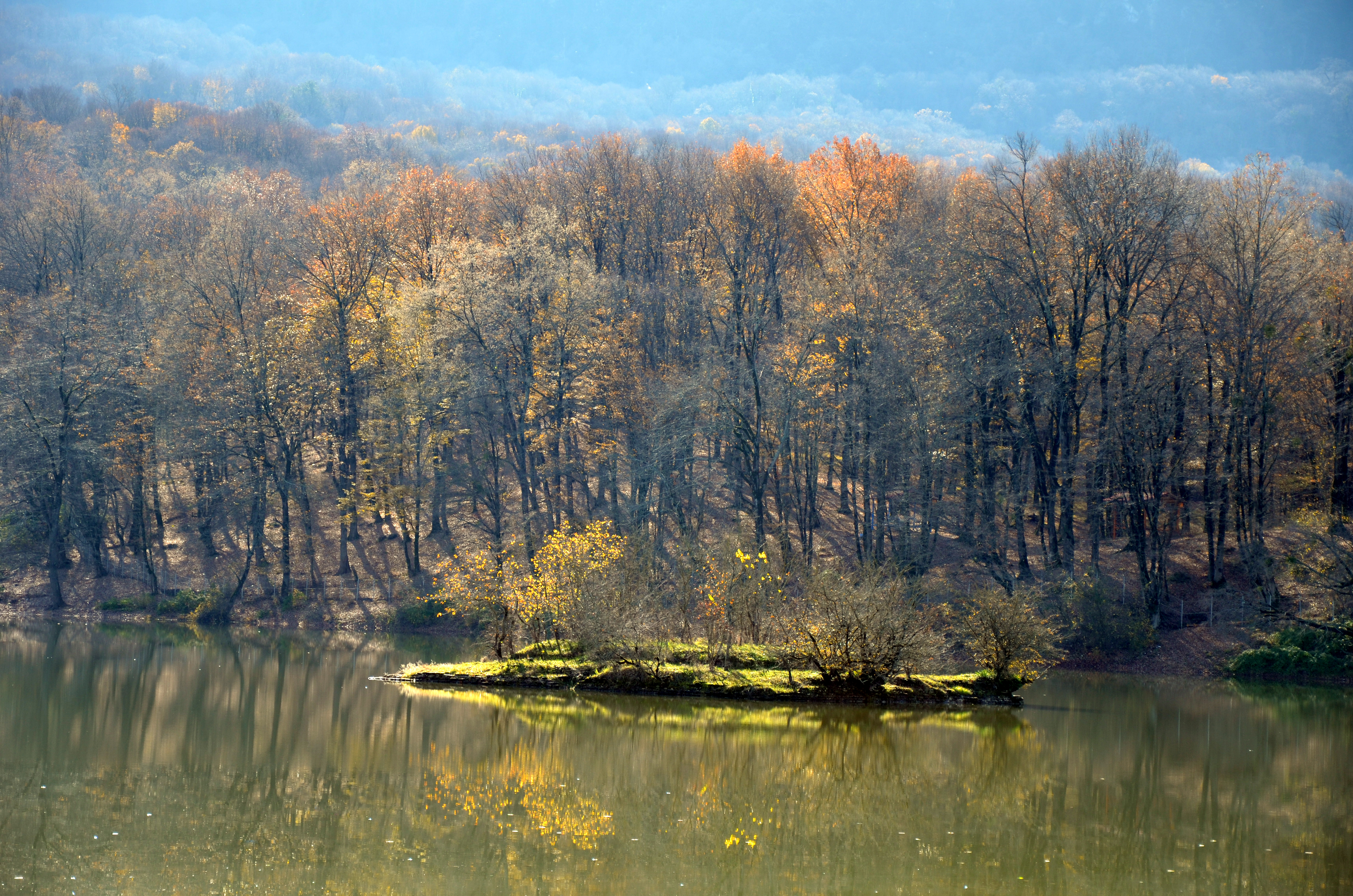
Abbas Abad Garden

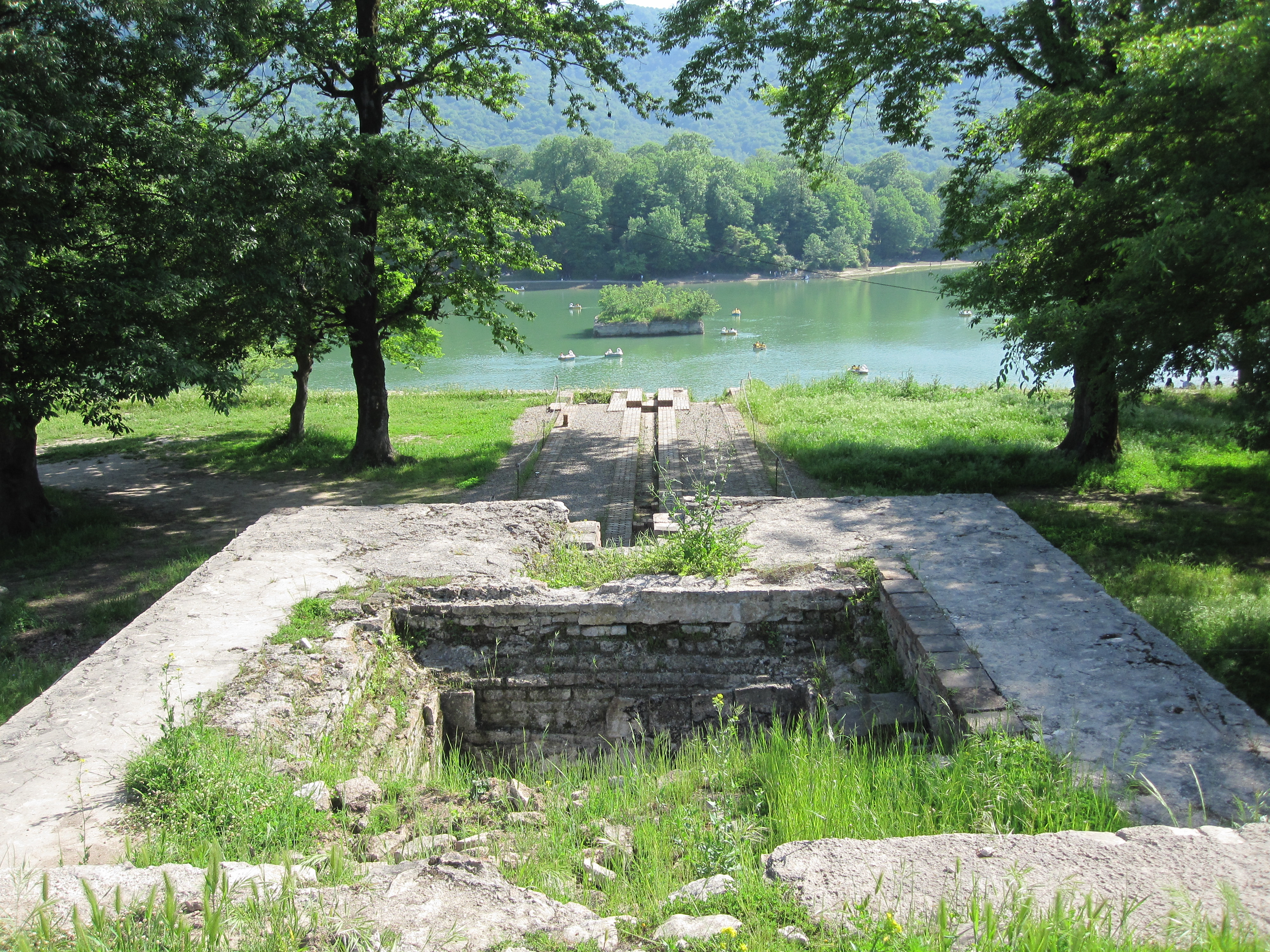
Abbas Abad Garden

== See also ==
Media related to Behshahr at Wikimedia Commons
