= Omidi Tehrani =

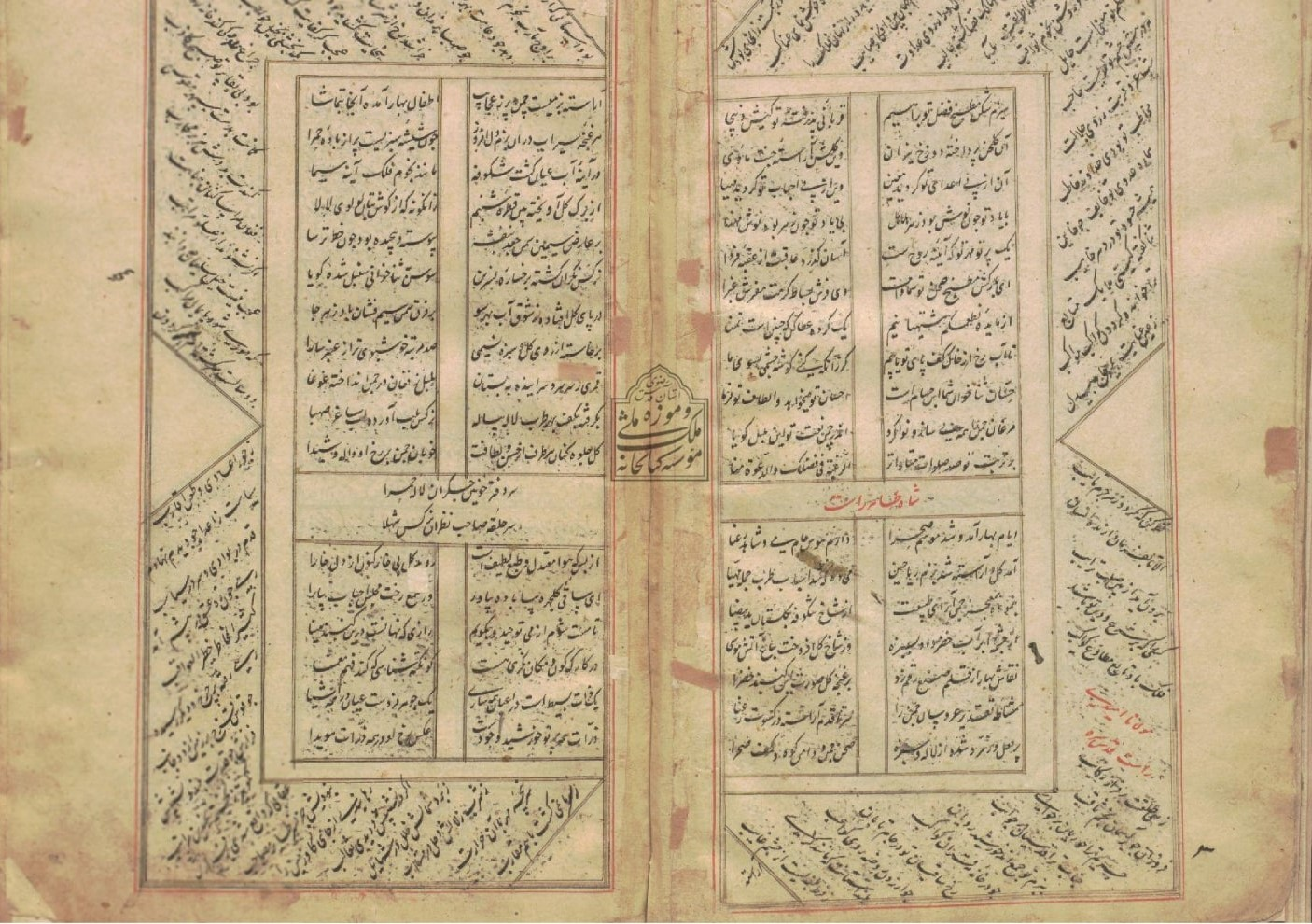
Folio of a poem by Omidi Tehrani

Omidi Tehrani (Persian: اُمیدیِ تِهْرانی; 1460–1523) was a poet active during the reign of Shah Ismail I (r. 1501–1524), the Safavid shah (king) of Iran. He is the author of a divan (collection of poems) in Persian.

== Sources ==
- Monfard, Reyhani (2019). "اُمیدیِ تِهْرانی". The Great Islamic Encyclopaedia (in Persian).
- Shafiyoun, Saeed (2022). "امیدی تهرانی،کهن‌گرای نوجوی (بررسی زندگی و شعر یکی از شاعران کم‌شناخته شده جریان‌ساز قرن دهم)". Literary Text Research (in Persian). 26 (91). Allameh Tabataba'i University: 263–288. doi:10.22054/LTR.2020.49340.2934.
