= Muhammad Ashrafi =

Iranian Grand Ayatollah (1804–1898)

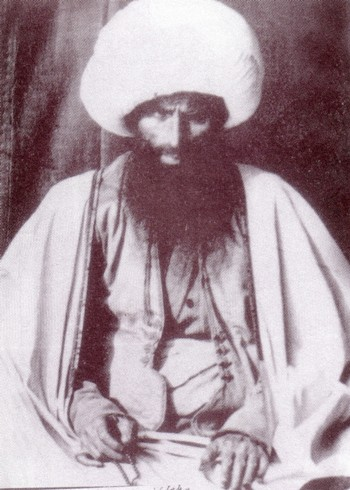
- Muhammad Ashrafi, late 1898
- Title: Grand Ayatollah

Personal life
- Born: November 19, 1804 Behshahr, Iran
- Died: January 24, 1898 (aged 93) Babol, Iran
- Era: Modern history
- Main interest: Usool Fiqh

Religious life
- Religion: Islam
- Creed: Usuli Twelver Shia Islam

Muslim leader
- Influenced by: Sa'id Ol Olama, Muhammad Hasan Najafi, Sheykh Morteza Ansari, Mohammad Bagher Shafti
- Influenced: Sheikh Abdallah Mazandarani Aliasghar Mojtahed Amirkolaei Seyed Hasan Beheshti

Grand Ayatollah Mulla Muhammad Ashrafi (Persian: آیت الله العظمی ملا محمد اشرفی) (19 Nov 1804 – 24 Jan 1898) was a leading Iranian Shia Marja' in Mazandaran; Iran from roughly 1839 to his death in 1898. His Father Mulla Muhammad Mehdi was one of the Ulama (shia clergic teacher) of Behshahr. He was his first teacher and thought him primary cleric subjects and tried to nurture him with shia knowledge and Ahl Al-Bait friendship and love.

His biography has been published under the topic of “Aseman dar Ayneh” which means “Sky into the Mirror” by effort of one of his grand children named Maryam Hojjati in 2007. His ascribed photo also has been obtained from Golestan palace’s historical album archive by Maryam Hojjati.

== Life ==
Ashrafi was born in 1804 in a Village of Latergaz. Behshahr, Mazandaran, Iran. He started to study cleric subject in a seminary in Behshahr and then Moved to Babol city. His teacher in Babol was Sa'id-Al-Ulama. His further education in Isfahan led by Mohammad Bagher Shafti. Shafti gave him the title of Hojjat al-Islam. Shafti himself was the first who granted this title in all Shia History. In his teenage years He Moved to Najaf- Iraq to study more. He contributed in Muhammad Hasan Najafi(Saheb-Javahir) and Sheikh Morteza Ansari classes. He granted the title of Ijtehad in his 21st and returned to Babol and started teaching in Babol seminary to his death in 1898. Soon he was known as one of the leading Maraji of Iranian Shia. Mulla Muhammad had special consideration over people's life in addition to their spiritual life. He was full aware of their needs especially the poor people. He was very kind to society and with this attitude most people like him very much and his popularity were increasing every day. Ashrafi's house counted as a safe place for oppressed and depraved people and they went there for their requirements and requests. "Sheikh Abdollah Mazandarani Stated" He was very watchful about the way that the government treated people and was acting as a barrier for their injustice. the city rulers were respectful for him and have fear of his power. in a case Naser al-Din Shah Qajar called him to Tehran for his intervention for supporting people against the local rulers. The action of Shah has many consequences in Mazandaran and eventually with the request of Mulla Ali kani The problem was solved and Ashrafi could return to Babol. There are many memento remained from Ashrafi in Behshahr and Babol. Aqa Mosque in Behshahr which is now active remained from him. This mosque is being managed now by his grandsons - Hodjati Family.

== His life Stories ==
There are some considerable historical stories about his life in different references which are instructive and can be used by all of us in our life. The history of his pray and dismiss of Barforoush babol ruler and his letter to Imam Reza and the response which is narrated by Mirza Hasan HakimBashi are the most famous stories of his life among people. Imam Reza's Message to Ashrafi was a verse from Saeb Tabrizi- a famous Iranian poet.

"Aieneh sho Vesal Paritalatan talab - Aval beroob Khaneh degar Mihman Talab"

Translation: "become mirror and approach to beauties - first broom the house then invite the guest."

Nasir al-din Shah visited him twice in Barforoush and maybe one time in Tehran as explained above.

In his first visit in Barforoush Shah visited him in his mansion and they talked to each other a full afternoon. Shah enjoyed his company and took a picture of him and wrote a verse on his photo.

"The people see in your picture [only] a small place [in a size of one inch]- they are unaware of a world-size meaning which is in your picture."

"Khalq Mibinand dar Tasvir-i tu yakShibr jai - Ghafiland as yek Jahan Ma'ni kih dar taswir-i tust".

Daniel Tsadik wrote this introduction and then moved to an incident which has happened a few days after this visit. the incident was between Muslims and Jews in Barforoush. He narrated six different stories from different sources. In some stories sources of information tried to accuse Governors, Hojjat Al-Islam and some Lutis whom were responsible for that incident. but in the last version which was in contrary with other five and had been reported by a Russian agent in the town, shows that Government, Hojjat Al-Islam and merchants were trying to prevent mischief.

People believe that this power came from his relentless efforts and spiritual beliefs.

== Family and Children ==
He has three sons who two of them were clerics.

=== Sheikh Muhammad ali Mojtahid ===
He was the first son of Mulla Mohammad. He became the Imam of prayers in Jameh Mosque of Babol after his father. He was born in Behshahr in 5, Shaban 1259 AH / 31 Aug 1843 CE. Although "Sheik Mohammad hasan" well known as Sheikh Kabir was the most suitable for this position, he left the position to Sheikh Mohammad Ali for the respect of Mulla Muhammad Ashrafi. after Sheikh Mohammad Ali's Death in 1324 AH, Sheikh Kabir became the Imam of the Mosque.

=== Sheikh Jafar Shariatmadar Ashrafi ===
Sheikh Jafar returned to his birthplace - Behshahr after finishing his study in Najaf and was busy teaching in Mulla safarali seminary and Bashi School his whole life. He was born on 15 Rajab 1263 AH / 29 June 1847 and died on 4 Rajab 1322 AH / 14 Sep 1904. Sheikh Mohammad Hasan -His son- was one of the most influential cleric leader during Reza Shah Era in Behshahr. He continued his father's activities in Behshahr until his death in 1372 AH. His son Sheikh Mohammad Javad Hodjati (died 1375 SH) was a famous cleric researcher and theologian in Mazandaran, Najaf and Qom. Zia al-din Hodjati (a famous Martyr of Behshahr and a member of Chamran Group of fighters) is one of Sheikh Mohammad Hasan's Grandson.

=== Mohammad Sadegh ===
He was the third son of Sheikh Jafar. He died before his father and was buried in Najaf.

== Education and academic specialties and his elite students ==
After learning some basic courses from his father, He resided in Behshahr at Mulla Safarali School for the elementary level courses. His teachers was Mulla SafarAli and Sheikh Abdollah Ashrafi who both was the followers of Sheikh Shafie Ashrafi. He continued his education in Babol seminary which was one of the most important Hawzeh in Iran at that time. Sa'id al-Ulama (died 1270 AH) was his teacher for higher education and he granted him Ijtihad Permission. In Isfahan he studied different courses and Shafti granted him the permission for Ravaiat. After finishing his courses in Isfahan Shafti granted him the title Hojjat al-Islam Ashrafi. He went to Iraq for further advancement and knowledge. He gained from Saheb-Javaher, Mohammad Hasan Shirazi and Sheikh Morteza Ansari teaching and received to the Degree of Ijtihad from Najaf and Samera Grand seminaries in age 21. Babol elites and famous clerics sent message to him while he was in Najaf and asked him to come back and accept the management of Babol seminary. In a short time after his coming back, he got the leading Marja of Mazandaran and then the whole country.

=== Books ===
1. Asrar al-shahadat in Persian - Published in 1312 SH. it is republished in 1388 for his commemoration congress.
2. Sha'aer al-Islam fi Masael Halal va Haram.
3. Code of Practice for Muslims (resaleh) in Persian with Notes from Abdollah Mazandarani
4. Almazar
5. Surah Qadr interpretation
6. Alajoobeh an al-asaleh

=== Students ===
1. Sheikh Abdollah Mazandarani - one of the Mashrotiat leaders
2. Aliasghar Mojtahid Amirkolaei
3. Valiollah Modares Baboli
4. Abolghasem HaliDashti
5. Seyed Esmail emadi
6. Seyed Hasan Beheshti
7. Mulla Rajabali Savadkuhi Alashti
8. Abdolbaghi Savadkuhi Alashti
9. Mulla Rafie Tarshizi SavadKuhi

== Death ==
Ashrafi died at 1 Ramadan 1315 AH / 24 Jan 1898 CE at age 95 in Babol. He was buried near Jameh Mosque of Babol. a crowd of Mazandaran people contributed in his funeral in Mourning groups for several days. Many Pilgrims visit his tomb every year.

== Commemorial of Mulla Muhammad Ashrafi ==
In Ordibehesht of 1390 SH / May 2011 CE a common commemorial for Allameh Ashrafi and his grand teacher - Sa'id al-Ulama was held in Babol and Behshahr concurrently. The objective for this event was to study their life, works, activities and books and to review of their beliefs and theories of Tafsir, Kalam, theosophy. "General Director of Ershad Mazandaran told" Eight Books of Mulla Muhammad and Sa'id al-Ulama republished prior to this event to be presented there.

== See also ==
- Mohammad Bagher Shafti
- Sheikh Morteza Ansari
- Jameh Mosque of Babol
- Deceased Maraji between 1201 AH to 1300 AH
- Principles of Islamic jurisprudence
- محمد اشرفی
- فهرست مراجع تقلید تا 1340 ش
