= Javadi =

Javadi (Persian: جوادی) is a surname. Notable people with the surname include:

== People ==
- Abdollah Javadi-Amoli (born 1933), Iranian politician and Islamic scholar
- Ahmad Sayyed Javadi (1917–2013), Iranian lawyer and politician
- Asghar Sayyed Javadi (1925–2018), Iranian writer and activist
- Cyrus Javadi (born 1977), American dentist and politician
- Ebrahim Javadi (born 1943), Iranian wrestler
- Fatemeh Javadi (born 1959), Iranian politician
- Fattaneh Haj Seyed Javadi (born 1945), Iranian author
- Mirmostafa Javadi (born 2000), Iranian weightlifter
- Négar Djavadi (born 1969), Iranian-French novelist and filmmaker
- Ramin Djawadi (born 1974), Iranian-German composer
- Rana Javadi (born 1953), Iranian photographer
- Roknodin Javadi (born 1957), Iranian politician and businessman
- Zeeshan Haider Jawadi (1938–2000), Indian scholar, poet, and philosopher

== Fictional characters ==
- Majid Javadi, fictional character in the TV show Homeland
- Mona Javadi, fictional antagonist in the Black Mirror TV show episode Joan Is Awful
- Victoria Javadi, fictional medical student from the American television show The Pitt. Her father Raymond Javadi appears in the show's second season.

== See also ==
- Javadi Hills, range of hills in India
