= Ali Kardor =

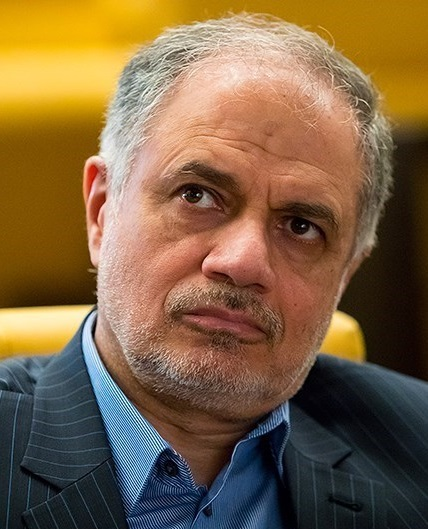
- Born: 16 May 1954 (age 72); Iran
- Education: Financial Master
- Alma mater: Allameh Tabataba'i University; Petroleum University of Technology
- Occupation: CEO of National Iranian Oil Company (2016-2018)

Ali Kardor (Persian: علی کاردر, born 16 May 1954) is an Iranian oil executive, and the former managing director of the National Iranian Oil Company (NIOC), from 2016 to 2018. Kardor joined NIOC in 1984.

Kardor was appointed managing director of NIOC in June 2016, having previously served as deputy managing director for investment and finance.

== Education ==
Kardor graduated with a M.S. in financial management from Allameh Tabataba'i University, Tehran.

== Career ==
Since Kardor has assumed management of the NIOC, it has raised oil production. Following the lifting of international trade restrictions in January 2016 – Kardor announced 4.05 million barrels of crude oil per day (bpd) by March 2018. The International Energy Agency (IEA) predicted that Iran will reach a total of 4.15 million bpd in 2022.

Prior to his appointment as managing director of NIOC, Kardor held the following positions:

- Finance and Administration Director at NIOC
- Deputy Minister of Petroleum for Commercial Affairs
- Member of the board of directors at the National Iranian Gas Company
- Member of the board of directors at Kala Naft, Tehran
- Member of the Board of Director at Kala Naft, London

Business positions
Preceded by Roknodin Javadi	Managing Director of NIOC; 2016–2018	Succeeded by Masoud Karbasian
