= Mohammad Dabir Moghaddam =

Iranian linguist

Mohammad Dabir-Moghaddam
- محمد دبیرمقدم
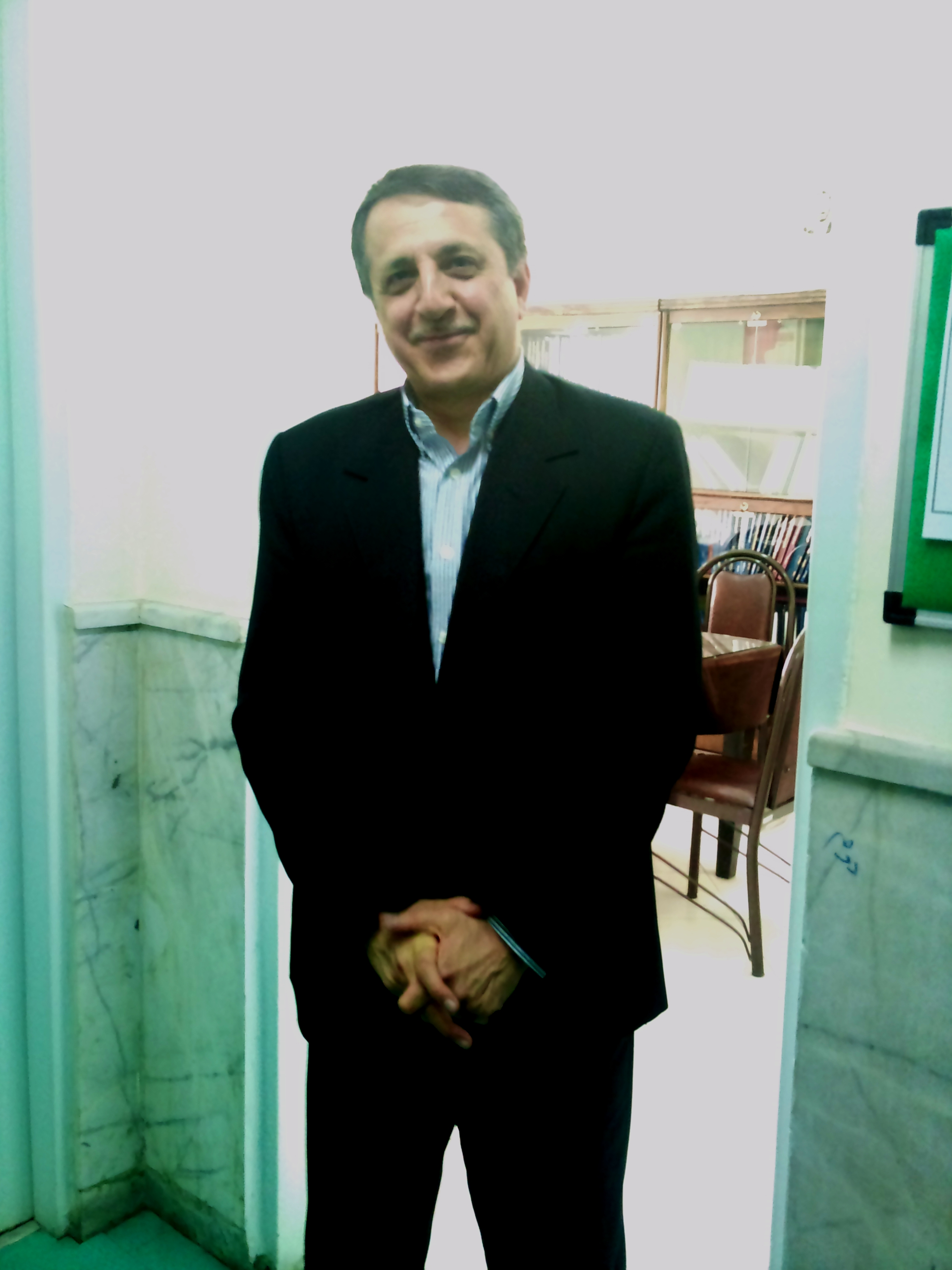
- Born: 28 August 1953 (age 72); Kashan, Iran
- Education: University of Illinois (PhD), University of Tehran (MA)
- Scientific career
- Fields: syntax, typology
- Institutions: Allameh Tabatabaee University
- Thesis: Syntax and semantics of causative constructions in Persian (1982)
- Doctoral advisor: Yamuna Kachru
- Other academic advisors: Michael Kenstowicz, Mario Saltarelli, Ladislav Zgusta

Mohammad Dabir Moghaddam (Persian: محمد دبیرمقدم) is an Iranian linguist and professor at Allameh Tabatabaee University and a permanent member of Academy of Persian Language and Literature. He was also the recipient of the Iranian Science and Culture Hall of Fame award in 2010.
