= Generative Phonology: Description and Theory =

Book by Michael Kenstowicz and Charles Kisseberth

- Author: Michael Kenstowicz, Charles Kisseberth
- Language: English
- Subject: phonology
- Publisher: Academic Press
- Publication date: 1979
- Media type: Print (hardcover)
- Pages: 459
- ISBN: 9780124051607

Generative Phonology: Description and Theory is a 1979 book by Michael Kenstowicz and Charles Kisseberth in which the authors provides an introduction to phonology in the framework of generative grammar.

== Reception ==
The book was reviewed by Daniel A. Dinnsen, Georffrey S. Nathan and Margaret W. Epro.
