= Naser Kalantari =

Iranian mixed martial arts fighter

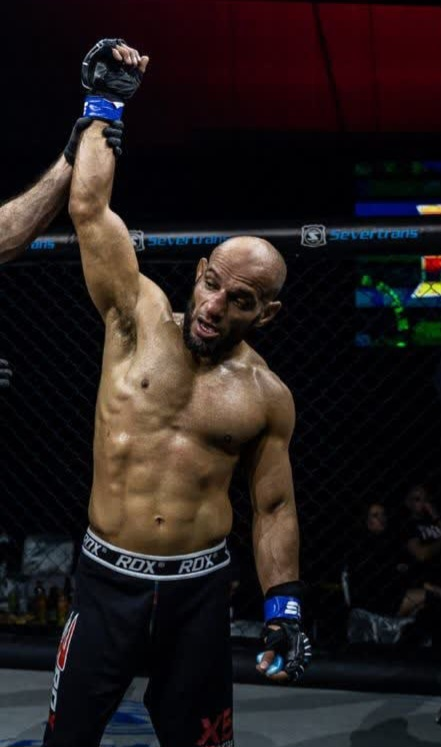
- Kalantari in 2023
- Born: Naser Kalantari; September 1, 1982 (age 44); Behshahr, Iran
- Other names: Wandering Fighter
- Nationality: Iranian
- Height: 5 ft 6 in (1.68 m)
- Weight: 170 lb (77 kg; 12 st)
- Division: Welterweight
- Style: Wrestling
- Fighting out of: Sari, Iran
- Team: Fightclub Babbajani; Serbian Vale Tudo; Rio Grappling Club Serbia
- Trainer: Aghil Heidari(wrestling); Saeed Sayyad(Combat Ju-Jutsu); Akbar Babbajani(Pankration); Jovan Joca Lukić(MMA); Oscar Magro(Brazilian jiu-jitsu)
- Rank: Blue Belt in Brazilian jiu-jitsu Brown Belt in Judo
- Years active: 2005–present

Mixed martial arts record
- Total: 7
- Wins: 5
- By knockout: 4
- By decision: 1
- Losses: 2
- By knockout: 2

Other information
- Mixed martial arts record from Sherdog

Naser Kalantari (Persian: ناصر کلانتری, born September 1, 1982) is an Iranian professional mixed martial artist, who competes in the Welterweight division in SBC. In the SBC47 event, he won in the co-main event in the city of Sombor, Serbia, over Dževad Muftić from Bosnia and Herzegovina. A professional competitor since 2015, Kalantari has won five matches out of his seven professional matches. He has won a silver medal at the 2016 Pankration Asian Championships, a gold medal and a bronze medal at the 2017 Hokutoryu Ju-Jutsu World Championships, a gold medal at the 2017 Pankration World Championships, a silver medal and a bronze medal at the 2019 Hokutoryu Ju-Jutsu World Championships, a silver medal and a bronze medal at the 2022 Combat Ju-Jutsu European Championships, and two silver medals at the 2022 Combat Ju-Jutsu Asian Championships in Uzbekistan.

== Life and career ==
Naser Kalantari was born on September 1, 1982, in Behshahr, Iran, and has heritage of Sari descent. When Kalantari was 17 years old, on July 18, 1399, his father, Mohammad Kalantari, had an accident and passed away during the launch of the Iran-Turkmenistan passenger route in Ashgabat. Following his father's death, [Nasser] Kalantari became confused and mentally weak, and finally decided to continue his father's wishes and started exercising to make his father's soul happy. After the death of his father, Kalantari first learned freestyle wrestling in the presence of Aghil Heidari in the city of Zirab in Savadkuh, and then started learning Combat Ju-Jutsu from Saeed Sayyad in Sari and working in the field of pankration with Akbar Babajani in Babol. He then started working in the field of mixed martial arts. He has a brown belt in judo and has experienced some professional Brazilian jiu-jitsu training courses at the Gracie Barra Academy in Mashhad under the supervision of Omid Delavar and the Top King Academy in Barcelona under the supervision of Oscar Magro. After joining SBC of Serbia, MFC of Montenegro and NFC of Bosnia, Kalantari started his training under the supervision of Jovan Lukić at Boleč MMA Academy in Belgrade, Serbia and became proficient in this field. Kalantari's battles are considered very aggressive and rely on freestyle wrestling and a combination of his skills in pankration techniques and Brazilian jiu-jitsu, and his athletic life is inspired by world boxing champion Joe Frazier and cycling champion Lance Armstrong. He made his professional MMA debut in the summer of 2015, winning via technical knockout.

In October 2014, Kalantari was sent to the world championships in Turkey as a member of the Iranian national wrestling team in the men's grappling range in the No GI section. In his first match in Alanya, Turkey, he faced the representative of Italy at the weight of 84 kg, and in the second minute of the first round, he was caught in the opponent's submission techniques. ACL and MCL meniscus tears and damage to the patella of the left leg. However, Kalantari continued the game and won 3–2. In the second round, he faced the representative of France, who had European and world gold. Although the technical staff of the national team asked him to rest due to the severity of the injury, he went to the mat of the arena and lost the game in the last seconds with a score of 1–0. Due to his severe injury, he was unable to walk. He left the arena in a wheelchair. He also won the third place in the national championship in adult grappling competitions.

In July 2017, as a member of Mazandaran martial arts team, Kalantari went to Croatia to participate at the 2017 Hokutoryu Ju-Jutsu World Championships. He won a gold medal and a bronze medal at the champions. In the first round, after winning 7–0 against the representative of Ukraine in the second round, he defeated the representative of Cuba with a knockout result and went to the semi-finals, but at this stage, in the golden time, he lost to Arlan Telumbtov from Kazakhstan with a difference of one point. He missed the chance to be in the finals. In the ranking match, he defeated the opponent representing Panama and won the bronze medal. In the same year, Kalantari represented the weight of 77 kg in pankration at the Olympic Stadium in Sochi, Russia. In the first round, he fought with Mikhail Odintsev from Belarus and finally managed to defeat him with a score of 1–0, and in the second round he faced Landa Bandan from Ukraine and won with a score of 10–9. He was the only finalist of the Iranian team that day in the World Championships in Russia. Kalantari faced Yuri Vernitsen in the final match of this weight and in the end lost with the result of 9-5 and received the silver medal.

Two years later, he won a silver medal at the 2019 Hokutoryu Ju-Jutsu World Championships in Kyrgyzstan. Kalantari represented the weight of 84 kg in the Asian battles, and in the first round, he faced his opponent from Kazakhstan, who was the world champion in 2018 in the Czech Republic, and Kalantari won against him. In the second round, he faced the representative of Tajikistan and won with a knockout result, and finally, in the final match of this weight, he faced the host's opponent and was defeated and was awarded the silver medal. In the same year, he was announced as one of the two top fighters of Serbian Battle Championship (SBC), competing with the Bulgarian mixed martial artist Vladislav Kanchev on the main event. Kalantari has described going to Serbia and fighting in Zrenjanin as "a big step" for his career, stating: "The audience will surely enjoy it. I will give my best to win." However, he was finally defeated by Kanchev. The following year, he participated on SBC again, where he was defeated by Oleg Manzhuev.

In 2022, he won two silver medals at the 2022 Combat Ju-Jutsu Asian Championships in Uzbekistan. Kalantari, who participated in the weight of 77 kg, defeated the representative of Kazakhstan in the first round, and in the second round, he faced the representative of the second team of Kazakhstan and defeated him and went to the finals of the tournament. In this way, Kalantari became the first finalist of the Iranian team in the Asian Championships and in the final match of this weight, he faced Shahboz Nurmotov, the runner-up of the world sambo champion, and in the end he was defeated with a score of 1-0 and won the Asian silver medal. On the second day of this competition in Bukhara, in his first match, he was able to defeat the representative of Kazakhstan with a technical blow and advance to the next stage, and in the next stage, he fought with the representative of Uzbekistan, and in the end, he won with a score of 3–0. He joined the top four martial artists of this period in the competition. Kalantari competed against the Uzbek opponent in the semi-final of this tournament and won this match and reached the final. Finally, in the final of this weight, he faced an opponent from Kazakhstan, and the result was a 1–0 defeat and another silver medal. Despite the success of Kalantari and his Iranian teammates in the Asian Championships, the team could not reach the World Championships in Spain, as the country's embassy excluded them.

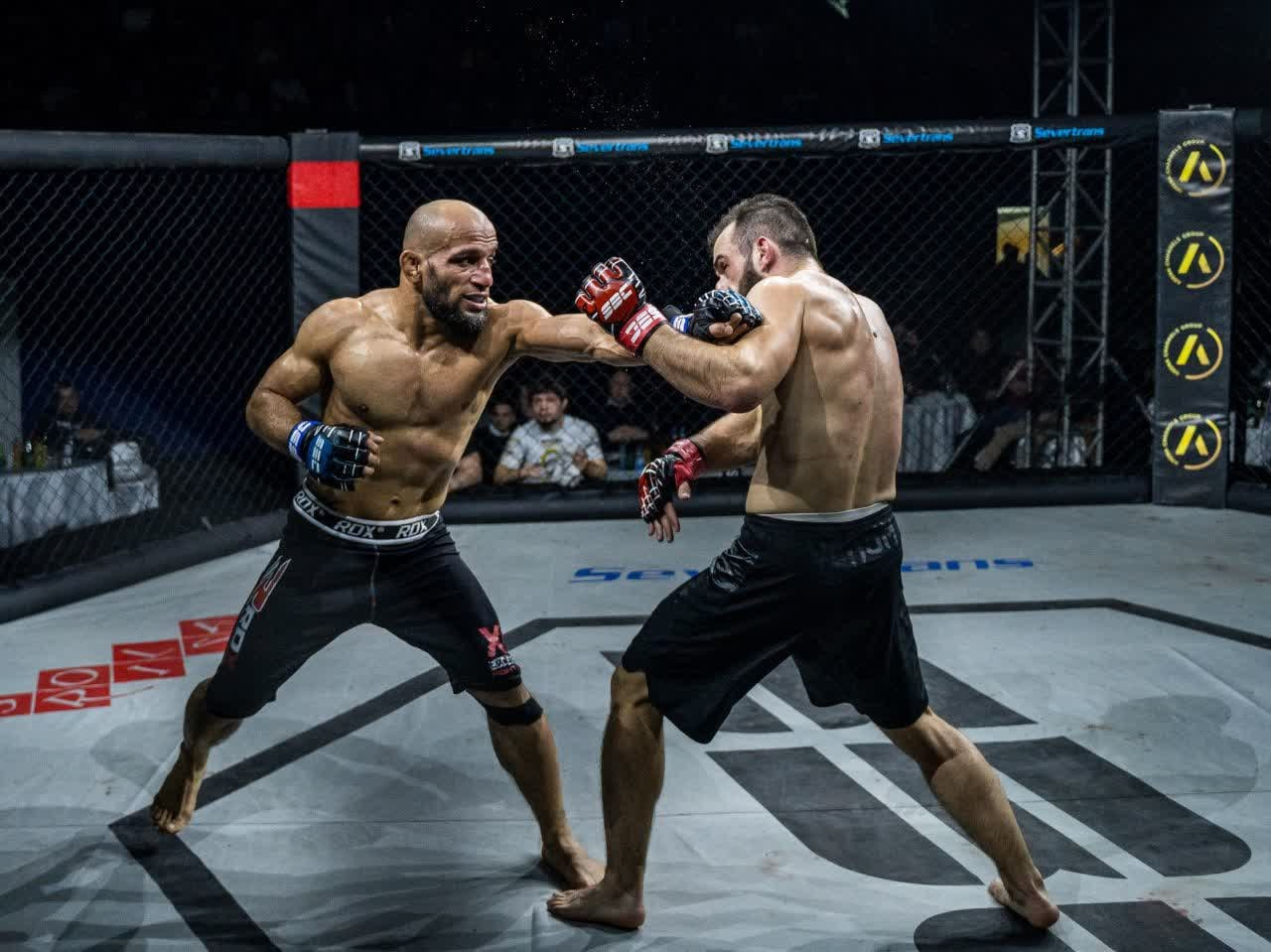
Kalantari and Muftić fighting during the SBC 47 co-main event in 2023.

After Dževad Muftić's back-to-back lightweight victories in Serbia, the SBC called for a match between Muftić and Kalantari. Although Kalantari was away from MMA fights for three years and was busy learning boxing and Muay Thai, on February 17, 2023, he faced Muftić at the SBC 47 co-main event in Sombor, Serbia, and won the fight after 15 minutes. Kalantari was severely injured in the arms, legs and nose after the fight.

== Personal life ==
Kalantari earned a degree of mining engineering from Savadkuh University. He is a Shīʿa Muslim and speaks Persian, English, and Russian. In 2006, he married Behnaz Yazdani Cherati, from the Cherat tribe of Savadkuh, and the result of their marriage is a son named Muhammad, born in 2011, and a daughter named Shayli, born in 2021.

After his father's death, Kalantari became the chairman of the board of directors of his father's company, Parto Seir Iranian International Passenger Transport Company. This company is in the field of international passenger transportation in the countries of Afghanistan, Pakistan, Uzbekistan and Iraq, and its fleets at the borders of Islam Qala, Afghanistan, Taftan, Pakistan, Gwadar, Pakistan, Sarakhs, Uzbekistan, and the borders of Iraq, move travelers from place to place daily. Kalantari spends a percentage of the company's income and earnings from his sports competitions to help providing school fees for poor children, supporting homeless children, helping charities, helping underprivileged athletes aged 6 to 10, and free sports training for children interested in mixed martial arts.

== Mixed martial arts record ==
Professional record breakdown
7 matches	5 wins	2 losses
By knockout	4	2
By decision	1	0

Res.	Record	Opponent	Method	Event	Date	Round	Time	Location	Notes
Win	5–2	Dževad Muftić	Split Decision	SBC 47	February 17, 2023	3	15:00	Sombor, Serbia	
Loss	4–2	Oleg Manzhuev	TKO (punches)	SBC 26	February 16, 2020	1	3:13	Sombor, Serbia	Lightweight (154 lbs) bout.
Loss	4–1	Vladislav Kanchev	KO (punch)	SBC 24	October 19, 2019	1	4:48	Zrenjanin, Serbia	Welterweight (170 lbs) bout.
Win	4–0	Shahin Najafi	TKO	Kurd FC	September 11, 2015	3	1:33	Sulaymaniyah, Iraq	
Win	3–0	Mehdi Mousavi	TKO (punches)	IUFC 13	August 28, 2015	1	0:45	Karaj, Iran	
Win	2–0	Hassani Idrissi Mustapha	TKO (punches)	IUFC 12	August 11, 2015	1	1:09	Karaj, Iran	
Win	1–0	Hosein Helali	TKO (punches)	IUFC 12	August 11, 2015	1	2:10	Karaj, Iran	
