= Phonology in Generative Grammar =

Book by Michael Kenstowicz

- Author: Michael Kenstowicz
- Language: English
- Series: Blackwell Textbooks in Linguistics
- Subject: phonology
- Genre: textbook
- Publisher: Blackwell
- Publication date: January 1994
- Media type: Print (hardcover)
- Pages: 720
- ISBN: 978-1-557-86426-0

Phonology in Generative Grammar is a 1994 book by Michael Kenstowicz in which the author provides an introduction to phonology in the framework of generative grammar.

== Reception ==
The book was reviewed by Daniel A. Dinnsen, Stephen Parker, Tracy Alan Hall and Jolanta Szpyra. Helen Fraser calls it a "very large, very thorough and very highly regarded phonology textbook."
