= Zirvan =

Zirvan زیروان
- Neighborhood
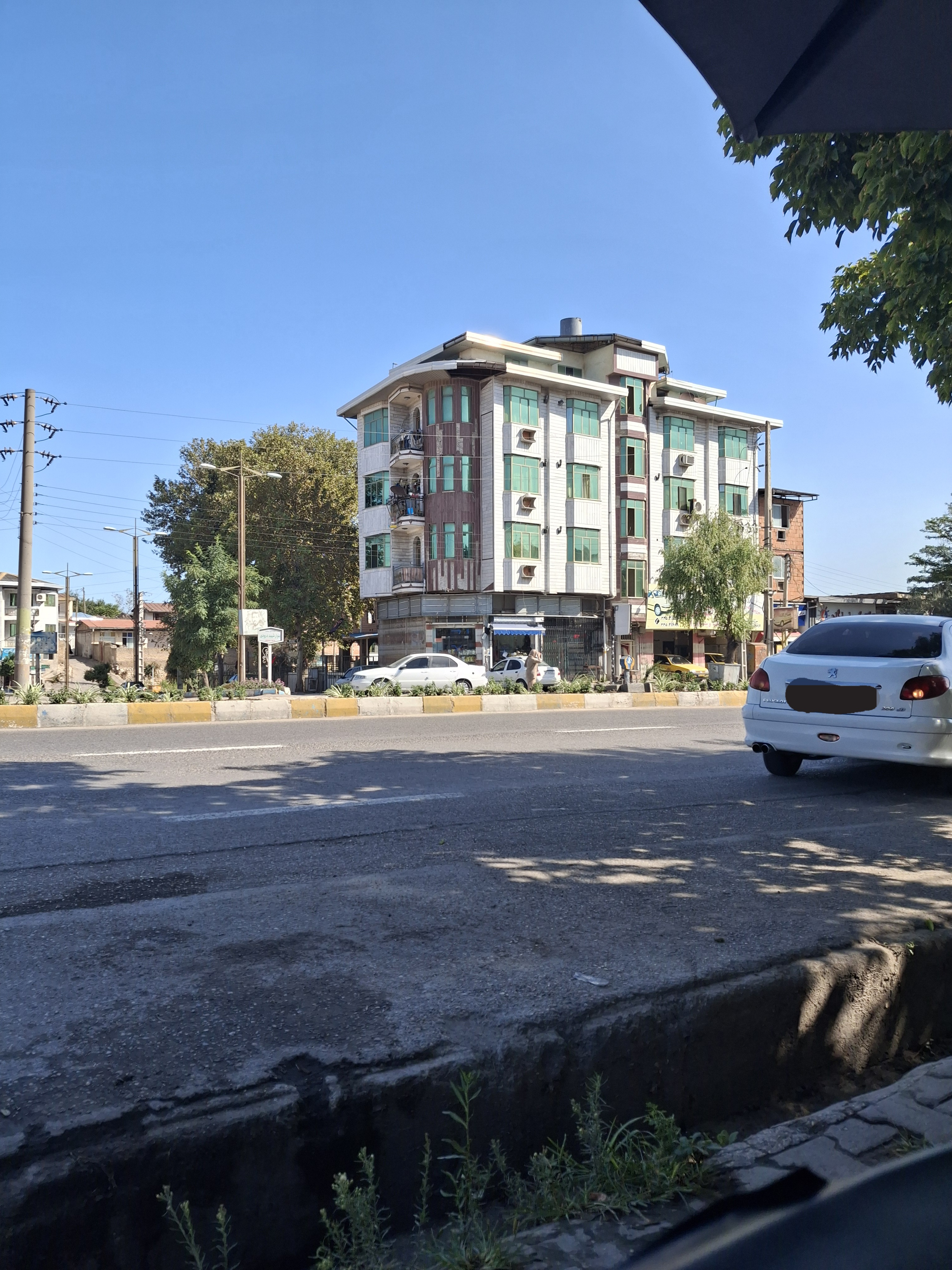
- Interactive map of Zirvan
- Coordinates: 36°41′34.271″N 53°30′50.497″E
- Country: Iran
- Province: Mazandaran
- County: Behshahr
- City: Behshahr
- Time zone: UTC+3:30 (IRST)

Zirvan (Persian: زیروان, romanized: Zirvān) is a neighborhood in the city of Behshahr in Behshahr County of Mazandaran Province, Iran. Formerly, it was a village west of the city.

== Geography ==
Zirvan is in the western part of Behshahr city. Its outskirts have lush forests. Palang Kheyl spring, which is a natural sight, is a popular destination in summer. This spring is 3 km (1.9 mi) southwest of Behshahr. Due to the low water output from Palang Kheyl spring, the population was smaller downstream of the river (Zirvan area) than in other parts of Behshahr city .

There are several shrines in Zirvan. Such as the Emamzadeh of Fazl, Fazel, and Abbas. The shrine has an old olive tree which was registered as a natural heritage sight.

== Demographics ==
Zirvan village population history
Year	Pop.	±%
1956	483	—
1966	750	+55.3%
1976	1,559	+107.9%
1986	2,957	+89.7%

=== Population ===
At the 1976 census, Zirvan was in Qareh Toghan Rural district of Behshahr County. Its population was 1,559 people in 263 households. Zirvan had power and water infrastructure, it also has Mosque and Elementary school. Post and Phone services were available at that time.

At the 1986 census, Zirvan's population was 2,957 people in 559 households. The village also had Middle school at the time of the census.

Different tribes live in Zirvan. In general, the population of Zirvan is made up of the tribes mentioned below:

1-The Zirvani tribe, who are the original inhabitants and founders of Zirvan.

2-The Pavandi tribe who migrated from Paband to Zirvan.

3-The Turkish tribe of immigrant residents.

4-The Baladehi tribe, who live in Tazehabad neighborhood of Zirvan.

5-The Badabasri tribe who migrated from Badabsar and settled in the neighborhood.

== Sports ==
Zirvan has a football club named "Shohada-ye Zirvan" (Persian: شهدای زیروان, romanized: Shohadā-ye Zirvān, lit. 'Zirvan Martyrs'), competing in Behshahr's 1st division football league.
