= Mir Jalaleddin Kazzazi =

Iranist professional (b. 1949)

Mir Jalaleddin Kazzazi میرجلال‌الدین کزازی
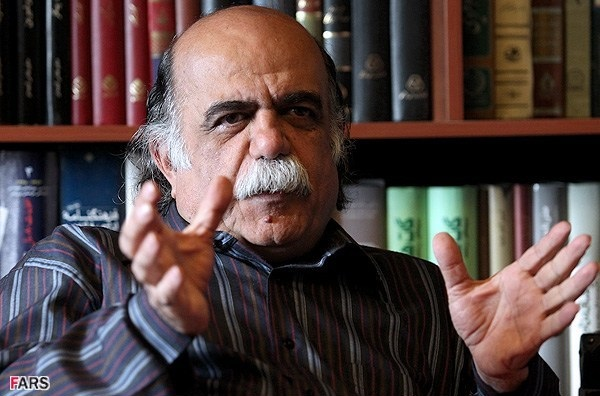
- Born: January 19, 1949 (age 77); Kermanshah, Iran
- Occupations: Academic, writer and translator of literary works.
- Website: www.kazzazi.com

Mir Jalaleddin Kazzazi (Persian: میرجلال‌الدین کزازی; born 19 January 1949) is a professor of Persian literature and an Iranist.

Kazzazi is a professor of literature at Allameh Tabataba'i University in Tehran. He is known for his work on the Shahnameh, a Persian long epic poem written between c. 977 and 1010 CE.

Kazzazi was inducted into the Iranian Science and Culture Hall of Fame for his contribution to Persian culture and literature.

== See also ==
- Iranology
- Kermanshahis
- Shahnameh
