= Mohammad Ami-Tehrani =

Iranian weightlifter (1935–2020)

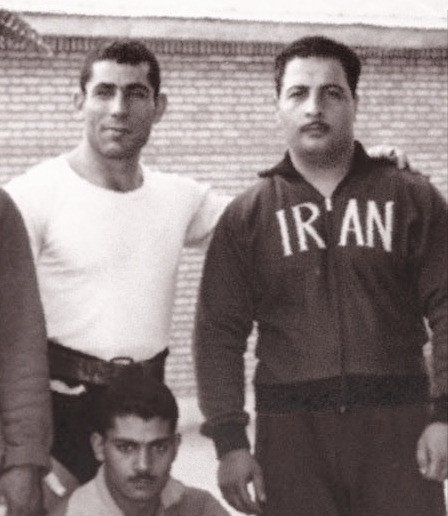
- Ami-Tehrani (left) in 1960

Personal information
- Born: 20 September 1935 Behshahr, Iran
- Died: 15 March 2020 (aged 84) Tehran, Iran
- Height: 172 cm (5 ft 8 in)
- Weight: 75 kg (165 lb)

Sport
- Sport: Weightlifting
Medal record
Representing Iran
World Championships
Bronze medal – third place	1962 Budapest	75 kg
Asian Games
Bronze medal – third place	1966 Bangkok	75 kg
Asian Championships
Gold medal – first place	1965 Tehran	75 kg

Mohammad Ami-Tehrani (Persian: محمد عامی تهرانی, 20 September 1935 – 15 March 2020) was an Iranian middleweight weightlifter. He won bronze medals at the 1962 World Championships and 1966 Asian Games and placed sixth at the 1960 Summer Olympics.
