= Masoud Karbasian =

Iranian economist and politician

- مسعود کرباسیان
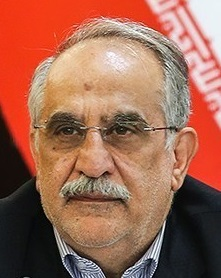
- Karbasian in 2018

Managing Director of National Iranian Oil Company
- In office 18 November 2018 – 22 September 2021
- President: Hassan Rouhani
- Preceded by: Ali Kardor
- Succeeded by: Mohsen Khojastemehr

Minister of Economic Affairs and Finance
- In office 20 August 2017 – 26 August 2018
- President: Hassan Rouhani
- Preceded by: Ali Tayebnia
- Succeeded by: Farhad Dejpasand

Personal details
- Born: 1956 (age 69–70) Isfahan, Iran
- Occupation: CEO of National Iranian Oil Company (2018–2021)
- Awards: Order of Merit and Management

Masoud Karbasian (Persian: مسعود کرباسیان) is an Iranian economist who is the former CEO of National Iranian Oil Company (NIOC), served from 2018 to 2021. He was minister of finance from August 2017 until his impeachment in August 2018. He previously held office as ex-officio vice minister of finance, heading Iran's Customs Administration.

Karbasian holds a Ph.D. in commercial management and has served as a vice minister for heavy industries, petroleum and commerce government ministries.

== Views ==
He is described as a "technocrat" and reformist.
