= Michael Kenstowicz =

American linguist

- Born: August 18, 1945; Chicago, Illinois
- Education: University of Illinois (PhD), San Jose State University (BA)
- Scientific career
- Fields: linguistics
- Institutions: University of Illinois at Urbana–Champaign, MIT
- Thesis: Lithuanian Phonology (1971)
- Doctoral advisor: Charles Wayne Kisseberth
- Other academic advisors: Theodore M. Lightner; Chin Woo Kim
- Doctoral students: Rodolfo Cerrón Palomino
- Other notable students: Mohammad Dabir Moghaddam

Michael John Kenstowicz (born August 18, 1945) is an American linguist and a professor in the Department of Linguistics and Philosophy at the Massachusetts Institute of Technology (MIT). He is best known for his works on phonetics and phonology. His book Phonology in Generative Grammar is widely used as a coursebook in phonology classes around the world. Since 1987, he has served an editor of the journal Natural Language & Linguistic Theory .

== Books ==
- Phonology in Generative Grammar, Blackwell Publications 1994
- Generative Phonology: Description and Theory, with Charles Kisseberth, Academic Press 1979
- Topics in Phonological Theory, with Charles Kisseberth, Academic Press 1977
