= Allameh Tabataba'i University =

University in Tehran, Iran

Coordinates: 35.7600°N 51.2600°E

- دانشگاه علامه طباطبائی
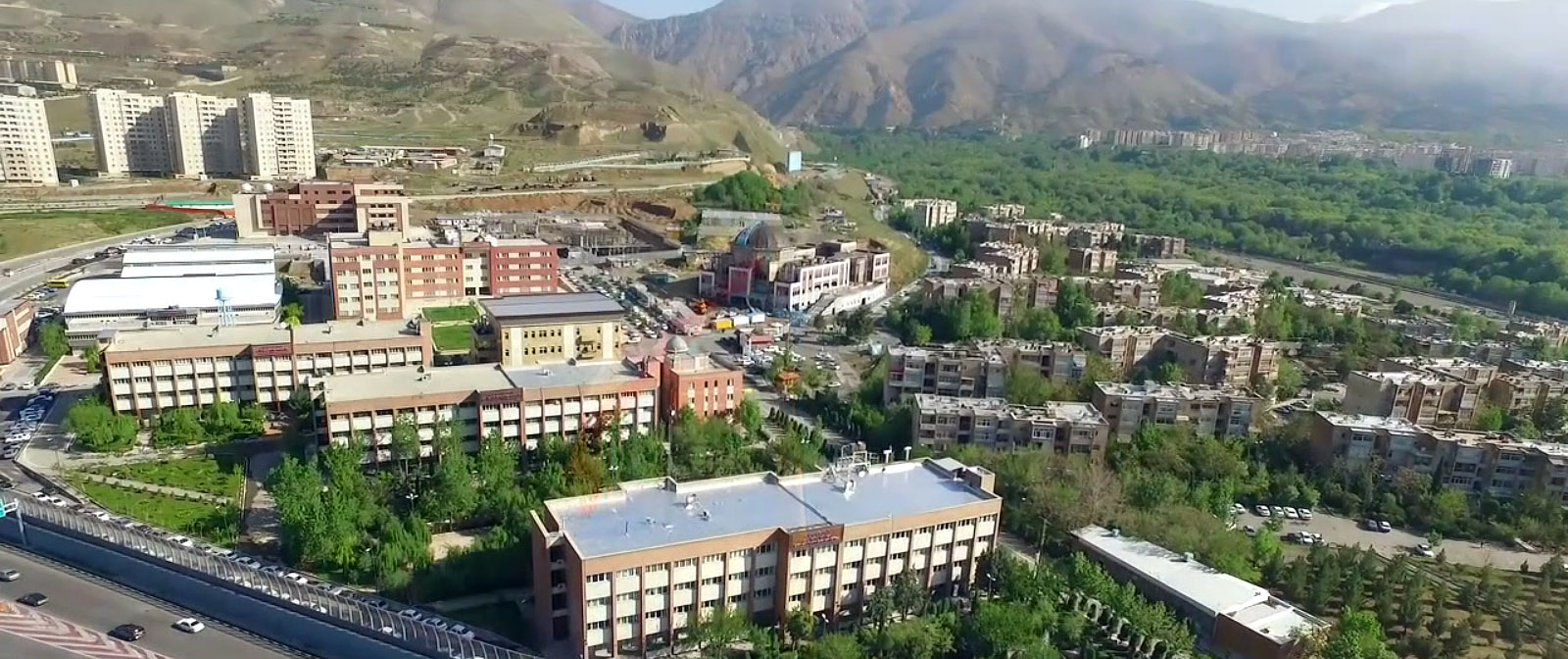
- Allameh Tabatabaei University main campus
- Type: Public
- Established: 1957; 69 years ago
- President: Shoja Ahmadvand
- Faculty: 522
- Students: 17,624
- Postgraduates: 2300
- Location: Tehran, Tehran, Iran
- Campus: 7 urban campuses
- Colors: Cyan
- Website: en.atu.ac.ir

Allameh Tabataba'i University (ATU; [ˌælɒːˈme tæbɒːtæbɒːˈʔiː] Persian: دانشگاه علامه طباطبائی, Dânešgâh-e Allâme Tabâtabâyi) is the largest and the leading specialized public university in humanities and social sciences in Iran. With 15,624 students and 422 full-time faculty members the university is under the supervision of Ministry of Science, Research and Technology. It is named after Allameh Tabataba'i, a prominent Iranian sage and philosopher. In 2013, the Faculty of Statistics, Mathematics, and Computer Science was established to expand its academic scope.

== History ==
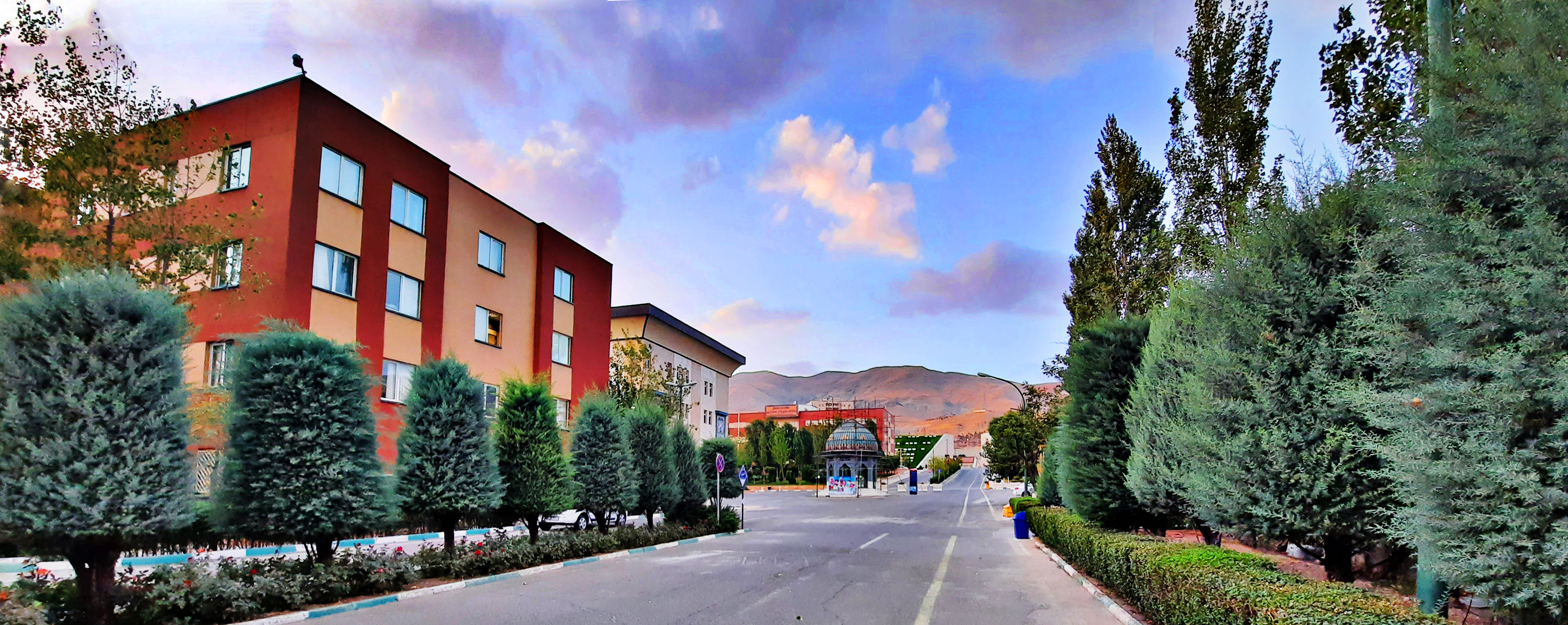
Picture from inside the campus of Allameh Tabataba'i University.

The core of this university was established in 1337 (hijri year) under the name of "Graduate School of Commerce". After the cultural revolution and the merger of the faculties that were gradually established before the Islamic Revolution, Allameh Tabataba'i University was finally established in 1984 CE.

== ATU faculties, colleges, and schools ==
ATU has the following faculties, schools, and colleges:

- Faculty of Communication Sciences
- Faculty of Statistics, Mathematics, and Computer
- Faculty of Economics
- Faculty of Law and Political Sciences
- Faculty of Management and Accounting
- Faculty of Persian Literature and Foreign Languages
- Faculty of Physical Education and Sports Sciences
- Faculty of Psychology and Education
- Faculty of Social Sciences
- Faculty of Theology and Islamic Knowledge
- ECO College of Insurance (ECOI)
- School of Graduate Studies

== Notable alumni ==
- Sayed Hassan Akhlaq; researcher and professor of philosophy
- Hossein Kazempour Ardabili; Iran's oil official and representative on OPEC's Board of Governors
- Pakhshan Azizi; human rights activist
- Alireza Dabir; world champion wrestler; a member of City Council of Tehran
- Alireza Heidari; world champion wrestler; vice-president of Wrestling Federation of IRI
- Naser Hejazi; former Iranian football player
- Mohammad Ebrahim Hemmat; the commander of Muhammad Rasulullah's army of the Islamic Republic of Iran
- Ali Kardor, managing director of the National Iranian Oil Company
- Mir Jalaleddin Kazazi; emeritus, researcher, and translator
- Mohammad Dabir Moghaddam; professor of linguistics; scientific deputy and permanent member of Iran's Academy of Persian Language and Literature
- Shahindokht Molaverdi, academic, feminist, jurist, scholar, and aide to the President of Iran.
- Poopak Niktalab; author and Literary researcher; specially children's literature
- Kourosh Safavi; professor of Linguistics
- Valiollah Seif; head of the Central Bank of the Islamic Republic of Iran

== See also ==
- List of Islamic educational institutions
