= Jameh Mosque of Babol =

Shi'ite mosque in Babol, Mazandaran, Iran

Jāmeh Mosque of Babol
- مسجد جامع بابل
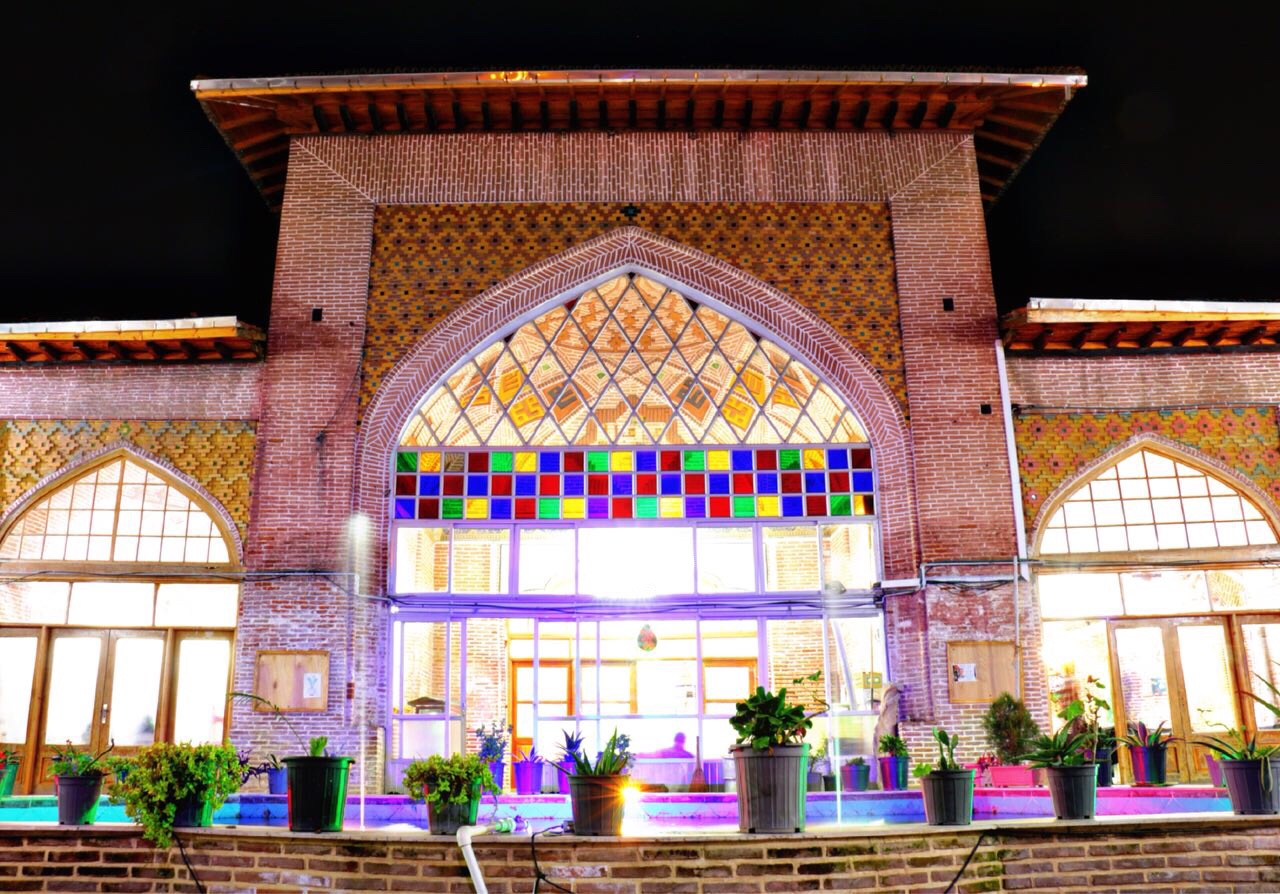
- The mosque at night in 2020

- Location of the mosque in Iran

Religion
- Affiliation: Shia Islam
- Ecclesiastical or organizational status: Friday mosque
- Status: Active

Location
- Location: Babol, Babol County, Mazandaran Province
- Country: Iran
- Interactive map of Jāmeh Mosque of Babol
- Coordinates: 36°32′35″N 52°40′47″E

Architecture
- Type: Mosque architecture
- Style: Abbasid; Safavid; Qajar
- Founder: Maziyar Ebne Qaran
- Completed: 160 AH (776/777 CE) (prime); 1695 CE; 1818 CE (renovation)

Specifications
- Dome: One (maybe more)
- Minaret: One
- Inscriptions: One (since stolen)
- Materials: Bricks; mortar; stained glass; tiles

Iran National Heritage List
- Official name: Jāmeh Mosque of Babol
- Type: Built
- Designated: 2 October 2001
- Reference no.: 4175
- Conservation organization: Cultural Heritage, Handicrafts and Tourism Organization of Iran

The Jāmeh Mosque of Babol (Persian: مسجد جامع بابل, romanized: Masjid-e Jame Babol; Arabic: جامع بابل) is a Shi'ite Friday mosque (Jāmeh), located in Babol, in the province of Mazandaran, Iran.

The mosque was added to the Iran National Heritage List on 2 October 2001, administered by the Cultural Heritage, Handicrafts and Tourism Organization of Iran.

== Overview ==
Its primary structure dates from 160 AH (776/777 CE), and was reconstructed during the Safavid era; and renovated during the Qajar era. The mosque has two portals, one to the east and the other to the west. Each give way to an eight-sided vestibule. The main nocturnal area has large and small domes, in addition to columns. There is an ancient altar in the western area, and two other newly constructed altars of tile work can be noted to the south. In the porch are verses inscribed from the works of the great poet of the times, Fath Ali Khan Saba, the poet laureate, written in 1227 AH (1811/1813 CE).

Above the western doorway were holy verses inscribed on tiles, together with 1230 AH (1814/1815 CE). The Fars News Agency reported on 23 October 2022 that this historic inscription plaque was stolen; and, according to CCTV cameras, the theft was attributed to "rioters" (a term used by the Iranian government to describe protesters).

== Gallery ==
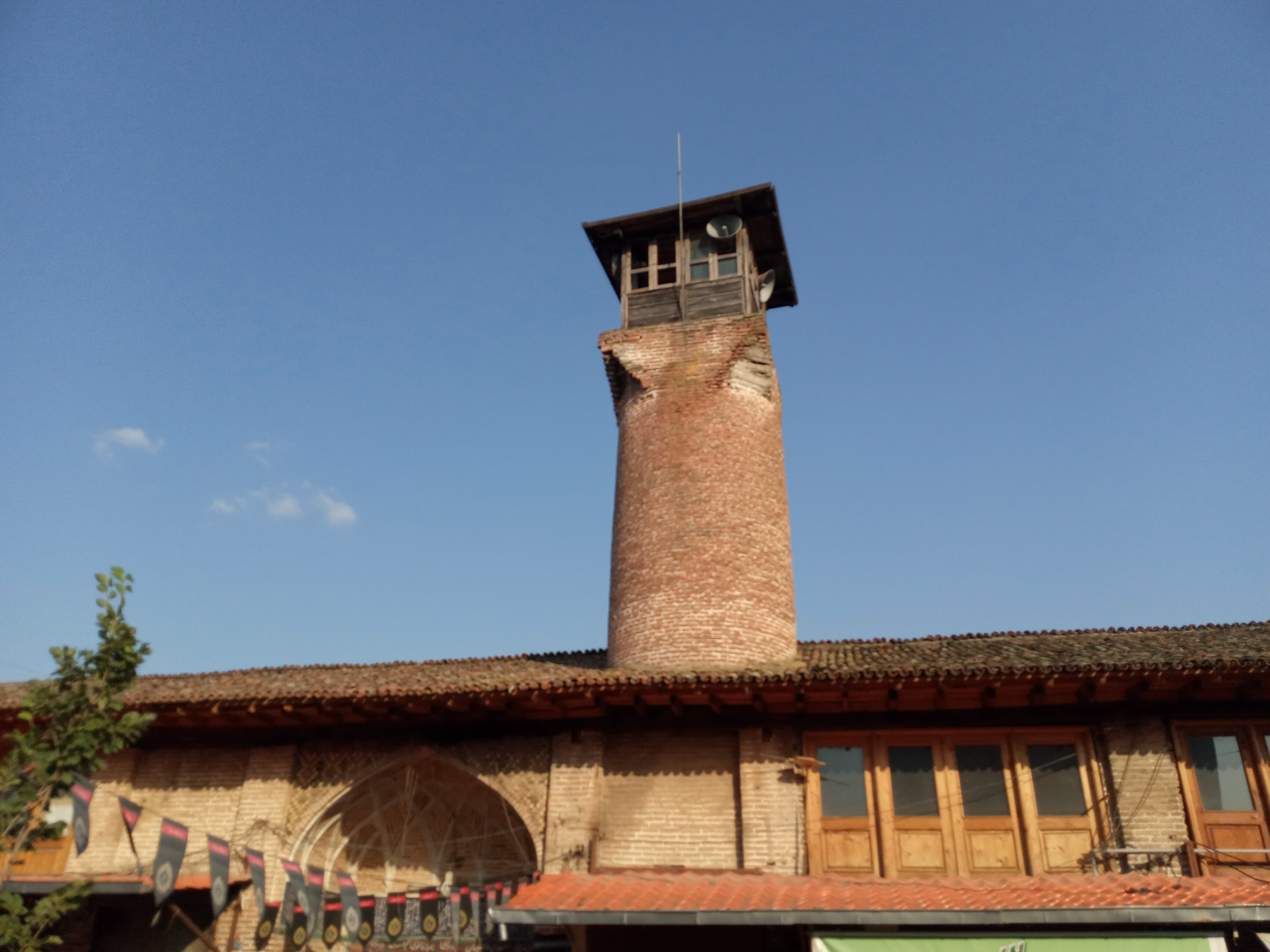
The minaret in 2020

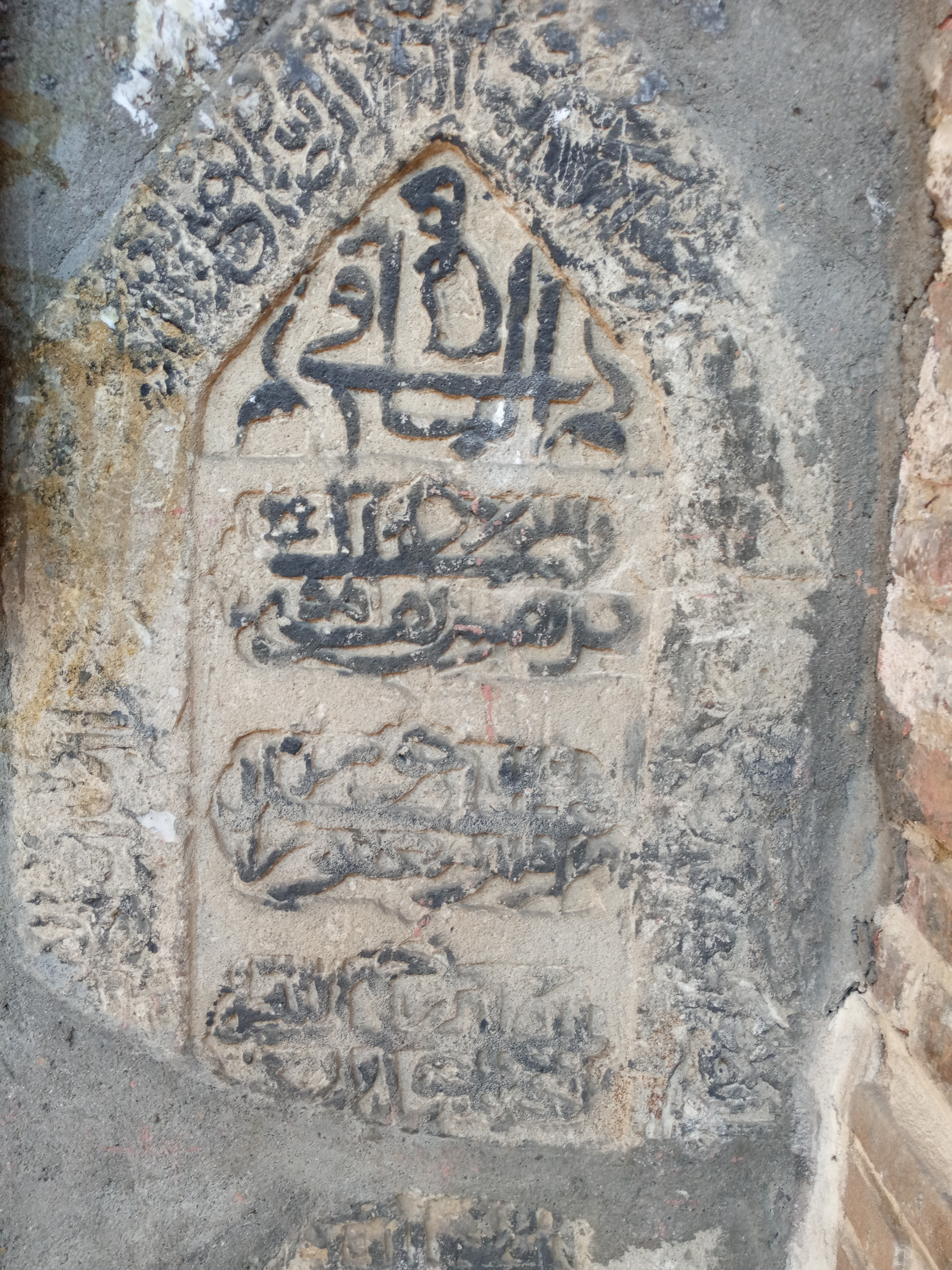
Inscription on the front door in 2020, prior to its theft

== See also ==
- Shia Islam in Iran
- List of mosques in Iran
