= Roknodin Javadi =

Iranian business executive (born 1957)

- Born: 1957 (age 68–69); Abhar, Iran
- Education: Electronic Engineering
- Alma mater: Abadan Petroleum University
- Occupations: former CEO of National Iranian Oil Company

Roknodin Javadi (Persian: رکن‌الدین جوادی; born 1957) is an Iranian politician and business executive.

He is a former CEO of National Iranian Oil Company, former Deputy oil minister of iran and the former chairman of National Iranian South Oil Company.

Javadi served as managing director of National Iranian Gas Export Company (NIGEC) during ex-president Mohammad Khatami`s administration, who signed Crescent Gas Contract on behalf of the Iran's Oil Ministry.

In September 2013 Javadi was appointed as the managing director and CEO of National Iranian Oil Company (NIOC) and as deputy oil minister by Iran's oil minister Bijan Namdar Zanganeh. He succeeded former NIOC CEO Ahmad Ghalebani.

Javadi served as NIOC’s CEO until he resigned in June 2016. He was succeeded by Ali Kardor. Javadi also served as vice-chairman of the board. Following his work as CEO for NIOC Javadi began serving as the Ministry of Petroleum's deputy managing director for monitoring hydrocarbon resources. He was regularly being appeared on national and international media.
