= Anahita Hemmati =

Iranian actress (born 1973)

- آناهیتا همتی
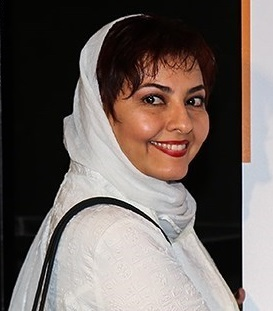
- Born: July 23, 1973 (age 52); Tehran, Iran
- Occupations: TV and cinema actress
- Years active: 1993–present
- Spouse(s): Alexander Jriosa (m. 2004; div. 2007) Ali Baghzari (m. 2023)

Anahita Hemmati (Persian: آناهیتا همتی; born July 23, 1973) is an Iranian actress.

== Career ==
Upon finishing high school, Hemmati attended drama classes and made her stage debut with the play Tanbour Players, by Hadi Marzban, in 1995.

Hemmati has performed in the series Khazra High School (1996), Sheriff (2005), Sweet and Sour (2007), Homeless (2004), and The Colonel's Garden (2013).

She has also acted in the movies Love is Not Enough (1998), A Girl Named Tondar (2000), Wooden Ladder (2001), How Much You Want to Cry? (2005), Excited Hearts (2002) and A Pocket Full of Money (2009).
