= Farhad Dejpasand =

Iranian politician

- فرهاد دژپسند
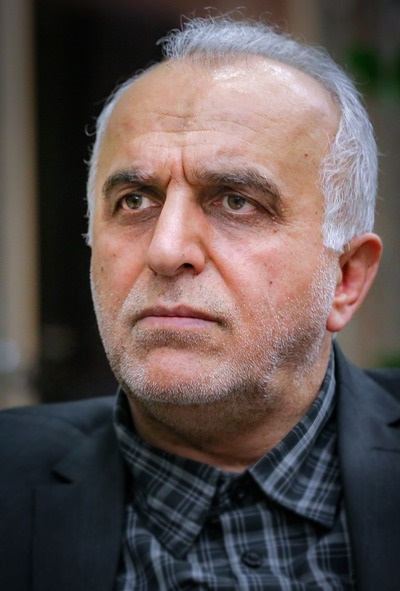

Minister of Economic Affairs and Finance
- In office 27 October 2018 – 25 August 2021
- President: Hassan Rouhani
- Preceded by: Masoud Karbasian
- Succeeded by: Ehsan Khandozi

Personal details
- Born: 1962 (age 63–64) Rostamkola, Iran
- Party: Independent
- Education: Shahid Beheshti University

Farhad Dejpasand (Persian: فرهاد دژپسند; born 1962 in Rostamkola, is a politician, economist and former Minister of Economy of Iran.
