= 1918 in Iran =

- Decades
- See also: Other events of 1918; Years in Iran

The following lists events that happened during 1918 in Qajar era.

== Incumbents ==
- Monarch: Ahmad Shah Qajar
- Prime Minister: Abdol Majid Mirza (until January 16), Mostowfi ol-Mamalek (January 16 – May 1), Najaf-Qoli Khan Bakhtiari (May 1 – August 8), Vosugh od-Dowleh (starting August 8)

== Events ==
- April 16 – Battle of Ushno.
- Salmas massacre.

== Births ==
- April 23 – Hamid Mirza, Qajar prince.
- April 30 – Mohammad Moin, Iranian academic.
- May 9 – Ahmad Mirfendereski, Persian diplomat and politician.
- September 22 – Jafar Salmasi, Iranian weightlifter.
- September 22 – Mahmoud Namjoo, Iranian weightlifter.
- September 26 – Mohammad-Ali Molavi, Iranian economist.
- October 2 – Hasan Nazih, Iranian politician.
- November 1 – Abbas Gharabaghi, Persian military officer.
- November 6 – Eprime Eshag, economist.
- ? – Amir Khosrow Afshar, Persian diplomat and politician.
- ? – Fereydun Ebrahimi, Prosecutor General of the National Government of Azerbaijan, victim of repression..
- ? – Gholam Ali Oveissi, Iranian Army general.
- ? – Hossein Fatemi, Iranian politician.
- ? – Jafar Shahidi, Iranian scholar.
- ? – Javad Hamidi, Iranian artist.
- ? – Joseph Vaezian, Iranian film producer, artist and film director.
- ? – Mehdi Samii, Iranian politician, economist and accountant.
- ? – Mohammad Baheri, Iranian politician.
- ? – Qolamhossein Bigjekhani, Iranian musician.

== Deaths ==
- April 20 – Ahmad Moshir al-Saltaneh, Iranian politician and calligrapher.
- June 23 – Mohammad-Ali Ala ol-Saltaneh, Iranian politician.
- July 2 – Mass'oud Mirza Zell-e Soltan, Persian prince and the eldest son of Naser al-Din Shah Qajar.
- ? – Edeb, Kurdish poet.
- ? – Mirza Abdollah, Iranian musician.
