= Khatam University =

Private university in Tehran, Iran

- دانشگاه خاتم
- Type: Private (Non-profit)
- Established: February 8, 1997
- Accreditation: Ministry of Science, Research and Technology (MSRT)
- President: Majid Ghassemi
- Total staff: 600
- Students: 2,200
- Postgraduates: 1500
- Location: Tehran, Iran
- Campus: Urban
- Website: https://khatam.ac.ir/en

Khatam University (Persian: دانشگاه خاتم, romanized: Dāneshgāh-e Khātam) is a private, non-profit higher education institution based in Tehran, Iran. Founded as the Khatam Non-Governmental Higher Education Institute, the institution awards undergraduate, graduate and doctoral degrees across fields including engineering, sciences, medicine, management and the humanities. The university operates under the full accreditation of Iran’s Ministry of Science, Research and Technology and emphasises applied research, industry collaboration and professional training.

== History ==
Khatam University traces its origins to a privately organised higher education institute which began admitting graduate students in the biological sciences in the 1990s. Over subsequent decades the institute expanded both its academic offerings and institutional structure, reorganising into the current university and establishing faculties, research centres and conference programmes. The university’s governance has included a board of trustees made up of prominent academics, physicians and industry figures.

== Campus and facilities ==
The university’s principal campus is located in the Vanak neighbourhood of Tehran and includes teaching buildings, research laboratories, a central library, conference facilities and services for students and staff. Khatam hosts national and international conferences and maintains laboratories and applied research units intended to facilitate technology transfer and industry partnerships.

== Academics ==
Khatam University offers programmes at bachelor’s, master’s and doctoral levels across multiple schools and departments, including engineering, computer science, life sciences, architecture, and management. Curricula combine coursework, research projects and internships; postgraduate study emphasises research skills and applied problem solving. The university also runs continuing education and professional development courses.

== Research and rankings ==
Khatam University is listed in international research-output trackers and institutional profiles. The university appears in the Nature Index institutional outputs for Iran, which records its publications in high-quality journals, and is profiled by Times Higher Education. These profiles indicate growing research output in areas such as the physical sciences and engineering.

== Student life ==
Students at Khatam participate in academic societies, technical teams, cultural groups and entrepreneurship activities. The university organises seminars, conferences, student project exhibitions and career services intended to connect graduates with national employers and industry partners.

== International relations ==
Although primarily serving Iran’s domestic student body, Khatam University engages in international research collaborations, visiting scholar programmes and conference exchanges. The institution maintains an international profile through research indexing and participation in regional academic networks.

== Notable people ==
- Majid Ghassemi — Founder and President of Khatam University; Iranian banker and executive, former Governor of the Central Bank of Iran.
- Ali Akbar Salehi — Founding trustee; Iranian academic and diplomat, former President of the Atomic Energy Organization of Iran and former Minister of Foreign Affairs.
- Saeed Sohrabpour — Member of the founding board of trustees; prominent Iranian engineer and former Chancellor of Sharif University of Technology.
- Abbas Anvari — Member of the founding board; Iranian physicist and former Chancellor of Sharif University of Technology.
- Reza Malekzadeh — Member of the founding board; Iranian medical scientist and former Minister of Health.
- Iradj Fazel — Member of the founding board; Iranian surgeon and academic, former Minister of Health.
- Mostafa Mohaghegh Damad — Member of the founding board; jurist and scholar who has served in academic and advisory roles.

== See also ==
- Higher education in Iran
- List of universities in Iran
