= Ali Reza =

Ali Reza (also spelled Alireza or Ali-Reza) is a given name popular among Iranians, Bengalis, Turks, and Albanians that refers to the Shia imams Ali and Ali al-Ridha..

== People ==
=== Ali Reza ===
- Ali Reza Pahlavi (born 1966), member of the Pahlavi dynasty
- Ali Reza (actor) (born 1985), Indian model and actor
- Ali Reza Asahi (1973–2025), Afghan bodybuilder
- Ali-Reza Asgari (born 1952), Iranian general
- Ali Reza Eftekhari (born 1958), Iranian pop singer
- Ali Reza Nobari (born 1947), Iranian economist
- Ali Reza Pahlavi (1922–1954), member of the Pahlavi dynasty
- Ali Reza Raju (1945–2016), Bangladeshi politician
- Md. Ali Reza (born 1964), Bangladeshi High Court justice

=== Ali Rıza ===
- Ali Rıza Binboğa (born 1950), Turkish singer
- Ali Rıza Efendi (1839–1888), father of Mustafa Kemal Atatürk
- Ali Rıza Pasha (1860–1932), one of the last grand viziers of the Ottoman Empire
- Ali Rıza Pasha (governor of Baghdad), Ottoman general and Vali of Ottoman Baghdad
- Ali Rıza Seyfi (1879–1958), Turkish novelist, historian and poet

=== Alireza ===
- Alireza Afshar (1951–2025), Iranian military officer
- Alireza Akbarpour (born 1973), Iranian footballer
- Alireza Arafi (born 1959), Iranian Shia cleric
- Alireza Assar (born 1970), Iranian pop singer
- Alireza Bakht (born 1970), Iranian para taekwondo practitioner
- Alireza Beiranvand (born 1992), Iranian footballer
- Alireza Firouzja (born 2003), French-Iranian chess grandmaster
- Alireza Ghorbani (born 1972), Iranian musician
- Alireza Jafarzadeh, Iranian activist
- Alireza Jahanbakhsh (born 1993), Iranian footballer
- Alireza Khamseh (born 1953), Iranian actor
- Alireza Mansourian (born 1971), Iranian footballer
- Alireza Marandi (born 1939), Iranian physician and politician
- Alireza Mashayekhi (born 1940), Iranian musician
- Alireza Nassiri (weightlifter) (born 2005), Iranian weightlifter
- Alireza Nourizadeh (born 1949), Iranian scholar and journalist
- Alireza Rezaei (born 1976), Iranian wrestler
- Alireza Sagharchi (born 1959), British-Iranian architect
- Alireza Talischi (born 1985), Iranian pop singer
- Alireza Tangsiri (1962–2026), Iranian naval officer
- Alireza Vahedi Nikbakht (born 1980), Iranian footballer

=== Ali Riza ===
- Ali Riza Dede (1876 or 1882–1944), Albanian dedebaba of the Bektashi Order
