= Dotin =

Iranian tech company

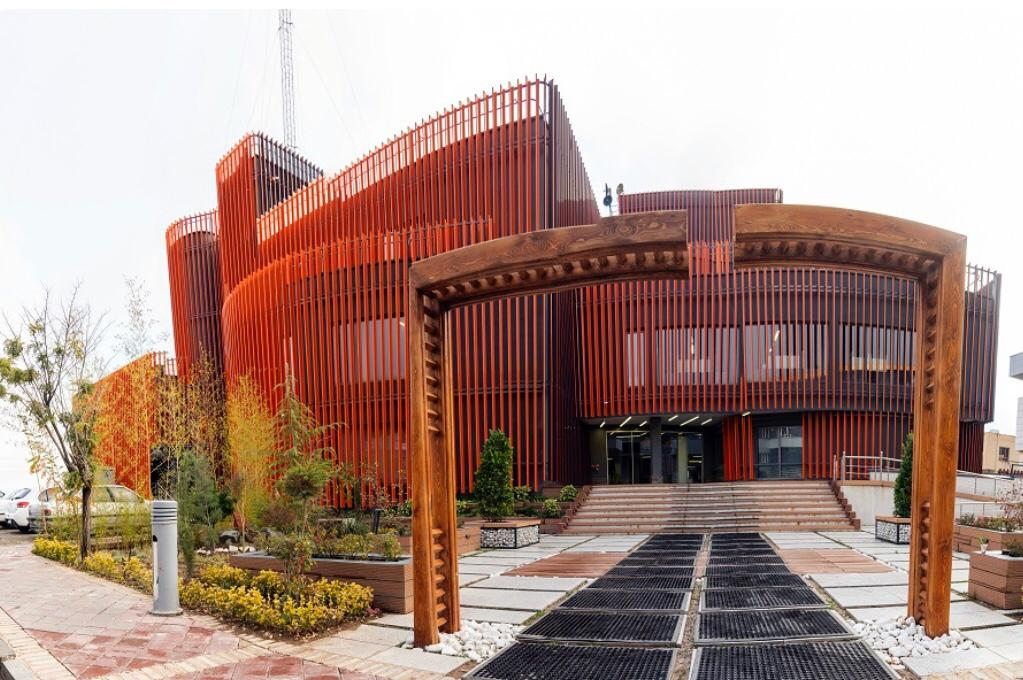
- Dotin Company in Pardis Science and Technology Park in Tehran
- Trade name: Datis Arian Qeshm
- Founded: 2005, Tehran, Iran
- Headquarters: Tehran, Iran
- Services: IT
- Owner: Fanap, Pasargad Bank
- Members: 1100
- Website: www.dotin.ir

Dotin (full name Datis Arian Qeshm) is an Iranian company that operates in the fields of information technology, software production, financial services and security. The company was founded in 2005 and is owned by the Fanap Holding Company associated with Pasargad Financial Group.
