= Abdol Majid Majidi =

Iranian politician (1928–2014)

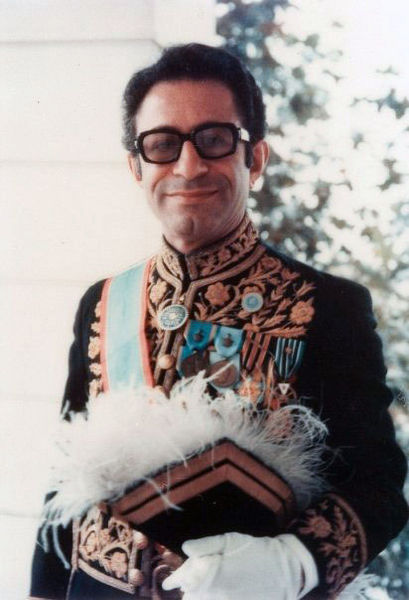

Minister of State
- In office 1973–1977
- Monarch: Mohammad Reza Pahlavi
- Prime Minister: Amir Abbas Hoveyda

Minister of Labor and Social Affairs
- In office 1968–1973
- Monarch: Mohammad Reza Pahlavi
- Prime Minister: Amir Abbas Hoveyda

Minister of Agricultural Products and Consumer Affairs
- In office 1967–1968
- Monarch: Mohammad Reza Pahlavi
- Prime Minister: Amir Abbas Hoveyda

Personal details
- Born: 11 January 1929 Tehran, Imperial State of Persia
- Died: 23 February 2014 (aged 85) San Francisco, USA
- Resting place: Père Lachaise Cemetery, Paris, France
- Party: Rastakhiz Party
- Spouse: Monir Vakili (m. 1951; died 1983)
- Children: 2
- Education: University of Tehran; University of Paris

Abdol Majid Majidi (Persian: عبدالمجید مجیدی, 1929–2014) was an Iranian politician who held several cabinet and public posts during the reign of Shah Mohammad Reza Pahlavi. He went into exile following the regime change in Iran in 1979 and settled in Paris.

== Early life and education ==
Majidi was born in Tehran on 11 January 1929. His father was a lawyer, and Majidi was the second of his family's seven children.

Majidi was a graduate of the University of Tehran where he received a law degree in 1950. He obtained his PhD in law from the University of Paris and also, attended economy program of the Harvard University's graduate school.

== Career ==
Majidi was a member of the Rastakhiz Party. He held the following posts: deputy prime minister, minister of agricultural products and consumer affairs in the period between 1967 and 1968 and minister of labor and social affairs from 1968 to 1973. He was appointed minister of state and director of the Plan and Budget Organization on 12 January 1973. He replaced Khodadad Mirza Farman Farmaian as director of the Plan and Budget Organization. Majidi remained in both posts until 1977. His successor as director of the Plan and Budget Organization was Mohammad Yeganeh. Majidi served in these posts during the premiership of Amir Abbas Hoveyda.

As the Shah of Iran established a one-party state, Majidi assumed leadership of the Rastakhiz Party's progressive faction. Recognizing the untapped potential of Iran's constitution, he proposed a reform plan to enhance the effectiveness of its three branches: the executive, legislative, and judiciary. Majidi argued that a truly representative assembly, rather than an appointed one, was essential for the nation to express its will, countering the Shah's assertion that the constitution was a joint mandate of himself and the nation.

Majidi was also the secretary general of the Iranian Red Cross and director of Queen Farah Foundation between 1977 and 1979.

== Later years, personal life and death ==
Majidi was arrested by the martial authorities in January 1979. On 11 February 1979 when the Iranian army announced its neutrality towards the Islamic forces, many prisoners, including Majidi, escaped from the jail. On 26 May 1979 he left Iran after hiding in his relatives' houses and settled in Paris, France, where his wife, Monir Vakili, had been living. They married in 1951, and Monir Vakili was an opera singer and TV personality in Pahlavi Iran. Vakili died in a traffic collision in Belgium on 28 February 1983. They had two daughters, Scheherzade and Djamileh.

Majidi died in San Francisco, USA, on 23 February 2014. He was buried in Père Lachaise Cemetery in Paris next to his wife on 28 March 2014.

=== Work ===
Majidi published various books, including his memoirs dated 1998.
