= Pasargad insurance company =

Pasargad Insurance Company
- Type: Public company TSE: BIPZ1; ISIN: IRO3BIPZ0001
- Industry: Insurance
- Founded: 2007
- Founder: Bank Pasargad
- Headquarters: Tehran, Iran
- Products: life and non-life insurance services
- Website: pasargadinsurance.ir

The Pasargad Insurance Company (Persian: شرکت بیمه پاسارگاد) is an Iranian insurance company established by the Pasargad Financial Group to provide life and non-life insurance services. It has been operating since 2008 and has the most number of agencies in Iran. It has some of Iran's best-selling life insurance policies.

== History ==
The company was registered by Pasargad Bank in the Register of Companies and Non-Commercial Institutions in Tehran on February 7, 2007. It was registered under number 290070, with a capital of 450 billion Iranian rials, of which 50% was paid. On February 18, 2007, it obtained a license from the Central Insurance of the Islamic Republic of Iran to operate in all areas of insurance under number 34605. On February 20, 2007, it began trading by issuing its first insurance policy.

== Shareholders ==
Pasargad Insurance, trading under the symbol "BIPZ1", is listed on the Tehran Stock Exchange. The company has 15 principal shareholders: Pasargad Bank Company, Pars Hafez Development Management Company, Nezam Avaran Shayesteh Company, Nik Andishan Soroush Fajr Company, Nasim Tejarat Farda Company, West Iranian Trade and Development Company, Armaghan Tejarat Paydar Company, Mehr Afarinan Vandad Trade and Development Company, Nezam Avaran Pouya Iranian Company, Danesh Gostaran Ati Saz Pouya Company, Mosalla Nejad Cultural Foundation Institute, Andisheh Sazan Besaman Vandad Company, other legal shareholders (81 companies) and individual shareholders (19,556 individuals).

== Statistics ==
The company has 2,200 active agents and 8,400 life insurance sales representatives in 87 branches throughout Iran with more than 15 regional departments.

== See also ==
- Pasargad Bank
- Banking and insurance in Iran
