= Valiollah Seif =

- ولی‌الله سیف
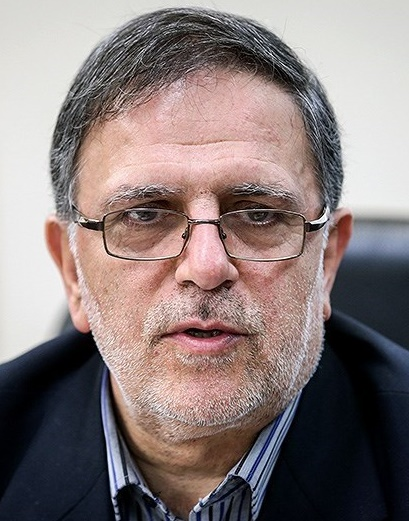

Governor of the Central Bank of Iran
- In office 2 September 2013 – 25 July 2018
- Appointed by: Hassan Rouhani
- Preceded by: Mahmoud Bahmani
- Succeeded by: Abdolnaser Hemmati

Personal details
- Born: 1 January 1952 (age 74) Hamedan, Iran
- Education: N.I.O.C. school of Accounting and Finance; Allameh Tabatabaei University

Valiollah Seif (Persian: ولی‌الله سیف, born 1 January 1952) is an Iranian banker. He was the governor of the Central Bank of Iran from 2013 until 2018.

== Early life ==
Seif was born on 1 January 1952 in Nahavnd. He gained his Bsc. and Msc. from Petroleum University of Technology (former N.I.O.C. school of Accounting and Finance) and his Ph.D. from Allameh Tabatabaei University in Accounting. He is currently a professor at the Allameh University.

== Career ==
He was CEO and chairman of some private banks in Iran, Mellat Bank (1990–1992), Saderat Bank (1992–1995), Sepah Bank (1995–2000), Future Bank of Bahrain (2001–2003) and Karafarin Bank (2010–2013). He was also governor of National Bank of Iran from 2003 to 2007. He was nominated as governor of Central Bank of Iran by the bank's board of directors and was accepted by President Hassan Rouhani. He was officially appointed on 2 September 2013 and quickly hinted that interest rates should rise in order to control inflation in the country. He is currently vice president of the International Chamber of Commerce.

== Honours ==
He received gold medal for Public Relations from President Mahmoud Ahmadinejad in January 2011. He was also named as one of Iran's banking industry faces persistent in 2012.

== Criticisms ==
In November 1995, following the embezzlement of 123 billion tomans ($820 million) of Bank Saderat Iran Valiollah Seif who was chairman of the bank at the time was criticized.

In 2017, Seif's reputation was hit hard when one of the five official Central Bank-approved credit institutions was unable to pay back the deposits of the customers. Unable to give reasonable explanation to the public, Valiollah Seif was soon the target for the public, media, and government officials. Protesters generally called for his execution.

In 2017 case was filed against Seif. On 13 September 2018, immediately after dismissal from service he was designated as an advisor for financial and banking affairs of Hassan Rouhani. The judiciary's spokesman, Gholamhossein Mohseni Ejei explained: he was accused of violating the law after the arrest of his deputy for currency affairs, Ahmad Araqchi (the brother of deputy Foreign Minister Abbas Araghchi).

In 2021, his case was referred to an economic court. Tehran Prosecutor General, Ali Alqasi Mehr accused Valiollah Seif of "repeatedly violating regulations" and of "dereliction of duty" Which has caused "Wasting" more than $30bn and 60 tonnes of gold reserves.

== Jail sentence ==
In 2021, he was sentenced to 10 years behind bars on corruption charges.

Government offices
Preceded by Mahmoud Bahmani	Governor of the Central Bank of Iran; 2013–2018	Succeeded by Abdolnaser Hemmati
Business positions
Unknown	Chief Executive Officer of Karafarin Bank; 2010–2013	Succeeded by Fazlollah Moazzami as Acting CEO
Unknown	Chief Executive Officer of Future Bank; 2005–2010	Succeeded by Gholam Souri
Preceded by Fereydoun Tohidi-Moghaddam as Acting CEO	Chief Executive Officer of Bank Melli Iran; 2000–2005	Succeeded by Abdolmajid Ansari
Unknown	Chief Executive Officer of Bank Sepah; 1996–2000	Unknown
Unknown	Chief Executive Officer of Bank Saderat Iran; 1992–1996	Unknown
Unknown	Chief Executive Officer of Bank Mellat; 1990–1992	Unknown
