= Abdolnaser Hemmati =

Iranian politician and economist

- عبدالناصر همتی
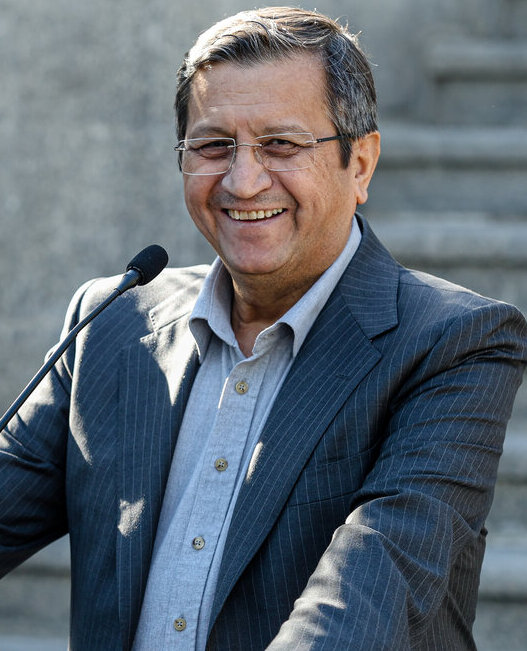
- Hemmati in 2025

Governor of the Central Bank of Iran
- Incumbent
- Assumed office 31 December 2025
- Appointed by: Masoud Pezeshkian
- Preceded by: Mohammad-Reza Farzin
- In office 25 July 2018 – 30 May 2021
- Appointed by: Hassan Rouhani
- Preceded by: Valiollah Seif
- Succeeded by: Akbar Komijani

Minister of Economic Affairs and Finance
- In office 21 August 2024 – 2 March 2025
- President: Masoud Pezeshkian
- Preceded by: Ehsan Khandozi
- Succeeded by: Rahmatollah Akrami (acting) Seyed Ali Madanizadeh

Iranian Ambassador to China
- In office 25 June 2018 – 25 July 2018
- President: Hassan Rouhani
- Preceded by: Ali-Asghar Khaji
- Succeeded by: Mohammad Keshavarzzadeh

6th Governor of the Central Insurance of Iran
- In office 16 May 2016 – 25 June 2018
- Appointed by: Hassan Rouhani
- Preceded by: Mohammad-Ebrahim Amin
- Succeeded by: Gholamreza Soleimani
- In office 30 March 1994 – 8 June 2006
- Appointed by: Akbar Hashemi Rafsanjani; Mohammad Khatami
- Preceded by: Ahmad Geranmayeh
- Succeeded by: Norouz Kahzadi

Personal details
- Born: 9 June 1956 (age 70) Kabudarahang, Iran
- Party: Executives of Construction Party
- Spouse: Sepideh Shabestari
- Children: 3
- Education: University of Tehran
- Website: Official website

Abdolnaser Hemmati (Persian: عبدالناصر همتی; born 9 June 1956) is an Iranian academic, politician, and economist who serves as governor of the Central Bank of Iran since 2025 for the second time. Hemmati served as the minister of economic and financial affairs from 2024 to 2025.

Hemmati served as the Governor of the Central Bank of Iran from 2018 to 2021 and since December 2025. He was previously vice president of the Islamic Republic of Iran Broadcasting (1989–1994), and governor of the Central Insurance of Iran (1994–2006; 2016–2018). He ran as a candidate in the 2021 Iranian presidential election, being the sole representative from the moderate wing of Iranian politicians, and was placed third overall in the results.

He registered to run in the 2024 election, but was rejected by the Guardian Council.

== Presidential candidacy ==
Abdol Nasser Hemmati entered the field in the 2024 presidential elections with the slogan "Economy for the People". He presented plans to curb inflation, improve people's livelihoods, and attract foreign investment. Hemmati emphasized that Iran's economy should move away from dependence on oil and move toward income diversification. However, his candidacy was rejected by the Guardian Council.

== Economy Minister ==
Hemmati joined the cabinet of President Masoud Pezeshkian as economy minister in 2024. On 2 March 2025, he was removed from office after 182 of 273 MPs in the Islamic Consultative Assembly voted for his impeachment, citing the country's ongoing economic crisis that saw high inflation and the devaluation of the Iranian rial.

== Central Bank Governor ==
Hemmati served as governor of the Central Bank of Iran twice, the latest being in 2025.

In December 2025, Hemmati was appointed governor of the Central Bank of Iran, replacing Mohammad-Reza Farzin, who resigned during the 2025–2026 Iranian protests amid a sharp fall in the rial and rising inflation.

Government offices
Preceded by Ahmad Geranmayeh	Governor of the Central Insurance of Iran; 1994–2006; 2016–2018	Succeeded by Norouz Kahzadi
Preceded by Mohammad-Ebrahim Amin	Governor of the Central Insurance of Iran; 1994–2006; 2016–2018	Succeeded by Gholamreza Soleimani
Preceded by Valiollah Seif	Governor of the Central Bank of Iran; 2018–2021	Succeeded by Akbar Komijani
Business positions
Preceded by Reza Shiva	Chief Executive Officer of Sina Bank; 2006–2013	Succeeded by Kourosh Parvizian
Preceded by Farshad Heidari	Chief Executive Officer of Bank Melli Iran; 2013–2016	Succeeded by Mohammad Reza Hosseinzadeh
Diplomatic posts
Preceded by Ali-Asghar Khaji	Ambassador of Iran to the China; 2018	Succeeded by Mohammad Keshavarzzadeh
