= N.I.O.C. school of Accounting and Finance =

Tehran Faculty of Petroleum
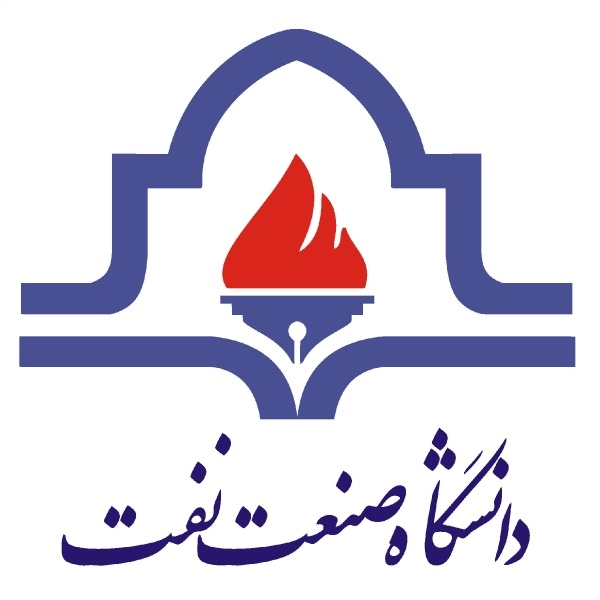
- Seal of the Petroleum University of Technology
- Former names: Tehran Faculty of Petroleum (دانشکده نفت تهران)
- Type: Public Business School
- Established: 1958
- Affiliations: Professional Accountants Centre For Training (PACT); ACCA; CIMA; Iranian Institute of Certified Accountants; FUIW; IAU; TWAS
- President: Prof. Riyaz Kharat
- Location: Tehran, Iran
- Campus: Urban
- Nickname: PUT
- Website: www.put.ac.ir

Faculty of Accounting and Financial Sciences of Petroleum University of Technology, National Iranian Oil Company is the oldest center of higher education in accounting in Iran. The Faculty was established in 1958, seven years after the nationalization of the oil industry, by the scholars such Prof. Hassan Sajjadi Nejad and Dr. Esmail Erfani with the support of Abdullah Entezam, then CEO of National Iranian Oil Company. The school started with 61 students from the Higher Institute of Accounting and Compliance with National Iranian Oil Company personnel launches.

== History ==
- Founded in 1958, seven years after the nationalization of the oil industry, by the scholars such Prof. Hassan Sadjadi Nejad, the father of accounting in Iran and Dr. Esmail Erfani with the support of Abdullah Entezam, then CEO of National Iranian Oil Company, by the name of "the Higher School of Accounting".
- In 1962, the students of the first class of Accounting were graduated.
- In 1972 the Higher School of Accounting renamed to "School of Accounting and Financial Sciences of National Iranian Oil Company".
- After the Iranian Revolution of 1979, merged with the Allameh Tabatabai University, but in 1988 started its career under the name of "School of Accounting and Financial Sciences of the National Iranian Oil Company".
- In 1989 the School of Accounting and Finance merged with the Petroleum University of Technology and now is known as the Tehran Faculty of Accounting, Economics, and Management (N.I.O.C. school of Accounting and Finance).

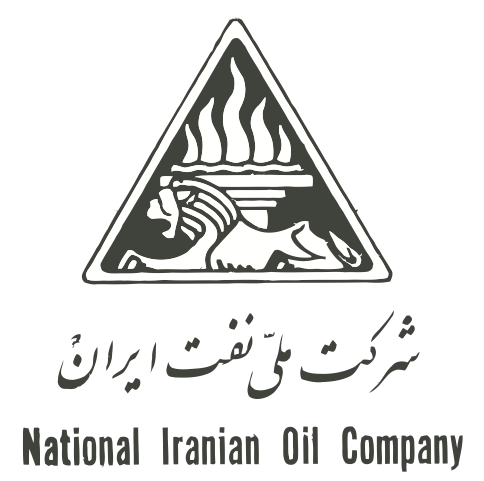
former N.I.O.C. school of Accounting and Finance logo

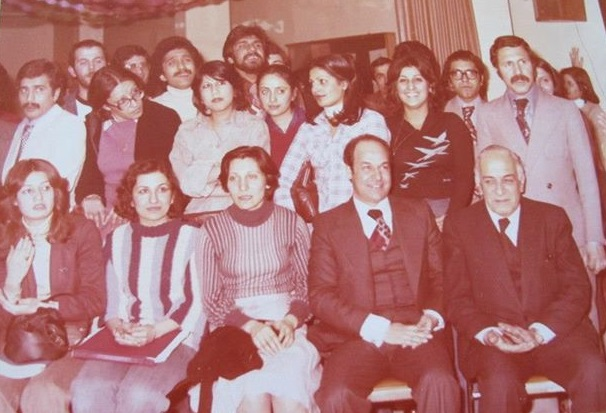
Prof. Sajadinejad and students in 1975

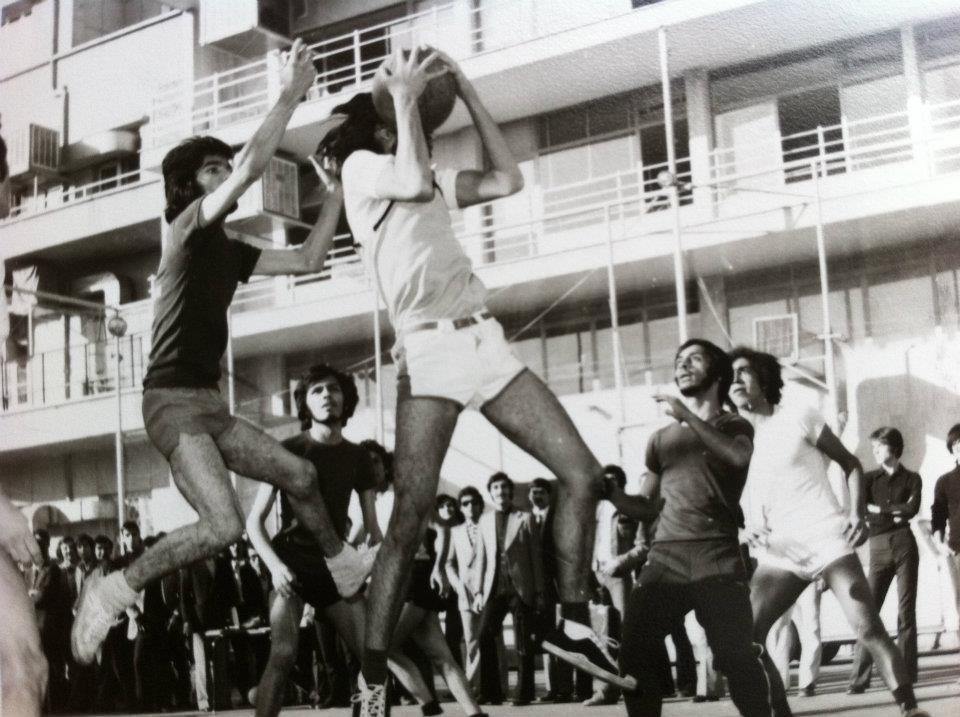
school basketball league, 1979

== َAcademics ==
=== َDepartments ===
The facility has four Departments:

- Department of Accounting and Finance
- Department of Energy Economics and Management
- Department of Law
- Department of Industrial Engineering

=== Programs ===
The school offers the following programs:

- BSc. of Accounting
- BSc. of management in Business
- BSc. of Industrial Management
- MSc. of finance (Track; Corporate Finance)
- MSc. of Managerial Accounting
- MSc. of Law
- MSc. of Energy Economics
- MSc. of Reservoir Management
- MSc. of Industrial Engineering (Track; Production Management)

== Former Presidents ==
Chancellor	Tenure	Alma mater	Speciality
Dr. Esmail Erfani	1958-?	(United Kingdom) London School of Economics	Accounting
Prof. Hassan Sadjadi Nejad	1969-1979	(United Kingdom) ICAEW	Accounting
Reza Mostajeran	1988-1994	(Iran) N.I.O.C. school of Accounting and Finance	Accounting
Dr. Fereydoon Ahrabi	1994-?	(United States) Stanford University	Statistics
Dr. Abolghasem Emamzadeh	?-2004	(United Kingdom) University of Wales	Mathematics
Dr. Karim Salahshour	2004–2011	(United Kingdom) University of Manchester	Electronic Engineering
Dr. Nabi Hashemi	2011–2014	(United Kingdom) Imperial College London	Petroleum Engineering
Prof. Riyaz Kharat	2014–current	(United States) University of Kansas	Chemical Engineering

== Academic background ==
Since its establishment, Petroleum School of Accounting always had admitted the top students of National Wide University Entrance Examinations (Konkur). Additionally, according to the results of MS Entrance Examinations PUT students are the best among other universities like Sharif University of Technology and Amirkabir University of Technology and N.I.O.C. school of Accounting and Finance has major contribution in obtaining this honor.

== Notable alumni ==
- Valiollah Seif, Governor of Central Bank of the Islamic Republic of Iran
- Dr. Ali M. Sedaghat, Professor of Sellinger School of Business in loyola University Maryland
- Dr. Hossein B. Kazemi, Michael & Cheryl Philipp Professor of Finance, University of Massachusetts Amherst
- Prof. Massood Saffarian, Professor of Accounting Rogers State University
- Dr. Mahnaz Mahdavi, Ann F. Kaplan Director & Professor of Economics, Smith College
- Gholamreza Salami, Iranian Accounting leader
- Allahverdi Rajaei Salmasi, first secretary of Iran Exchange Market
- Abolghasem Fakharian, chairman of Iranian Institute of Certified Accountants
