= Mohammad-Javad Vahaji =

Iranian economist

- محمدجواد وهاجی

Governor of the Central Bank of Iran Acting
- In office 23 March 2003 – 3 May 2003
- Preceded by: Mohsen Nourbakhsh
- Succeeded by: Ebrahim Sheibani

Mohammad-Javad Vahaji (Persian: محمدجواد وهاجی) is an Iranian economist who served as the deputy governor of the Central Bank of Iran for years. Vahaji was the bank's acting governor in 2003.

Government offices
Preceded by Mohsen Nourbakhsh as Governor	Acting Governor of the Central Bank of Iran; 2003	Succeeded by Ebrahim Sheibani as Governor
Unknown	Deputy Governor of the Central Bank of Iran; 1994–2007	Succeeded by Hossein Qazavi
