= Mohsen Nourbakhsh =

Iranian economist

Seyyed Mohsen Nourbakhsh
- محسن نوربخش

Governor of the Central Bank of Iran
- In office 1994 – 23 March 2003
- Appointed by: Mohammad Khatami; Akbar Hashemi Rafsanjani
- Deputy: Mohammad-Javad Vahaji
- Preceded by: Mohammad Hossein Adeli
- Succeeded by: Ebrahim Sheibani
- In office 1981–1986
- Appointed by: Mir-Hossein Mousavi
- Preceded by: Alireza Nobari
- Succeeded by: Majid Ghassemi

Vice President of Iran for Economic Affairs
- In office 12 August 1993 – 14 September 1994
- President: Akbar Hashemi Rafsanjani

Minister of Economy and Financial Affairs
- In office 1989–1993
- President: Akbar Hashemi Rafsanjani
- Preceded by: Mohammad-Javad Irvani
- Succeeded by: Morteza Mohammadkhan

Personal details
- Born: 18 May 1948 Isfahan, Iran
- Died: 23 March 2003 (aged 54) Noshahr, Iran
- Party: Executives of Construction Party

Mohsen Nourbakhsh (Persian: محسن نوربخش; 18 May 1948 – 23 March 2003) was an Iranian economist, most known as governor of the Central Bank of Iran and the former minister of finance of Iran. Nourbakhsh had pro-market views.

== Personal life and education ==
Born in isfahan, Nourbakhsh received a bachelor's degree from the University of Tehran in economics, and a Master of Arts and PhD from the University of California, Davis in econometrics.

== Career ==
Shortly after the Iranian Revolution, Nourbakhsh's nomination for finance minister was rejected by president Abolhassan Banisadr. Nourbakhsh was then named deputy finance minister and held that office until 1981.

In 1988, Nourbakhsh became a member of the Majlis and a representative for Tehran. Next he was nominated for the economy and finance minister to the government of the then-president Akbar Hashemi Rafsanjani in 1989. He was approved by the Majlis with 195 for and 43 against votes. In the Summer of 1993, he was forced by the Majlis to resign.

Nourbakhsh was then appointed the governor of the Central Bank of Iran by president Akbar Hashemi Rafsanjani in 1994 and he was in office until his death in 2003. In 1999 president Mohammad Khatami reappoints him as the governor. During the first term of president Mohammad Khatami, Hossein Namazi was the minister of economy and finance. There was rivalry between Nourbakhsh and Namazi in regard to the economic policy.

== Death ==
Nourbakhsh died of a heart attack on 23 March 2003. He had had a heart failure since his childhood, and had undergone a heart surgery. Mohammad Khatami, in a condolence message, praised Nourbakhsh as a "very sincere, intelligent and capable serviceman" and described his death as a "great loss."

Mohammad Javad Vahaji, deputy governor, replaced Nourbakhsh and later in the year, Ebrahim Sheibani was his successor as governor.

Government offices
Preceded by Mohammad Hossein Adeli	Governor of the Central Bank of Iran; 1994–2003	Succeeded by Mohammad-Javad Vahaji as Acting Governor
New title	Vice President of Iran for Economic Affairs; 1993–1994	Vacant Title next held by Mohammad Nahavandian
Preceded by Mohammad-Javad Irvani	Minister of Economic Affairs and Finance; 1989–1993	Succeeded by Mohammad-Javad Vahaji as Acting Minister
Preceded by Alireza Nobari	Governor of the Central Bank of Iran; 1981–1986	Succeeded by Majid Ghassemi
