= Mahmoud Bahmani =

Iranian politician and banker

Mahmood Bahmani
- محمود بهمنی
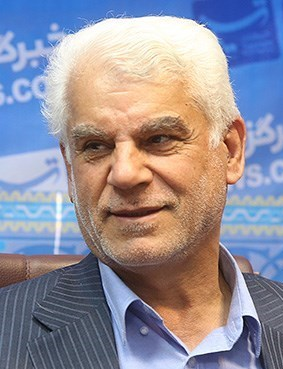

Member of the Parliament of Iran
- In office 28 May 2016 – 26 May 2020
- Preceded by: Mofid Kianinejad
- Constituency: Savojbolagh

Governor of the Central Bank of Iran
- In office 23 September 2008 – 2 September 2013
- Appointed by: Mahmoud Ahmadinejad
- Preceded by: Tahmasb Mazaheri
- Succeeded by: Valiollah Seif

Personal details
- Born: January 2, 1947 (age 79) Savojbolagh, Iran

Mahmoud Bahmani (born 2 January 1947, in Savojbolagh) is an Iranian politician and banker. He was the Governor of the Central Bank of Iran, appointed on 2 September 2008. His term as the Governor was ended on 2 September 2013 and he was succeeded by Valiollah Seif.

== Career ==
President Mahmoud Ahmadinejad appointed Bahmani to this position in September 2008 after dismissing then-Governor Tahmasb Mazaheri. Mazaheri had served in his office for about one year. The changeover took place shortly after a decision by the Central Bank of Iran to raise the interest rate on deposits, which was intended to the accelerating inflation rate. There was tension between government officials who favored an expansionary monetary policy despite the inflation and bankers who sought to contain it. Gholamreza Mesbahi-Moghadam, a key figure in the Majlis' Economic Commission, opposed Bahmani's appointment and the past dismissal of Mazaheri.

On 28 February 2009, Bahmani vocally criticized other financial institutions for the large injections into their currency supplies to fight the global economic recession. He said, "the United States of America and some major European countries, they ratified economic stimulus packages and injected thousands of billions of dollars into their economies that would increase inflation in the world in the near future". He also asked the International Monetary Fund and World Bank to give more support to developing countries. In the International Monetary Fund Spring Meeting from April 25–26 in Washington, D.C., Bahmani served as the representative of the group of 24 developing countries, which is known as 'G-24'.

In his term, Bahmani came up with differing estimates of inflation compared to Ahmadinejad, with the former giving 14 percent and the latter 25.4 percent from 2007 to 2008. After the figures became part of the political dispute between Ahmadinejad and his rival Mir Hossein Mousavi in the 2009 Presidential election, Bahmani threatened to resign if his estimations were disputed.

== See also ==
- Domestic policy of Mahmoud Ahmadinejad
- Economy of Iran

Government offices
Preceded by Tahmasb Mazaheri	Governor of the Central Bank of Iran; 2008–2013	Succeeded by Valiollah Seif
Preceded by Heshmatollah Azizian	Secretary-General of the Central Bank of Iran; 2007–2008	Succeeded by Seyyed Mahmoud Ahmadi
