= Ebrahim Sheibani =

Iranian economist

- ابراهیم شیبانی

Governor of the Central Bank of Iran
- In office 3 May 2003 – 5 September 2007
- Appointed by: Mohammad Khatami
- Deputy: Mohammad-Javad Vahaji
- Preceded by: Mohsen Nourbakhsh
- Succeeded by: Tahmasb Mazaheri

Personal details
- Born: 1948 (age 77–78) Isfahan province

Ebrahim Sheibani (Persian: ابراهیم شیبانی) is an Iranian economist who served as the 16th governor of the Central Bank of Iran from 2003 to 2007. He held the longest tenure (19 years) as a member of the board of governors in Iran's central bank history. Before his appointment as the governor, he was the deputy of economic affairs and the secretary general of the Central Bank of Iran from 1989 to 2003. In 2007, Sheibani resigned due to conflicts with President Ahmadinejad over economic policies and was appointed as the Iran's Ambassador to Austria, Slovenia, and Slovakia.

He also served as the chairman of the money and credit council, the stock exchange council, and the banks supreme council of Iran. Besides his executive positions, he has been a faculty member of the economics department at the University of Tehran since 1991.

He received his PhD and MA in economics from Indiana University Bloomington, USA and his post-graduate diploma in Statistics and National Accounting from the International Institute of Social Studies, The Hague, Netherlands. Prior to that, he earned his MA and BA in economics from the University of Tehran.

Sheibani is a published poet and has three children. His wife Zohre Afsharian, PhD in economics from Indiana University, is also a full professor of economics at Alzahra University.

Government offices
Preceded by Mohammad-Javad Vahaji as Acting Governor	Governor of the Central Bank of Iran; 2003–2007	Succeeded by Tahmasb Mazaheri
Unknown Last known title holder: Tahmasb Mazaheri	Secretary-General of the Central Bank of Iran; 1995–2003	Succeeded by Heshmatollah Azizian
