= Tahmasb Mazaheri =

Iranian politician and economist

- طهماسب مظاهری
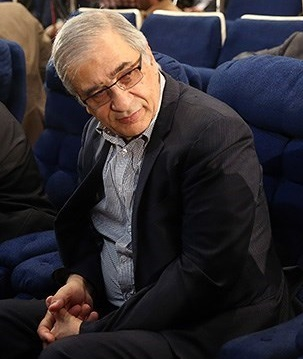

Governor of the Central Bank of Iran
- In office 5 September 2007 – 23 September 2008
- Appointed by: Mahmoud Ahmadinejad
- Preceded by: Ebrahim Sheibani
- Succeeded by: Mahmoud Bahmani

Minister of Economic Affairs and Finance
- In office 22 August 2001 – 25 April 2004
- President: Mohammad Khatami
- Preceded by: Hossein Namazi
- Succeeded by: Safdar Hosseini

Personal details
- Party: Independent
- Other political affiliations: Islamic Republican Party

Tahmasb Mazaheri Khorzeni (Persian: طهماسب مظاهری خورزنی) is an Iranian politician who served as the Minister of Economic Affairs and Finance between 2001 and 2004, and then held office as the Governor of the Central Bank of Iran from 2007 to 2008.

== Career ==
Mazaheri was appointed minister of finance to the cabinet of Mohammad Khatami in 2001. He replaced Hossein Namazi in the post. Mazaheri's term ended in April 2004 and he was succeeded by Safdar Hosseini.

Mazaheri was the governor of the Central Bank of Iran from September 2007 to September 2008. He was the shortest serving governor of Central Bank since its establishment.

He was a candidate in the 2013 presidential election. His nomination was rejected.

=== Controversy ===
In January 2013, Mazaheri was interrogated at Düsseldorf Airport by German police due to not informing the authorities in advance that he carried a 300 million Venezuelan bolívar cheque (nearly $70 million).

It was later noted that the cheque belonged to an Iranian building company to cover its expenses while building public housing in Venezuela and Mazaheri was bringing the check for the company.

== See also ==
- Hossein Samsami

Government offices
Preceded by Ebrahim Sheibani	Governor of the Central Bank of Iran; 2007–2008	Succeeded by Mahmoud Bahmani
Preceded by Hossein Namazi	Minister of Economic Affairs and Finance; 2001–2004	Succeeded by Safdar Hosseini
Unknown	Secretary-General of the Central Bank of Iran; 1991–1994	Unknown Next known title holder: Ebrahim Sheibani
