= Pasargad Arian Communication and Information Technology Co =

Iranian IT company

- Industry: Conglomerate, fintech
- Founded: 2003-2004
- Headquarters: Tehran
- Number of employees: 4000-7000

Fanap (Persian: فناپ فناوری اطلاعات و ارتباطات پاسارگاد آریان, lit. 'Aryan Pasargad Information and Communication Technology') is an Iranian information technology corporation owned by the semi-public Pasargad Bank Financial Group.

Its facial recognition source code database, used by Iranian law enforcement's FARAJA police was hacked, resulting in a 20 GB dump in August 2023.

An IPO is expected for Fanap.

== Timeline ==
In 2023, the company secured a deal to build a data center for Tebyan, which is owned by the Iranian government's Islamic Development Organization.

Fanap offered an education grant to the top 5,000 students nationally ranked in the Iranian university entrance exam to study at the private Khatam University.

In August 2023, its surveillance software product, used by the Iranian government, was leaked after a breach in a 20GB file.

== Sub Divisions ==
- Neshan maps a Pod integrated communication product
- Podro or Padro - delivery and postal mail corporation
- Behnama - facial recognition
- Fanap tech: It also runs an innovation factory in Arvand, Khuzestan.
- Abr Arvan (ArvanCloud)
- Fanap payment
- Pasargad Electronic Payment a PSP
- Zitel ISP
- Dotin a programming firm
- Baran telecom
- WePod the banking app
- Trigup accelerator (fintechtrigup)
- Fundorun crowdfunding/crowdsourcing
- health tech
- Shahreketab book shopping
