= Hossein Namazi =

Iranian economist and academic (born c. 1945)

Minister of Finance
- In office 1997–2001
- President: Mohammad Khatami
- Preceded by: Morteza Mohammadkhan
- Succeeded by: Tahmasb Mazaheri
- In office 1981–1985
- President: Abolhassan Banisadr; Mohammad-Ali Rajai; Ali Khamenei
- Preceded by: Abolhassan Banisadr
- Succeeded by: Mohammad Javad Irvani

Personal details
- Born: 1945 (age 80–81)
- Party: Independent
- Other political affiliations: Islamic Republican Party

Hossein Namazi (Persian: حسین نمازی; born c. 1945) is an Iranian economist and academic, who served in different cabinet posts.

== Early life and education ==
Namazi was born c. 1945. He received a PhD in economics in Austria.

== Career ==
Namazi is an economist and academic. He served as the minister of finance in different governments of Iran. First he served in this post from March 1981 to 1985. In 1985 he was approved for the post by the Majlis, getting 106 for votes.

He was reappointed minister of finance to the cabinet led by President Mohammad Khatami in August 1997. He succeeded Morteza Mohammadkhan in the post. When Namazi was in office, there was a rivalry between him and Mohsen Nourbakhsh, governor of Central Bank of Iran. Namazi's term ended in August 2001, and he was replaced by Tahmasb Mazaheri in the post.

=== Views ===
Namazi strongly supported social justice in Iran. He rejected the relaxing restrictions on imports of foreign goods, especially cars, and preferred restrictive labour laws.
