= Morteza Mohammadkhan =

Iranian politician and economist (1946–2022)

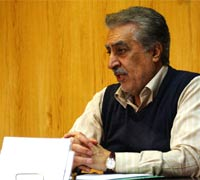

Minister of Economy and Financial Affairs
- In office 6 October 1993 – 20 August 1997
- President: Akbar Hashemi Rafsanjani
- Preceded by: Mohsen Nourbakhsh
- Succeeded by: Hossein Namazi

CEO of IRI Customs
- In office 12 January 1989 – 22 August 1993
- Preceded by: Mahmoud Ardakani
- Succeeded by: Abdolhossein Vehaji

Personal details
- Born: 1 January 1946 Tehran, Iran
- Died: 6 November 2022 (aged 76)
- Party: Executives of Construction Party; Moderation and Development Party
- Other political affiliations: Islamic Republican Party (until 1986)
- Education: Khaje Nasir University of Technology; San Jose State University; Ponna University
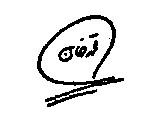
- Signature

Morteza Mohammadkhan (Persian: مرتضی محمدخان; 1 January 1946 – 5 November 2022) was an Iranian politician and economist who was Minister of Finance from 1993 to 1997 in Akbar Hashemi Rafsanjani's second cabinet.

== Early life and education ==
Mohammadkhan was born on 1 January 1946 in Tehran. He was an economics professor at Khaje Nasir University of Technology. He held a BS in Industrial Engineering from San Jose State University and also a MS in Economics from San Jose State University and a PhD from Ponna University.

== Career ==
Mohammadkhan was the founder of the first Islamic Association of Students abroad, including those along the Ruhollah Khomeini in Paris. After Iranian Revolution, he became a member of Islamic Republican Party's center leadership. He is one of the survivors of Hafte Tir bombing which led to the death of Mohammad Beheshti, IRP's secretary-general. He was pulled out of rubble alive after four hours. He then became CEO of Iran's Post Company. He was Deputy Minister of Interior in Political affairs from 1988 to 1989. In 1989, he became CEO of Customs Agency of Iran. After Akbar Hashemi Rafsanjani was reelected as President in 1993, Mohammadkhan was nominated by him as Minister of Finance. He was approved by the Parliament. He was Iran's Minister of Economy for four years and was succeeded by Hossein Namazi in 1997. He was one of the founders of Moderation and Development Party and was latterly Vice President of Center for Strategic Research.

== Personal life and death ==
Mohammadkhan died on 6 November 2022, at the age of 76.
