= Monir Vakili =

Iranian soprano (1924–1983)

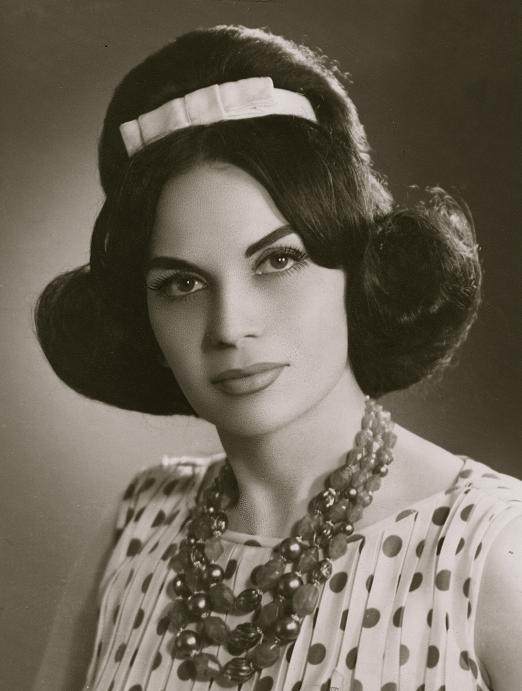

Background information
- Born: 19 December 1924; Tabriz, Qajar Iran
- Died: 28 February 1983 (aged 59) Nivelles, Belgium
- Genres: Opera
- Occupations: Opera singer, opera director and producer
- Instrument: Voice
- Years active: 1940s–1983
- Website: www.monirvakili.com

Monir Vakili (Persian: منیر وکیلی; 19 December 1924 – 28 February 1983) was an Iranian soprano. She was the first Persian singer to popularise Persian folk songs in Iran and the international music scene.

== Biography ==
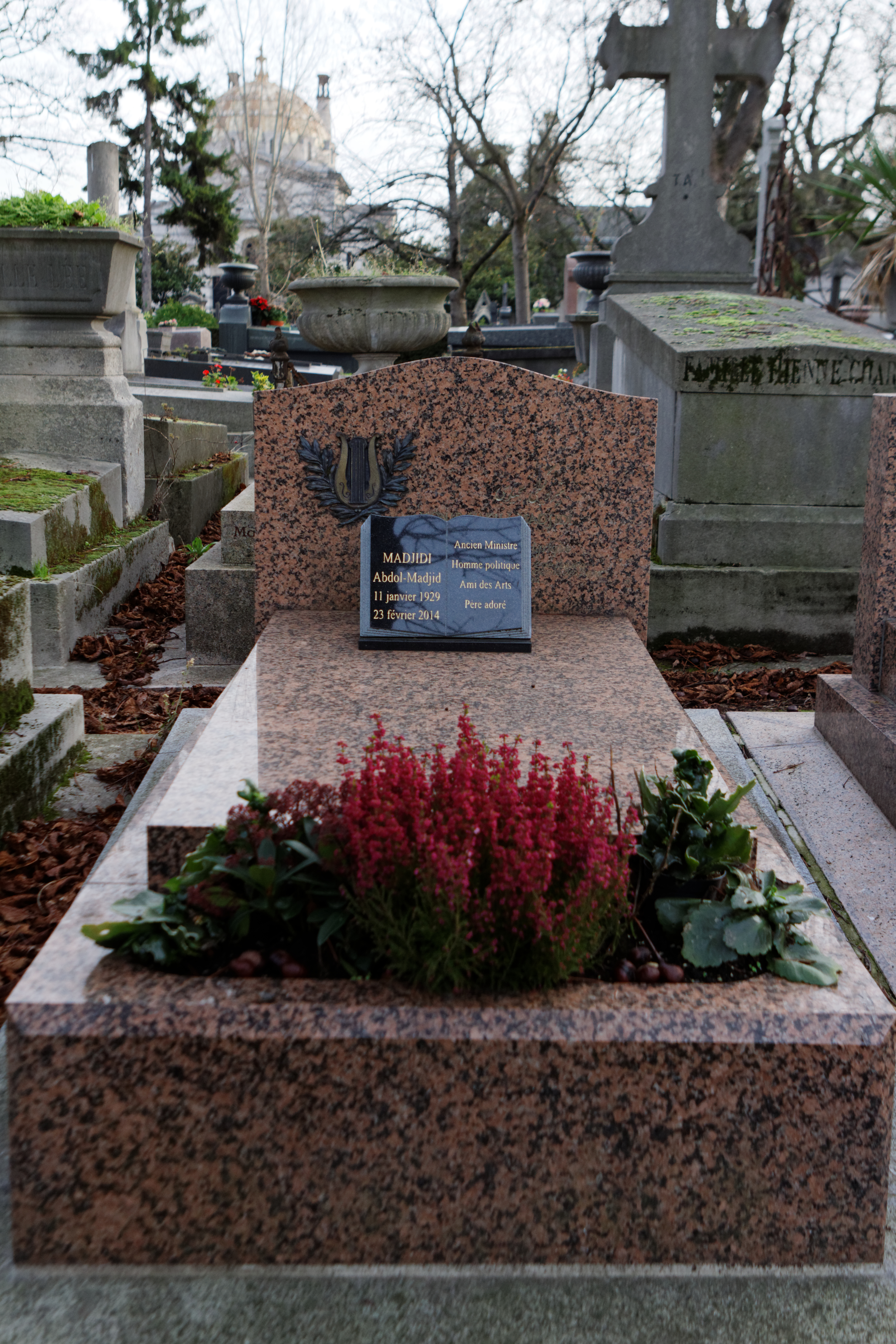
Père-Lachaise Cemetery

Monir was born to a family of art and music enthusiasts. Her father encouraged her interest in opera and supported her decision to study abroad. Monir studied voice and theater at the Conservatoire National Supérieur de Musique et De Danse de Paris and continued her training in opera directing at the New England Conservatory of Music in Boston, Massachusetts.

Monir was one of the singers who started the first opera company in Iran. She gave performances in roles including Madama Butterfly, Mimi in La Bohème, Violetta in La Traviata, and Liu in Turandot, at the Rudaki Hall. She intended to bring the level of artistry in Iran up to international standards. She produced and hosted a series in the National Iranian Television featuring selections from Rudaki Hall, and created an opera film festival and established the Academy of Voice, a government-funded, co-educational boarding school to educate and train students in the art of opera and choral singing.

In 1951, Monir placed first at the Berlin Youth Festival (in the vocal category) and in 1975 she was the recipient of the Forugh Farrokhzad Award. She recorded an album, "Chants et Danses de Perse" in Paris in 1958, of songs from different regions of Iran. It won the Grand Prix du Disque of the Académie Charles Cros. Baazgasht ("Resurrection"), is a rendition of the album.

Monir attended the American School in Hamedan where she performed as soloist and member of the church choir.

== Awards, honours and other details ==
She studied at the Conservatoire Nationale de Musique de Paris 1949–52, majoring in Operatic Singing and Performing Arts.

She was a vocal coach at Tehran National Conservatory of Music, 1955–57. She performed recitals at the French Institute and Romanian Embassy, Tehran, 1955–56. She studied at the New England Conservatory in Boston, Massachusetts, 1960–61, majoring in Opera Directing. She staged the first televised opera scenes from Madama Butterfly and La Traviata on Habib Sabet's Iran Television, May 1961. She was a Radio Tehran and Association of Friends of the French Culture-Soloist and Choir Member, 1969–71.

She was Executive Director of Rudaki Hall Programs for NIRTV (Performing Arts Program), Tehran, Iran, Executive Producer of the first Opera Film Festival in the world at the Rudaki Hall in Tehran, Iran, 1977, and Executive Director and Producer and Host of the Television Program for NIRTV.

She appeared in 19 operas as the lead or second lead and directed two major operas in Tehran.

She was one of the co-founders of the Tehran Opera Company and the founder of the Academy of Voice, Tehran, Iran, 1977, and member of the Board of Directors of the International Shiraz Arts Festival.

== Awards ==
She was recipient of the Best Folk Songs Award, Berlin Youth Festival, 1951. Recipient of the Forough Farrokhzad Award, 1976.

== Personal life and death ==
She toured and performed extensively in Russia, Tajikestan, Bulgaria, Romania, France, Germany, Italy and the United States. Vakili's first husband was Dr. Ahmad Razavi. After divorce she was married to Abdol Majid Majidi. They had two daughters: Scheherazade (a.k.a. ZaZa) and Djamileh. Vakili died in a car accident in Belgium on 28 February 1983, as her husband's car collided with a tank. They had been driving to an informal gathering with prominent diplomats. She was buried in Père Lachaise Cemetery, Paris, where her husband would also be laid down on 28 March 2014.
