= Eprime Eshag =

Assyrian-Iranian-born economist

- Born: 6 November 1918; Urmia, Sublime State of Iran
- Died: 24 November 1998 (aged 80); Oxford, England

Academic background
- Education: London School of Economics; University of Cambridge
- Influences: Joan Robinson; Michał Kalecki; J. M. Keynes

Academic work
- Discipline: Keynesian economics
- School or tradition: Post-Keynesian economics
- Institutions: United Nations; Wadham College, Oxford

Eprime Eshag (Persian: اپريم اسحاق, born Urmia, Iran, 6 November 1918 – died Oxford, England, 24 November 1998) was an Assyrian-Iranian-born Keynesian socialist economist. He was born to an Assyrian family; his father was a preacher and his family was "of no great means."

In 1936, Eshag won a scholarship from the Bank Melli Iran to study accountancy at the London School of Economics. Whilst there his interests turned to economics and he was noticed by J. M. Keynes as being "a man of promise". After working in the Bank Melli in Tehran for a short period in 1946, he left to pursue private accountancy work. At around this time he was active in the left-wing Tudeh Party.

In his work, Eshag was influenced by and supported the work of Joan Robinson, Michał Kalecki as well as J. M. Keynes and was particularly noted for applying his economic knowledge in the context of development. He was appointed by the United Nations (UN) as an Economic Affairs Officer in the UN Secretariat and spent nearly a decade there. His period with the UN ended after a confrontation with UN Secretary General Dag Hammarskjöld over the latter's request that Eshag tone down his critique of western powers' role in the Congo. In 1963, Eshag became a Fellow of Wadham College and a lecturer at the Institute of Economics and Statistics in Oxford University. He stayed at Oxford from 1963 to his partial retirement in 1986. During this period, he continued working for the United Nations on various contracts.

The most noted of his publications was his (1984) Fiscal and Monetary Policies and Problems in Developing Countries.
