= Central Insurance of Iran =

Financial regulatory agency

- Persian: بیمه مرکزی جمهوری اسلامی ایران

Agency overview
- Formed: 1971
- Jurisdiction: Iran
- Headquarters: Tehran, Iran
- Agency executive: Parviz Khosh-kalam Khosroshahi, CEO
- Parent agency: Ministry of Economic Affairs and Finance (Iran)
- Website: centinsur.ir

The Central Insurance of Iran is the financial regulatory agency in charge of regulating the Iranian insurance industry. Central Insurance was established to regulate, standardise and guide the local insurance industry.

As of 2018, the agency regulated more than 25 insurance companies in Iran that work as a private companies and there is one state owned company known as "Bimeh Iran insurance Co.".

== History ==
In 2006 the market share for private insurance companies stood at 54% and 46% for governmental insurance companies. At the end of 2008, there were 20 insurance firms active in the market, only 4 of which were state-owned (with a 75% market share). As of 2014, twenty-five insurance companies are active in Iran and all, except one, are privately owned.

By 2008, the total insurance premiums generated in Iran were $4.3 billion. This is less than 0.1% of the world's total, while Iran has approximately 1% of the world's population. The insurance penetration rate is approximately 1.4%, significantly below the global average of 7.5%. This underdevelopment is also evident in product diversity.

=== Insurance market by 2012 ===
Approximately 60% of all insurance premiums are generated from car insurance. There are about 14 million vehicles in Iran and 90 percent of them are insured (2012). Of the 10 million motorcycles that operate on Iran's roads only 2 million are insured. Also, 95% of all premiums come from general insurance contracts and only 5% relate to life products (against world average of 58% for life insurance in 2011). One of the defining characteristics of the economy is entrenched high inflation (and expectations) thanks to persistent monetisation of fiscal deficits. This produces an environment in which no prudent person would enter into a long-term savings contract. According to Business Monitor International, unless and until economic policies in Iran change radically, the reality of the insurance sector will fall a long way short of its potential.

=== Iranian tanker insurance under sanctions 2012 ===
Since 2012, Iran is insuring its own fleet of oil tankers because of international sanctions.

== Payout ratio ==
Payout ratios have shown consistent growth over the years. Last year, the industry average payout ratio was 86%. Iran has 2 re-insurers. Insurance premiums come to just below 1% of GDP. This is partly attributable to low average income per head. In 2001/02 third-party liability insurance accounted for 46% of premiums, followed by health insurance (13%), fire insurance (around 10%) and life insurance (9.9%).

Insurance industry’s payout ratio stood at 63.8% during the fiscal year ended in March 2016. Insurers' generated premiums totaled $6.5 billion during the said period. Iran Insurance Company, the only state-owned firm, accounted for 39.47% of the premium. Asia Insurance and Alborz Insurance trail by a big margin behind IIC, holding 10.15% and 7.56% of the market’s share, respectively.

== Auto liability ==
Third-part auto liability accounted for 37.6% of insurance firms’ total generated premiums during the year ended in March 2016, with insurers selling about 19.18 million auto policies in the period. As of 2014 total (non-life) market premium was 1.27% of GDP with only $69 per capita spent on insurance.

== International ==
As of 2016, Norway's Skuld (shipping), UK's Steamship Mutual and Standard Club (shipping), Protection and Indemnity (P&I) clubs (shipping), France's Coface (export guarantee agency), Italy's SACE (export credit agency), Germany's Hermes (export credit agency), Austria's OeKB (export credit agency) and Switzerland's SERV (export credit agency) are back doing business in Iran. Many large reinsurance companies are also considering returning to Iran (including Lloyd's, Allianz, Zurich Insurance, Hannover Re and RSA).
