= Alireza Sagharchi =

British-Iranian architect

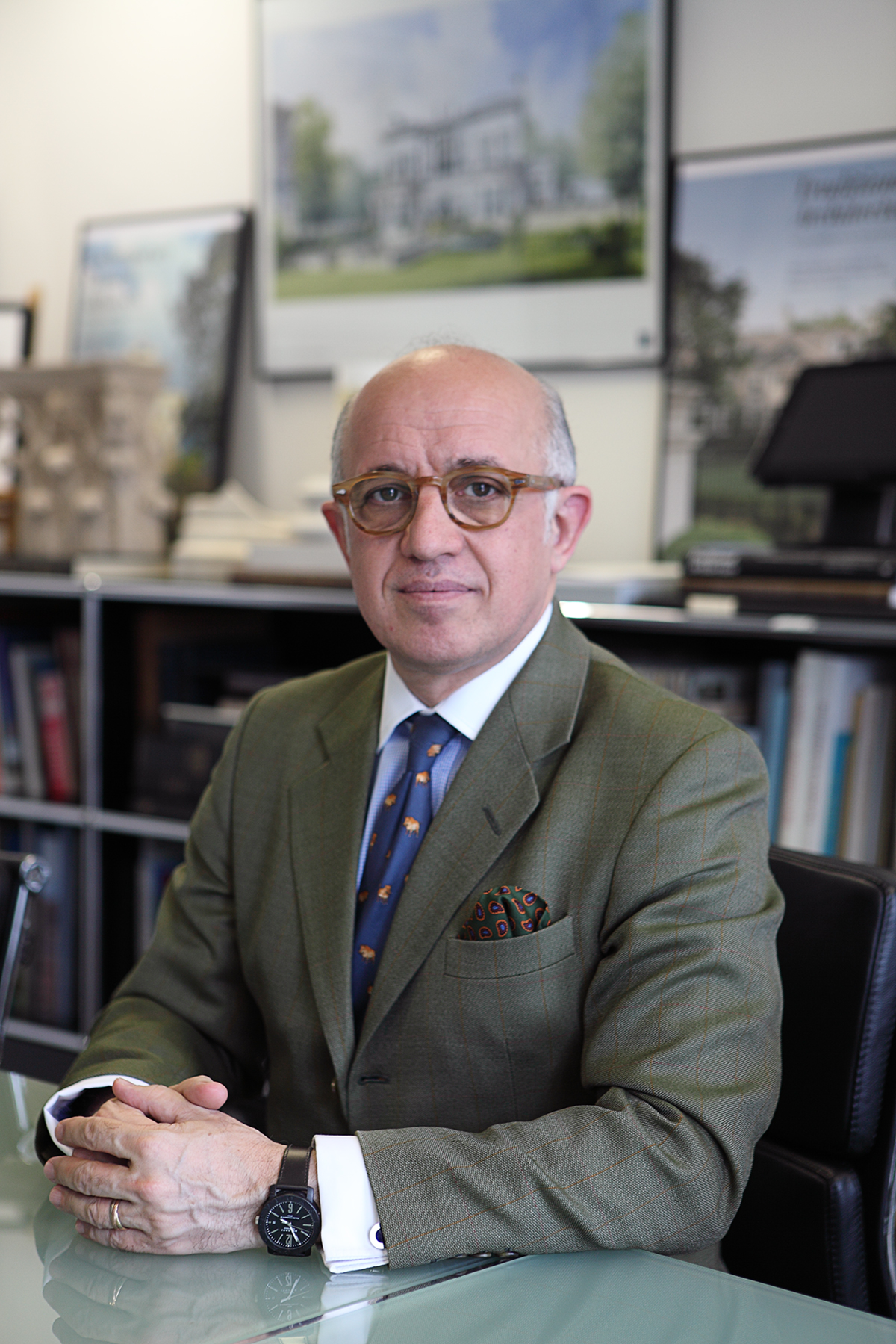
- Born: 1959 (age 66–67)
- Education: Concord College, Acton Burnell; University of Westminster
- Occupation: Architect
- Practice: Stanhope Gate Architecture
- Website: Official website

Alireza Sagharchi RIBA FRSA (Persian: علیرضا ساغرچی; born 1959) is a British-Iranian architect. He is an internationally renowned and leading practitioner of contemporary classical architecture and traditional urban design. During his professional career, he has been responsible for major master planning and building projects in the UK, Europe, North America and the Middle East.

== Education & Career ==
Sagharchi was educated at Concord College, Acton Burnell, England and studied Architecture at the University of Westminster in London and received his Diploma in 1986. He is the founder and Principal of Stanhope Gate Architecture in London. Established in 2002, the firm specialises in master planning, and New Classical architecture.

He has been responsible for several high-profile master-planning, resort/leisure and private residential projects in the United Kingdom, Europe, and the Middle East. Notable among these projects are residential developments in Serris, France, resorts in Croatia and Romania, major listed and new buildings in London, a Palace complex in Madrid, equestrian facilities in Spain, and major residences in the Middle East and The Caucuses.

Before establishing his practice, Sagharchi was the Senior Associate at Porphyrios Associates, in London where his projects included the New Quadrangle for Magdalen College in Oxford, the King's Cross, London regeneration preliminary master plan, Princeton University Whitman College master plan and major office and Hotel buildings.

Sagharchi is a Fellow of the Royal Society of Arts and a Liveryman of the Worshipful Company of Chartered Architects. He is a trustee of the International Network for Traditional Building Architecture and Urbanism INTBAU and a member of The Prince’s Foundation. He was the Chair of the Traditional Architecture Group at the Royal Institute of British Architects, RIBA for over seven years, and a Built Environment Expert at the Design Council and the Commission for Architecture and the Built Environment. He has recently served on the jury for European Prize of Architecture, Philippe Rottheir.

== Books and Publications ==
Sagharchi taught at the Prince of Wales' Institute of Architecture, now The Prince’s Foundation and has been a visiting lecturer at schools of architecture in the UK and the US. His work has been published in a recent monograph titled,Classicism at Home: Architecture of Alireza Sagharchi, published by Rizzoli New York, edited by Clive Aslet with a foreword by HRH The Prince of Wales (Prince Charles) and Léon Krier. He is also the co-author, with Lucien Steil, of books titled ‘New Palladians’ Artmedia and 'Traditional Architecture' by Rizzoli. His biography features in the book, ‘The Intellectual Life of the Architect Vol 1’ edited by Samir Younés, Papadakis Publishers.

== Talks ==
- Contextual Classicism, TAG Talk Traditional Architecture Group, London, UK
- Cities Architecture and urban design, European Housing Forum, Berlin, Germany
- Alireza Sagharchi, Recent Works, Premio Rafael Manzano Martos, Madrid, Spain
- An Architectural Journey in search of Tradition, Robert A M Stern Lecture, University of Notre dame, USA
- Persian Grace, National Romanticism in 20th Century Iranian Architecture
- Conception of Architecture as Commodity, Masterclass for The Prince's Foundation - London, UK
- The Durable & The Disposable, University of Notre dame, USA

== Articles and Essays ==
- Travel Sketches from Elsewhere Nowhere, Lucien Steil, Ediciones Asimetricas 2022
- Country Life Magazine Feature 31 August 2022
- Country Life Magazine Feature 24 August 2022
- Stables, High Design for Horses, o.Riera Ojeda& v.Deupi, Rizzoli 2021
- Intellectual Life of the Architect, Samir Younes, Papadakis, 2018
- In the mood for Architecture, Lucien Steil Wasmuth 2018
- How to imbue practice with tradition. INTBAU 2017 Event (pp. 22–30).
- Val d’Europe A City Vision, M.Culot& B.Durand Rival, 2016
- Durability in Construction, R. Economakis Papadakis 2015
- The Architectural Capriccio, Lucien Steil, Routledge 2013
- Architectural Digest feature 2016
- RIBA Journal, May 2010
- Architects Journal, May 2009
- Jutarnjilist, Dubrovnik, Sipan island Project, July 2008
- Luxury Hotelier, November 2007
- Architecture Today, February 2006
- The Times House, 12 December 2003

== Exhibitions ==
- Real Architecture, London
- Traditional Architecture Group at The Prince's Foundation
- Other Architecture, Philippe Rotthier European Prize for Architecture, Architecture Foundation, Brussels
- The Venice Biennale Architecture, INTBAU Exhibition, Italy
- New Palladians, The Prince's Foundation, London
- New Palladians, Gorcums Museum, Holland
- New Palladians, University of Notre Dame, U.S.A.
