= Petroleum University of Technology =

Iranian university

- دانشگاه صنعت نفت; Dāneshgāh-e San'at Naft
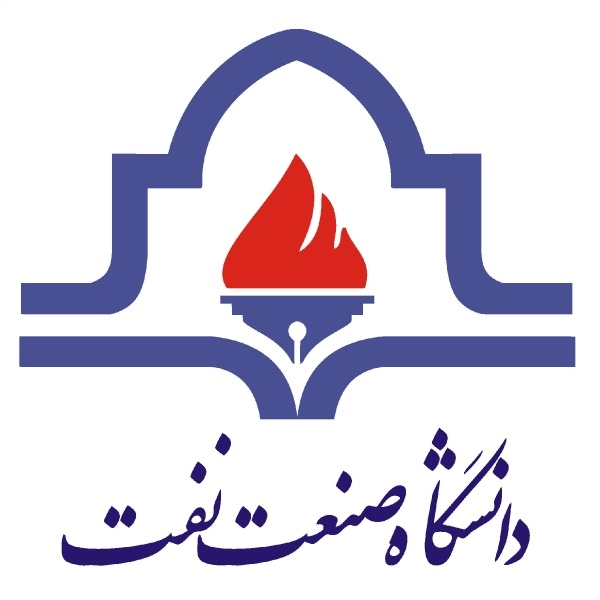
- Seal of the Petroleum University of Technology
- Other name: PUT
- Former name: Abadan Institute of Technology
- Type: Public
- Established: 1939 (1318 SH)
- Religious affiliation: FUIW
- Academic affiliations: IAU, ICTP, TWAS
- President: Mohammadreza Khosravi-Nikou
- Academic staff: 66
- Students: 1,502
- Doctoral students: 37
- Location: Abadan, Ahwaz, Mahmudabad, Tehran, Iran; 31°13′38.25″N 48°39′10.36″E
- Campus: Multiple urban campuses, 370,000 m^{2} (4,000,000 sq ft)
- Language: Persian, English
- Colours: Dark blue and red
- Sporting affiliations: Athletic Association of Affiliated Universities, National Athletic Association of Universities
- Website: www.put.ac.ir

The Petroleum University of Technology (Persian: دانشگاه صنعت نفت) is an Iranian public university funded by the Ministry of Petroleum particularly by its main company, the NIOC. It was founded in 1939 in Abadan in response to the increasing industrialization of Iran oil company, and is officially the second oldest university in Iran after University of Tehran According to QS World University Rankings 2020 for petroleum engineering programs, PUT has not been placed among the top 100 universities. It offers B.Sc., M.S and Doctorate programs for upstream and downstream oil and gas industry such as petroleum engineering, chemical engineering, offshore engineering, instrumentation engineering, mechanical engineering, electrical engineering, accounting, and marine engineering. It has four campuses in Ahwaz, Abadan, Tehran and Mahmudabad and some research centers.

Petroleum University of Technology

== History ==
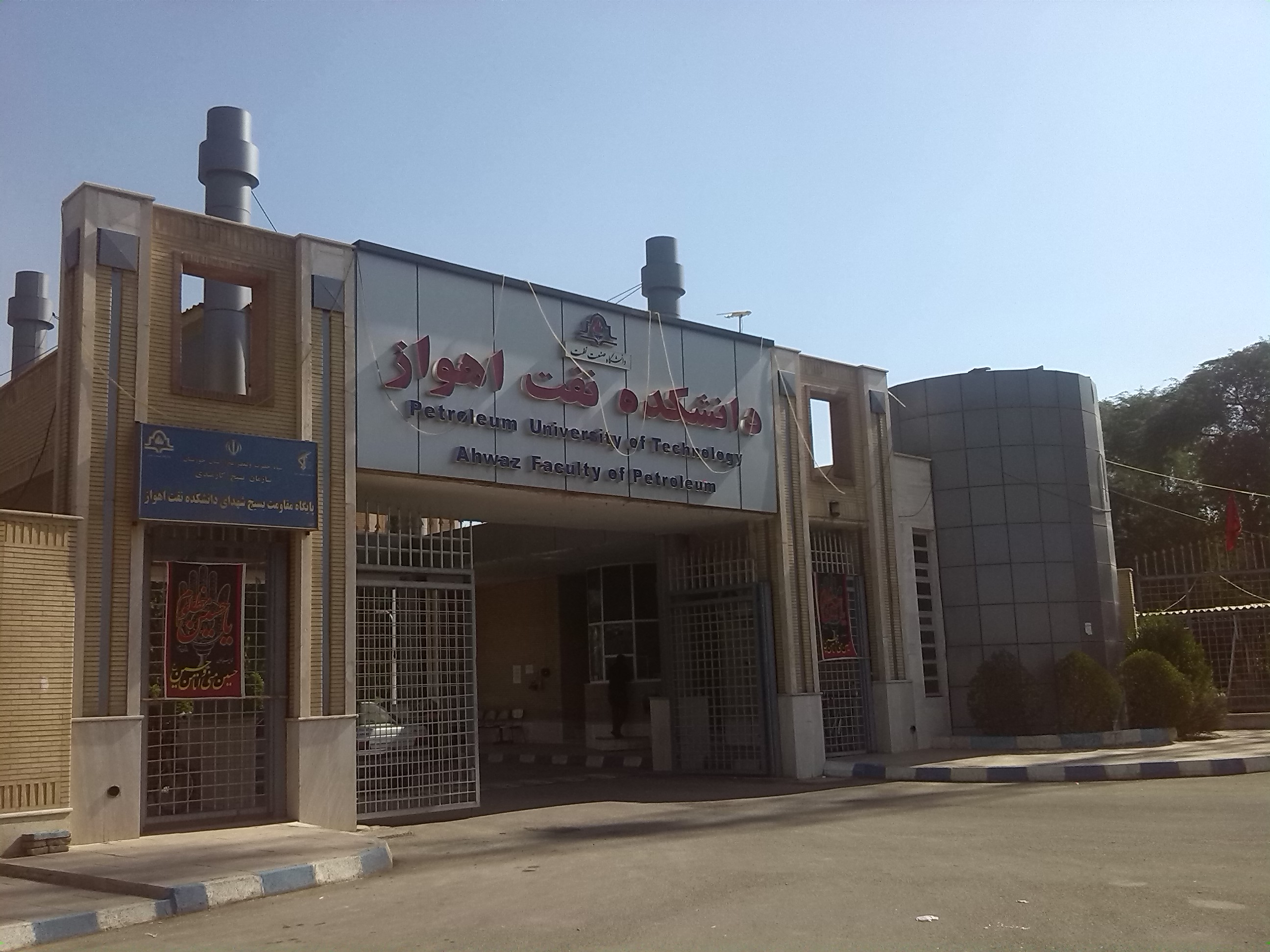
Ahwaz Petroleum University of Technology

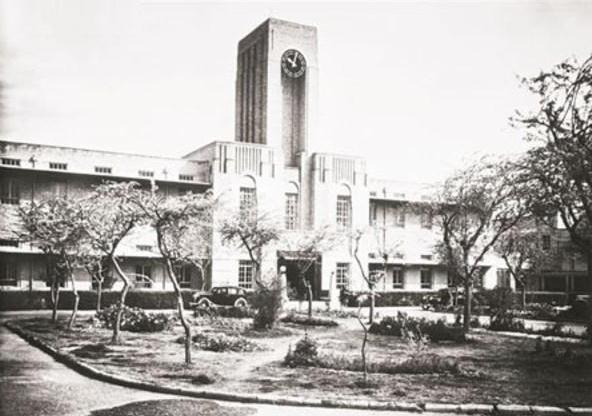
Abadan Institute of Technology in 1939

The name of the university has been changed several times. The university was established in 1939 in Abadan as Abadan Technical School. The academic program comprised working and studying in sequence. The students (if employed) spent two-fifths of the academic program in the school and three-fifths in the Abadan Refinery (Persian: پالايشگاه آبادان Pālāyeshgāh-e Ābādān) as trainees.

In 1956, the new curriculum was prepared by Lafayette College of Pennsylvania for two years of pre engineering and four years of general engineering. The curriculum was approved by National Iranian Oil Company and 79 students out of several thousand applicants were selected based on written test and interview. The name was changed to Abadan Institute of Technology (AIT). By then, the educational program focused on the general engineering major; admissions were given to fourth grade high school students after passing an entry test and interviews. The last admissions of the program were granted in 1961 and the first students graduated in 1962.

In 1962, the new program was introduced that offered B.S. degrees in petroleum engineering, economic and administrative sciences and accounting. The programs was still internship-orientated.

After the outbreak of the Iran–Iraq War, the university was relocated. It was first moved to Gachsaran in 1981. The universities all over the country reopened in December 1982 and the university moved to the current location of Ahwaz Faculty of Petroleum in Kut-e Abdollah, Karun County.

After the Iran–Iraq War, in 1989, the Ministry of Culture and Higher Education granted permission to found the Petroleum University of Technology. All the educational institutions of the Ministry of Petroleum are supervised by the university. Ministry of Petroleum, then founded the Abadan Shahid Tondghuyan Faculty of Chemical and Petrochemical Engineering or Abadan Faculty of Petroleum in February 1992 in the location of the former Abadan Institute of Technology and The Research Center of Petroleum University of Technology in the campus of the current Ahwaz Faculty of Petroleum in 1993.

== Today ==
As of 2015, the Petroleum University of Technology consists of four faculties in cities that offer 13 undergraduate, 11 graduate and three doctorate programs:

- Ahvaz Faculty of Petroleum (or PUT Ahvaz),
- Abadan Faculty of Petroleum (or PUT Abadan),
- Tehran Faculty of Petroleum (N.I.O.C. school of Accounting and Finance ) (or PUT Tehran),
- Mahmudabad Faculty of Marine Sciences (or PUT Mahmudabad).

The university has four research centers:

- Ahvaz Faculty of Petroleum Research Center;
- Abadan Faculty of Petroleum Research Center;
- Tehran Faculty of Petroleum Research Center and,
- Mahmudabad Faculty of Marine Sciences Offshore Oil & Gas Industries Research Center.

PUT programs:

The programs offered by each faculty:
Faculty	B.Sc.	M.S.	Ph.D.
Ahvaz	Petroleum engineering with focuses on three academic minors: Reservoir engineering; Drilling engineering; Production engineering; Chemical engineering; Electrical engineering with focus on instrumentation engineering; Mechanical engineering with focus on applied designing	Petroleum engineering with focuses on three academic minors: Reservoir engineering; Drilling engineering; Production engineering; Drilling and production engineering; Gas processing and transmission engineering; Instrumentation engineering	Petroleum engineering, minors: Reservoir engineering; Production engineering; Chemical engineering in separation and transport phenomena
Abadan	Safety engineering in: Technical inspection; Technical protection; Chemical engineering; Petroleum engineering with focus on mining and exploration engineering	Chemical engineering with HSE minor; Petroleum engineering with focus on mining engineering; Safety and technical inspection engineering	None
Tehran	Accounting; Business Management; Industrial Management	Finance with focus on Investment in Petroleum Industry; Energy Economics; Law with focus on Petroleum and Energy Law; Petroleum engineering with focus on reservoir engineering; Industrial engineering in project management	None
Mahmudabad	Ship engineering with focus on engine	Civil engineering in offshore installations; Energy Systems engineering with focus on energy in Oil and Gas Industries	None

== Roles and goals ==
The priorities of the PUT are maintaining the resources of oil and gas in the country and training manpower for the development and exploitation of these resources.

== Students ==
According to the Iranian university entrance exam (Konkoor), students ranked between 2000 and 4000 usually enter PUT.

A student has won the bronze medal of the ninth South Eastern European Mathematical Olympiad for University Students (SEEMOUS 2015) that took place in Ohrid, Republic of Macedonia, from March 3–8, 2015.

== Notable alumni ==
- Seifi Ghasemi, CEO of Air Products
- Dr. Hojatollah Ghanimi Fard (and Ex Vice Minister for Ministry of Petroleum and Ex Vice Minister of Ministry of Commerce)

== See also ==
- Petroleum industry in Iran
