= Khodadad Mirza Farman Farmaian =

Iranian-British economist, banker and politician

Khodadad Mirza Farman Farmaian (Persian: خداداد فرمانفرمائیان; 8 May 1928 – 16 December 2015) was a son of Prince Abdol-Hossein Farman Farma of the Qajar dynasty of Iran and his wife Hamdam Khanoum. During the Pahlavi era, he held the post of governor of the Central Bank of Iran.

He was the chief architect of the 1960s Iranian economic boom. However, he often dismissed Mohammad Reza Shah as incompetent. He fled to London during the 1979 Iranian revolution.

He died of lung cancer at the age of 87 in London, United Kingdom, on 16 December 2015.

== See also ==
- Iran
- History of Iran
- Qajar dynasty

== Sources ==
- Daughter of Persia; Sattareh Farman Farmaian with Dona Munker; Crown Publishers, Inc., New York, 1992
- Blood and Oil: Memoirs of a Persian Prince; Manucher Mirza Farman Farmaian. Random House, New York, 1997.

Government offices
Preceded by Mahdi Samii	Governor of the Central Bank of Iran; 1969–1970	Succeeded by Mahdi Samii
