= Mohammad-Ali Molavi =

Iranian economist

- Molavi in 1979

Governor of the Central Bank of Iran
- In office 25 February 1979 – 5 November 1979
- Prime Minister: Mehdi Bazargan
- Preceded by: Yousef Khoshkish
- Succeeded by: Alireza Nobari

Personal details
- Born: 26 September 1918 (age 108 years, 8 days) Tabriz, Iran
- Party: National Front
- Education: University of Paris

Mohammad-Ali Molavi (Persian: محمدعلی مولوی) was an Iranian economist who served as the governor of the Central Bank of Iran from 25 February to 5 November 1979, when he resigned from the office.

Before Iranian Revolution, he served as the delegate of Iran to the European Community.

== Education ==
In 1957, Molavi obtained a PhD in economics from University of Paris.

== Political affiliation ==
Although Molavi was a member of the National Front, he was never imprisoned. A leaked 10 May 1979 United States diplomatic cable described Molavi as "beholden" to Abolhassan Banisadr and politically dependent on Mohammad Kazem Shariatmadari, as well as "having no support" from Ruhollah Khomeini.

== Economic policies ==
He adopted a dual exchange rate.

== Bibliography ==
- Molavi, M. A. (1967), "Les blocages du développement en Iran", Tiers-Monde (in French), 8 (30), Revue Tiers Monde: 349–370, doi:10.3406/tiers.1967.2357

Government offices
Preceded by Yousef Khoshkish	Governor of the Central Bank of Iran; 1979	Succeeded by Alireza Nobari
