= Alireza Nobari =

Iranian bank governor

Governor of the Central Bank of Iran
- In office 1979–1981
- President: Abolhassan Banisadr
- Preceded by: Mohammad-Ali Molavi
- Succeeded by: Mohsen Nourbakhsh

Personal details
- Party: Office for the Cooperation of the People with the President

Alireza Nobari is the former Governor of the Central Bank of the Islamic Republic of Iran (Bank Markazi Iran). At the time of his appointment, he was the youngest person, at thirty two years old, to ever have served as a central banker.

== Education ==
Alireza Nobari held graduate degrees from Ecole Polytechnique and Stanford in mathematics, physics, economics and operations research. He was also the first person from Iran in thirty five years to receive a full scholarship to Ecole Polytechnique which was granted after he received the highest score in the country on his high school comprehensive exams.

== Career ==
He was appointed to the position of Governor of the Central Bank by newly elected President Abolhassan Banisadr in late 1979 and served as Iran's Central Banker until he was forcibly ousted in the coup of June 1981 (which also ousted President Banisadr and other members of Banisadr's government).

Ali Reza Nobari served as Iran's Central Banker during the Iran Hostage Crisis. And during that time, he appeared on American ABC television channel programme Nightline with Ted Koppel. He worked tirelessly to unfreeze Iran's funds in the American banks and bring about a speedy release of American hostages. His position was supported by then President Banisadr but opposed by others close to Khomeini.

Immediately following the impeachment that removed Ali Reza and Banisadr, Banisadr's and Ali's supporters were arrested and either executed or tortured.

Ali managed to survive by using a disguise to exit the bank (which was surrounded) and then went underground. He spent months in hiding and finally escaped when Reza Abdolahi (the older brother of one of his close associates) paid two of Iran's top athletes to walk him over the Zagros Mountains to safety in Turkey. Ali Reza was in poor shape for the trek and would often collapse. But the two athletes charged with his safety managed to rouse him with a simple threat, "If they find you, you will not like what they will do to you so it is better we shoot you now."

The two athletes responsible for helping Ali escape were executed for their 'crime'.

Ali Reza now lives in Switzerland with his wife, Zahra Banisadr, and their three children. He has two other children by a former marriage to Cheryl Hugle, daughter of Frances Hugle (1927 – 1968) an American scientist, engineer and inventor, founder of Siliconex Inc.

== Publications ==
- Ali Reza Nobari, ed. Iran Erupts: Independence: News and Analysis of the Iranian National Movement. Stanford: Iran-America Documentation Group, 1978.

Government offices
Preceded by Mohammad-Ali Molavi	Governor of the Central Bank of Iran; 1979–1981	Succeeded by Mohsen Nourbakhsh
Party political offices
Vacant	Campaign manager of Abolhassan Banisadr; 1980	Vacant
