= Mehdi Samii =

Iranian politician, economist and accountant (1918–2010)

- مهدی سمیعی
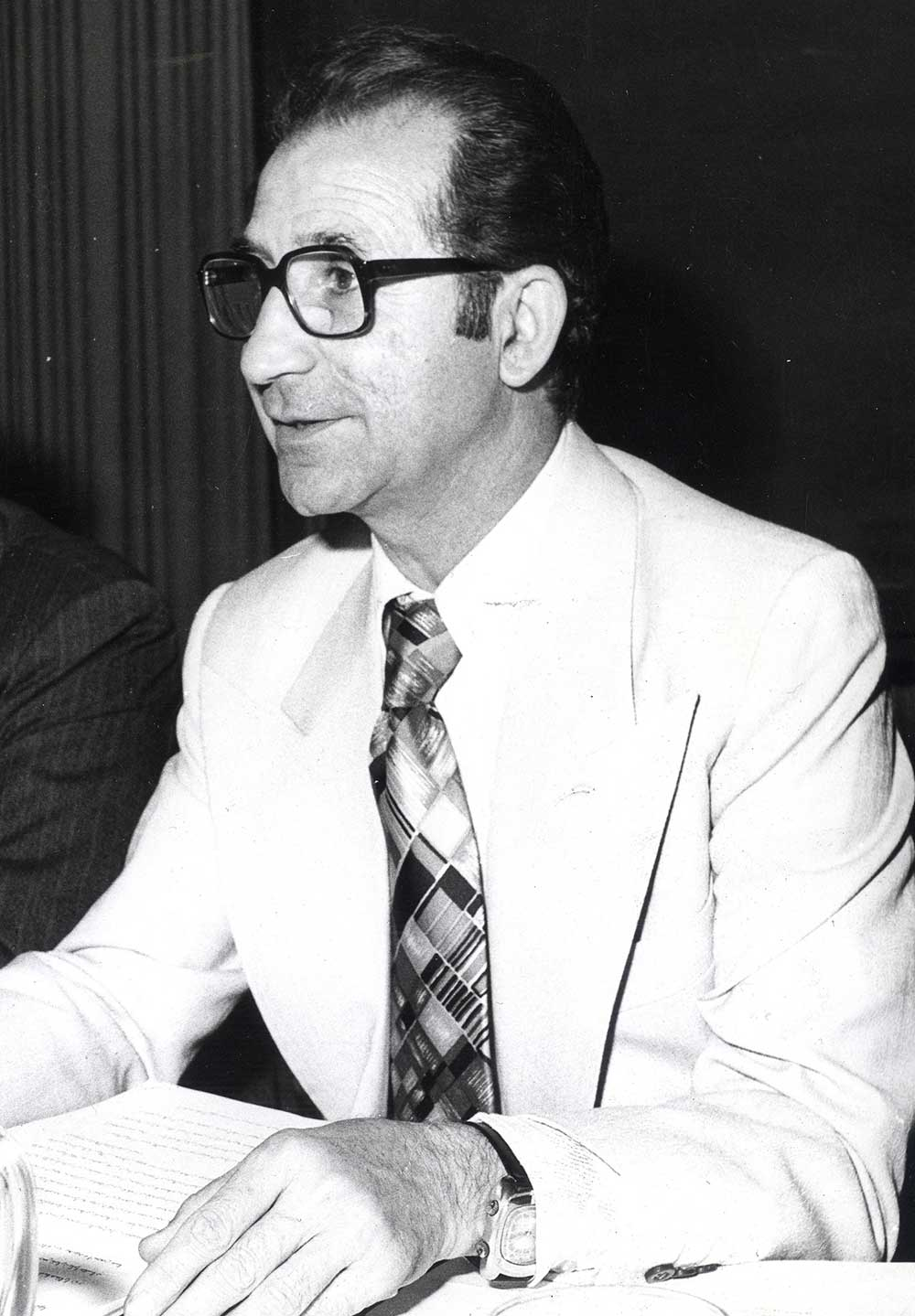

Ambassador-at-large and Advisor to the Prime Minister for International Financing
- In office 1971–1973
- Prime Minister: Amir-Abbas Hoveyda

Governor of the Central Bank of Iran
- In office 1970–1971
- Prime Minister: Amir-Abbas Hoveyda
- Preceded by: Khodadad Farmanfarmaian
- Succeeded by: Abdolali Jahanshahi
- In office 1964–1969
- Prime Minister: Hassan-Ali Mansur
- Deputy: Khodadad Farmanfarmaian
- Preceded by: Ali-Asghar Poorhomayoon
- Succeeded by: Khodadad Farmanfarmaian

Head of Plan and Budget Organization of Iran
- In office 1969–1970
- Prime Minister: Amir-Abbas Hoveyda
- Preceded by: Mohammad-Safi Asfia
- Succeeded by: Khodadad Farmanfarmaian

Personal details
- Born: 24 June 1918 Tehran, Qajar Iran
- Died: 30 June 2010 (aged 92) Los Angeles, California, USA
- Party: Resurgence Party (1975–78); People's Party (1957–75)
- Relatives: Fereydoun Mahdavi

Mohammad-Mehdi Samii (Persian: محمدمهدی سمیعی; 1918–2010) was an Iranian chartered accountant, banker and economist. Samii is credited as "one of the chief architects of Iran's rapid economic and Industrial growth in the 1960s", as well as "a midwife of in the creation of the [Central] bank [of Iran]" and "more than anyone else responsible" for it. According to Abbas Milani, "the fact that the bank was a relatively independent institution, free from corruption and political interference and unusually efficient", is attributed to his leadership.

== Biography ==
Samii was born in Tehran in 1910. He held office as the Governor of the Central Bank of Iran (1964–1969; 1970–1971), the head of Plan and Budget Organization of Iran (1969–1971) and Ambassador-at-large (1971–1973). Before that, Samii rejected job offers for ministerial roles twice: Once in 1960 when Jafar Sharif-Emami offered him the role of the minister of agriculture and the next in the following year when Ali Amini proposed that he become minister of commerce.

He was a co-founder of Iranian Institute of Certified Accountants. He died in 2010.

Diplomatic posts
Vacant Office founded	Ambassador-at-large of Iran for Economic Affairs; 1971–1973	Vacant Office abolished
Government offices
Preceded by Khodadad Farmanfarmaian	Governor of the Central Bank of Iran; 1970–1971	Succeeded by Abdolali Jahanshahi
Preceded by Ali-Asghar Poorhomayoon	Governor of the Central Bank of Iran; 1964–1969	Succeeded by Khodadad Farmanfarmaian
Business positions
Unknown	CEO of Industrial and Mining Development Bank of Iran; 1959–1964	Unknown
Unknown	CEO of Agricultural Development Bank; 1973–1979	Unknown
