= Governor of the Central Bank of Iran =

Iranian office

Governor of Central Bank of Iran
- رئیس کل بانک مرکزی ایران

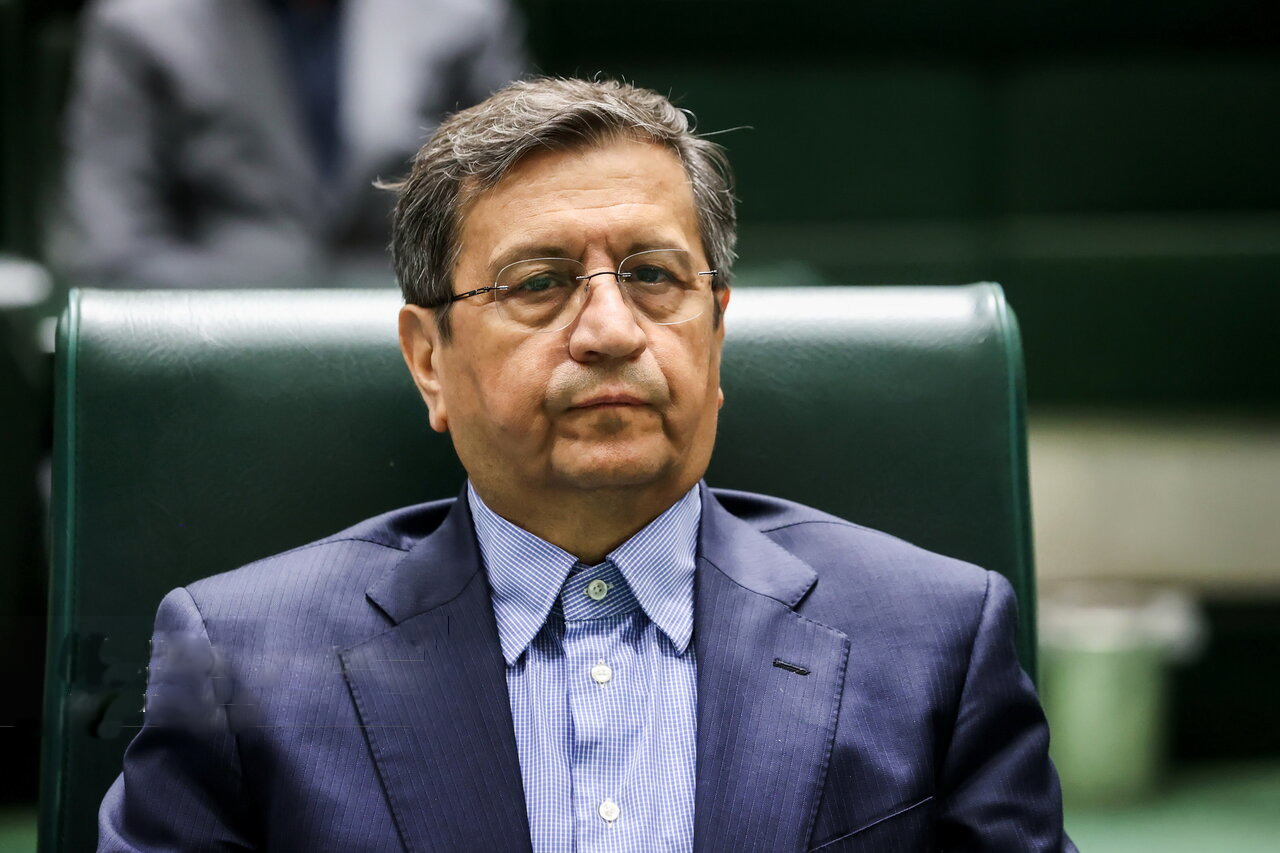
- Incumbent; Abdolnaser Hemmati since 31 December 2025
- Member of: Cabinet of Iran
- Seat: Bank Markazi Tower
- Nominator: Minister of Economic Affairs
- Appointer: President of Iran
- Term length: 5 years
- Formation: 1960; 66 years ago

Governor of the Central Bank of Iran (Persian: رئیس کل بانک مرکزی ایران) is the highest administrative authority of the Central Bank of Iran, making decisions concerning all such current affairs of the bank.

Presently, the President appoints the governor upon the recommendation of the Minister of Economic Affairs and Finance, who must be verified by the CBI's general assembly.

Unlike many countries, the governor of central bank is not mandated to decide on the monetary policy in Iran by himself, but he is head of the body with that responsibility, The Currency and Credit Council, an organ within the central bank but controlled by the government. The governor is assisted by an executive board comprising, in addition to himself as the chairman, the deputy governor, vice-governors, and the secretary-general of the Currency and Credit Council.

The law specifies no fixed term for the governor, however the officeholder is appointed for five years.

== List ==
The historical governors of Central Bank of Iran are:

No.	Name	Term in office		Appointer
No.	Name	Assumed	Left	Appointer
1	Ebrahim Kashani	1960	1961	Manouchehr Eghbal
2	Ali-Asghar Pourhomayoun	1961	1964	Ali Amini
3	Mahdi Samii	1964	1969	Hassan-Ali Mansur
4	Khodadad Farmanfarmaian	1969	1970	Amir-Abbas Hoveyda
(3)	Mahdi Samii	1970	1971	Amir-Abbas Hoveyda
5	Abdol-Ali Jahanshahi	1971	1973	Amir-Abbas Hoveyda
6	Mohammad Yeganeh	1973	1975	Amir-Abbas Hoveyda
7	Hassan Ali Mehran	1975	1978	Amir-Abbas Hoveyda
8	Yousef Khoshkish	1978	1979	Jamshid Amouzegar
9	Mohammad-Ali Molavi	1979		Mehdi Bazargan
10	Alireza Nobari	1979	1981	Abolhassan Banisadr
11	Mohsen Nourbakhsh	1981	1986	Mir-Hossein Mousavi
12	Majid Ghassemi	1986	1989	Mir-Hossein Mousavi
13	Mohammad Hossein Adeli	1989	1994	Akbar Hashemi Rafsanjani
(11)	Mohsen Nourbakhsh	1994	2003	Akbar Hashemi Rafsanjani
(11)	Mohsen Nourbakhsh	1994	2003	Mohammad Khatami
–	Mohammad-Javad Vahaji (acting)	2003		Mohammad Khatami
14	Ebrahim Sheibani	2003	2007	Mohammad Khatami
15	Tahmasb Mazaheri	2007	2008	Mahmoud Ahmadinejad
16	Mahmoud Bahmani	2008	2013	Mahmoud Ahmadinejad
17	Valiollah Seif	2013	2018	Hassan Rouhani
18	Abdolnaser Hemmati	2018	2021	Hassan Rouhani
19	Akbar Komijani	2021	2021	Hassan Rouhani
20	Ali Salehabadi	2021	2022	Ebrahim Raisi
21	Mohammad-Reza Farzin	2022	2025	Ebrahim Raisi Masoud Pezeshkian
(18)	Abdolnaser Hemmati	2025	Incumbent	Masoud Pezeshkian
