= Qolamhossein Bigjekhani =

Iranian musician

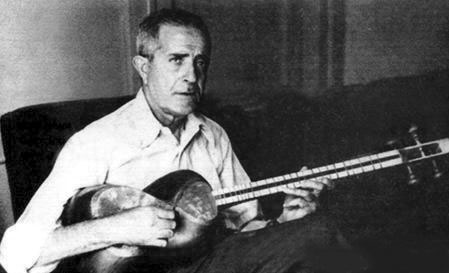

Background information
- Also known as: Qolam-Hossein Bigjeh-Khani
- Born: 1918; Tabriz, Iran
- Died: April 13, 1987
- Occupation(s): Musician, Tar player
- Instrument: Tar

Qolamhossein Bigjekhani, also Qolam-Hossein Bigjeh-Khani, (1918 – April 13, 1987) was an Iranian musician and tar player. He was born in Tabriz.

His art of tar playing is characterized by:

- extreme transparency and a detailed approach to moulding the musical phrases
- fast speed in fingering and plucking
- cultivated taste in balancing avazes and zarbis
- even tremolos and both hand vibrations
- fine sound-making even from low quality instruments
- using Azerbaijani zarbis in his performances
- using dayereh as an accompanying instrument
- fast plucking and various systems of plucking

He left a number of recordings, mostly of Persian Dastgah music. He collaborated mainly with his old friend and Dayereh player M. Farnam. They also played together at the Shiraz Festival of Arts in front of Empress Farah. He also accompanied Mohammad-Reza Shajarian (most notably on a 40 minute improvisation in Homayoon mode).
