= Riyaz Kharrat =

Iranian chemical engineer

Riyaz Kharrat is a professor of engineering at Montanuniversität Leoben.

His research interests and activities are about enhanced oil recovery (EOR), improved oil recovery (IOR), asphaltene & wax studies, thermal recovery methods, and reservoir modeling and simulation.

Kharrat was born on 8 December 1956 in Karbala. He graduated from Hakim Sanai High School of Esfahan, Iran in 1975. He then went to the United States to continue his studies. He obtained his BSc degree in chemical engineering from Kansas University in the United States in 1981, then continued his education with a master's degree and doctorate in chemical engineering, majoring in enhanced oil recovery. During his staying at Kansas University, he was teaching math courses and was working in the Tertiary Oil Recovery Project (TORP).

Kharrat has published more than 170 ISI International publications in well-known international journals, 48 SPE papers, 27 national journals and had participated in more than 165 national and international seminar and symposia and had supervised more than 130 MSc. and PhD. thesis in the field of chemical and petroleum engineering.

== Books ==
- Practical Improved Hydrocarbon Recovery- An Industrial Guide Book for EOR and IOR, Published by Lambert Academic Publishing, 2017.
- Reservoir insitu stress and Geomechanic, publication by Setayesh Publication Institute, 2015.
- Asphaltene and Wax in Oil Field: Remedy and Solution, published by Setayesh Press, 2012.
- Material and Energy balances in Chemical engineering, Published by Kerman University, 2009.
- Enhanced oil recovery, Published by Nehr Danish Institute, 2008.
- Description of Problem Solution of Applied Mathematic in Chemical Engineering, Vol. II, Published by Amir Kabir University, 2008.
- Applied Mathematics in Chemical Engineering – Numerical Solution, Vol. II, Published by Mir Kabir University, 2002.
- Mathematical Modeling in Chemical and Petroleum Engineering, Published by Amir Kabir University, 2002.
- Applied Mathematics in Chemical Engineering- Mathematical Formulation and Analytical Methods, Vol. I, Published by Amir Kabir University, 2001.
- Description of Problem Solution of Applied Mathematic in Chemical Engineering, Vol. I, Published by Amir Kabir University, 2001.
