= Majid Ghassemi =

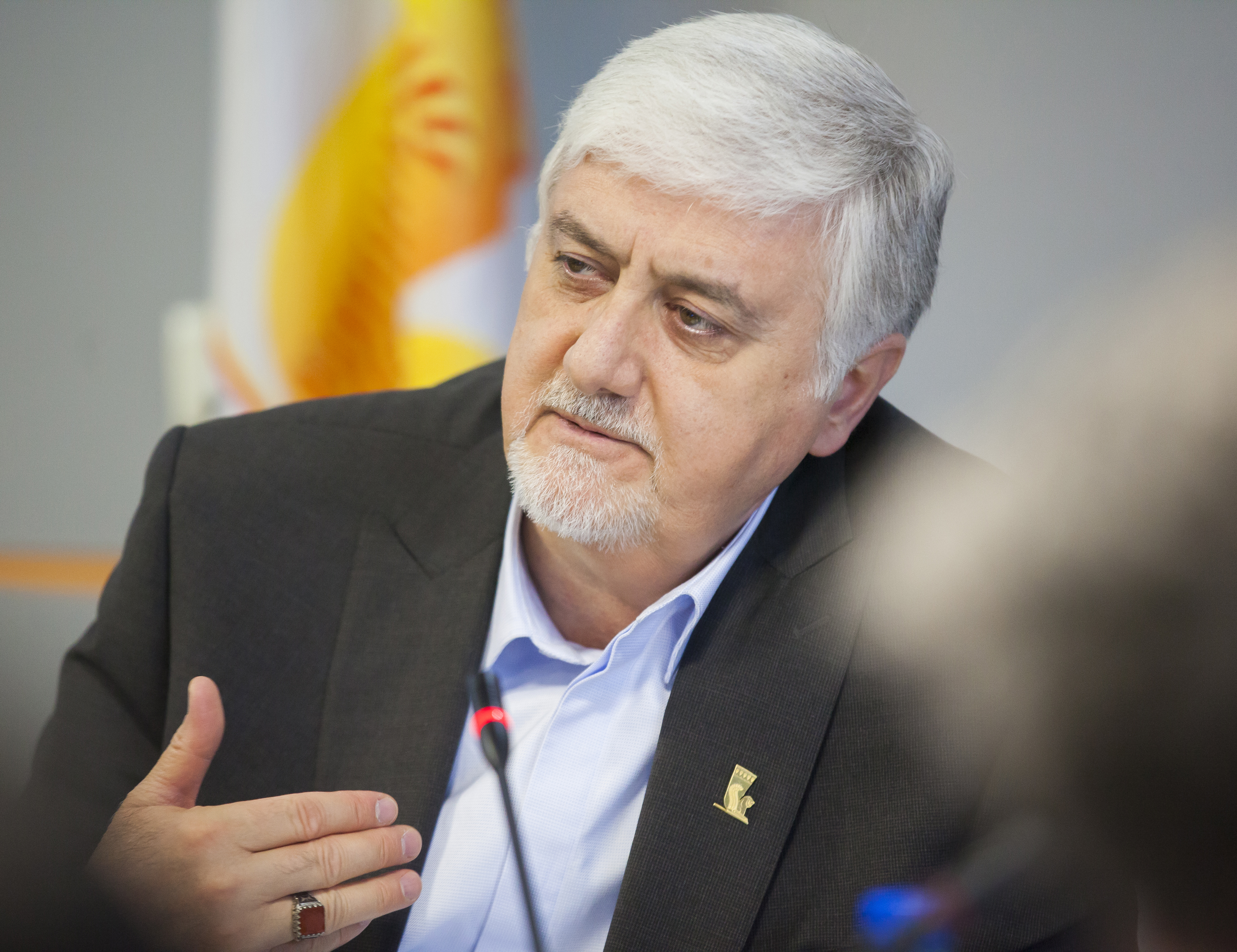
- Ghassemi in May 2015

Governor of the Central Bank of Iran
- In office 1986–1989
- Appointed by: Mir-Hossein Mousavi
- Preceded by: Mohsen Nourbakhsh
- Succeeded by: Mohammad Hossein Adeli

Personal details
- Born: 1952 (age 73–74) Tehran, Iran
- Party: Moderation and Development Party (1999–2007)
- Education: University of Southampton
- Occupation: CEO of Bank Pasargad

Majid Ghassemi (Persian: مجید قاسمی; born 1952 in Tehran) is an Iranian banker, business magnate, and investor. Ghassemi originally established his reputation as the governor of Central Bank of the Islamic Republic of Iran, from 1986 to 1989.

== Early life and education ==
Majid Ghassemi was born in Tehran, Iran in 1952. He attended Dar ul-Funun high school with a concentration on mathematics and received his bachelor's degree from Allameh Tabataba'i University in Business Management. After participating in an exam held by Central Bank of Iran, he won a scholarship for an accounting postgraduate course in Fairleigh Dickinson University in New Jersey, United States. He has also graduated from the University of Southampton, UK with a master's degree in Economics and a PhD. degree in the same concentration.

== Career ==
After winning the Central Bank's scholarship Ghassemi started working in Central Bank. In 1985 during the Iran-Iraq War, he was chosen as CEO of Bank Melli Iran. A year later he was elected as the governor of Central Bank of the Islamic Republic of Iran and was in office until 1989. He then took positions in Iranian Ministry of Energy as the minister's deputy and CEO of several affiliate companies active in steel industries and mining. In 2005, Ghassemi established Bank Pasargad as the Iran's fifth private bank after Islamic Revolution. Presently, he is the CEO and vice chairman of Bank Pasargad and a board member in some of the bank's affiliates.

Government offices
Preceded by Mohsen Nourbakhsh	Governor of the Central Bank of Iran; 1986–1989	Succeeded by Mohammad-Hossein Adeli
Business positions
New title	Chief Executive Officer of Bank Pasargad; 2005–present	Incumbent
