= Bank Pasargad =

Iranian bank

Coordinates: 35.7622°N 51.4158°E

- Type: Public
- Traded as: TSE: BPAS1; ISIN: IRO1BPAS0008
- Industry: Banking, Financial services
- Founded: 14 December 2005
- Headquarters: 430 Mirdamad Boulevard, Tehran, Iran
- Number of locations: 327 branches across Iran
- Area served: Iran
- Key people: Kazem Mirvalad (Chairman); Majid Ghassemi (CEO)
- Services: Consumer banking Investment banking
- Revenue: ▲US$ 1.64 billion (2018)
- Net income: ▲US$ 653.809 million (2018)
- Total assets: US$ 10.577 billion (2015)
- Total equity: US$ 1.607 billion (2015)
- Number of employees: 3685 (2015)
- Website: bpi.ir/en

Bank Pasargad (Persian: بانک پاسارگاد, Bānk-e Pāsārgād), also known as BPI, is a major Iranian bank offering retail, commercial and investment banking services. The company was established in 2005 as a part of the government's privatization of the banking system.

While established in Tehran, the bank operates throughout the nation with 3685 employees and 327 branches. BPI is listed under the Tehran Stock Exchange. In 2006, The bank had an initial capital assessment of $250 million. In 2009, the bank funded and established an art gallery in Tehran. In 2013, The Banker magazine rated BPI as among the top "1000 banks in the world", ranking 257th overall. The Bank is also on The Banker's list of the top 500 Islamic financial institutions.

== Cover committee ==
In 2024 investigative journalism by IITV revealed the bank coordinated Iranian oil smuggling corruption through helping Iranian regime via a cover committee, its members consist of Ali Shamkhani, Yahia Alavi.

== Operations ==
BPI operates as a private bank in Iran. In addition to offering short and fixed deposit accounts for domestic and overseas clients, the bank also provides letters of credit, treasury, currency exchange, corporate loans syndication, financial advisory and electronic banking services.

== Shareholders ==
Pars Aryan Investment Company is currently the largest shareholder of the company having 13.99% of the bank's shares. However, the bank holds about 55,264 other shareholders (both real and legal) based on the bank's annual report of fiscal year 2014/2015. The combination of the bank's shareholders comes as follows:

Entity	Real	Legal
Number of shareholders (%)	49,883 (99,27%)	382 (0.76%)
Number of shares (%)	6,527,369,225 (21.76%)	23,472,630,775 (78.24%)
Total	55,265 (100%)	30,000,000,000 (100%)

shareholders also have witnessed a constant growth in their equity since the Fiscal year 2007/2008: (Numbers in Million IRR)

Shareholders' Equity	2014/2015	2013/2014	2012/2013	2011/2012	2010/2011	2009/2010	2008/2009	2007/2008
Balance sheet quantity	67,528,074	52,485,378	48,109,735	38,416,498	31,387,403	12,353,712	10,129,926	7,096,491
Growth Rate	28.66%	9.09%	25.23%	31.31%	154.07%	21.95%	42.75%	63.59%

Bank Pasargad's Khovardin branch in Tehran

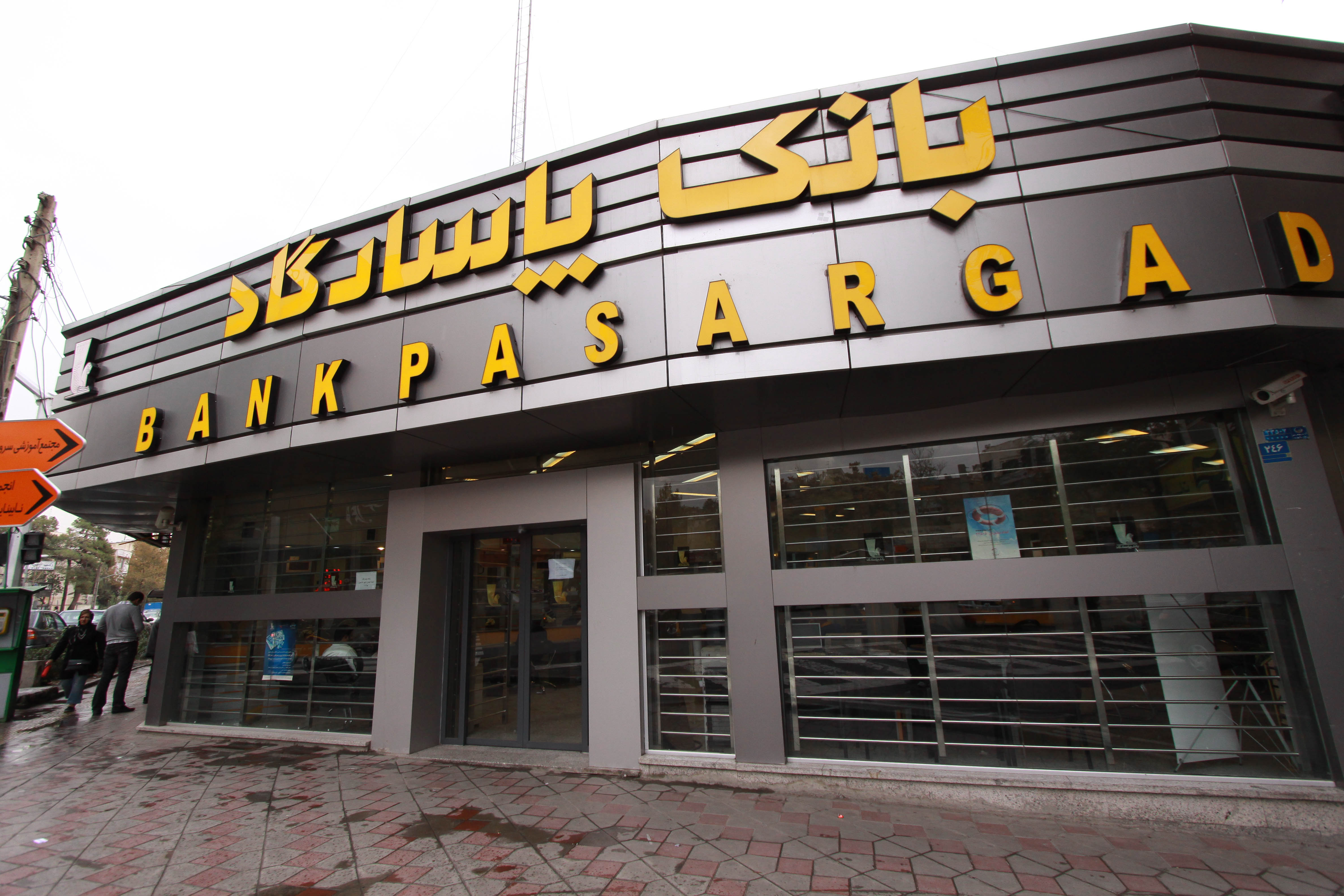
Bank Pasargad's Kolahdouz St. branch in Tehran

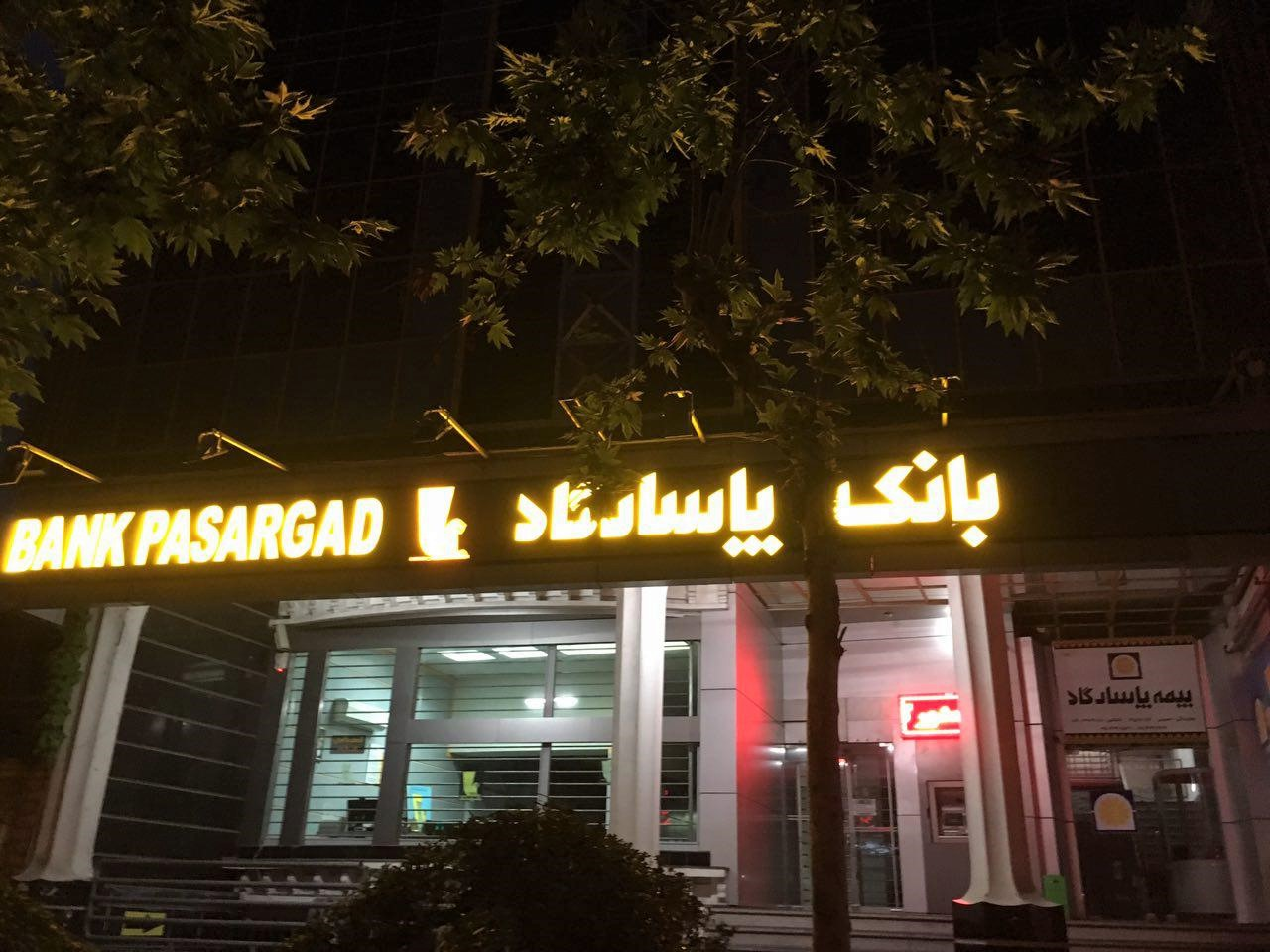
Bank Pasargad's branch in Amol

== Financial Ratios ==
Ratio	As on March 20, 2012	As on March 20, 2013	As on March 20, 2014	As on March 20, 2015
Capital Adequacy Ratio (CAR)	23.12%	21.47%	18.85%	19.84%
Return on assets (ROA)	4.91%	5.11%	4.65%	3.08%
Return on equity (ROE)	28.18%	31.72%	32.11%	21.07%
Earnings Per Share (EPS)	IRR 360.85	IRR 441.55	IRR 522.29	IRR 301.02
Price–earnings ratio (P/E)	5.14	3.55	4.98	5.96

== Corporate governance ==
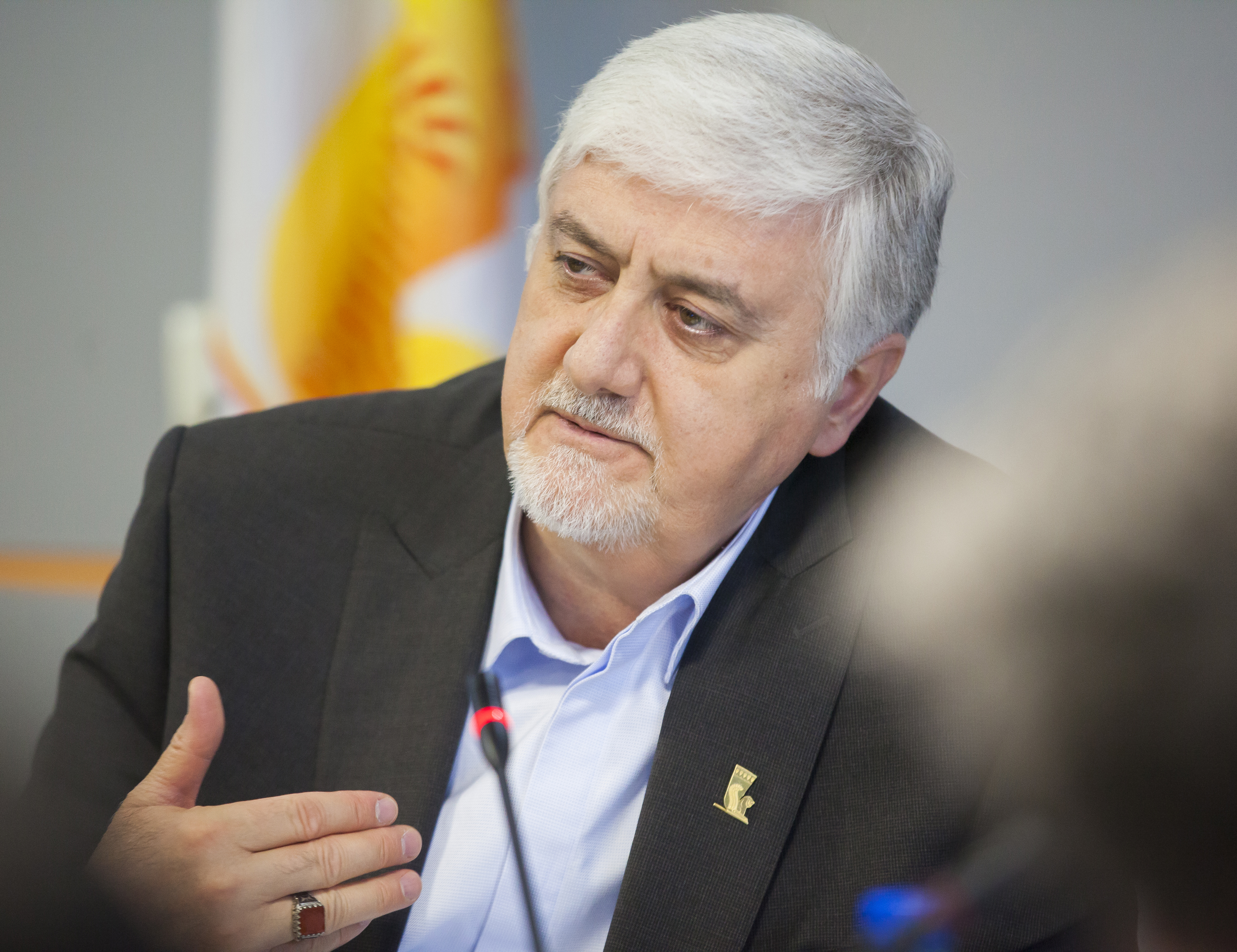
Majid Ghassemi, the Bank's CEO in 2015

- Majid Ghassemi - Vice Chairman and CEO 2005–present

== Branding ==
The bank's brand has recognized as one of top 100 Iranian brands in the 10th Industry Champions of Iran Festival and was registered in Swiss Federal Institute of Intellectual Property in 2015 and has been allowed to use ® on its logo. Bank Pasargad also ranked among world's top-500 banking brands, based on an annual ranking done by The Banker (a Financial Times' Affiliate) and Brand Finance in 2021. According to the ranking's details, Bank Pasargad was among the top-10 climbers in both ranking change (89 ranks upward) and brand value (with a 53% growth).

== Venture capital ==
Pishgaman Amin Sarmayeh Pasargad Company (Shenasa) was established in 2012 as a venture capital investment fund and subsidiary of Pasargad Financial Group.
