= Behesht-e Zahra =

Cemetery in Tehran

Behesht-e Zahra بهشت زهرا
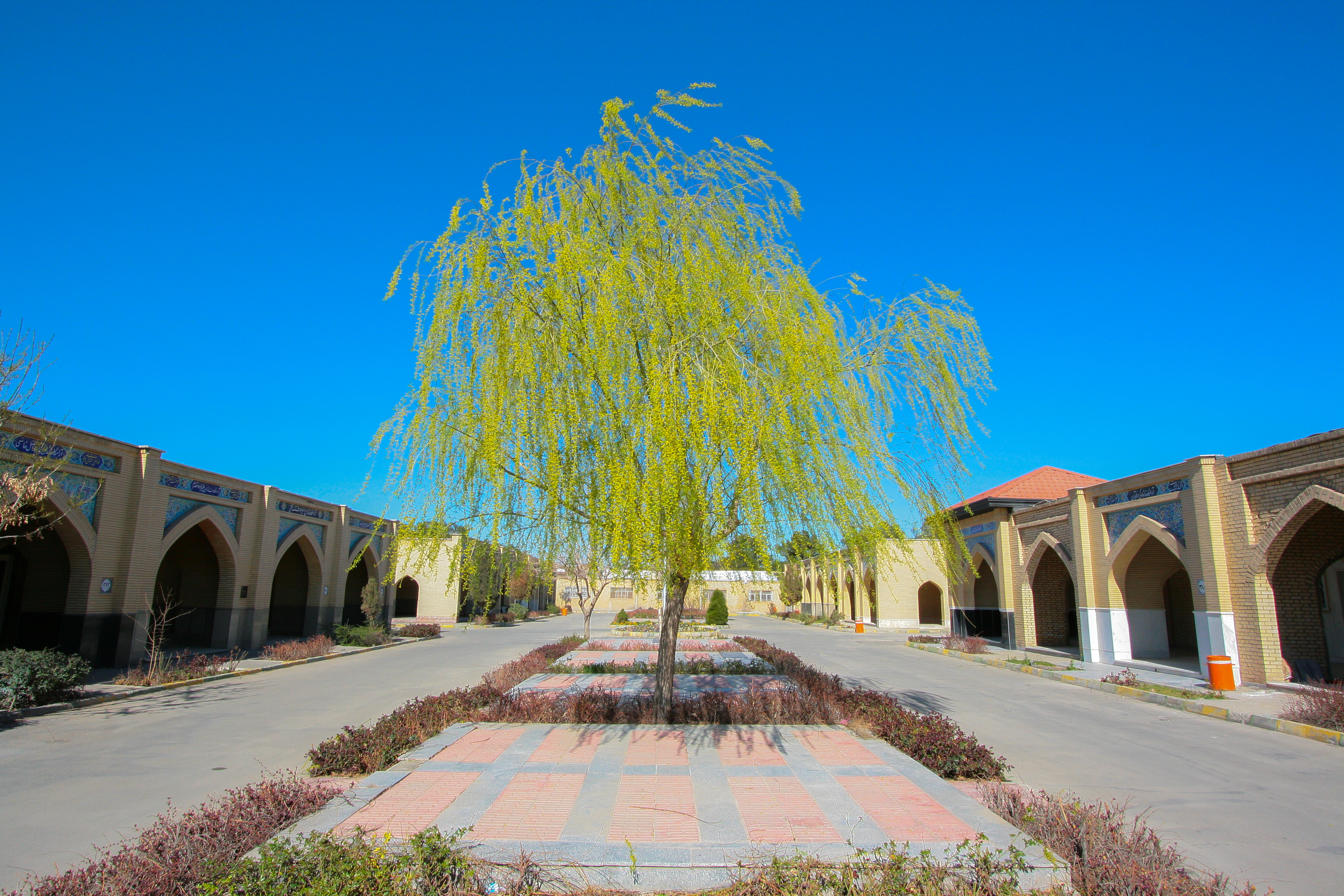
- Interactive map of Behesht-e Zahra بهشت زهرا

Details
- Established: 1970
- Location: Tehran
- Country: Iran
- Coordinates: 35.536°N 51.370°E
- Type: Public
- Size: 534 hectares (1,320 acres)
- No. of graves: 1,600,000
- Website: beheshtezahra.tehran.ir

Behesht-e Zahra (Persian: بهشت زهرا [beˈheʃtʰe zæhˈɹɒː]; lit. 'Paradise of Zahra') is the largest cemetery in Iran. Located in the southern part of metropolitan Tehran, it is connected to the city by Tehran Metro Line 1.

== History ==
In the early 1950s, all the cemeteries in Tehran were supposed to be replaced by several large new ones outside the then precincts of the capital. Behesht-e Zahra was built in late 1960s on the southern side of Tehran towards the direction of the city of Qom and opened on 29 June 1970 by mayor of Tehran, Gholamreza Nikpey.

Many of the deceased soldiers of the Iran–Iraq War were buried in the martyrs' section of the cemetery.

In 2025, satellite pictures emerged showing the cemetery's Lot 41, where victims of mass executions that occurred following the Iranian Revolution are buried, being paved over and converted into a parking area.

== Notable burials ==
=== Royalty ===
- Prince Abdol-Ali Mirzā Farmān Farmāiān (1935–1973) – industrialist and nobleman
- Badr-ol-Moluk Vālā (1895–1979) – wife of Ahmad Shah Qajar
- Princess Ezzosaltaneh Qājār (1891–1984) – daughter of Naser al-Din Shah Qajar
- Princess Irāndokht Qājār (1915–1984) – daughter of Ahmad Shah Qajar
- Princess Sadigheh Pahlavi (1916–1990) – daughter of Reza Shah
- Prince Hamid-Rezā Pahlavi (1932–1992) – youngest son of Reza Shah
- Esmat Dowlatshāhi (1904–1995) – Reza Shah's wife

=== Politicians (Pahlavi Era) ===
- Sādegh Rezāzādeh Shafagh (1895–1971) – politician and scholar
- Saeid Mālek Loqmān ol-Molk (1888–1972) – minister of health (1944–48) and senator
- Abdolrahmān Farāmarzi (1897–1972) – politician
- Hossein Navāb (1897–1972) – minister of foreign affairs (1952)
- Ebrāhim Kāshāni (1903–1972) – governor of the Central Bank
- Mozaffar A'lam (1882–1973) – politician
- Mohammad Sā'ed Sā'ed ol-Vozarā (1883–1973) – prime minister of Iran (1944) and (1948–50)
- Ahmad Ārāmesh (1908–1973) – minister of labour (1946–47)
- Rezā Tajaddod (1888–1974) – politician
- Abdolqādir Āzād (1891–1974) – politician
- Aligholi Hedāyat (1898–1974) – senator
- Mohammad-Ali Keshavārz Sadr Bahādor ol-Molk (1902–1974) – politician
- Hājar Tarbiat (1906–1974) – senator
- Ahmad Ali Sepehr (1889–1975) – politician and historian
- Nāser Āmeri (1928–1975) – politician
- Mohammad-Ali Dādvar (1903–1977) – politician
- Ahmad Bahādori (1911–1977) – senator
- Jahānshāh Samsām (1911–1977) – senator
- Mahmoud Jalili (1912–1977) – senator
- Amir-Abbās Hoveydā (1919–1979) – prime minister of Iran (1965–77) and leader of Rastakhiz party
- Mahmoud Jafariān (1928–1979) – director-general of National Iranian Radio and Television (NIRT)
- Gholāmhossein Dāneshi (fa) (1936–1979) – politician
- Parviz Nikkhāh (1939–1979) – politician
- Sālār Jāff (fa) (1940–1979) – politician
- Najafgholi Moezzi Hesām od-Dowleh (fa) (1886–1980) – politician
- Habibollāh Amouzgār (fa) (1890–1980) – minister of education (1951) and senator
- Abolqāsem Najm (1892–1980) – minister of foreign affairs (1945–46)
- Nasrollāh Entezām (1900–1980) – diplomat
- Hossein-Ali Rāshed (fa) (1905–1980) – politician
- Farrokhroo Pārsā (1922–1980) – minister of education (1968–71)
- Anoushirvān Sepahbodi (1888–1981) – diplomat and minister of foreign affairs (1947)
- Javād Āmeri (1891–1981) – politician
- Allāh-Yār Sāleh (1897–1981) – diplomat and politician
- Abdolbāghi Shoāei (fa) (1903–1982) – minister of finance (1960–62)
- Mehdi Mashāyekhi (fa) (1905–1985) – mayor of Tehran (1945–46)
- Abbās Ārām (1906–1985) – minister of foreign affairs (1959–66)
- Shams Qanatābādi (fa) (1914–1987) – politician
- Amir-Teymour Kalāli (1894–1988) – minister of interior (1949–51)
- Ebrāhim Fakhrāei (fa) (1899–1988) – politician
- Zeynolābedin Rahnamā (fa) (1890–1989) – politician
- Mohammad Ali Vārasteh (1896–1989) – politician
- Hossein Joudat (1892–1990) – politician
- Kāzem Hassibi (1906–1990) – politician
- Jahāngir Tafazzoli (1914–1990) – politician
- Shamseddin Amir-Alāei (1900–1994) – diplomat and politician
- Mehdi Āzar (1901–1994) – minister of education (1952–53)
- Ahmad Hooman (1909–1995) – minister of imperial court (1951)
- Azizollāh Malek-Esmāili (fa) (1903–1996) – politician
- Jahanshah Saleh (1905–1996) – physician and politician
- Jalāl Abdoh (1909–1996) – diplomat
- Nosratollāh Kāsemi (fa) (1911–1996) – politician
- Parvin Soufi (fa) (d. 1997) – politician
- Vajihollāh Fāzel (fa) (1907–1998) – senator
- Gholāmali Farivar (1905–1998) – minister of industries and mines (1961)
- Shams-ol-Molouk Mosāheb (1922–1998) – senator
- Abolfazl Ghāzi (fa) (1931–1998) – minister of higher education (1978)
- Mehrangiz Manouchehriān (1906–2000) – lawyer and senator
- Hassan Shālchiān (1911–2000) – minister of roads and transportation
- Javād Sadr (1912–2000) – minister of interior (1963–66)
- Abolghāsem Tafazzoli (fa) (1921–2004) – politician
- Sabār Farmānfarmāiān (1912–2006) – minister of health (1953)
- Amir-Nosratollāh Bālākhānlou (1917–2007) – politician
- Mohammad-Ali Safi-Asfiā (1913–2008) – chief of Planning and Budget Organization (1962–68)
- Kāzem Oskouei (fa) (1919–2009) – politician
- Mohammad-Rezā Jalāli Nāeini (fa) (1916–2010) – senator
- Masoud Borzin (fa) (1920–2010) – director-general of NIRT
- Hassan-Ali Sāremi Kalāli (fa) (1926–2011) – politician
- Manouchehr Āgah (fa) (1930–2012) – politician
- Yahyā Sādeq Vaziri (1911–2013) – minister of justice (1979)
- Rahim Zehtābfar (fa) (1927–2013) – politician
- Rezā Kermāni (fa) (1934–2013) – politician
- Manouchehr Saeid Vaziri (fa) (1920–2014) – politician
- Hossein Falsafi (fa) (1919–2015) – politician
- Karim Mo'tamedi (fa) (1928–2018) – minister of communications (1974–79)
- Iskander Mirza (1899-69) - Pakistani Politician (1956-58)

=== Military personnel ===
- Mohammad-Ali Vājed 'Sālār Motazed' (fa) (1886–1975) – IIA general
- Rezā Zandipour (fa) (1923–1975) – IIA general
- Ahmad Mogharebi (de) (1921–1977) – IIA general
- Marzieh Arfa (1901–1978) – physician and IIA general
- Nematollāh Nassiri (1910–1979) – Imperial Iranian Army (IIA) general and head of SAVAK (1965–78)
- Jafarqoli Sadri (fa) (1911–1979) – head of National Police
- Fakhr Modarres (fa) (1917–1979) – IIA general
- Mehdi Rahimi (1921–1979) – IIA general
- Parviz Amini Afshār (1921–1979) – IIA general
- Rezā Nāji (1923–1979) – IIA general
- Manouchehr Khosrowdād (1927–1979) – Imperial Iranian Army Aviation general
- Nāder Jahānbāni (1928–1979) – Imperial Iranian Air Force (IIAF) general
- Amir-Hossein Rabiei (1931–1979) – commander in chief of IIAF (1977–79)
- Houshang Hātam (1918–1980) – IIA general
- Said Mehdiyoun (1928–1980) – IIAF general
- Āyat Mohaqeqi (1931–1980) – IIAF general
- Ali Eghbāli Dogāhe (1949–1980) – IIAF pilot
- Farrokhzād Jahāngiri (fa) (1950–1980) – IIAF pilot
- Ahmad Keshvari (1953–1980) – IRIA pilot
- Houshang Vahid Dastjerdi (fa) (1925–1981) – head of National Police
- Valiollāh Fallāhi (1931–1981) – chief of staff of Islamic Republic of Iran Army (IRIA)
- Javād Fakoori (1938–1981) – chief of staff of Islamic Republic of Iran Air Force (IRIAF)
- Hemmatollāh Pahlavān (fa) (1906–1982) – IIA general
- Mahmoud Mirjalāli (fa) (1898–1983) – IIA general
- Mir-Mohammad Mohannā (fa) (1901–1983) – commander in chief of IIAF (1948–49)
- Hedayatollāh Gilānshāh (1907–1986) – commander in chief of IIAF
- Hassan Aghāreb Parast (1946–1984) – IRIA general
- Masoud Monfared Niāki (1929–1985) – IRIA general
- Hassan Ābshenāsān (1936–1985) – IRIA general
- Hossein Khal'atbari (1949–1985) – IRIAF pilot
- Abdolbāghi Darvish (1948–1986) – IRIAF pilot
- Hossein Fardoust (1917–1987) – IIA general and deputy head of SAVAK
- Mohammad-Ali Saffāri (fa) (1898–1988) – head of National Police and senator
- Bahrām Hooshyār (1938–1991) – IRIAF pilot
- Sādegh Amirazizi (1905–1992) – IIA general
- Mansour Sattāri (1948–1995) – chief of staff of IRIAF
- Alirezā Yāsini (fa) (1951–1995) – IRIAF pilot
- Ali Sayād Shirāzi (1944–1999) – chief of staff of IRIA
- Qāsem-Ali Zahirnejād (1924–1999) – chief of staff of IRIA
- Jalil Zandi (1951–2001) – IRIAF ace fighter pilot
- Ezzatollāh Zarghāmi (1908–2004) – IIA general
- Mohammad-Hādi Shādmehr (1920–2008) – chief of staff of IRIA
- Gholāmrezā Ghāsemi (fa) (1930–2012) – IRIA general
- Mortezā Bāyandariān (fa) (1940–2012) – IRIA general
- Siābakhsh Nassiri Zibā (fa) (1935–2013) – IRIA general
- Mohammad-Hossein Moeinpour (1934–2014) – chief of staff of IRIAF (1981–83)
- Asghar Imāniān (1929–2015) – chief of staff of IRIAF (1979)
- Abolfath Yāftābādi (fa) (1930–2015) – IRIAF general
- Mohammad Salimi (1937–2016) – chief of staff of IRIA
- Behrouz Soleimānjāh (fa) (1938–2016) – IRIA general
- Mohsen Gheytāslou (1990–2016) – member of IRIA Special Forces
- Manouchehr Najafdari (fa) (1931–2017) – head of National Police
- Ali Razmi (fa) (1933–2017) – IRIA general
- Ali-Akbar Mousavi Ghavidel (fa) (1937–2017) – IRIA general
- Cyrus Lotfi (fa) (1935–2018) – IRIA general
- Dāriush Zarghāmi (fa) (1940–2018) – IRIN commando
- Nāsser Farbod (1922–2019) – chief of staff of IRIA (1979)
- Houshang Seddigh (1941–2020) – chief of staff of IRIAF (1983–86)
- Amanollāh Mortazavi (fa) (1949–2020) – head of National Police
- Samad Bālāzādeh (fa) (1953–2020) – IRIAF pilot
- Manouchehr Mohagheghi (fa) (1943–2021) – IRIAF pilot
- Nāsser Mohammadifar (1945–2026) – IRIA general

=== Political dissidents ===
- Ali-Akbar Safāei Farāhāni (fa) (1939–1971) – Marxist activist
- Behrouz Dehqāni (fa) (1939–1971) – Marxist activist
- Ali-Rezā Nābdel (1944–1971) – Marxist activist
- Saeed Mohsen (1939–1972) – Marxist activist
- Mohammad Hanifnejād (1940–1972) – Marxist activist
- Ali-Asghar Badiezādegān (1940–1972) – Marxist activist
- Masoud Ahmadzādeh (1945–1972) – Marxist activist
- Mehdi Rezāei (fa) (1952–1972) – Marxist activist
- Khosrow Golsorkhi (1944–1974) – Marxist activist
- Marzieh Ahmadi (1945–1974) – Marxist activist
- Shirin Moāzed (fa) (1945–1974) – Marxist activist
- Kerāmatollāh Dāneshiān (1944–1974) – Marxist activist
- Bijan Jazani (1938–1975) – Marxist activist
- Hassan Ziā-Zarifi (1939–1975) – Marxist activist
- Majid Sharif Vāghefi (1948–1975) – Marxist activist
- Mohammad Nakhshab (fa) (1923–1976) – Marxist activist
- Mostafā Shoāiyān (1936–1976) – Marxist activist
- Hamid Ashraf (1946–1976) – Marxist activist
- Abbās-Ali Panbehi (1897–1977) – Marxist activist
- Rezā Ostād-Hassan-Bannā (fa) (1922–1978) – protester
- Ali Andarzgou (fa) (1937–1978) – Islamist activist
- Kāmrān Nejātollāhi (fa) (1953–1978) – scholar'
- Javād Zabihi (1930–1980) – scholar
- Ali Shāyegān (1901–1981) – member of the National Front
- Ebrāhim Karimābādi (1917–1981) – member of the National Front
- Karim Keshāvarz (ru) (1900–1986) – member of Tudeh Party
- Mozzafar Baghāei (1911–1987) – leader of Toilers Party of the Iranian Nation
- Ehsān Tabari (1917–1989) – member of Tudeh Party
- Ali-Akbar Saeidi Sirjāni (1931–1994) – journalist
- Ahmad Zirakzādeh (1907–1993) – member of the National Front
- Abolfazl Qāsemi (1921–1993) – member of the National Front
- Homā Dārābi (1940–1994) – pediatrician
- Ebrāhim Zālzādeh (1948–1997) – author
- Dāriush Forouhar (1928–1998) – founder of Nation Party of Iran
- Parvāneh Forouhar (1938–1998) – politician
- Majid Sharif (1950–1998) – journalist
- Hossein Makki (1911–1999) – member of the National Front
- Noureddin Kiānouri (1915–1999) – Marxist activist and general secretary of Tudeh Party
- Ali Ardalān (1914–2000) – politician and member of the National Front
- Asghar Pārsā (1919–2007) – member of the National Front
- Parviz Varjāvand (1934–2007) – scholar and member of the National Front
- Zahrā Bani-Yaghoub (1980–2007) – physician
- Majid Kāvousifar (1979–2007) – assassin
- Maryam Firouz (1914–2008) – member of Tudeh party
- Ali Mousavi (1966–2009) – protester
- Mehdi Farhādi-Rād (fa) (1971–2009) – protester
- Shabnam Sohrābi (fa) (1975–2009) – protester
- Omid-Rezā Mirsayāfi (1980–2009) – blogger
- Neda Āghā-Soltān (1983–2009) – protester
- Rāmin Pourandarjāni (1983–2009) – physician
- Mohammad-Hossein Feyz (fa) (1983–2009) – protester
- Mostafā Karimbeigi (1983–2009) – protester
- Mohsen Rouholamini (1984–2009) – protester
- Shāhrokh Rahmāni (fa) (1984–2009) – protester
- Ahmad Nejāti Kārgar (fa) (1987–2009) – protester
- Ashkān Sohrābi (fa) (1990–2009) – protester
- Meysam Ebādi (fa) (1990–2009) – protester
- Sohrāb A'rābi (1990–2009) – protester
- Mohammad Kāmrāni (fa) (1991–2009) – protester
- Mostafā Kāshāni Rasā (fa) (d. 2009) – protester
- Abdoulrezā Soudbakhsh (1950–2010) – physician
- Siāmak Pourzand (1931–2011) – journalist
- Hodā Sāber (1959–2011) – journalist
- Mohammad Mokhtāri (1989–2011) – protester
- Farideh Māshini (1960–2012) – feminist
- Mohsen Amiraslāni (1977–2014) – psychoanalyst
- Farshid Hakki (1974–2018) – political activist
- Rezā Owtādi (fa) (1992–2018) – protester
- Ali-Rezā Shir-Mohammad-Ali (1998–2019) – political activist
- Niktā Esfandāni (2005–2019) – protester
- Mohammad Maleki (1933–2020) – member of the National Front
- Ruhollāh Zam (1978–2020) – journalist
- Khosrow Seif (fa) (1934–2021) – member of the National Front
- Ali-Rezā Khoshkār Bayāti (fa) (1991–2022) – protester
- Mohsen Shekāri (2000–2022) – protester
- Sadaf Movahedi (fa) (2003–2022) – protester
- Hamid-Rezā Rouhi (fa) (2003–2022) – protester
- Yaldā Āghāfazli (fa) (2003–2022) – protester
- Ārnikā Ghāem-Maghāmi (fa) (2005–2022) – protester
- Siāvash Mahmoudi (fa) (2006–2022) – protester
- Ārmitā Gerāvand (2006–2023) – protester
- Kiānush Sanjari (1982–2024) – journalist
- Mohammad Ghobādlou (2000–2024) – protester

=== Politicians (Islamic Republic) ===
- Mahmoud Tāleghāni (1911–1979) – cleric and a founder of Freedom Movement of Iran
- Asghar Vesāli (1950–1980) – member of IRGC
- Mohammad-Hossein Fahmideh (1967–1980) – member of IRGC
- Hassan Lāhouti (fa) (1927–1981) – politician
- Mohammad Beheshti (1928–1981) – chief justice of Iran (1979–81) and head of Islamic Republic Party (IRP)
- Mostafā Chamrān (1932–1981) – minister of defence
- Mohammad-Javād Bāhonar (1933–1981) – prime minister of Iran (1981)
- Mohammad-Ali Rajāei (1933–1981) – prime minister (1980–81) and president of Iran (1981)
- Mohammad-Ali Fayyāzbakhsh (fa) (1937–1981) – politician
- Mousā Nāmjoo (1938–1981) – minister of defence (1981)
- Hassan Āyat (1938–1981) – member of IRP
- Hassan Abbāspour (1944–1981) – minister of energy
- Mohammad Montazeri (1944–1981) – cleric
- Mahmoud Ghandi (1945–1981) – minister of communication
- Yousef Kolāhdouz (1946–1981) – member of IRGC
- Hassan Azodi (fa) (1946–1981) – politician
- Mousā Kalāntari (1949–1981) – minister of housing (1980–81)
- Mohammad Kachouei (fa) (1950–1981) – warden of Evin Prison
- Mohammad Jahānārā (fa) (1954–1981) – member of Islamic Revolutionary Guard Corps (IRGC)
- Mohsen Vezvāei (1960–1982) – member of IRGC
- Mohammad Boroujerdi (1955–1983) – member of IRGC
- Hassan Bāgheri (1956–1983) – member of IRGC
- Mehdi Shāhābādi (fa) (1930–1984) – member of Majles
- Mohammad-Ebrāhim Hemmat (1955–1984) – member of IRGC
- Mojtabā Hāshemi (de) (1940–1985) – head of Islamic Revolution Committees
- Mahmoud Kāveh (1961–1986) – member of IRGC
- Kāzem Sāmi (1935–1988) – minister of health (1979)
- Ruhollāh Khomeini (1902–1989) – cleric and supreme leader of the Islamic Republic of Iran (1979–1989)
- Asadollāh Mobāsheri (1909–1990) – minister of justice
- Mohammad-Javād Tondguyān (1938–1991) – minister of petroleum
- Mortezā Āvini (1947–1993) – war photographer
- Ahmad Khomeini (1945–1995) – cleric and politician
- Asadollāh Lājevardi (1935–1998) – warden of Evin Prison
- Seifollāh Vahid Dastjerdi (1926–1999) – head of Iranian Red Crescent Society
- Saied Emāmi (1958–1999) – deputy minister of intelligence
- Ali-Akbar Aboutorābi-Fard (1939–2000) – member of Majles
- Hossein Āyatollāhi (1931–2001) – cleric
- Taghi Ebtekār (fa) (1932–2001) – head of department of environment (1979–80)
- Rahmān Dādmān (1956–2001) – minister of roads and transportation
- Habibollāh Dāvarān (fa) (1926–2003) – politician
- Mohsen Nourbakhsh (1948–2003) – governor of the Central Bank
- Mohammad Abāei Khorāsāni (1940–2004) – cleric
- Rezā Zavāre'i (1938–2005) – politician
- Hossein Hamadāni (1950–2005) – member of IRGC
- Hamid Taqavi (1959–2005) – member of IRGC
- Masoud Ahmadi Moghaddasi (1963–2005) – judge
- Nematollāh Sālehi Najafābādi (1923–2006) – cleric
- Taghi Khāmoushi (1937–2006) – politician
- Serājeddin Kāzerouni (fa) (1947–2006) – minister of housing (1984–93)
- Jamāl Karimi-Rād (1956–2006) – minister of justice
- Ahmad Kāzemi (1958–2006) – member of IRGC
- Fakhreddin Hejāzi (1929–2007) – member of Majles
- Bahāeddin Adab (1945–2007) – member of Majles
- Mohammad-Rezā Tavassoli (1931–2008) – cleric
- Ahmad Bourghāni (1959–2008) – member of Majles
- Khadijeh Saqafi (1913–2009) – Khomeini's wife
- Ali Golzādeh Ghafouri (1923–2010) – cleric
- Abbās-Ali Amid Zanjāni (1937–2011) – cleric
- Hassan Tehrāni-Moghaddam (1959–2011) – member of IRGC
- Maryam Behrouzi (1945–2012) – member of Majles
- Hassan Habibi (1937–2013) – vice president
- Habibollāh Asgarolādi (1932–2013) – minister of commerce (1981–83)
- Hamid Taqavi (1955–2014) – member of IRGC
- Mostafā Dāvoudi (fa) (1939–2015) – chairman of National Sports Organisation (1981–83)
- Sādeq Tabātabāei (1943–2015) – deputy prime minister (1979)
- Hossein Hamadāni (1950–2015) – member of IRGC
- Gholāmhossein Shokouhi (1926–2016) – minister of education (1979)
- Mostafā Katirāei (1928–2016) – minister of housing (1979)
- Hossein Shāh-Hosseini (1928–2017) – chairman of Physical Education Organization (1979)
- Jafar Shojouni (1932–2016) – cleric
- Marzieh Hadidchi (1939–2016) – member of Majles
- Akbar Hāshemi Rafsanjāni (1934–2017) – president of Iran (1989–1997)
- Ali Shariatmadāri (1924–2017) – minister of culture (1979)
- Ebrāhim Yazdi (1931–2017) – minister of foreign affairs (1979)
- Dāvoud Ahmadinejād (1950–2017) – politician
- Shahlā Habibi (1958–2017) – politician
- Ali-Akbar Moeinfar (1928–2018) – minister of petroleum (1979)
- Abbās Amir-Entezām (1932–2018) – deputy prime minister (1979)
- Mohammad Bastenegār (1941–2018) – politician
- Abbās Duzduzāni (1942–2018) – minister of culture (1980–81)
- Asadollāh Asgarolādi (1933–2019) – businessman
- Azam Tāleghāni (1943–2019) – member of Majles
- Mohammad-Nabi Habibi (1945–2019) – mayor of Tehran (1984–87)
- Mohammad Ahmadiān (1956–2019) – politician
- Ahad Gudarziāni (1969–2019) – journalist
- Mohammad Kiāvash (1930–2020) – member of Majles
- Gholām-Abbās Tavassoli (1935–2020) – politician
- Mousā Zargar (1935–2020) – minister of health (1979–80)
- Mohammad Mirmohammadi (1949–2020) – member of Expediency Discernment Council
- Hossein Sheikholeslām (1952–2020) – politician
- Hossein Kāzempour Ardebili (1952–2020) – politician
- Mohammad-Rezā Rāhchamani (1952–2020) – member of Majles
- Nāsser Shabāni (1952–2020) – member of IRGC
- Ali-Asghar Zārei (1956–2020) – member of IRGC
- Hassan Zāre Dehnavi (1956–2020) – prosecutor
- Hamid Kahrām (1958–2020) – member of Majles
- Fātemeh Rahbar (1964–2020) – member of Majles
- Mohammad-Rezā Najafi (1969–2020) – member of Majles
- Mohammad-Hādi Nejādhosseiniān (1946–2021) – minister of industries (1989–94)
- Hassan Tarighat Monfared (1946–2021) – minister of health (2012–13)
- Akbar Torkān (1952–2021) – minister of roads and transportation (1989–93)
- Nāder Shariatmadāri (1960–2021) – politician
- Mohammad-Rezā Madhi (1969–2021) – member of IRGC
- Ali Tehrāni (1926–2022) – cleric
- Abbās Sheibāni (1931–2022) – politician
- Mortezā Mohammadkhān (1946–2022) – minister of commerce (1993–97)
- Esmāil Jabbārzādeh (1960–2022) – member of Majles
- Rostam Ghāsemi (1964–2022) – minister of petroleum (2011–13)
- Hassan Sayyād Khodāei (1972–2022) – member of IRGC
- Emād Afroogh (1957–2023) – member of Majles
- Alirezā Akbari (1961–2023) – politician
- Hamid Behbahāni (1941–2024) – minister of roads and transportation (2008–11)
- Parviz Dāvoodi (1952–2024) – vice president
- Zahrā Shojāei (1956–2024) – politician
- Mohammad-Hādi Hāj-Rahimi (de) (1962–2024) – member of IRGC
- Hassan Mohaghegh (1951–2025) – member of IRGC
- Alirezā Afshār (1951–2025) – member of IRGC
- Mohammad Bāgheri (1960–2025) – member of IRGC
- Gholāmrezā Mehrābi (1961–2025) – member of IRGC
- Mehdi Rabbāni (1962–2025) – member of IRGC
- Amir-Ali Hājizādeh (1962–2025) – member of IRGC
- Isār Tabātabāi Qomsheh (1981–2025) – member of IRGC
- Kamal Kharazi (1944–2026) – minister of foreign affairs (1997–2005)
- Rezā Mozaffariniā (1959–2026) – member of IRGC
- Jamshid Eshāghi (1961–2026) – member of IRGC
- Bahrām Hosseini Motlagh (1963–2026) – member of IRGC
- Aziz Nasirzādeh (1964–2026) – minister of defence (2024–26)

=== Scholars and journalists ===
- Abbās Khalili (1895–1972) – journalist, diplomat
- Abdolhossein Sanatizādeh (ru) (1895–1973) – novelist
- Hushang Irāni (1925–1973) – poet
- Mohammad Hejāzi (1900–1974) – writer
- Mojtabā Minovi (1903–1976) – scholar
- Abdolhossein Mirsepāsi (fa) (1907–1976) – scholar
- Mohsen Hashtroodi (1908–1976) – scholar
- Masih Dāneshvari (fa) (1899–1977) – scholar
- Isā Sedigh (1894–1978) – scholar and founder of the University of Tehran
- Mohammad Parvin Gonābādi (1903–1978) – scholar
- Fakhr-Āfāgh Pārsā (1898–1979) – journalist and activist
- Gholāmhossein Mosāheb (1910–1979) – scholar
- Hassan Amid (1910–1979) – lexicographer
- Khadijeh Afzal Vaziri (1889–1981) – journalist
- Isā Behnām (fa) (1906–1984) – scholar
- Enāyatollāh Shakibāpour (fa) (1907–1984) – translator
- Habib Nafisi (1908–1984) – scholar and founder of the Tehran Polytechnic
- Āzar Andāmi (1926–1984) – physician
- Bahrām Sādeghi (1937–1984) – writer
- Zabihollāh Mansouri (fa) (1899–1986) – translator
- Noor-ol-Hodā Mangeneh (1902–1986) – author
- Habib Sāher (1903–1988) – writer
- Hassan Sajjādinejād (fa) (1918–1988) – scholar
- Ganjali Sabāhi (1906–1989) – writer
- Firouz Shirvānlou (fa) (1938–1989) – scholar
- Abbās Nalbandiān (1949–1989) – playwright
- Ali-Akbar Siāssi (1896–1990) – scholar and politician
- Parviz Nātel Khānlari (1914–1990) – linguist and scholar
- Mehrdād Avestā (1930–1991) – poet
- Abolghāsem Hālat (fa) (1914–1992) – writer
- Bahrām Farahvashi (fa) (1925–1992) – scholar
- Ahmad Fardid (1909–1994) – philosopher
- Mehrdād Bahār (1930–1994) – linguist
- Esfandiār Esfandiāri (es) (1910–1995) – scholar
- Mohammad-Javād Mashkour (fa) (1918–1995) – scholar
- Abbās Zaryāb (1919–1995) – scholar
- Mohammad-Taqi Dāneshpajouh (1911–1996) – scholar
- Karim Fakoor (fa) (1926–1996) – poet
- Khānbābā Bayāni (fa) (1909–1997) – scholar and founder of the University of Azarabadegan
- Ahmad Tafazzoli (1937–1997) – scholar
- Ahmad Ārām (1904–1998) – scholar
- Hamid Mosadegh (1940–1998) – poet
- Mahmoud Sāremi (1968–1998) – journalist
- Nasrollāh Khādem (1910–1999) – scholar
- Mortezā Rāvandi (fa) (1913–1999) – scholar
- Jafar Shahri (fa) (1914–1999) – ethnographer
- Abdolhossein Zarrinkoob (1923–1999) – scholar
- Abdollāh Sheibāni (fa) (1903–2000) – scholar
- Mahmoud Mosāheb (fa) (1912–2000) – scholar
- Abbās Sahāb (1921–2000) – scholar
- Parviz Shāpour (1924–2000) – writer and satirist
- Bijan Jalāli (1927–2000) – poet
- Fereydoun Moshiri (1926–2000) – poet
- Parviz Dāriush (fa) (1922–2001) – poet
- Yahyā Zokā (fa) (1923–2001) – scholar
- Amir-Hossein Āryānpour (1925–2001) – lexicographer
- Gholāmhossein Āhani (fa) (1927–2001) – scholar
- Ahmad Birashk (fa) (1907–2002) – scholar
- Yahyā Adl (1908–2002) – physician
- Cherāgh-Ali Azami (fa) (1924–2002) – scholar
- Mostafā Rahimi (fa) (1926–2002) – scholar
- Khosrow Shāhāni (uk) (1929–2002) – writer
- Rezā Beykzādeh (1946–2002) – journalist
- Farrokh Tamimi (fa) (1933–2002) – poet
- Iraj Bastāmi (1957–2003) – poet
- Abdolhossein Navāei (fa) (1924–2004) – scholar
- Kioumars Sāberi Foumani (1941–2004) – satirist
- Hassan Hosseini (sr) (1956–2004) – poet
- Zeinolābedin Motamen (ru) (1914–2005) – scholar
- Shāhrokh Meskoob (1924–2005) – scholar
- Esmāil Navvāb-Safā (fa) (1925–2005) – poet
- Fazlollāh Akbari (fa) (1925–2005) – scholar
- Parviz Atābaki (fa) (1928–2005) – author
- Karim Emāmi (1930–2005) – translator
- Mahmoud Mosharraf Āzād Tehrāni (1933–2006) – poet
- Nowzar Parang (fa) (1937–2006) – poet
- Omrān Salāhi (fa) (1946–2006) – writer
- Houshang A'lam (fa) (1928–2007) – scholar
- Nāser Malekniā (1931–2007) – scholar
- Mehdi Ghālibāfiān (1935–2007) – scholar
- Bāgher Āyatollāhzādeh Shirāzi (1936–2007) – scholar
- Akbar Rādi (1939–2007) – playwright
- Ali-Mortezā Samsām Bakhtiāri (1945–2007) – scholar
- Fereydoun Ādamiyat (1920–2008) – historian
- Ahmad Ghahremān (1928–2008) – scholar
- Tāhereh Saffārzādeh (1936–2008) – writer
- Nāder Ebrāhimi (1936–2008) – writer
- Masoud Āzarnoush (1945–2008) – archaeologist
- Mehrān Ghāssemi (1977–2008) – journalist
- Rozā Montazemi (1921–2009) – author
- Mohammad-Amin Riāhi (1923–2009) – scholar
- Abolghāssem Masoudi (fa) (1930–2009) – journalist
- Bijan Taraghi (fa) (1930–2009) – poet
- Esmāil Fasih (fa) (1935–2009) – writer
- Mohammad-Nabi Sarbolouki (1944–2009) – scholar
- Enāyatollāh Rezā (1920–2010) – scholar
- Ali-Naghi Monzavi (de) (1923–2010) – scholar
- Seifollāh Kāmbakhsh-Fard (1929–2010) – scholar
- Rahim Rezāzādeh Malek (fa) (1940–2010) – scholar
- Shokouh Mirfattāh (1946–2010) – scholar
- Azizollāh Bayāt (fa) (1920–2011) – scholar
- Iraj Afshār (1925–2011) – bibliographer and historian
- Jahānshāh Derakhshāni (fa) (1944–2011) – scholar
- Manouchehr Vesāl (fa) (1913–2012) – scholar
- Simin Dāneshvar (1921–2012) – scholar and novelist
- Ghamar Āriyān (1922–2012) – scholar
- Ehsāan Narāghi (1926–2012) – scholar
- Parviz Rajabi (fa) (1939–2012) – scholar
- Habibollāh Hedāyat (1920–2013) – scholar
- Abdolmohammad Āyati (1926–2013) – scholar
- Bāqer Āqeli (fa) (1929–2013) – scholar
- Parvāneh Vossough (1936–2013) – physician and entrepreneur
- Mortezā Sāghebfar (fa) (1942–2013) – scholar
- Amir-Hossein Fardi (1949–2013) – writer
- Fahimeh Rahimi (fr) (1952–2013) – writer
- Mohammad-Ebrāhim Bāstāni Pārizi (1924–2014) – historian
- Simin Behbahāni (1927–2014) – poet
- Nāser Kātouziān (1931–2014) – scholar
- Mahmoud Tolouei (fa) (1930–2015) – historian
- Mohammad-Ali Sepānlou (1940–2015) – poet
- Nāser Pourpirār (1940–2015) – writer
- Hassan Tavanāyān-Fard (1943–2015) – scholar
- Shahriār Adl (de) (1944–2015) – scholar
- Mortezā Sohrābi (fa) (1946–2015) – scholar
- Hamid Golpirā (1960–2015) – journalist
- Dāvoud Pārsāpajouh (1941–2015) – scholar
- Amir Ashiri (fa) (1925–2016) – writer
- Abolhassan Najafi (1929–2016) – scholar
- Houshang Mahdavi (fa) (1930–2016) – writer
- Hassan Farsām (1932–2016) – scholar
- Poorān Farrokhzād (1933–2016) – writer
- Abbās Shafiei (1937–2016) – scholar
- Ghāsem Hāsheminejād (1940–2016) – poet
- Atāollāh Behmanesh (1923–2017) – journalist
- Habibollāh Chāichiān (1923–2017) – poet
- Hossein Towfigh (1929–2017) (1929–2017) – journalist
- Ali-Rezā Yaldā (1930–2017) – scholar
- Mohsen Ghānebasiri (fa) (1949–2017) – scholar
- Mediā Kāshigar (1956–2017) – writer
- Ali Moallem (fa) (1962–2017) – scholar
- Dāriush Shāyegan (1935–2018) – philosopher
- Gholāmhossein Sadri Afshār (fa) (1935–2018) – scholar
- Salim Neisāri (1920–2019) – scholar
- Yadollāh Samareh (1932–2019) – scholar
- Mohsen Abolghāsemi (fa) (1932–2019) – scholar
- Bahman Keshāvarz (fa) (1944–2019) – scholar
- Abbāsgholi Dāneshvar (fa) (1925–2020) – scholar
- Hassan Tofigh (fa) (1926–2020) – journalist
- Badrozzamān Gharib (1929–2020) – scholar
- Ahmad Niktalab (1934–2020) – poet
- Sādegh Malek Shahmirzādi (1940–2020) – scholar
- Fariborz Raisdānā (1945–2020) – scholar
- Akbar Ālemi (1945–2020) – scholar
- Gholāmrezā Sahāb (fa) (1948–2020) – scholar
- Massoud Mehrābi (1954–2020) – journalist
- Mahlaghā Mallāh (1917–2021) – scholar
- Jalāl Sattāri (1931–2021) – scholar
- Mohammad-Rezā Bāteni (1935–2021) – scholar
- Āzartāsh Āzarnoush (1938–2021) – scholar
- Hamid-Rezā Sadr (1956–2021) – journalist
- Moslem Bahādori (1927–2022) – scholar
- Nāder Tālebzādeh (1953–2022) – journalist
- Rezā Roostā Āzād (1962–2022) – scholar
- Amir-Bānoo Karimi (1931–2023) – scholar
- Shamseddin Adib-Soltāni (1931–2023) – scholar
- Ahmad-Rezā Ahmadi (1940–2023) – poet
- Alirezā Ashrafi (1964–2023) – scholar
- Ali-Akbar Sarfarāz (1927–2024) – scholar
- Karim Mojtahedi (1930–2024) – scholar
- Shahlā Lāhiji (1942–2024) – writer
- Bahrām Akāsheh (1936–2025) – scholar
- Abbās Anvāri (1936–2025) – scholar
- Ebrāhim Nabavi (1958–2025) – satirist
- Bijan Ashtari (fa) (1960–2025) – translator

=== Artists ===
- Dāvoud Pirniā (de) (1900–1971) – musician
- Saeid Hormozi (1897–1976) – musician
- Majid Vafādār (fa) (1913–1976) – musician
- Afshin Moghadam (1945–1976) – singer
- Mohammad-Ali Amir-Jāhed (fa) (1896–1977) – musician
- Hossein Nāsehi (1925–1977) – musician
- Abolhassan Etesāmi (1903–1978) – architect
- Ali-Naqi Vaziri (1886–1979) – musician
- Javād Badizādeh (fa) (1902–1979) – musician
- Gholāmali Ravānbakhsh (fa) (1935–1979) – singer
- Esmāil Adib Khānsāri (1901–1982) – musician
- Faramarz Pilaram (1937–1983) – painter
- Hossein Gol-e-Golāb (1895–1984) – poet and musician
- Mahmoud Mahmoudi Khānsāri (fa) (1934–1987) – singer
- Amanollāh Tājik (fa) (1937–1987) – singer
- Maryam Rouhparvar (fa) (1932–1988) – singer
- Ahmad Ebādi (1906–1993) – musician
- Javād Maroufi (1912–1993) – musician
- Abolhassan Sadighi (1894–1995) – painter and sculptor
- Rassām Arabzādeh (fa) (1914–1995) – carpet designer
- Heshmat Sanjari (1918–1995) – composer and conductor
- Hossein Sarshar (1934–1995) – singer and actor
- Giti Pāshāei (1940–1995) – singer
- Changiz Shahvagh (fa) (1933–1996) – painter and sculptor
- Naser Farhangfar (fr) (1947–1997) – musician
- Jalil Ziāpour (1920–1999) – painter
- Molouk Zarrābi (1907–2000) – singer
- Jafar Pourhāshemi (fa) (1928–2001) – musician
- Jahāngir Malek (fa) (1933–2002) – musician
- Asadollāh Malek (fa) (1941–2002) – musician
- Mortezā Varzi (1922–2004) – musician
- Delkash (1924–2004) – singer
- Hadi Āmeri (1913–2005) – composer and conductor
- Jafar Petgar (fa) (1920–2005) – painter
- Fereydoun Nāseri (fa) (1930–2005) – conductor
- Mojtabā Mirzādeh (1945–2005) – musician
- Ali-Akbar Sanati (ru) (1916–2006) – painter and sculptor
- Ali Tajvidi (1919–2006) – musician
- Hadi Mirmirān (1945–2006) – architect
- Bābak Bayāt (1946–2006) – musician
- Iraj Zand (fa) (1950–2006) – sculptor
- Fākhereh Sabā (1920–2007) – opera singer
- Hamid Ghanbari (fa) (1924–2007) – singer
- Parviz Yāhaghi (1936–2007) – composer
- Parivash Sotoudeh (fa) (d. 2007) – singer
- Ghorbān Soleimāni (1920–2008) – musician and vocalist
- Abbās Kātouzian (1923–2008) – painter and artist
- Khātereh Parvāneh (1929–2008) – singer
- Nikol Faridani (1935–2008) – photographer
- Shusha Guppy (1935–2008) – writer, editor and singer
- Jāzeh Tabātabāi (1938–2008) – painter
- Nāmi Petgar (fa) (1945–2008) – painter
- Mohammad-Amin Mirfenderski (fa) (1931–2009) – architect
- Farāmarz Pāyvar (1933–2009) – musician
- Hassan Shojāei (fa) (1941–2009) – singer
- Mehdi Sahābi (1944–2009) – painter and sculptor
- Abdi Yamini (fa) (1953–2009) – musician
- Parviz Meshkātiān (1955–2009) – musician
- Mohammad Nouri (1929–2010) – singer
- Bahman Jalāli (1944–2010) – photographer
- Masoud Houshmand (fa) (1946–2010) – songwriter
- Simin Aqa-Razi (1938 – 2010)
- Āndre Ārzoumāniān (Անդրե Արզումանյան) (fa) (1954–2010) – musician
- Parviz Mansouri (1925–2011) – composer
- Mahmoud Javādipour (de) (1920–2012) – painter
- Mansoureh Hosseini (1926–2012) – artist
- Behrouz Ahmadi (fa) (1946–2012) – architect
- Jalil Shahnāz (1921–2013) – musician
- Ghāsem Jebeli (fa) (1927–2013) – singer
- Dāriush Safvat (1928–2013) – musician
- Homāyoun Khorram (1930–2013) – musician
- Nima Varasteh (1979-2014) – musician
- Mortezā Pāshāei (1984–2014) – singer
- Mansour Narimān (1935–2015) – musician
- Nimā Petgar (fa) (1947–2015) – painter
- Javād Lashkari (fa) (1923–2016) – musician
- Mostafā Kamāl Pourtorāb (1924–2016) – composer
- Asghar Bichāreh (1927–2016) – photographer
- Farhang Sharif (1931–2016) – musician
- Ali-Akbar Tajvidi (1927–2017) – painter
- Nāder Golchin (fa) (1936–2017) – singer
- Hāmed Hākān (fa) (1984–2017) – singer
- Nāser Cheshmāzar (1950–2018) – musician
- Shirin Aliābādi (1973–2018) – artist
- Hossein Dehlavi (1927–2019) – composer
- Masoud Arabshāhi (1935–2019) – painter
- Farhād Ebrāhimi (1935–2019) – songwriter
- Mehrbānou Salāmi (fa) (1935–2019) – singer
- Hossein Zamarshidi (fa) (1939–2019) – architect
- Fereydoun Sadighi (fa) (1936–2020) – sculptor
- Houshang Zarif (1938–2020) – musician
- Farhād Ahmadi (fa) (1951–2020) – architect
- Abdolvahāb Shahidi (1922–2021) – singer
- Kāmbiz Derambakhsh (1942–2021) – cartoonist
- Yadollāh Maftun Amini (1926–2022) – poet
- Habibollāh Sādeghi (ru) (1951–2022) – painter
- Mohammad Esmāïli (fr) (1934–2023) – musician
- Rajab-Ali Etemādi (de) (1934–2023) – writer
- Akbar Golpāyegāni (1934–2023) – singer
- Iraj Kalāntari Tāleghāni (1937–2023) – architect
- Nasrollāh Nāsehpour (1940–2023) – musician
- Hossein Zamān (fa) (1959–2023) – singer
- Lily Afshar (1960–2023) – musician
- Khosrow Hassanzādeh (1963–2023) – painter
- Iraj Tanzifi (1938–2024) – sculptor
- Kāmrān Kātouziān (de) (1941–2025) – painter
- Fereydoon Shahbāzyān (1942–2025) – musician
- Parvāneh Etemādi (1948–2025) – painter
- Bijan Ashtari (fa) (1960–2025) – writer
- Afsāneh Malek (1942–2026) – singer

=== Actors, actresses and film directors ===
- Āzar Hekmat Shoār (1935–1974) – actress
- Mahmoud Johari (fa) (1945–1976) – actor
- Ebrāhim Morādi (1907–1977) – film director
- Akbar Meshkin (fa) (1925–1977) – actor
- Samad Sabāhi (fa) (1914–1978) – actor
- Parviz Fanizādeh (1937–1979) – actor
- Khosrow Haritāsh (1932–1980) – film director
- Esmāil Koushān (1917–1981) – film director
- Habibollāh Bolour (fa) (1913–1982) – actor and wrestler
- Mohammad-Taqi Kahnamouei (fa) (1920–1983) – actor
- Esmāil Poursaeid (fa) (1926–1983) – film director
- Abbās Mosaddegh (fa) (1926–1984) – actor
- Moezz-Divan Fekri (fa) (1900–1985) – actor and film director
- Khānbābā Motazedi (1892–1986) – film photographer
- Ātash Khayyer (fa) (1952–1986) – actress
- Esmāil Mohammadi (fa) (1910–1987) – actor
- Sāber Ātashin (fa) (1926–1987) – actor
- Roshanak Sadr (fa) (1959–1987) – actress
- Sādegh Bahrāmi (fa) (1909–1988) – actor
- Ezzatollāh Moghbeli (fa) (1933–1988) – actor
- Mohsen Badie (fa) (1908–1989) – film director
- Mahmoud Lotfi (fa) (1926–1989) – actor
- Ezzatollāh Vosough (fa) (1914–1991) – actor
- Houshang Beheshti (1923–1991) – actor
- Parviz Khatibi (fa) (1923–1993) – film director
- Siāmak Yāsemi (1925–1994) – film director
- Farhang Mehrparvar (fa) (1946–1994) – actor
- Ali Sajjādi Hosseini (1953–1994) – film director
- Roghieh Chehreh-Āzād (fa) (1907–1995) – actress
- Irān Daftari (fa) (1907–1996) – actress
- Gholamhossein Naghshineh (1908–1996) – actor
- Valiollāh Khākdān (1923–1996) – art director
- Jalāl Moghaddam (1929–1996) – film director
- Manouchehr Hāmedi (fa) (1939–1996) – actor
- Ali Hātami (1944–1996) – film director
- Rouhangiz Sāminejād (1916–1997) – actress
- Jahāngir Forouhar (1916–1997) – actor
- Ali Tābesh (fa) (1925–1997) – actor
- Fereshteh Jenābi (1948–1998) – actress
- Gholamhossein Bahmanyār (fa) (1927–1999) – actor
- Rouhollāh Emāmi (de) (1940–1999) – film editor
- Ahmad Najibzādeh (fa) (1940–1999) – screenwriter
- Ali-Asghar Garmsiri (fa) (1911–2000) – actor
- Nematollāh Gorji (1926–2000) – actor
- Mohammad-Ali Fardin (1930–2000) – actor and wrestler
- Firouz Behjat Mohammadi (fa) (1936–2000) – actor
- Roubik Mansouri (Ռուբիկ Մանսուրի) (fa) (1937–2000) – film editor
- Mahin Deyhim (fa) (1925–2001) – actress
- Jamileh Sheykhi (1930–2001) – actress
- Jamshid Mehrdād (fa) (1932–2001) – actor
- Mansour Vālāmaqām (fa) (1936–2001) – actor
- Kanaān Kiāni (fa) (1932–2002) – actor
- Parvin Malakouti (fa) (1938–2002) – actress
- Jamshid Esmāilkhāni (fa) (1950–2002) – actor
- Rezā Jiān (fa) (1949–2003) – actor
- Mehdi Fathi (1939–2004) – actor
- Mostafā Oskouei (1924–2005) – film director
- Manouchehr Nowzari (fa) (1936–2005) – actor
- Mohsen Ārāsteh (fa) (1937–2005) – actor
- Fereydoun Goleh (1942–2005) – film director
- Ali Zāhedi (fa) (1949–2005) – actor
- Bitā Tavakkoli (fa) (1994–2005) – child actress
- Jafar Bozorgi (fa) (1917–2006) – actor
- Ahmad Ghadakchiān (1920–2006) – actor
- Abdolali Homāyoun (fa) (1920–2006) – actor
- Hossein Kasbiān (fa) (1934–2006) – actor
- Soroush Khalili (fa) (1937–2006) – actor
- Vākhtāng Nersi Korkiā (fa) (1938–2006) – actor
- Hamid Rakhshāni (fa) (1951–2006) – film editor
- Poopak Goldarreh (1971–2006) – actress
- Garshā Raoufi (fa) (1933–2007) – actor
- Rasoul Mollāgholipour (1955–2007) – film director
- Esmāil Dāvarfar (1932–2008) – actor
- Khosrow Shakibāei (1944–2008) – actor
- Ahmad Āqālou (1949–2008) – actor
- Dāvoud Asadi (fa) (1969–2008) – actor
- Mehri Mehrnia (1917–2009) – actress
- Parvin Soleimāni (1922–2009) – actress
- Farrokh-Laghā Houshmand (1929–2009) – actress
- Abbās Shabāviz (fa) (1929–2009) – actor
- Jamshid Lāyegh (fa) (1931–2009) – actor
- Ali Miri (fa) (1936–2009) – actor
- Amir Ghavidel (1947–2009) – film director
- Seifollāh Dād (1955–2009) – film director
- Masoud Rassām (fa) (1957–2009) – film director
- Peymān Abadi (1972–2009) – stuntman
- Nikou Kheradmand (1932–2009) – actress
- Esmāil Riāhi (fa) (1920–2010) – film director
- Hamideh Kheirābādi (1924–2010) – actress
- Mahin Shahābi (fa) (1936–2010) – actress
- Mahmoud Bahrāmi (fa) (1937–2010) – actor
- Rezā Karam-Rezāei (fa) (1937–2010) – actor
- Nemat Haghighi (fa) (1939–2010) – film director
- Mohammad Varshowchi (fa) (1925–2011) – actor
- Mehri Vedādiān (1936–2011) – actress
- Mohsen Yousefbeig (fa) (1940–2011) – actor
- Esfandiār Ahmadieh (1929–2012) – film director
- Hamid Samandariān (1931–2012) – theater director
- Shāpour Gharib (1933–2012) – film director
- Abdollāh Boutimār (fa) (1933–2012) – actor
- Touti Salimi (fa) (1954–2012) – actress
- Taghi Rouhāni (1920–2013) – news anchor
- Saadi Afshār (fa) (1934–2013) – actor
- Jahāngir Jahāngiri (fa) (1946–2013) – film director
- Asal Badiei (1977–2013) – actress
- Mortezā Ahmadi (1924–2014) – actor
- Hassan Raziāni (fa) (1931–2014) – actor
- Māziār Partow (1933–2014) – film director
- Nāser Gitijāh (fa) (1935–2014) – actor
- Anoushirvān Arjmand (1941–2014) – actor
- Bāgher Sahrāroudi (fa) (1942–2014) – actor
- Akhtar Karimi Zand (fa) (1928–2015) – actress
- Valiollāh Momeni (1943–2015) – actor
- Homā Roustā (1944–2015) – actress
- Iraj Karimi (fr) (1953–2015) – film director
- Mostafā Abdollāhi (1955–2015) – actor
- Ali Tabātabāei (1983–2015) – actor
- Parviz Shāhinkhoo (fa) (1915–2016) – actor
- Dāvoud Rashidi (1933–2016) – actor
- Jafar Vāli (fa) (1934–2016) – actor
- Mohammad Zarrindast (1934–2016) – film director
- Forouzān (1937–2016) – actress
- Sorayyā Beheshti (fa) (1951–2016) – actress
- Donyā Fanizādeh (1967–2016) – puppeteer
- Ali Rāmez (fa) (1927–2017) – actor
- Mohammad Poursattār (1939–2017) – actor
- Kāzem Afrandniā (1945–2017) – actor
- Hassan Joharchi (1968–2017) – actor
- Nāser Malek-Motiei (1930–2018) – actor
- Iraj Safdari (1939–2018) – make-up artist
- Ezzatolāh Entezāmi (1924–2018) – actor
- Hossein Erfāni (1942–2018) – voice actor
- Hossein Shahāb (fa) (1947–2018) – actor
- Yadollāh Samadi (1951–2018) – film director
- Karim Zargar (fa) (1953–2018) – actor
- Saeid Kangarāni (1954–2018) – actor
- Dāriush Asadzādeh (fa) (1923–2019) – actor
- Nosrat Karimi (1924–2019) – actor
- Shahlā Riāhi (1927–2019) – actress
- Rezā Abdi (fa) (1931–2019) – actor
- Parviz Bahrām (1933–2019) – voice actor
- Jamshid Mashāyekhi (1934–2019) – actor
- Ebrāhim Ābādi (1934–2019) – actor
- Rezā Safāei (fa) (1936–2019) – film director
- Zobeideh Jahāngiri (fa) (1942–2019) – actress
- Farrokh Sājedi (fa) (1942–2019) – actor
- Habib Kāvosh (fa) (1944–2019) – film director
- Hamid Soheili (fa) (1949–2019) – film director
- Hossein Moheb-Ahari (fa) (1951–2019) – actor
- Khashāyār Alvand (fa) (1967–2019) – screenwriter
- Ali-Asghar Shahbāzi (1922–2020) – actor
- Nosratollāh Vahdat (1925–2020) – actor
- Mohammad-Ali Keshāvarz (1930–2020) – actor
- Valiollāh Shirandāmi (fa) (1931–2020) – actor
- Sedigheh Kiānfar (fa) (1932–2020) – actress
- Changiz Jalilvand (1935–2020) – voice actor
- Malakeh Ranjbar (fa) (1936–2020) – actress
- Ahmad Pourmokhber (fa) (1940–2020) – actor
- Khosrow Sināei (1941–2020) – film director
- Parviz Poorhosseini (1941–2020) – actor
- Bahman Mofid (1942–2020) – actor
- Cyrus Gorjestāni (fa) (1945–2020) – actor
- Nouri Kasrāei (fa) (1951–2020) – actress
- Karim Akbari Mobārakeh (1953–2020) – actor
- Siāmak Shāyeghi (1954–2020) – film director
- Kāmboziā Partovi (1955–2020) – film director
- Ali Abolhassani (fa) (1972–2020) – actor
- Siāmak Atlasi (1936–2021) – actor
- Hamid Mojtahedi (1942–2021) – film producer
- Fathali Oveisi (1946–2021) – actor
- Fereshteh Tāerpour (1953–2021) – film producer
- Bābak Khorramdin (1974–2021) – film director
- Arshā Aghdasi (fa) (1982–2021) – stuntman
- Āzādeh Nāmdāri (1984–2021) – actress
- Jalāl Maghāmi (1941–2022) – voice actor
- Amin Tārokh (1954–2022) – actor
- Turan Mehrzād (fa) (1930–2023) – actress
- Dāriush Mehrjui (1939–2023) – film director
- Nāsser Tahmāsb (1939–2023) – voice actor
- Kiumars Pourahmad (1949–2023) – film director
- Farimāh Farjāmi (1952–2023) – actress
- Ātilā Pesyāni (1957–2023) – actor
- Bitā Farrahi (1958–2023) – actress
- Vahideh Mohammadifar (ru) (1969–2023) – screenwriter
- Zhāleh Olov (1927–2024) – actress
- Pari Sāberi (1932–2024) – theater director
- Saeed Rād (1944–2024) – actor
- Zari Khoshkām (1947–2024) – actress
- Sadreddin Hejāzi (1948–2024) – actor
- Rezā Dāvoodnejād (1980–2024) – actor
- Mohammad-Ali Tabriziān (1937–2025) – actor
- Saeed Mozaffari (1942–2025) – voice actor
- Jamāl Ejlāli (1947–2025) – actor
- Shirin Yazdānbakhsh (1949–2025) – actress
- Shahrzād (1950–2025) – actress
- Mohammad Kāsebi (1951–2025) – actor
- Saeid Pirdoost (1941–2026) – actor
- Nezāmeddin Kiāie (1944–2026) – sound engineer
- Enāyatollāh Bakhshi (1945–2026) – actor
- Rezā Rooygari (1946–2026) – actor
- Akbar Abdi (1960–2026) – actor

=== Athletes ===
- Shervin Jazāyeri (fa) (1954–1972) – mountain climber
- Karam Nirlou (1943–1976) – football player
- Mehdi Masoud-Ansāri (d. 1978) – football player
- Ali Dānāeifard (1921–1979) – football player
- Mansour Raeisi (1928–1980) – wrestler
- Hossein Sadaghiāni (1903–1982) – football player and coach
- Esmāil Elmkhāh (1936–1988) – weightlifter
- Mahmoud Nāmjoo (1918–1990) – weightlifter
- Hossein Soroudi (d. 1991) – football player
- Parviz Dehdāri (1935–1992) – football player and coach
- Mehrāb Shāhrokhi (1944–1993) – football player
- Akbar Khojini (1935–1995) – boxer
- Ahmad Izadpanāh (fa) (1910–1997) – athlete
- Hossein Jabbārzādegān (d. 1997) – basketball player
- Ezatollāh Jānmaleki (1947–1999) – football player
- Jafar Salmāsi (1918–2000) – weightlifter and first Iranian Olympic medallist
- Abbās Ekrāmi (1915–2002) – football manager
- Mohammad Pazirāei (1929–2002) – wrestler
- Nabi Sorouri (1933–2002) – wrestler
- Hossein Fekri (1924–2003) – football player
- Yousef Safvat (1931–2003) – chess player
- Khosrow Kahyāi (fa) (1940–2003) – chess player
- Mohammad Ranjbar (1935–2004) – football player
- Shamseddin Seyed-Abbāsi (1943–2004) – wrestler
- Fereydoun Sādeghi (d. 2005) – basketball player
- Nāser Kārfarsā (fa) (1923–2005) – football player
- Firouz Alizādeh (1946–2005) – wrestler
- Majid Sabzi (fa) (1959–2006) – football player
- Hossein-Ali Mobasher (fa) (1922–2007) – football player
- Ali Ghaffāri (1925–2007) – wrestler
- Sādegh Aliakbarzādeh (1932–2007) – boxer
- Hamid Shirzādegān (1941–2007) – football player
- Tourān Shādpour (fa) (1951–2007) – athlete
- Āidin Nikkhāh Bahrāmi (1982–2007) – basketball player
- Aboutāleb Tālebi (1945–2008) – wrestler
- Fariborz Morādi (1964–2008) – football player
- Abbās Gharib (1916–2009) – football player
- Amir-Hossein Mobāsher (fa) (1922–2009) – football player
- Nāser Āghāei (1944–2009) – boxer
- Māshāllāh Amin-Sorour (1931–2010) – cyclist
- Mostafā Tājik (1932–2010) – wrestler
- Mansour Amirāsefi (1933–2010) – football player
- Kāmboziā Jamāli (1938–2010) – football player
- Masoud Boroumand (1928–2011) – football player
- Nāser Hejāzi (1949–2011) – football player
- Masoud Estili (1969–2011) – football player
- Leilā Esfandiāri (1970–2011) – mountain climber
- Abdollāh Mojtabavi (1925–2012) – wrestler
- Jalāl Mansouri (1930–2012) – wrestler
- Dāvoud Nasiri (fa) (1921–2013) – football player
- Hassan Sadiān (1925–2013) – wrestler
- Javād Derafshi-Javān (fa) (1927–2013) – tennis player
- Boyuk Jeddikār (1929–2013) – football player
- Nosratollāh Momtahen (1930–2013) – sports shooter
- Akbar Poudeh (1933–2012) – cyclist
- Hassan Pākandām (1934–2013) – boxer
- Nāzem Ganjāpour (1943–2013) – football player
- Mohammad-Hassan Zolfaghāri (d. 2013) – basketball player
- Kāzem Sārikhāni (1978–2013) – judoka
- Mahmoud Beiglou (1929–2014) – alpine skier
- Gholāmhossein Mazloumi (1950–2014) – football player
- Hossein Maadani (1971–2014) – volleyball player
- Rasoul Raeisi (1924–2015) – weightlifter
- Āref Gholizādeh (1938–2015) – football player
- Kāmbiz Derafshi-Javān (fa) (1954–2015) – tennis player
- Homāyoun Behzādi (1942–2016) – football player
- Mansour Pourheidari (1946–2016) – football player
- Rezā Ahadi (1962–2016) – football player
- Bahman Golbārnejād (1968–2016) – cyclist
- Hossein Soudipour (1922–2017) – basketball player
- Abbās Zandi (1930–2017) – wrestler
- Nāser Givehchi (1932–2017) – wrestler
- Manouchehr Boroumand (1934–2017) – weightlifter
- Bijan Zarnegār (1940–2017) – fencer
- Ebrāhim Āshtiāni (1941–2017) – football player
- Akbar Eftekhāri (1943–2017) – football player
- Mohammad-Ali Falāhatinejād (1976–2017) – weightlifter
- Ghorbān-Ali Tāri (fa) (1927–2018) – football player
- Ali-Rezā Ghelichkhāni (1937–2018) – wrestler
- Mahmoud Moezzipour (fa) (1937–2018) – wrestler
- Iraj Dānāeifard (1951–2018) – football player
- Majid Gholāmnejād (1983–2018) – football player
- Amir Āghā-Hosseini (fa) (1931–2019) – football player
- Nadjmeddin Fārābi (1933–2019) – athlete
- Abdollāh Khodābandeh (1936–2019) – wrestler
- Parviz Jalāyer (1939–2019) – weightlifter
- Jafar Kāshāni (1944–2019) – football player
- Khosrow Harandi (1950–2019) – chess player
- Keyvān Vahdāni (1991–2019) – football player
- Abolfazl Salabi (1924–2020) – basketball player
- Amir Yāvari (1931–2020) – boxer
- Mohammad Āmi-Tehrāni (1938–2020) – weightlifter
- Fariborz Esmāili (1940–2020) – football player
- Parviz Aboutāleb (1942–2020) – football player
- Mohammad-Rezā Navāei (1948–2020) – wrestler
- Sabā Shāyesteh (fa) (1990–2020) – rower
- Hamid Jāsemiān (1936–2021) – football player
- Mehdi Attār-Ashrafi (1948–2021) – weightlifter
- Abbās Ansārifard (1956–2021) – football administrator
- Kāzem Mohammadi (1973–2021) – futsal player
- Mehrdād Mināvand (1975–2021) – football player
- Ali Ansāriān (1977–2021) – football player
- Shāhpour Zarnegār (1929–2022) – fencer
- Hossein Ghafourizādeh (1943–2022) – athlete
- Ahmad Akbari (1947–2022) – fencer
- Minā Fathi (1946–2023) (fa) – volleyball player
- Hāshem Kolāhi (1956–2024) – wrestler
- Farāmarz Zelli (1942–2025) – football player
- Dāriush Mostafavi (1944–2025) – football player
- Akbar Kārgarjam (1944–2025) – football player
- Gholāmhossein Farzāmi (1945–2025) – football player
- Rezā Soukhtehsarāei (1950–2025) – wrestler
- Mehdi Hāj-Mohammad (1950–2025) – football player
- Enāyatollāh Ātashi (1945–2026) – basketball player

=== Businessmen and philanthropists ===
- Mohammad-Ali Mofarrah (fa) (1915–1983) – businessman and founder of Bank Saderat Iran
- Gholāmali Abidi (fa) (1920–2004) – scholar and businessman
- Mohammad-Taghi Barkhordār (1924–2012) – businessman
- Ahmad Atāei (fa) (1919–2013) – philanthropist
- Fereydoun Novin Farahbakhsh (fa) (1930–2013) – businessman and collector
- Mahāfarid Amir-Khosravi (1969–2014) – businessman
- Abdorrahim Jafari (1919–2015) – publisher
- Rezā Niāzmand (fa) (1921–2017) – philanthropist
- Asghar Ghandchi (1928–2019) – philanthropist

=== Others ===
- Ihsan Nuri Pasha (1892–1976) – Kurdish politician
- Sakineh Ghāsemi (d. 1979) – sex worker
- Majid Sālek Mohammadi (d. 1985) – serial killer
- Effat Tejāratchi (1917–1999) – pioneer aviator
- Bozorg "Moody" Mahmoody (1939–2009) – anaesthesiologist
- Shahlā Jāhed (1969–2010) – convict
- Reyhāneh Jabbāri (1988–2014) – convict

In addition to the tombs of royalty, politicians, and other significant people, in the cemetery there are symbolic tombs for the perpetrators of the 1983 Hezbollah attacks on the U.S. Marine and French peacekeepers' barracks in Beirut and for the assassin of Anwar Sadat, Khalid Islambuli. Similarly, a symbolic tomb was erected in the cemetery for Hezbollah member Imad Mughniyah, who was killed on 12 February 2008 in Damascus, Syria.

== Images ==
Tomb of Ruhollah Khomeini

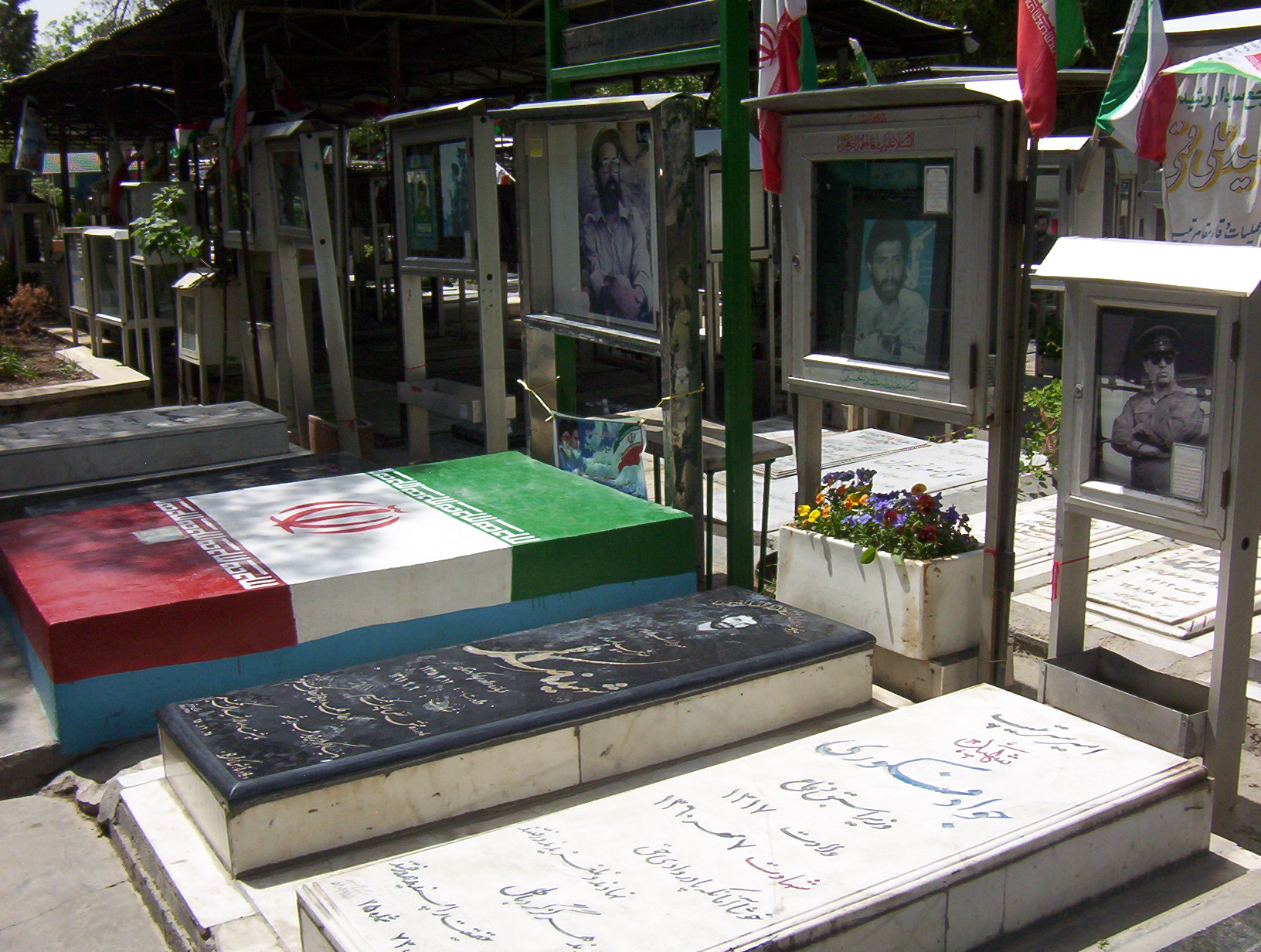
Tombs of Mostafa Chamran and Javad Fakoori

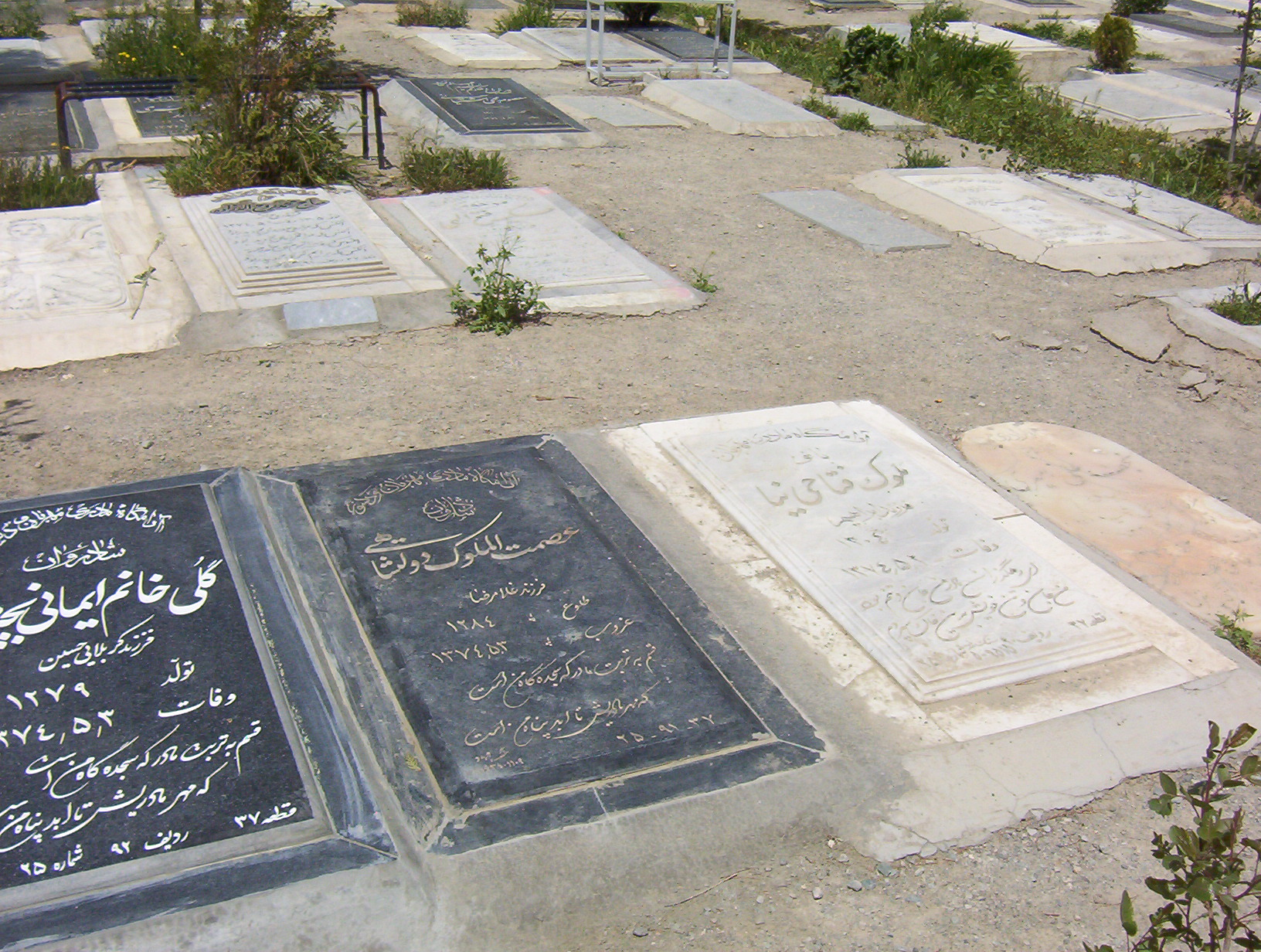
Tomb of Esmat Dowlatshahi

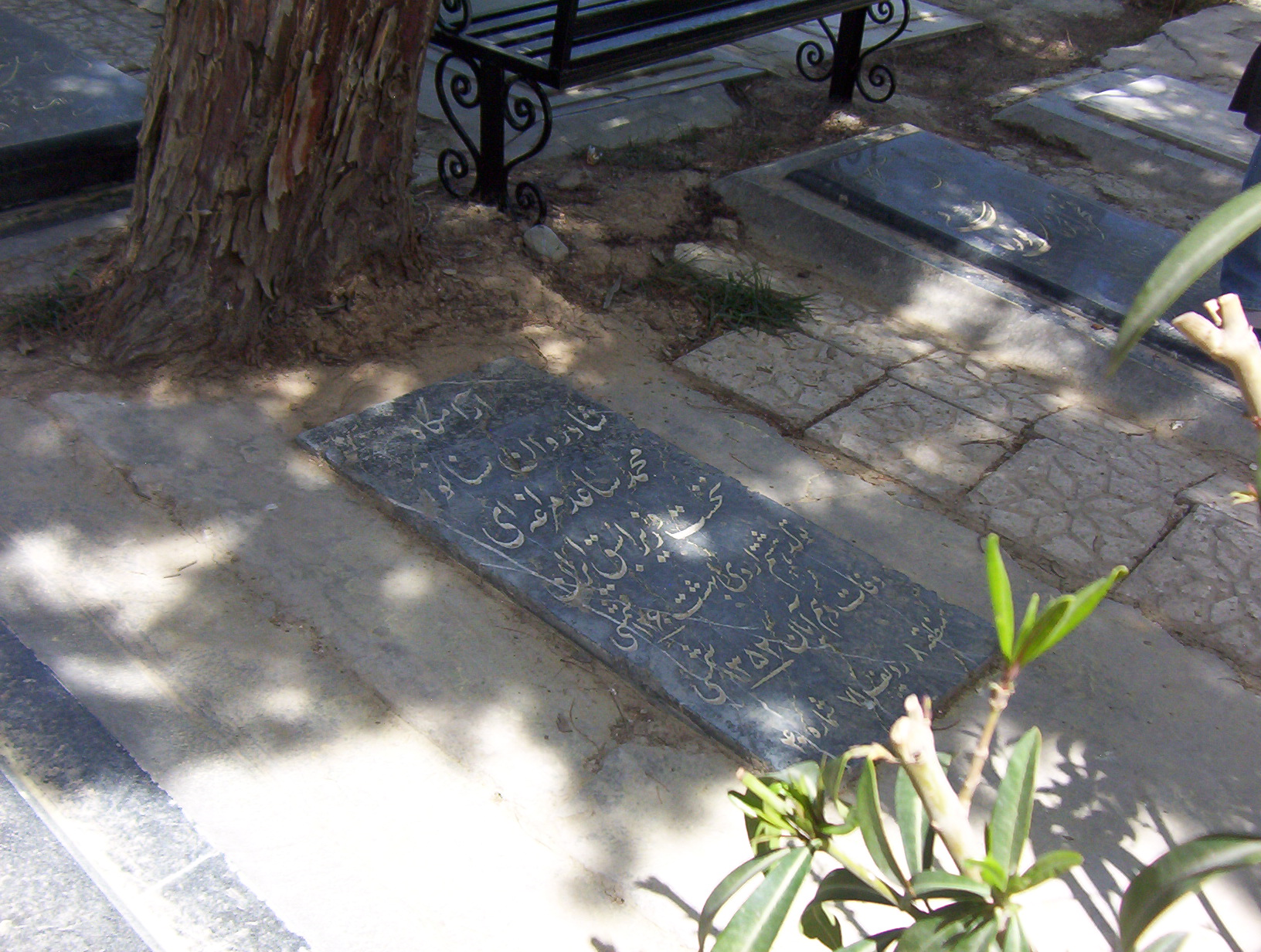
Tomb of Mohammad Sa'ed

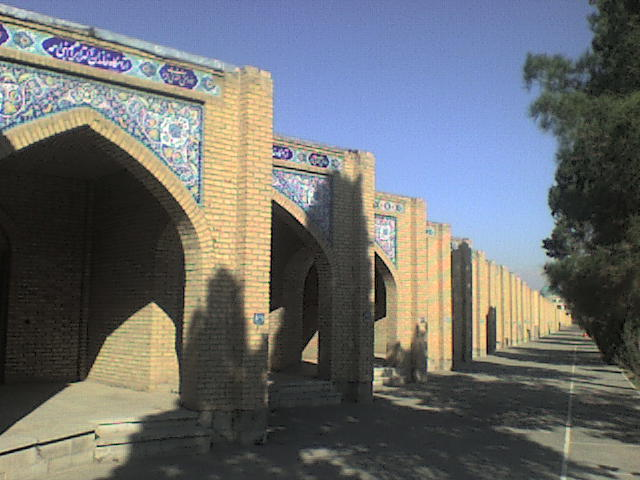
Private tombs

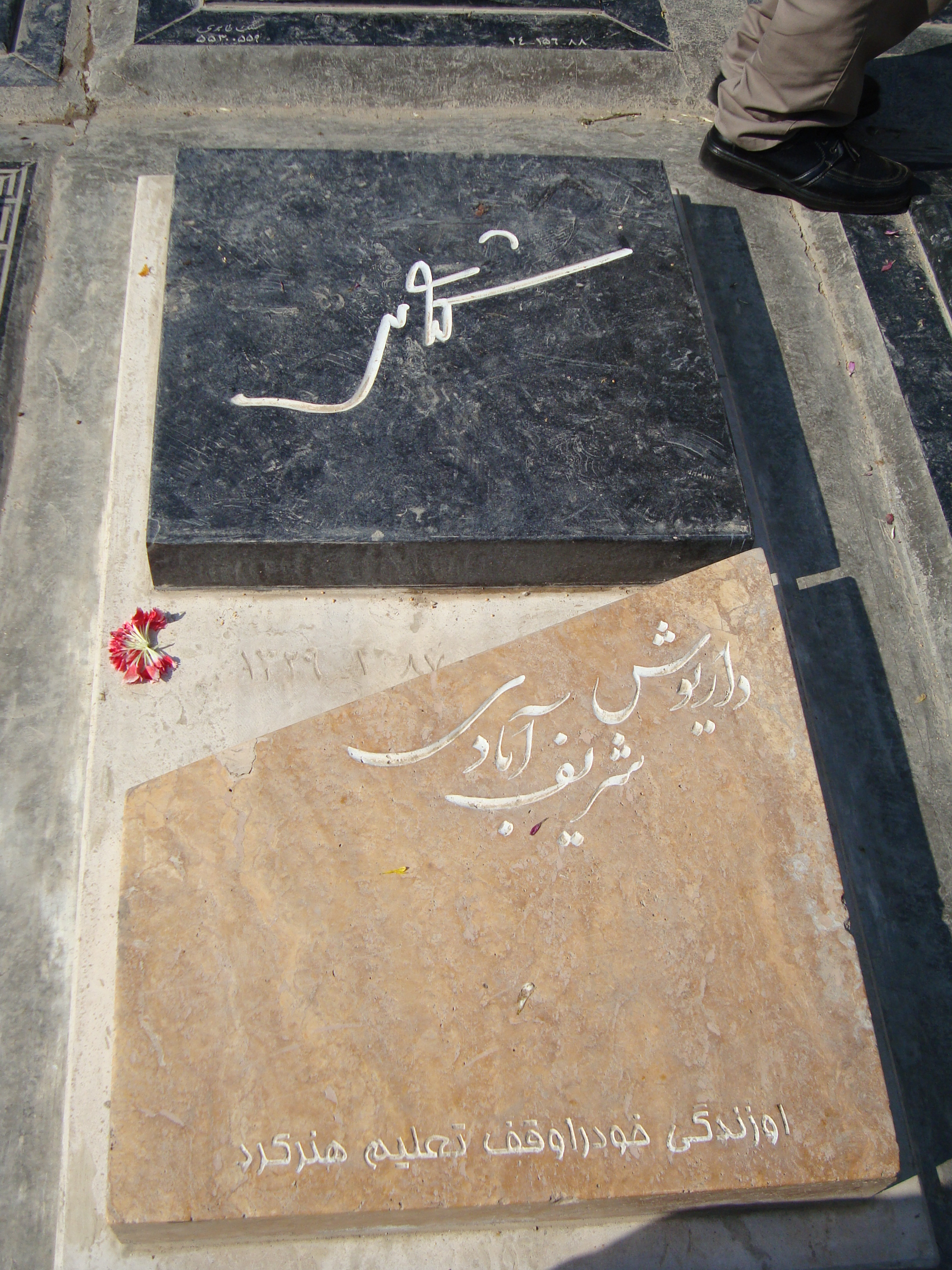

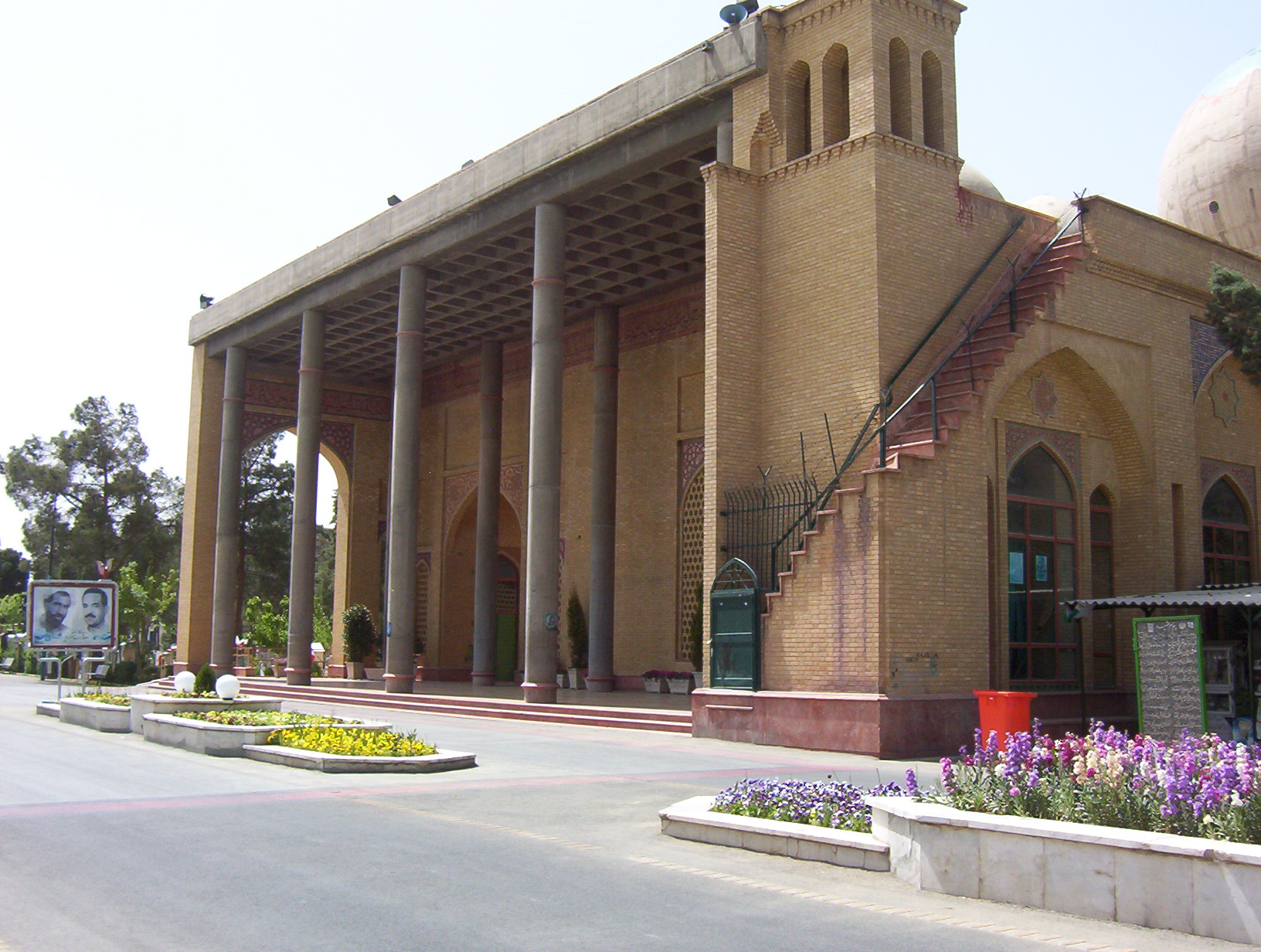
Haft-e Tir bombing victims' memorial outside view
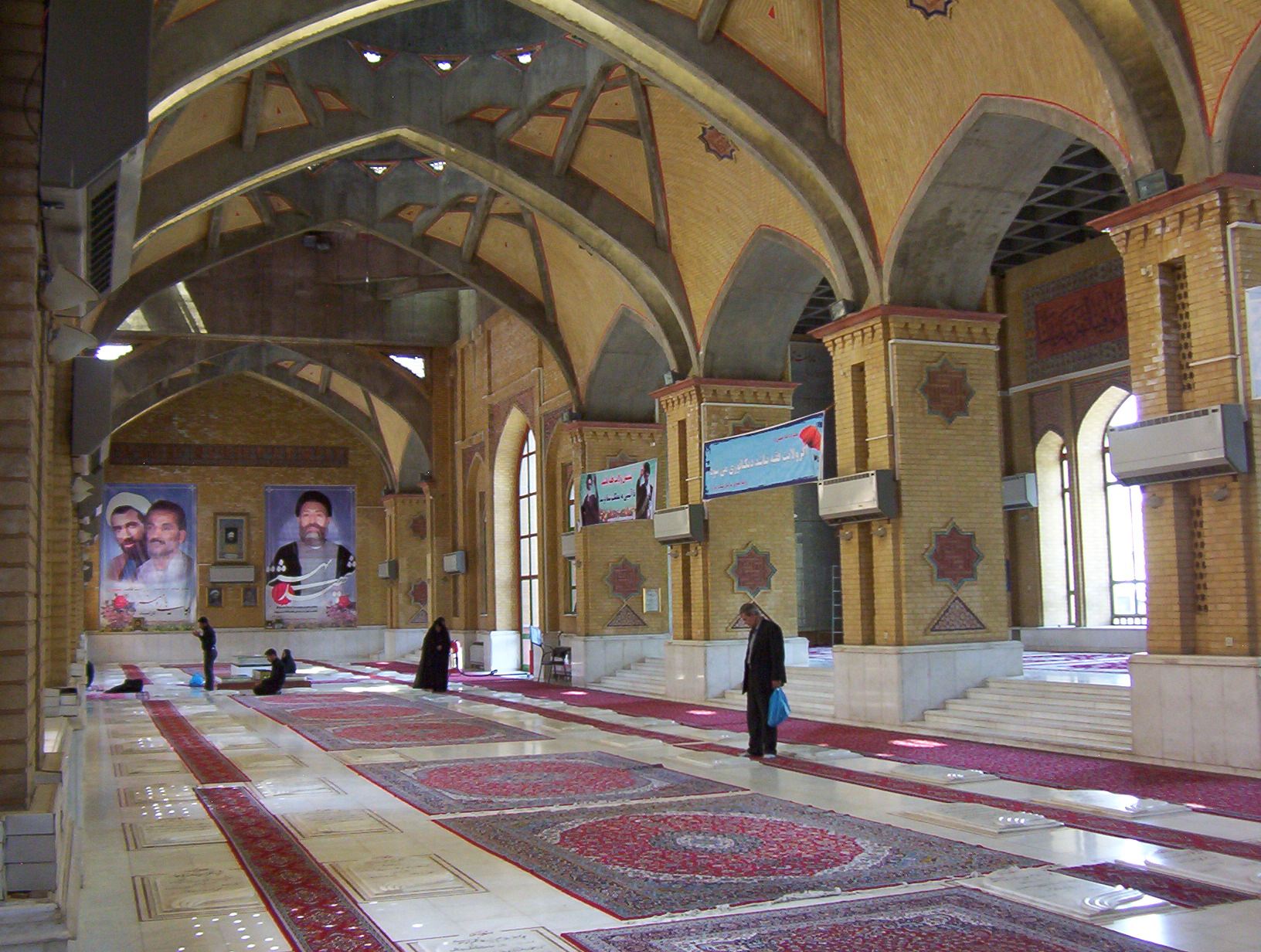
Haft-e Tir bombing victims' memorial

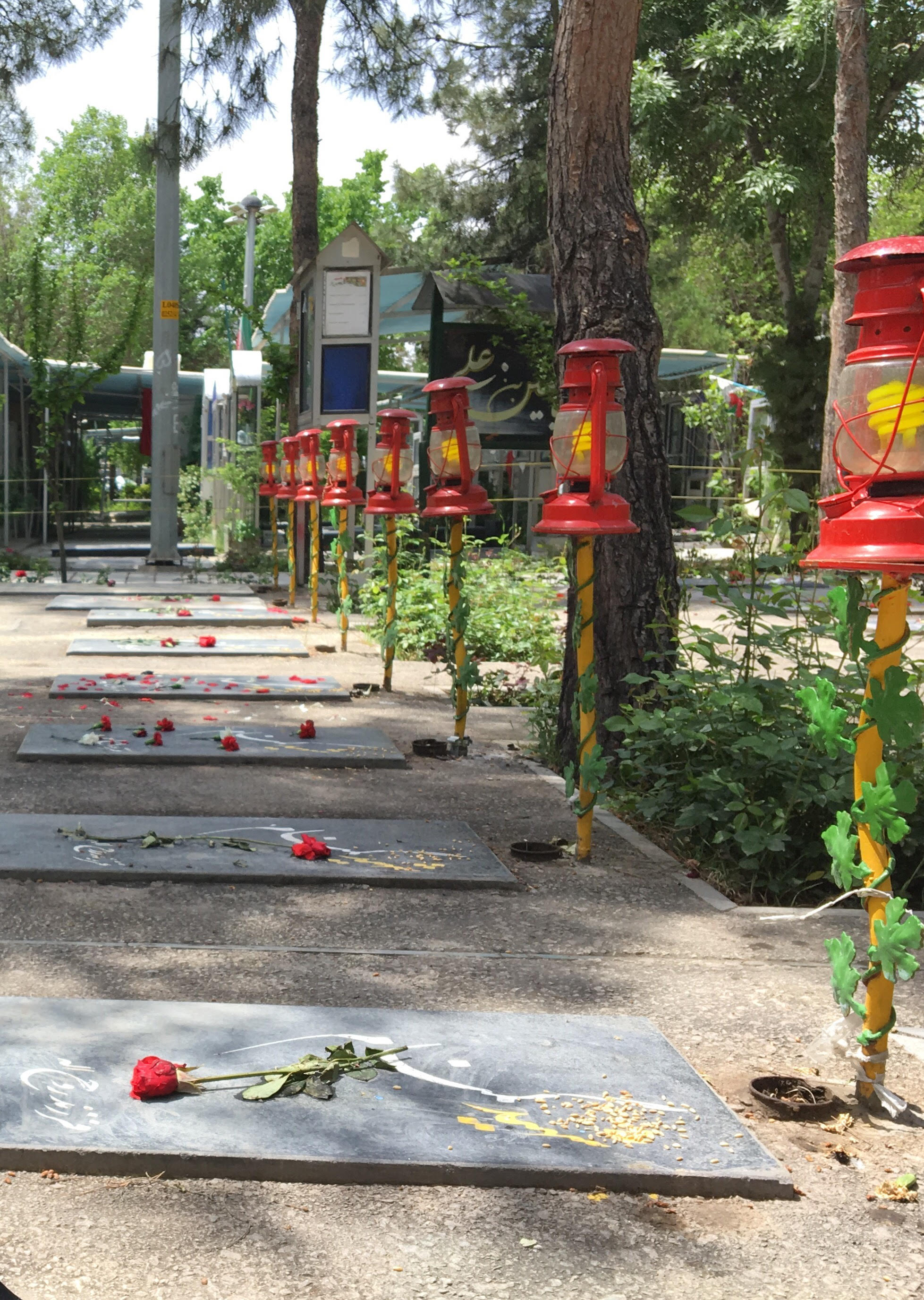
The graves of unknown martyrs

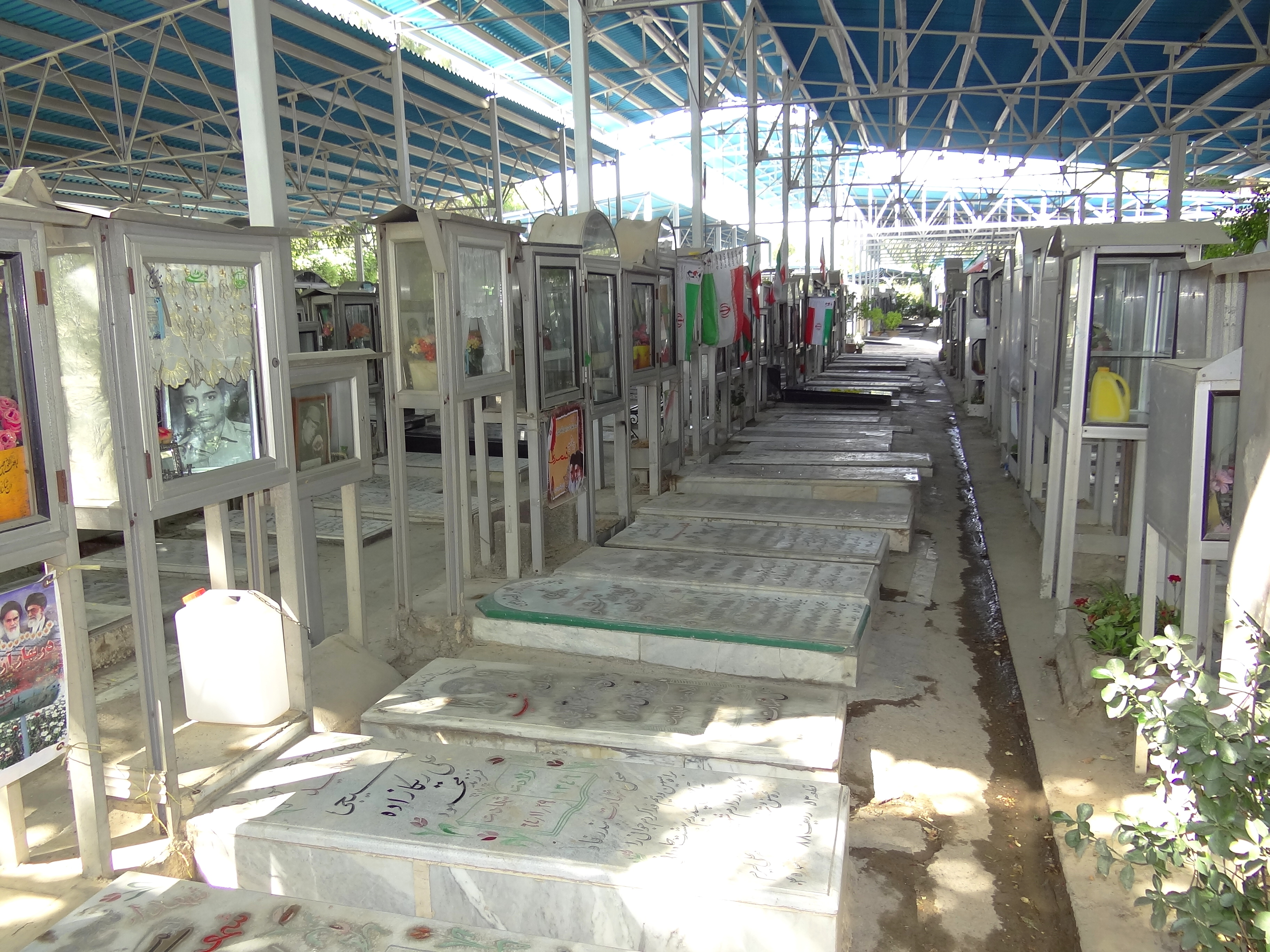
Iran–Iraq War victims' tombs

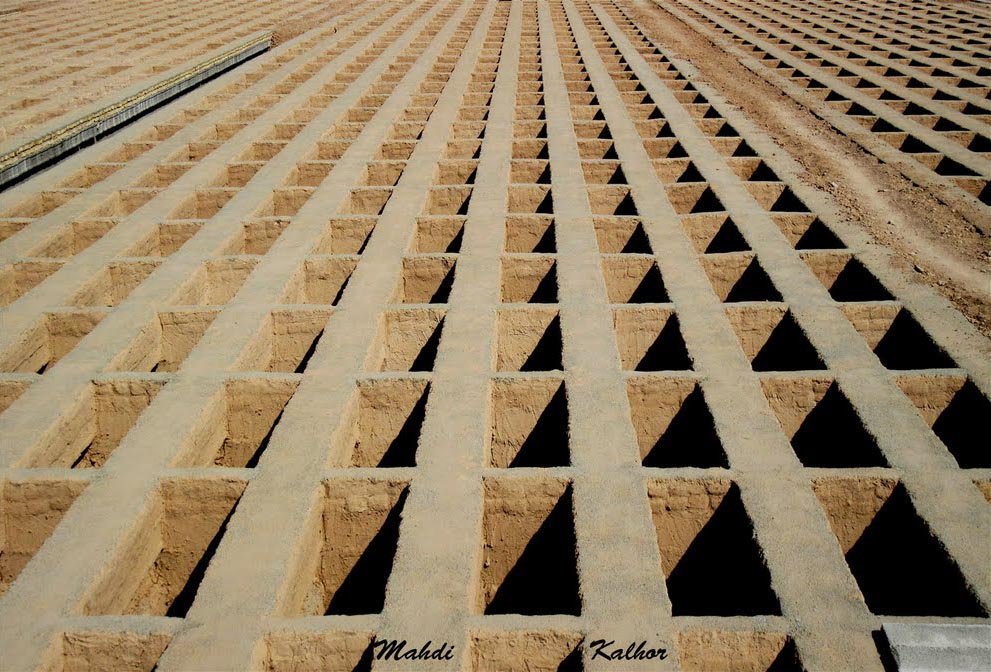
Prepared graves

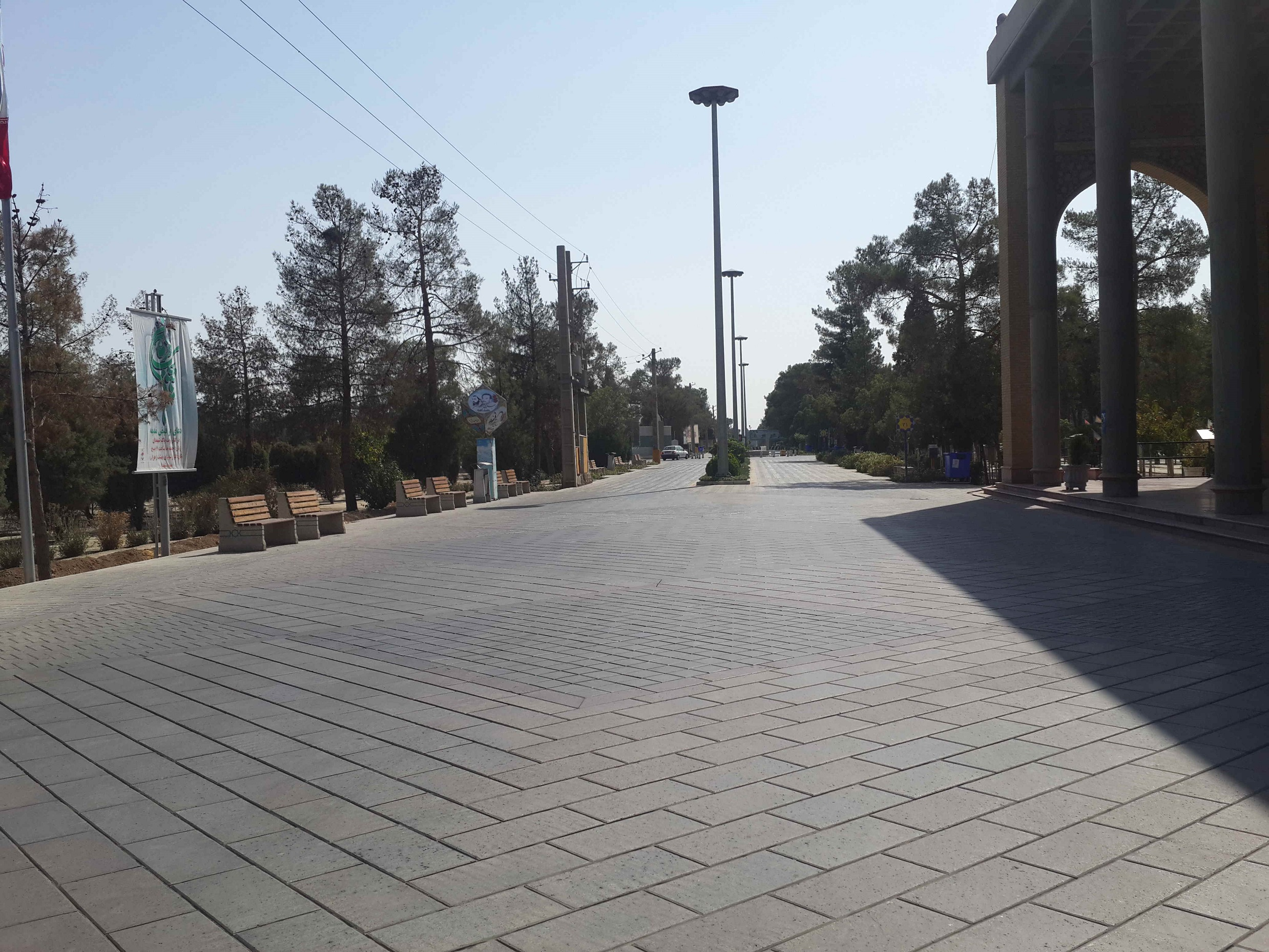
Shohada street

== See also ==
- Mausoleum of Ruhollah Khomeini
- Khavaran cemetery
- Zahir-od-dowleh cemetery
- Golestan Shohada of Isfahan
- Golzar Shohada of Qom
