= Davood Parsa-Pajouh =

Iranian academic (1941–2015)

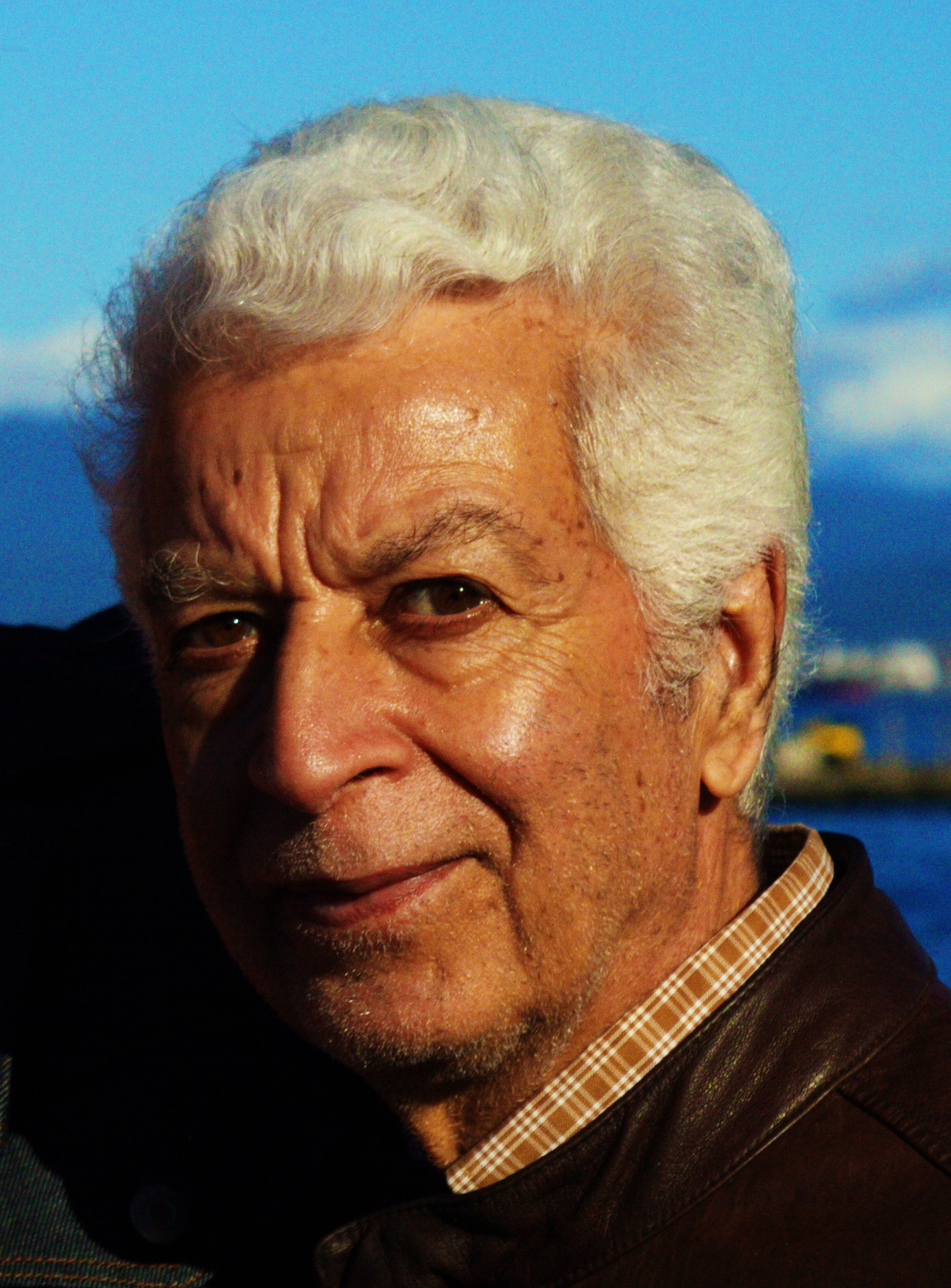
Davood Parsa-Pajouh

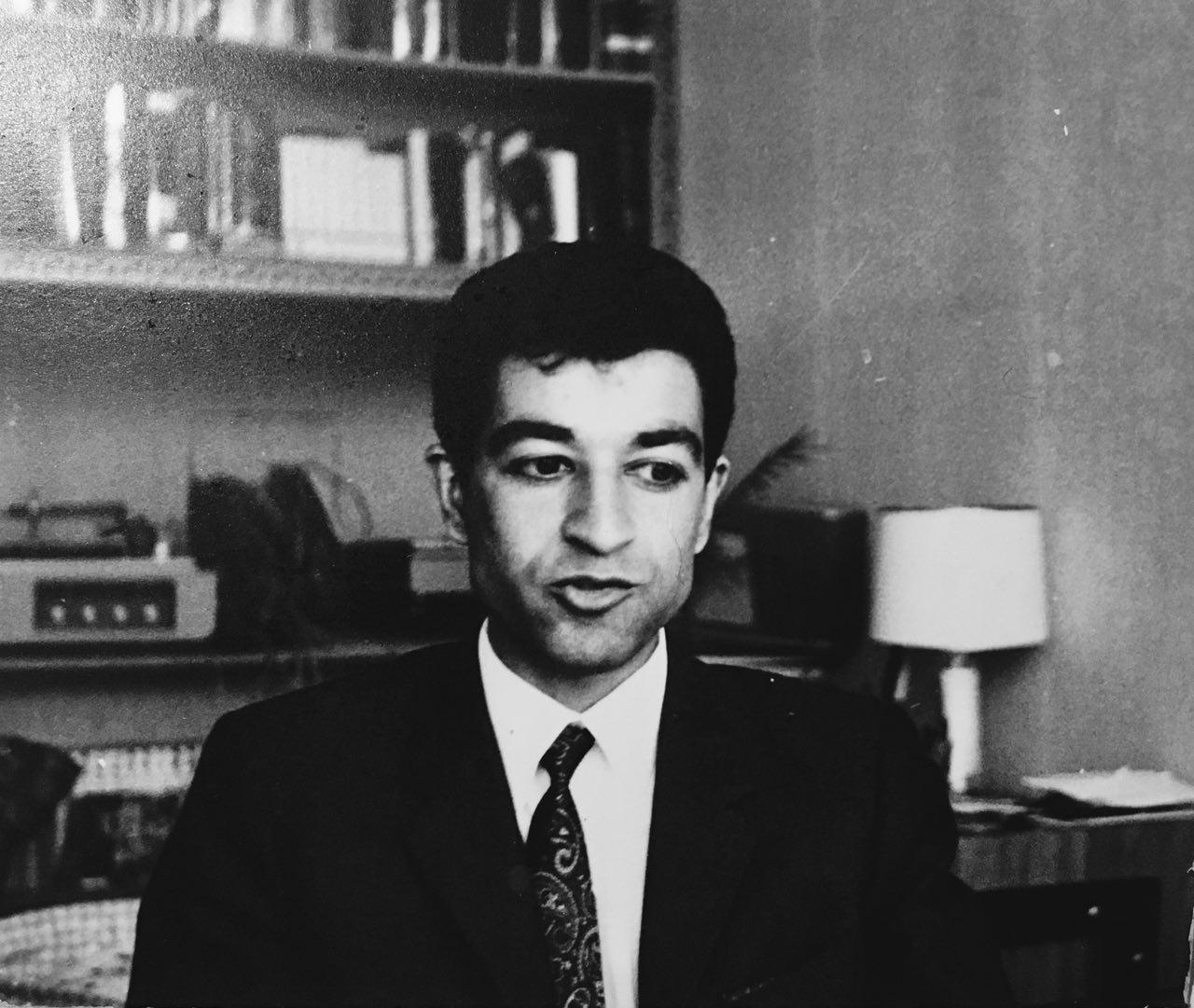
Early student life

Davood Parsa-Pajouh (Persian: داوود پارساپژوه ) was a prominent scholar at the University of Tehran. He was professor of the Department of Wood Science and Technology at the Faculty of Natural Resources, and is the author and translator of several books and articles.

== Biography ==
Parsa-Pajouh was born in Tehran at 1941. After graduation from Hadaf High School, he entered the Faculty of Agriculture at the University of Tehran. He received his bachelor's degree in Forest and Range Engineering at 1965. Thereafter, he was awarded a National Scholarship to continue his post-graduate study at the French National School of Forestry in Nancy, France. He returned to Iran in 1970 after receiving his PhD degree in Wood Technology & Engineering, and started to work as a lecturer in the Faculty of Natural Resources. Parsa-Pajouh participated in several research programs in France and Switzerland during his professional career.

He was active in leadership at the University of Tehran, eventually serving as Head of the Department of Wood Science and Technology, Dean of the Faculty of Natural Resources, and Vice-Chancellor of the University of Tehran. He was also a member of the Academy of Sciences and head of the Wood Science Group, and an Editor of the Iranian Journal of Natural Resources. He was recognized as Distinguished Researcher and Distinguished Professor of the University of Tehran, and as a Nationwide Distinguished Professor.

Davood Parsa-Pajouh died on 11 August 2015 at the age of 74, at Laleh Hospital in Tehran. He was buried in the Nam-Avaran plot in Behesht-e Zahra, which is reserved for national scholars and scientists.

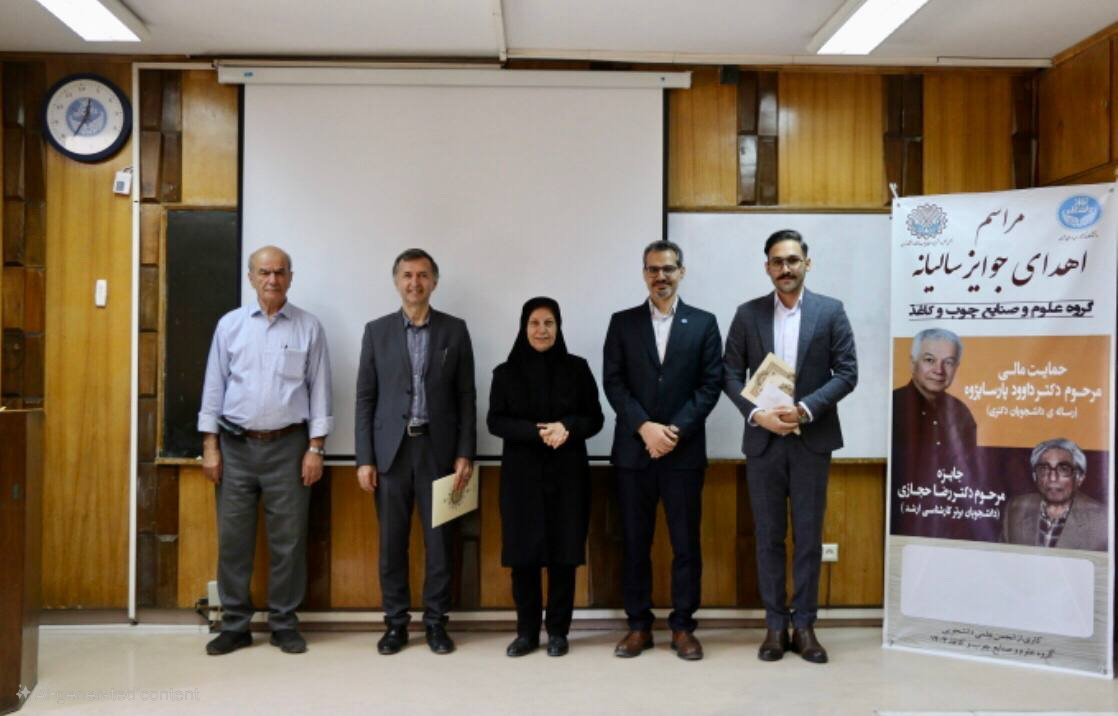
Winners of the Prof. Parsa-Pajouh Award in 2025

== Davoud Parsa-Pajouh Annual Award ==
The Davoud Parsa-Pajouh Annual Award selects PhD students for creations and innovations in wood and paper science. As of 2025, the memorial award consists of 2 prizes totalling 50 million Tomans, chosen by the board of the Wood Science department of Natural Resource Faculty of the University of Tehran.

== Bibliography ==
- Wood Technology, University of Tehran Press. In 2015, Wood Technology was honoured as one of the 80 treasures of the University of Tehran
- Industrial Timber Preservation, University of Tehran Press
- Atlas of the Woods of the North of Iran, University of Tehran Press
- Tree Multi-lingual encyclopedia, University of Tehran Press
- Paper and composites from agro-based resources, University of Tehran Press
- House Termites, Shahid Rajaee Teacher Training University Press

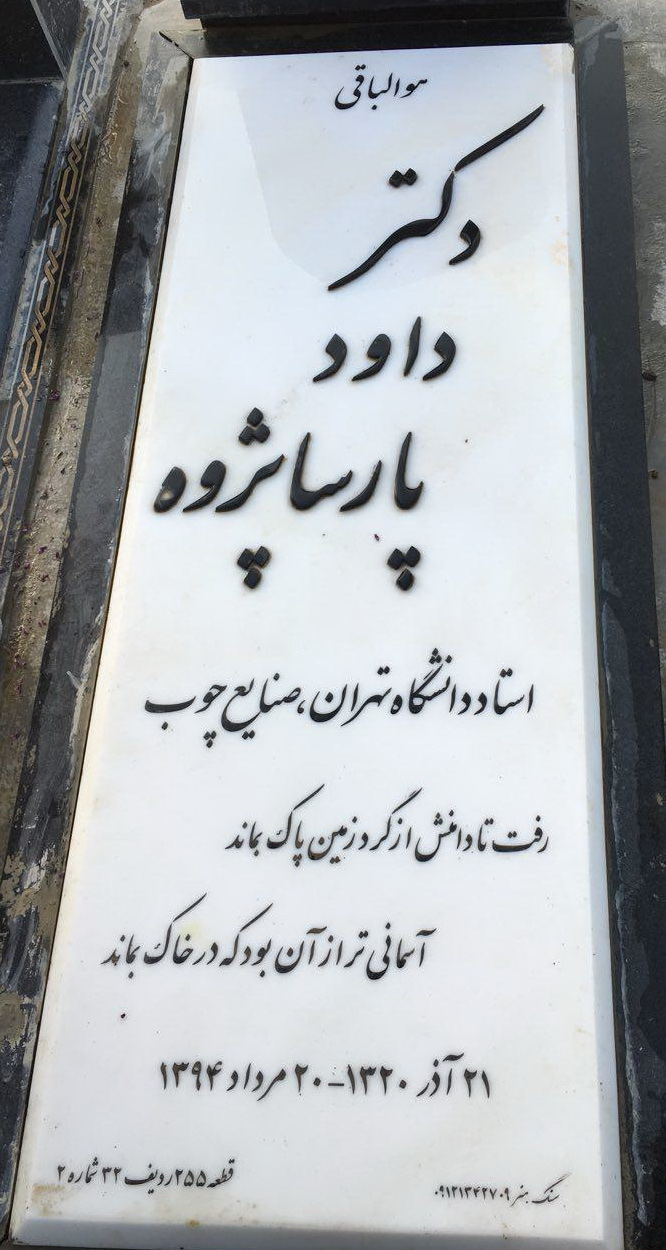
Nam Avaran
