= Shokouh Mirfattah =

Iranian activist

Shokouh Mirfattah (Fatemeh HajMirfattah) was born on 25 September 1946 in Tehran, Iran. After receiving a bachelor's degree in physical education, she moved to the United States to complete her advanced studies in this field. In 1978, while working on her Ph.D. dissertation at University of Texas in Houston, she got involved in a car accident and became paraplegic.

After moving to Iran and spending several years in rehabilitation, Mirfattah with a doctorate degree in physical education, decided to share her knowledge with those with disabilities to improve their lives in a society that did offer little support for the disabled. She held faculty positions at several universities in Iran. Her lectures were regularly attended by many nationally and internationally recognized athletes. She founded and co-founded several different organizations and support groups with the goal of improving the conditions of the disabled including the Paralympic Committee of Iran, and Iranian Spinal Cord Injury Association. She authored, co-authored, and translated several publications that introduced the issues of equal rights and equal opportunities for people with disabilities to the Iranian community.

After several years of battling a series of serious health problems including kidney failures and going through dialysis, Mirfattah died in the early hours of June 12, 2010 in San Francisco, California. She was buried on June 22, 2010 in the "naamavaran" section of Behesht-e Zahra cemetery of Tehran, Iran.

Mirfattah was the founder of the Iranian Society of Spinal Cord Injury. Her contributions to the field of sports medicine and particularly, the issues related to people and athletes with disabilities has had a significant impact on lives of many with disabilities.

== Works ==
1. Are You Really Disabled?
2. Grading Disability in Sport and Medicine
3. International Basketball Rules for the Disabled
4. Special Sports for the Disabled
5. Sexual Disorders Caused by Neural Problems
6. Physiotherapy in Sport
7. Essentials of Physical Fitness

Mirfattah also authored several articles in scientific journals and attended many international conferences on the topics of sports medicine for athletes with disabilities. She served on the executive committee of the International Stoke Mandeville Wheelchair Sports Federation (ISMWSF) and International Paralympic Committee for several years.
