= Mehran Ghassemi =

Iranian journalist

- Born: April 8, 1977; Shiraz, Iran
- Died: January 9, 2008 (aged 30); Tehran, Iran
- Occupations: Translator and journalist.

Mehran Ghassemi (Persian: مهران قاسمی) (April 8, 1977 – January 9, 2008) was an Iranian journalist. He was an expert on Iranian Nuclear Dossier and Foreign Policy and published hundreds of articles in Iranian newspapers.

== Early years ==
Ghassemi was working as the Editor of International Affairs Desk of Etemad-e Melli, a pro-reform daily named after a party established by the former reformist speaker of parliament, Mehdi Karrubi.

He was a critic of the conservative policies of the government led by Mahmoud Ahmadinejad.

During the 2005 Iranian presidential election, Ghassemi was the editor-in-chief of Aftab News, a news website which promoted Akbar Hashemi Rafsanjani and criticized his rivals.

== Death ==
He died January 9, 2008, at home in Tehran, at age 30, from heart failure and was laid to rest in Tehran cemetery (Behesht-e Zahra) in the “journalists” section (Ghet'ey-e Ashaab-e-Rasaaneh).

== Books ==
- Kimiâ Xâtoun, Sâles publication
- Felestin, na solh, na sâzesh
