= Ali Akbar Tajvidi =

Akbar Tajvidi (Persian: ‌اکبر تجویدی, 1927 – June 10, 2017) was an Iranian painter, researcher, archaeologist, and a Persian miniature painter.

== Education ==
Akbar Tajvidi was born on Oct 14 1926. He was the son of Hadi Khan Tajvidi, who was a painter and a student of Kamal-ol-molk. His brothers Mohammad and Ali Tajvidi were Iranian painters and musicians. Akbar was also a student of Kamal-ol-molk who attended the Sanaye Mostazrafeh Art School, better known as Kamal-ol-molk Art School. He became one of the most famous artist and researcher of the Tajvidi family. Akbar had a brilliant career in art education and cooperated frequently with the Ministry of Culture and Arts.

He was a serious initiator of doing qualitative research in the history of the Persian miniature.

== Career ==
Akbar Tajvidi spent many years researching. He wrote various articles, and did many works on the art and culture of Iran. Among his artworks is the book "A Look at the Art of Iranian Painting from the Beginning to the Tenth Century". The book represents a historical trajectory that began with the painting of Lorestan caves and according to research, it shows the results of various historical periods in them along with visual examples. Eventually, the study reaches the Safavid dynasty.

This book is the first dedicated book about the Iranian miniature and was published in 1974. In 1969, Akbar contributed to the publication of an alternative book, "The Fifth World Congress of Archeology and Art of Iran". This was another artwork that has been left behind by Tajvidi.

== Death ==
Akbar died on Saturday, June 10, 2017, at the age of 91 in Paris. His body was transferred to Iran on June 14 to be buried in Tehran according to his will. On Thursday morning, June 15, 2017 after his funeral, he was buried in the artists’ block at Behesht-e Zahra Cemetery.

== See also ==
- List of Iranian painters
