= Marzieh Arfa =

Iranian military officer and physician (1901-1978)

- Born: 1901; Istanbul, Turkey
- Died: May 13, 1978 (aged 76–77) Tehran, Pahlavi Iran
- Buried: Behesht-e Zahra
- Allegiance: Imperial Iranian Army
- Branch: army women's college
- Service years: 1932–1962
- Rank: brigadier general
- Known for: The first Iranian female brigadier general

Marzieh Arfa (Persian: مرضیه ارفع, 1901 – May 13, 1978) was the first woman in the Iranian army who reached the rank of brigadier general.

== Early life ==
Marzieh Arfa was the daughter of Abdul Razzaq Arfa, a carpet merchant, who was born in 1901 in Istanbul, Turkey. She completed her primary and secondary education in the same city. After entering the university in 1929, she graduated in the field of medicine.

== Career ==
Arfa practiced pediatrics and gynecology for two years in Turkey. She returned to her hometown in Iran in 1929 and after being employed in the Ministry of Health, she took charge of the second ward of the former Pahlavi Hospital. In 1933, Reza Shah appointed her as the head of the army women's college with the rank of captain. Since most of the men in Arfa's family were army officers, her presence as the head of the army women's school made her gradually practice medicine as an official job in army hospitals. Also, Arfa has been teaching health and medicine in girls' conservatory for 19 years. For some time, she treated various patients in the Shahshahi Social Services Organization. Arfa's first marriage with Dr. Peshwa was short, and a few years after the death of his first wife, she married Dr. Bakhtiari.

== Military ==
Arfa was the first Iranian female brigadier general. In 1933 she entered the service of the Imperial Army of Iran with the rank of second lieutenant (officer rank) by order of Reza Shah. This event also marked the beginning of women's work in the Iranian Imperial Army. In 1959, as the first Iranian woman, she reached the rank of brigadier general, and in 1962, she retired after 30 years of service in the Imperial Army of Iran. She died in 1978 and was buried in Behesht-e Zahra.
