= Abdoulreza Soudbakhsh =

Iranian physician (1950–2010)

Abdolreza Soudbakhsh
- Born: 16 January 1950; Bandar Anzali
- Died: September 21, 2010 (aged 60); Tehran, Iran
- Occupations: University professor Medical doctor

Academic work
- Discipline: Medicine

Prof. Abdolreza Soudbakhsh (1950 – 21 September 2010) was an Iranian physician and university professor who examined prisoners during the 2009 Iranian election protests. He was assassinated in front of his medical office at 9pm on September 21, 2010. Jaras News Agency cited that Soudbakhsh had treated and examined prisoners of the Kahrizak detention center, and was under pressure to report all the genital and urinary infections (caused by repetitive rapes) as meningitis, and his resistance to keep his oath was the reason for his assassination.
