= Ghassem Hasheminezhad =

Iranian translator and writer

Ghassem Hashemi Nezhad
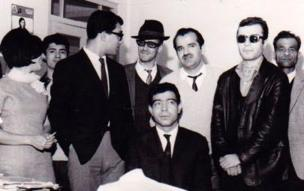
- Born: 1940; Amol, Iran
- Died: 2016; Tehran, Iran
- Resting place: Tehran
- Occupation(s): critic, writer, screenwriter, journalist and mystic

Ghassem Hasheminezhad or Ghasem Hasheminejad (Persian: قاسم هاشمی‌نژاد; September 24, 1940 – April 1, 2016) was a Persian Literary critic, writer, journalist, screenwriter and sufi. Nezhad was the author of the novel ‘Elephant in the Dark’. He was a critic and author who has worked for the Ayandegan newspaper.
