= Moussa Zargar =

Iranian politician (1935–2020)

Mousa Zargar (Persian: موسی زرگر) (1935 – March 12, 2020) was an Iranian politician, physician, and general surgeon. He was assigned as the second minister of health of Iran after revolution.
