= Naser Maleknia =

Iranian professor

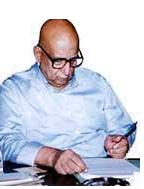
Naser Maleknia

Naser Maleknia (in Persian: ناصر ملك نيا; died 15 June 2007) was a pioneering Iranian clinical biochemist and a distinguished professor of Tehran University.

Maleknia studied chemical engineering and principles of medicine in the USA then moved to France where he studied medicine and take PHD degree in biochemistry and started research activities on clinical biochemistry. He became a full professor of biochemistry and a director of the department of Biochemistry at Tehran University.

Maleknia was an inspiring and dedicated teacher of biochemistry who trained several generations of Iranian physicians.

Professor Naser Maleknia died on 15 June 2007 in Tehran.

== See also ==
- Intellectual movements in Iran
