= Ahmad Human =

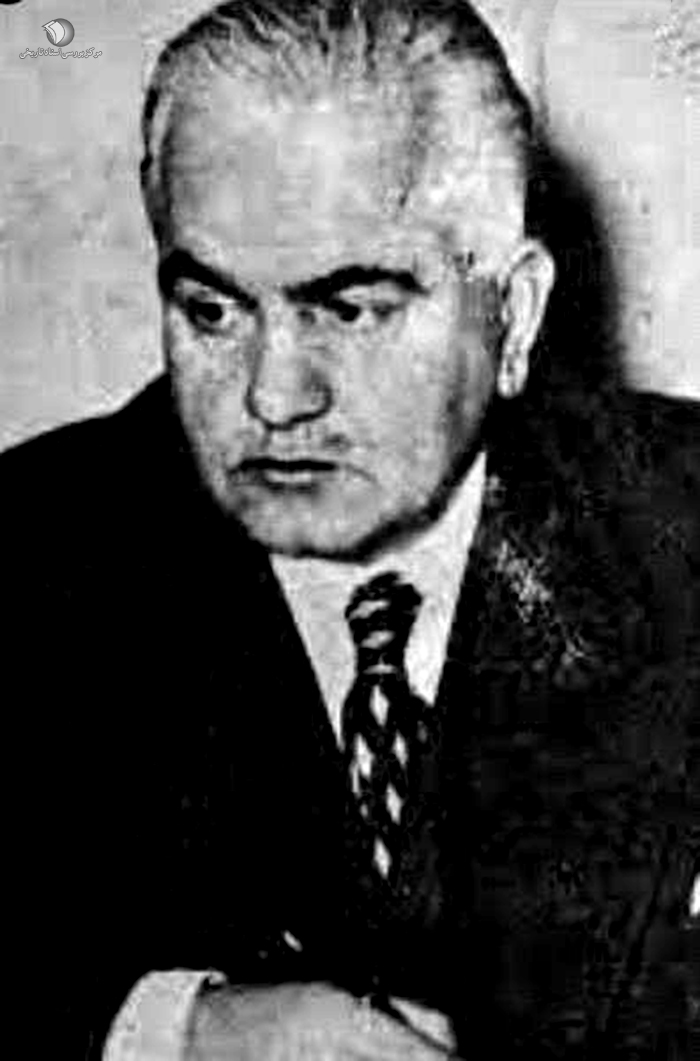
- Dr. Ahmad Human, President of the Bar Association in 1968

Acting Minister of Court
- In office February 1950 – 1951
- Monarch: Mohammad Reza Pahlavi
- Prime Minister: Hossein Ala

Deputy prime minister and head of propaganda
- In office 1950–1950
- Prime Minister: Ali Mansur

Personal details
- Born: 1909 Tehran,
- Died: 1995 Tehran,
- Party: Justice Party
- Education: Doctorate in Law from Paris
- Occupation: Lawyer and politician

Ahmad Human (Persian: احمد هومن) was an Iranian jurist and politician. He served as the deputy prime minister and acting minister of court. He is the brother of Mahmoud Human.

== Life ==
His father, Haj Reza Gholi Khan (Persian: حاج رضا قلی خان), was from the esteemed guilds of Tehran. He completed his primary education in modern schools. He then entered Dar ul-Funun and received his diploma. Subsequently, he earned a bachelor's degree from the High School of Law. He spent some time teaching in Fars. He then joined the judiciary and was sent to Europe on a scholarship for further studies. In Paris, he obtained a doctorate in law.

He returned to Iran in 1938. His first judicial position was as the president of the Misdemeanor Court. He was then appointed as the prosecutor of Tabriz for about a year. He was later transferred to Tehran, where Majid Ahi, the then minister of justice, appointed him as the prosecutor of Tehran. He held this position for over three years. Afterward, he became the president of the Court of Cassation.

From 1943, Human engaged in political activities alongside his judicial career. He became a member of the Justice Party and assumed the editorship of the Nedaye Edalat newspaper, the party's organ. At the same time, he joined the faculty of University of Tehran and taught rural law at the Faculty of Agriculture. He, along with Major General Hassan Erfaf, the then Chief of Staff of the Army, and Colonel Dieyimi and several other officers, founded a party that engaged in nationalist activities.

Human became a member of the Government Employee Purification Committee in 1949. The committee reviewed nearly a thousand cases and classified employees into three categories: those who were essential for the government, those who should be dismissed, and those whose retention or dismissal was discretionary. The decisions of the Employee Purification Committee were announced early in the tenure of Prime Minister Razmara. Since most dignitaries and representatives were classified for dismissal, this caused a significant uproar. Some supported the committee, while others opposed it. General Fakher Hekmat, the Speaker of the National Consultative Assembly, was on the dismissal list and thus led the opposition. Eventually, the assembly nullified the committee's decisions, causing significant damage to Human's reputation, though he survived the ordeal.

In 1950, Human was appointed as the deputy prime minister for propaganda in Ali Mansur's cabinet. Razmara dismissed him, and Human remained unemployed until he was appointed as the deputy to the Ministry of Court. When Hossein Ala became the prime minister in February 1950, Human assumed the acting head of the Ministry of Court. However, after Ala's return to the court, Human still retained his deputy position.

After 1953, Human pursued a career in judiciary advocacy. As a distinguished jurist, he gained international recognition. After the resignation of Agha Seyed Hashem Vakil, Human served a four-year term as the president of the Bar Association of the Judiciary. He had joined a Freemasonry group in his youth. His family name was originally "Basiji." He died in 1995 in Tehran.
