= Asghar Ghandchi =

Iranian entrepreneur (1928–2019)

Asghar Gahndchi (Persian: اصغر قندچی; 1928 – July 2019) was an Iranian entrepreneur known as the father of Iran's trucking industry. He was the founder of Iran Kaveh (Saipa Diesel), the first trailer and truck manufacturing company without a foreign-assisted assembly line.

Prior to the Iranian Revolution, Shah Mohammad Reza Pahlavi's regime was interested in boosting the Iranian industry. As a result, the tendency was to favor companies with higher Iranian-built content.

Ghandchi was able to establish ties with Mack Trucks of the United States and started manufacturing trucks officially under their license. His company soon grew to 1,200 workers and he reached a capacity of roughly 2,000 trucks per year. Approximately 60% of these trucks were Iranian content while the rest was imported.

He had plans to start localizing the remaining 40% which included the engine as well. However, the Islamic Revolution would occur in 1979 and his plans had to be postponed.

After the Iran–Iraq War, although he had lost his authority in his own company, he tried establishing another company called Kaveh Kar to provide after-sales service and maintenance to existing Mack Trucks in Iran.

== Death ==
Ghandchi died at the age 91 in July 2019.

== Sources ==
- "اصغر قندچی؛ مردی که با کامیون آمد" [Asghar Ghandchi; the man who came by truck]. BBC (in Persian). 30 July 2019.
- "اصغر قندچی درگذشت / جزئیات مراسم پدر کامیون سازی ایران". بیت‌ ران (Bitrun) (in Persian). 29 July 2019.
- "اتاق بازرگانی، صنایع، معادن و کشاورزی تهران". tccim.ir.
