= Gholamhossein Shokouhi =

Iranian Academic and politician (1926–2016)

- غلامحسین شکوهی
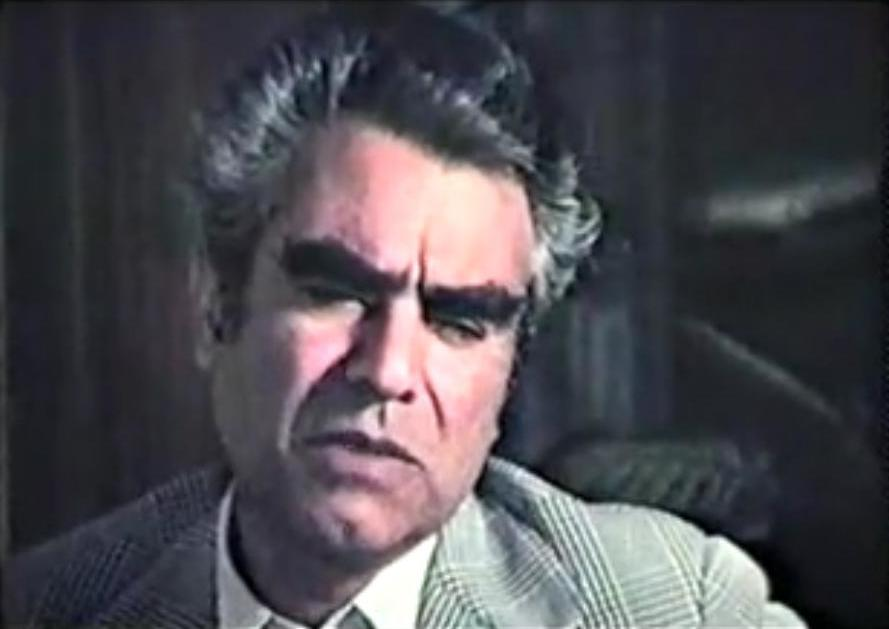

Ministry of Education
- In office 13 March 1979 – 9 September 1979
- Preceded by: Mohammad-Amin Riahi
- Succeeded by: Mohammad-Ali Rajai

Personal details
- Born: 22 June 1926 Khus
- Died: 5 May 2016 (aged 89)
- Occupation: Professor, politician
- Profession: Tarbiat Modares University، University of Birjand

Gholamhossein Shokouhi (22 June 1926 – 5 May 2016) known as the Father of Iranian Education, was one of the oldest educators and the first Minister of Education of the Islamic Republic of Iran. He had a PhD in Educational Sciences and, due to his 60 years of experience in education and research, he was considered a lasting figure in Iranian education.

== Education and Academic Background ==
Shokouhi was born on July 22, 1926, in the city of Khusf, Birjand. He received his early education at Shokatiyeh School and after completing the preparatory course, he began teaching in Birjand. After receiving his diploma, he entered the Higher Education Institute of Tehran to continue his studies and received his bachelor's degree in elementary education in 1956. Then, as the first student of the Higher Education Institute of Tehran, he was sent to Switzerland on a government scholarship and received his doctorate in education in 1962. After returning to Iran, he served in the Ministry of Education and at the same time taught at the Higher Education Institute of Tehran.

== Ministry and After ==
He was appointed as the first Minister of Education in the interim government in 1979 after the Iranian Revolution (1979). In 1993, due to lung problems and air pollution in Tehran, he returned to his hometown and continued his teaching and research activities with the rank of professor at University of Birjand. After 57 years of teaching, he retired in 1999 with the rank of 26th professor, but he did not give up teaching and continued to teach at Birjand and Tarbiat Modares Universities in Tehran. However, in 1990, after the death of his wife, he suffered from severe depression and gave up his teaching and research activities.

== Works ==
Among his works in the field of authorship are "Methods of Learning Arithmetic and Geometry", "Fundamentals of Education" with 45 reprints, "Education and Training and Its Stages" with 20 reprints, and in the field of translation, "Education and Training" by Emmanuel Canto and "Great Teachers" by Jean Chano. Dr. Shokohi has published more than 60 articles in domestic scientific journals and two articles in reputable foreign journals.

== Death ==
Shokouhi passed away on Thursday, May 5, 2016 at the age of 89.
