= Asghar Bichareh =

Iranian photographer and actor

- اصغر بیچاره
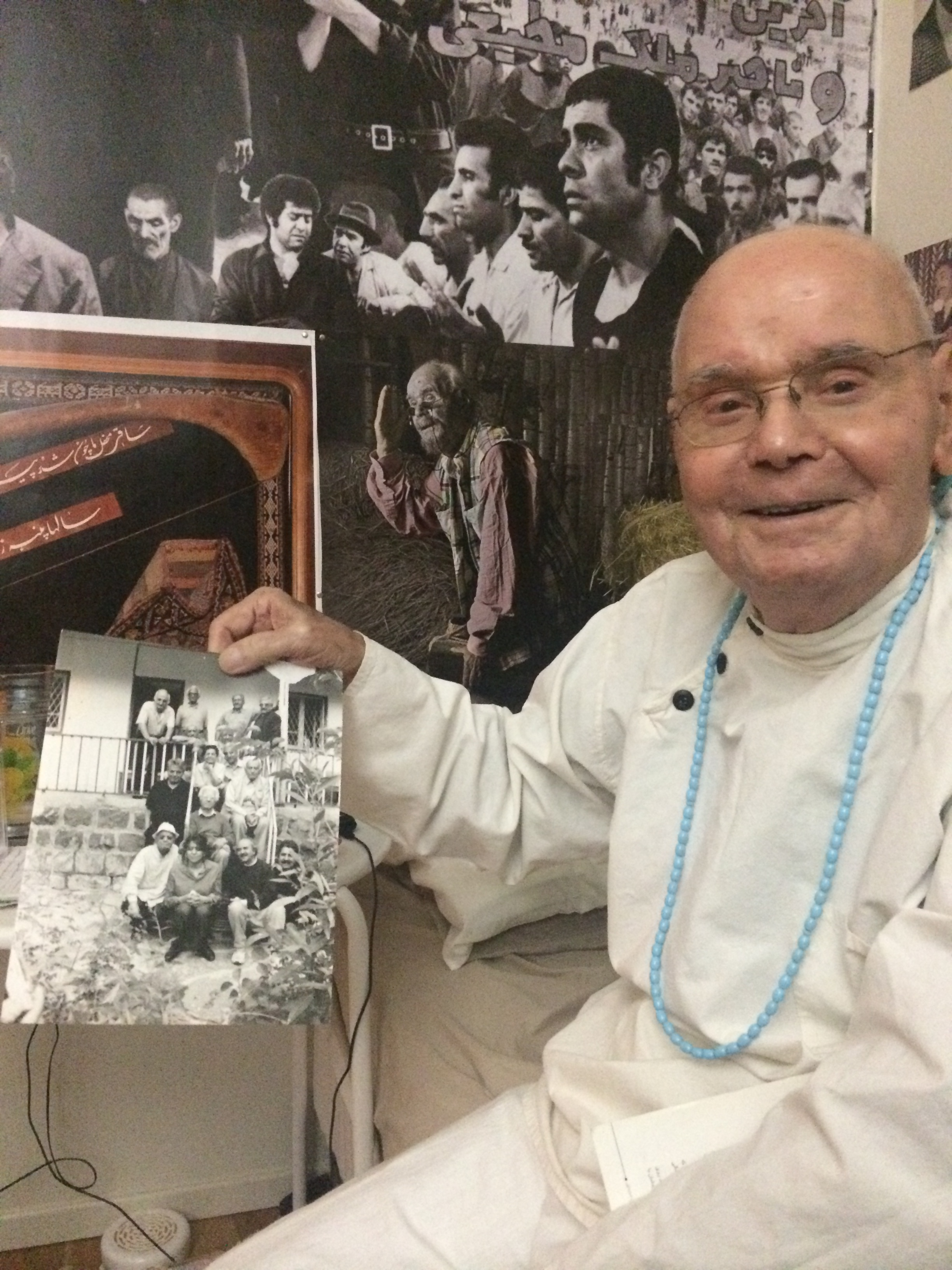
- Asghar Bichareh at his home in Los Angeles in 2014
- Born: June 11, 1927; Tehran, Iran
- Died: June 11, 2016; Los Angeles, USA
- Other names: Asghar Jouleh
- Known for: Photography
- Children: Touraj Jouleh

Asghar Bichareh (June 11, 1927 – June 11, 2016; Persian: اصغر بیچاره) was an Iranian photographer and actor. Bichareh was a photographer for the Iranian film and music industries, as well as having a studio and acting in over 23 films. He died of laryngeal cancer in 2016 in Los Angeles, where he spent the last few years of his life. Bichareh was also known for his extensive collection of old cameras and cinema and theater photos. He had the second largest collection of photography cameras in Iran after Mohammad-Ali Jadidoleslam.
