= Valiollah Khakdan =

Iranian film director (1923–1996)

- ولی الله خاکدان

Valiollah Khakdan (1923 – 1996) (Persian: ولی الله خاکدان) was an Iranian art director and accomplished set designer.

Born in Baku, Azerbaijan, he graduated from the faculty of painting at the Art School there and started his career as an art director with Prince's Prisoner (1998, E. Koushan). He immigrated to Iran in 1938. Due to his background in painting, he became a set designer in theatres of Tabriz. He is known as a pioneer of set designing in Iranian cinema. He moved to Tehran in 1946 and worked in the bigger theatres. Although he had a limited experience and background in Iranian cinema, made some decorations for historical films which are among the memorable and outstanding examples. He was one of the supervisors for building a small town for IRIB as the location of historical films and TV series.

== Filmography ==
- Golden Dreams, 1951
- The Mother, 1952
- Mashdi Ebaad, 1953
- Eagle of Tous
- The Bride of Tigris, 1954
- Fabulous Amir Arsalan (first version), 1955
- Yousuf and Zoleikha (first version), 1956
- Ladder of Progress
- Jacob Leis, 1957
- Bizhan and Manizheh
- Ray of Hope
- The Broken Spell, 1958
- Spring of Life Water, 1959
- Arshin Malalan, 1960
- You Have Mistaken Me, Madam!
- Bitter Honey
- Midnight's Cry, 1961
- Aras Khan, 1963
- Fabulous Amir Arsalan (second version)
- Hossein Kurd Shabestary, 1966
- Diamond 33
- Nasim Ay'yar, 1987
- Dragon Cape
- Yousuf and Zoleikha (second version), 1968
- Breed of Braves, 1969
- Leili and Madjnoun, 1970
- Abbaseh and Djafar Barmaki, 1972
- The Sleeping Lion, 1977
- Kamalolmolk, 1984
- Mirza Norouz's Shoes, 1985
- The First Deputy, 1986
- The Magnificent Day (co), 1988
- Great Expectation
- Kakado (co), 1994
