= Mohammad Hassan Zolfaghari =

Iranian basketball player and coach

Mohammad Hassan Zolfaghari (well known as Amoo Hassan) was an Iranian professional basketball player (1967–1971) and Iran's Head coach (1981). He played as the forward position. Zolfagari was also the head coach of Faravahar (Zoroastrian Team of Iran, 1974–1994) as well as "Shahin of Tehran" (1972–1979).

== Death ==
In September 2013, he died after a long illness.
