= Ahmad Aramesh =

Iranian politician (1908–1973)

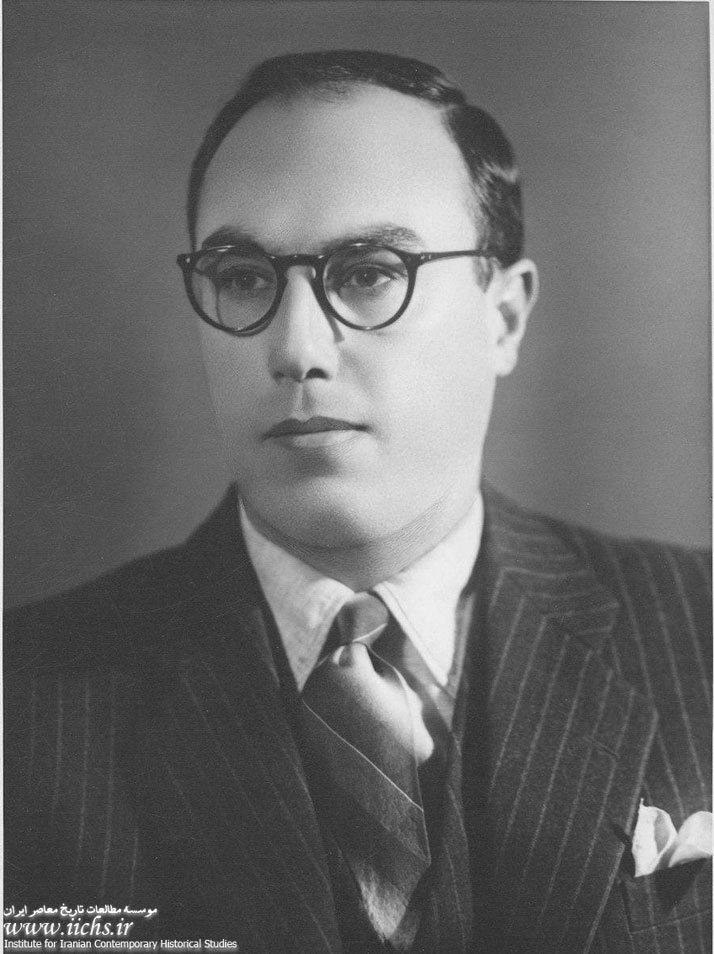

National Planning Organization of Iran
- Monarch: Mohammad Reza Pahlavi
- Prime Minister: Jafar Sharif Emami
- Preceding: Reza Fallah
- Succeeded by: Safi Asfia

Personal details
- Born: 1908 Yazd
- Died: 1973 (aged 64–65) Laleh Park
- Party: Democrat Party of Iran

Ahmad Aramesh (1908, Yazd – 1973, Tehran) was a controversial politician during the reign of Mohammad Reza Pahlavi, who was ultimately imprisoned and killed.

== ‌Beginning ==
He began his education in Yazd and completed it at the American College in Tehran. He was employed by the Ministry of Roads and later transferred to the newly established Ministry of Industry, Art, and Commerce in 1941. He became the head of accounting and, in October 1945, was appointed the Director General of Financial Affairs.

== Political career ==
Aramesh then served as Deputy Minister of Commerce and Industry and, in December 1946, became the Minister of Labor and Propaganda in the cabinet of Prime Minister Qavam al-Saltaneh. After Qavam founded the Democratic Party of Iran, Aramesh became actively involved in the party and was eventually appointed the Deputy Secretary-General, overseeing the party's propaganda activities. He turned the newspapers Bahrām and Diplomat, of which he was the director and license holder, into party organs and was elected President of the Journalists' Association.

After the fall of Qavam's cabinet, although Aramesh did not hold any official government position, he remained actively involved in politics. During the 1953 coup d'état, he served as a liaison between various individuals and Kermit Roosevelt, distributing funds among them and organizing groups to stage demonstrations in the city center. Following the coup, on December 8, 1954, he was appointed a member of the Supervisory Board of the Planning Organization by a vote of Parliament. When his brother-in-law, Jafar Sharif-Emami, became Prime Minister in 1960, he appointed Aramesh as Minister without Portfolio and head of the Plan Organization.

After taking charge of the Plan Organization, Aramesh began to expose corruption, accusing Abolhassan Ebtehaj, the former director of the organization, of significant embezzlement. His speeches in the National Consultative Assembly (20th session) and his interviews brought widespread attention to the issue of misconduct within the organization. In response, Ebtehaj defended himself and denied these allegations.

== Imprisonment and assassination ==
Jafar Sharif-Emami's cabinet fell due to Aramesh's exposés, along with a teachers' strike and an economic crisis. Aramesh's tenure as head of the Plan Organization lasted less than three months. Afterward, he began opposing the government and later the Shah, distributing statements that led to his arrest, trial, and death sentence. His sentence was commuted, and he spent a total of seven years in prison. He attempted suicide several times but was saved. In 1973, with the intervention of Sharif-Emami, he was released from prison. However, shortly after, he was shot and killed by security forces in Farah Park (now Laleh Park) in Tehran. Newspapers reported that a "saboteur named Ahmad Aramesh, who intended to assassinate officers, was killed.

Aramesh was buried in Section 7, Row 53, Plot 30 of Behesht-e Zahra Cemetery in Tehran. After the revolution, a book titled Seven Years in the Prison of Aryamehr was published under his name. It is said that, apart from a few pages, the rest of the book was written by Esmaeil Raein.
