= 1920 in Iran =

- Decades
- See also: Other events of 1920; Years in Iran

The following lists events that happened during 1920 in Qajar era.

== Incumbents ==
- Monarch: Ahmad Shah Qajar
- Prime Minister: Vosugh od-Dowleh (until July 3), Hassan Pirnia (July 3 – October 27), Fathollah Khan Akbar (starting October 27)

== Events ==
- January 21 – Battle of Shekar Yazi.
- May 18 – Anzali Operation.

== Births ==
- January 13 – Jahangir Amouzegar, Iranian politician.
- January 24 – Abdol Ali Badrei, Iranian general.
- February 1 – Farideh Ghotbi, The mother of Farah Pahlavi.
- March 9 – Mohammad Amir Khatami, Iranian pilot and association football player.
- June 9 – Abdurrahman Sharafkandi, Kurdish poet.
- June 18 – Enayatollah Reza, Iranian historian and encyclopedist.
- July 16 – Ahmad Qadakchian, Iranian actor.
- July 26 – Taghi Rouhani, Iranian radio personality.
- August 22 – Hooshang Seyhoun, Iranian architect, artist and academic.
- September 2 – Hamid Notghi, Iranian poet, writer and faculty.
- September 16 – Mohammad Karim Pirnia, Iranian architect.
- November 9 – Alenush Terian, Iranian astronomer.
- December 12 – Salim Neisari, Iranian writer.
- ? – Abdol-Aziz Mirza Farmanfarmaian, Iranian architect.
- ? – Ahmad Nafisi, Iranian bureaucrat.
- ? – Fakhereh Saba, Iranian opera singer.
- ? – Fereydun Adamiyat, social historian.
- ? – George Ovadiah, Iraqi-born Israeli and Iranian screenwriter and film director.
- ? – Gholam Hossein Jahanshahi, Iranian politician.
- ? – Haj Qorban Soleimani, Iranian musician.
- ? – Hayk Mirzayans, entomologist.
- ? – Jahangir Oshidri.
- ? – Jalil Ziapour, Iranian painter.
- ? – Mahmoud Zoufonoun, Persian musician.
- ? – Mohammad-Hadi Shadmehr, Iranian military officer.
- ? – Sadeq Kia, Iranian historian and linguist.
- ? – Ehsan Yarshater, Iranian historian and linguist.

== Deaths ==
- January 28 – Mirza Sayyed Mohammad Tabatabai, Iraqi Shi'a theologian.
- February 28 – Hajj Nematollah, Iranian Kurdish scholar.
- April 3 – Sheyda Gerashi, Iranian poet.
- August 17 – Mirza Taqi al-Shirazi, Iraqi cleric.
- September 14 – Mohammad Khiabani, Iranian politician.
- September 15 – Taqi Rafat, Iranian poet.
- October 23 – Forsat-od-Dowleh Shirazi, Iranian poet, literary and musician.
- ? – Fethullah Qa'ravi Isfahani, Iranian cleric.
