= Imamzadeh Abdollah, Ray =

Shi'ite funerary complex in Tehran province, Iran

Imamzadeh Abdollah
- امامزاده عبدالله
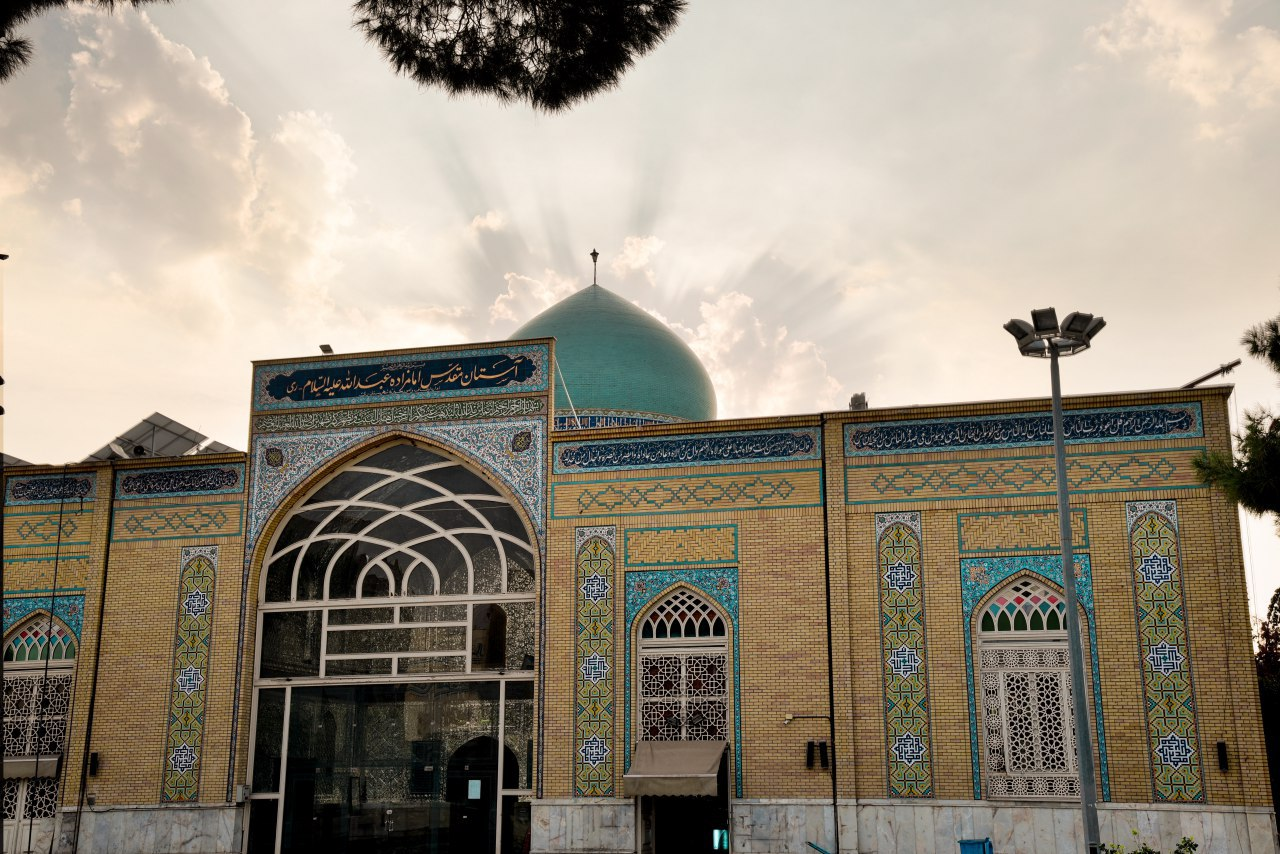

- Location in Tehran

Religion
- Affiliation: Shia Islam
- Ecclesiastical or organisational status: Imamzadeh
- Status: Active

Location
- Location: Ray, Ray County, Tehran province
- Country: Iran
- Interactive map of Imamzadeh Abdollah
- Coordinates: 35°35′47″N 51°26′13″E

Architecture
- Type: Islamic architecture
- Style: Safavid; Qajar
- Completed: 1530 CE

Specifications
- Dome: One
- Materials: Bricks; mortar; tiles

Iran National Heritage List
- Official name: Imamzadeh Abdollah
- Type: Built
- Designated: 4 May 1999
- Reference no.: 2313
- Conservation organization: Cultural Heritage, Handicrafts and Tourism Organization of Iran

The Imamzadeh Abdollah (Persian: امامزاده عبدالله) is a Shi'ite imamzadeh complex located in the Ray district of southern Tehran province, Iran. The complex includes a cemetery and contains the graves of many notable individuals.

The complex was added to the Iran National Heritage List on 4 May 1999, administered by the Cultural Heritage, Handicrafts and Tourism Organization of Iran.

== Notable burials ==
- Hossein-Qoli Khān Māfi Nezām os-Saltaneh (1832–1908) – Prime Minister of Iran (1906–07)
- Āghā Bābā Khāzeni (1850–1920)
- Rezāqoli Khān Nezām os-Saltaneh (fa) (1867–1924) – politician
- Adib Pishāvari (1844–1930) – Pakistani scholar and poet
- Javād Khān Saad od-Dowleh (1856–1930) – politician
- Esmāil Khān Qashqāi Sowlat od-Dowleh (fa) (1880–1932) – politician
- Mohammad Nejāt (fa) (1877–1933) – member of parliament
- Abdolhossein Teymourtāsh (1881–1933) – politician
- Rezāqoli Bāstāni (fa) (d. 1934) – member of parliament
- Mohammad Hussein Seif Emād al-Kottāb (1868–1936) – calligrapher
- Sheikh Khazal (1863–1936) – politician
- Eshāgh Khān Mofakham od-Dowleh (de) (1861–1939) – diplomat
- Mohammad-Hossein Borāzjāni (fa) (1870–1940) – political activist
- Taghi Arāni (1903–1940) – Marxist activist
- Prince Mohammad-Hāshem Mirzā Sheikh ol-Raees (fa) (1880–1940) – Qajar prince and poet
- Ali Naqdi Sardār Raf'at (fa) (d. 1941) – army general
- Ebrat Nāeini (fa) (1865–1942) – poet
- Vahid Dastgardi (1879–1942) – poet
- Abdollāh Hāmedi (fa) (1902–1943) – scholar
- Mostafā Nuriāni (fa) (1909–1943) – musician
- Taghi Shāyegan (fa) (d. 1943) – musician
- Khalil Saqafi A'lam od-Dowleh (fa) (1862–1944) – physician and diplomat
- Soleimān Eskandari (1877–1944) – politician
- Rezāqoli Zelli (fa) (1906–1946) – singer
- Habibollāh Zolfonoun (fa) (1860–1947) – scholar
- Sohrāb Dibā (fa) (1899–1947) – army officer and father of Empress Farah Pahlavi
- Tājmāh Āfāgh (fa) (d. 1947) – writer
- Asadollāh Zolfaqāri (fa) (d. 1947) – politician
- Abdolhossein Shahnāzi (fa) (d. 1948) – musician
- Mehdi Shariat-Razavi (fa) (1932–1953) – political activist
- Ahmad Qandchi (fa) (1934–1953) – political activist
- Mostafa Bozorgniā (fa) (1934–1953) – political activist
- Ezzatollāh Siāmak (d. 1954) – a founder of Tudeh Military Network
- Masoumeh Khākyār (fa) (1932–1954) – actress
- Toghrol Afshār (fa) (1933–1956) – journalist
- Mahmoud Vahid-Saad Vahid od-Dowleh (fa) (1883–1957) – member of parliament
- Bāgher Rāmeshgar (fa) (1873–1959) – musician
- Abdollāh Ahmadieh (1886–1959) – scholar
- Abolfazl Lesāni (fa) (1897–1959) – journalist
- Nimā Yooshij (1897–1960) – poet (in 1993, his body reburied in his house in Yush, Mazandaran)
- Sādegh Sarmad (fa) (1907–1960) – politician
- Asghar Tafakkori (fa) (1911–1960) – actor
- Ali Nasr (1895–1961) – dramatist
- Ahmad-Hossein Adl (1889–1963) – politician
- Fazlollāh Zāhedi (1892–1963) – Prime Minister of Iran (1953–55)
- Rezā Afshār (1887–1964) - statesman and aviation pioneer
- Ahmad Amir-Ahmadi (1884–1965) – army general
- Doust-Ali Moayyeri (fa) (1874–1966) – artist
- Hossein Qollar-Āqāsi (1890–1966) – painter
- Iskandar Mirza (1899–1969) – 1st President of Pakistan
- Ahmad Akhgar (fa) (1888–1970) – politician
- Mahmoud Khosrowpanāh Ezām os-Soltān (fa) (1886–1972) – army general
- Mehdi Bāmdād (1897–1973) – historian and biographer
- Nāder Ārāsteh (de) (1893–1974) – diplomat
- Jalāl Afshār (1894–1974) – scholar
- Abbās Massoudi (1895–1974) – journalist and politician
- Mohammad Mehrān (fa) (1898–1974) – mayor of Tehran
- Azizollāh Zarghāmi (1884–1978) – army general
- Habibiollāh Morād (fa) (1906–1978) – actor
- Abdolali Badrei (1919–1979) – army general
- Gholāmhossein Zahireddini (fa) (1911–1981) – musician
- Ali Dashti (1897–1982) – politician
- Mahmoud Karimi (fa) (1927–1984) – musician
- Rezā Rasouli (1892–1984) – politician and public figure, Minister of Trade and Economy in the Azerbaijan People's Government.
- Ali-Akbar Shahnāzi (1897–1985) – musician
- Badr-ol-Moluk Bāmdād (fa) (1898–1987) – journalist and activist
- Mohsen Moghaddam (fa) (1900–1987) – scholar
- Mahmoud Zolfaqāri (fa) (1902–1987) – member of parliament
- Rezā Sarrāfzādeh (fa) (1899–1988) – member of parliament
- Mehdi Barkeshli (fa) (1912–1988) – musician
- Mohammad-Ali Safariān (fa) (1929–1988) – translator
- Abolhassan Varzi (fa) (1915–1989) – poet
- Kāzem Hassibi (1906–1990) – politician
- Mohammad-Taghi Qomi (fa) (1910–1990) – cleric
- Hassan Mirkhāni (fa) (1912–1990) – calligrapher
- Abdollāh Vālā (fa) (1922–1990) – member of parliament
- Majid Mohseni (fa) (1923–1990) – actor
- Sādegh Amirazizi (1904–1991) – army general
- Houshang Tāheri (fa) (1934–1991) – writer
- Hossein Amirfazli (fa) (1920–1992) – actor
- Abbās Mehrpooyā (fa) (1927–1992) – singer
- Alirezā Afzalipour (1909–1993) – philanthropist
- Abolhassan Ebtehāj (1899–1999) – economist
- Yadollāh Sahābi (1906–2002) – politician
- Fākhereh Sabā (1920–2007) – singer
- Jafar Shahidi (1919–2008) – scholar
- Tourān Mirhādi (1927–2016) – scholar
- Pouran Shariat-Razavi (1934–2019) – scholar
- Ali Mirzāei (1929–2020) – weightlifter
- Baktāsh Ābtin (1974–2022) – writer

== See also ==
- List of imamzadehs in Iran
- Shia Islam in Iran

== Literature ==
- Atabaki, Touraj (2000). Azerbaijan: Ethnicity and the Struggle for Power in Iran. London: I.B.Tauris. p. 288. ISBN 9781860645549.
