= Salim Neisari =

Iranian linguist and author (1920–2019)

- سلیم نیساری
- Born: 12 December 1920; Tabriz, East Azerbaijan province, Sublime State of Iran
- Died: 12 January 2019 (aged 98); Paris, France
- Burial place: Namavaran Segmant, Behesht-e Zahra, Tehran, Iran
- Education: Bachelor's degree in Persian literature; Master's degree in Linguistics; Ph.D. in Philosophy
- Alma mater: University of Tehran; University of London; Indiana University
- Occupations: Professor of Persian literature; Version scholar; Iranian Cultural Advisor in Turkey; Head of UNESCO Technical Assistance Office; Author; Researcher
- Awards: Order of Persian Politeness (1st Order); A top-notch badge of Hafez Researcher

Salim Neisari (Persian: سلیم نیساری) was an Iranian Professor of Persian literature and a permanent member of Academy of Persian Language and Literature. He was born on 12 December 1920 in Tabriz, East Azerbaijan province, Iran and died on 12 January 2019 in Paris, France. He authored the first books on teaching Persian to non-Persian speakers.

== Early life and educations ==
Salim Neisari was born on 12 December 1920 in Tabriz, East Azerbaijan Province, Iran. After completing his primary education there, he entered the training college of Tabriz and graduated with a first degree, then he went to Tehran and entered the University of Tehran. In 1942, He received a bachelor's degree in Persian literature from University of Tehran. In 1950, After completing his studies in Persian literature, he went to Europe and continued his studies at the University of London. He received a master's degree in linguistics from the University of London. After that he went to United States and received his doctorate in philosophy from Indiana University.

== Careers ==
In 1942, Salim Nisari was employed by the Ministry of Culture and Islamic Guidance and held positions such as Secretary of the Ministry of Culture, Head of the Ministry's Office, Ministerial Inspector and Advisor to the Minister of Culture.

In 1944, he assumed the deputy in Faculty of Literature at Shiraz University.

In 1955, he served as elected associate professor in Kharazmi University (at that time it was called High Training College of Tehran). Thereafter, in 1956, he served as associate professor there.

In 1957, Salim Nisari was recruited by the UNESCO Central Secretariat in Paris and was appointed as Head of the UNESCO Technical Assistance Office. On this position, due to a mission from UNESCO's General Director, he traveled to countries in North Africa and Middle East and Southwest Asia for guidance on how UNESCO's scientific and cultural assistance program should be improved.

In 1965, after completing his UNESCO mission and returning to Iran, He was appointed as General Director of Cultural Relations at the Ministry of Education.

In 1967, he became a professor and transferred to the Faculty of Educational Sciences of the University of Tehran.

In 1977, Neisari traveled to Turkey on a mission from the University of Tehran and the Ministry of Culture and Arts with the role of Cultural Advisor, and returned to Iran in 1979 after the mission ended.

Eventually in 1980, Salim Neisari retired at his own request after 38 years of service.

In 2003, He became a permanent member of the Academy of Persian Language and Literature.

== Death ==
Salim Neisari died on 12 January 2019 in Paris, France at age 98 due to old age and stomach disease. Salim Nisari's body was moved from Paris to Tehran and buried at Namavaran Segment of Behesht-e Zahra, Tehran, Iran.

== Bibliography ==
- Tarikhe Adabiate Iran Bad az Eslam, title means: History of Iranian Literature After Islam, 1947
- Tarikhe Adabiate Iran, title means: History of Iranian Literature, 1949
- Tambrhaye Iran, title means: Iran stamps, 1961
- Koliate Raveshe Tadris dar Dabirestan, title means: General Teaching Method in High School, 1965
- Osoole Tamrine Dabiri va Koliate Raveshe Tadris dar Dabirestan, title means: Principles of Teachering Practice and General Teaching Method in High School, 1965
- Tadrise Zabane Farsi dar Dabestan ya Amouzeshe Honarhaye Zaban, title means: Teaching Persian language in elementary school or language arts education, 1965
- Nemoonehayi az Asare Javidane Shere Farsi, title means: Examples of eternal works of Persian poetry, 1971
- Ghazalhaye Hafez, title means: Hafez sonnets, 1974
- Moghaddameyi bar Tadvine Ghazalhaye Hafez, title means: Introduction to the compilation of Hafez's sonnets, 1988
- Daftare Digarsaniha dar Ghazalhaye Hafez, title means: The book of others like in Hafez's sonnets, 1994
- Dastoure Khatte Farsi: Pajouheshi Darbareye Peyvastegie Khatte Farsi ba Zabane Farsi, title means: Persian Script Grammar, A Study of the Relationship between Persian Script and Persian Language, 1995
- Divane Hafez: Bar Asase Noskhehaye Khattie Sadeye Nohom, title means: The Divan of Hafez: Based on manuscripts of the ninth century, 1998
- Divane Hafez ba Miniatorhayi az Ostad Farshchian, title means: The Divan of Hafez with miniatures by Master Farshchian, 2003
- Darse Enshaye Farsi, title means: Persian essay lesson
- Ketabe Avvale Farsi: Dara va Sara ba Doostan, title means: First Book of Persian Primary School (Dara and Sarah with Friends)
- Farsi Yad Begirid, title means: Learn Persian
- Rahnamaye Mikalemeye Engelisi va Farsi, title means: English and Persian Conversation Guide
- Bargozideyi az Ghazalhaye Hafez, title means: A selection of Hafez sonnets
- Bargozideyi az Ghazalhaye Saadi, title means: A selection of Saadi sonnets

== Awards ==
- Order of Persian Politeness (1st Order), March 2, 2010
- A top-notch badge of Hafez Researcher, 2008

== See also ==
- Abdolmohammad Ayati
- Mohammad-Taqi Bahar
- Ali-Akbar Dehkhoda
- Badiozzaman Forouzanfar
- Houshang Moradi Kermani
- Manouchehr Sotoudeh
