= Abdolmohammad Ayati =

Iranian author, translator and researcher

- عبدالمحمد آیتی
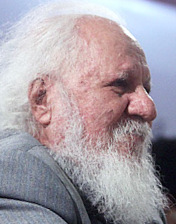
- Born: 5 May 1926; Borujerd, Borujerd County, Lorestan Province, Iran
- Died: 11 September 2013 (aged 87); Tehran, Iran
- Burial place: Namavaran Segmant, Behesht-e Zahra
- Education: Bachelor of Theology, Faculty of Rational and Alterable Studies, University of Tehran
- Occupations: Author; Arabic to Persian translator; Chief editor
- Notable work: Persian translation of Nahj al-Balagha; Persian translation of Quran; Persian translation of Al-Sahifa al-Sajjadiyya; Persian translation of Muqaddimah; Persian translation of Islamic State History in Andalusia; Persian translation of History of Arabic Language Literature; Persian translation of History of Philosophy in the Islamic World
- Awards: Order of Persian literature (1st Order); Elected at Second Period of Iranian Science and Culture Hall of Fame; Iran's Book of the Year Awards

Abdolmohammad Ayati (Persian: عبدالمحمد آیتی; 5 May 1926 – 11 September 2013) was an Iranian author, translator and researcher in the field of philosophy, history and Persian and Arabic literature. He was born on 5 May 1926 in Borujerd, Borujerd County, Lorestan Province, Iran and died on 11 September 2013 in Tehran, Iran. He was selected at the second Iran's Book of the Year Awards for Arabic to Persian translation of the book History of Arabic Language Literature.

== Early life and education ==
Abdolmohammad Ayati was born on 5 May 1926 in Borujerd, Borujerd County, Lorestan Province, Iran.He completed his elementary education there. In 1941, Ayati entered high school and in his final years, became interested in the study of religious sciences and went to the NourBakhsh Seminary School where he studied Islamic sciences for several years.

In 1946, He entered the Faculty of Rational and Alterable Studies which is called Faculty of Theology and Islamic Studies today, at University of Tehran and received his BA there.

== Career ==
After obtaining a bachelor's degree, he joined the Ministry of Education and went to Babol to teach. He has been teaching for over 30 years in Tehran and in the other cities of Iran and has served as chief editor of the Ministry of Education's monthly magazine and has taught Persian and Arabic literature at Farabi University and Damavand University.

In 1961, for the first time he wrote an article called Swamp which published in Ketabe Hafteh magazine. After that he translated and released the book Ship Wreck written by Rabindranath Tagore.

In 1969, he came to Tehran at the suggestion of the Educational Publishing Center, where he worked. He has served as chief editor of the Ministry of Education's monthly magazine for 10 years until he retired in 1980.

Before retirement, he had published the books Swamp, Ship Wreck, Golden Carriage, History of Wisdom Writing and Translating the Calendar of Countries.

During his retirement he translated Al-Abar, history written by Ibn Khaldun into six volumes and translated books such as the History of Islamic State in Andalusia into 5 volumes and the History of Arabic language literature and the History of philosophy in the Islamic world, etc.

He was a famous translator of Arabic to Persian and has published the Persian translations of the Quran, Nahj al-Balagha and Al-Sahifa al-Sajjadiyya.

Until his death, Ayati was a permanent member of the Academy of Persian Language and Literature and chairs the Scientific Council of the Encyclopedia of Literary Research there.

== Death ==
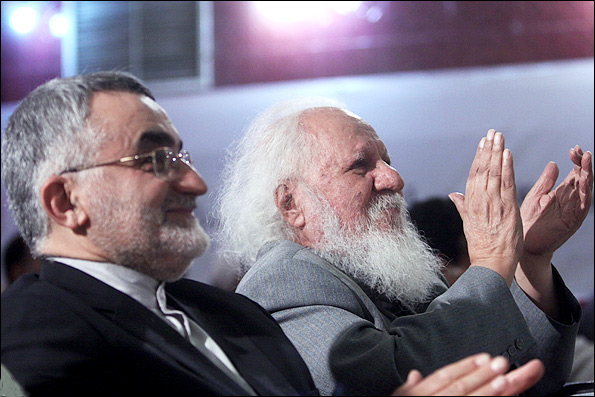
Abdolmohammad Ayati, in his commemoration ceremony (31 July 2011)

Abdolmohammad Ayati died on 11 September 2013 in Imam Hossein Hospital, Tehran, Iran at age 87 due to cardiac arrest.

He buried at Namavaran Segment of Behesht-e Zahra, Tehran, Iran.

Many Iranian officials and authorities sent condolences for his death.

== Bibliography ==
=== Compilations ===
- Moallaght Sabe, Seven Pendants, 1966
- Tahrire Tarikhe Vassaf, Writing of the Descriptioned History, 1967
- Dastane Khosro va Shirin, The Story of Khosrow and Shirin, Poem by Nizami Ganjavi, 1974
- Shokouhe Ghasideh, The glory of the ode, 1985
- Gozideye Makhzanol Asrar: Az Panj Ganje Nezami Ganjavi, Selected of Secrets Reservoir: From Five Treasures of Nizami Ganjavi, 1988
- Gozideye Khosro va Shirin, Brief of Khosrow and Shirin, Poems by Nizami Ganjavi, 1991
- Gozideye Leili va Majnoon, Brief of Layla and Majnun, Poems by Nizami Ganjavi, 1991
- Gozideye Eskandarnameh, An excerpt from Nizami Ganjavi's Eskandarnameh, 1993
- Ganjoure Panj Ganj: Gozideh Ashare Nezami Ganjavi, Treasurer five treasure: Selection of Nizami Ganjavi poems, 1995
- Sharhe Manzoomeye Manli va Panzdah Gheteye Digar az Nima Yooshij, Description of the Manley Epopee and fifteen other pieces by Nima Yooshij, 1996
- Renda, Renda: Twenty stories from twenty contemporary Syrian writers, 1997
- Pire Neishabour, An old man from Nishapur: An excerpt from Attar's poems, 1997
- Raze Sakhreha: Majmoueye Dastan, The Secret of the Rocks: A Story Collection, 1998
- Ghesseye Barbod va 20 Ghesseye Digar az Shahnameh, The Story of Barbod and 20 Other Story from Shahnameh, 2001
- Dar Tamame Toule Shab, In All the Night Duration, explanation for four long poems of Nima Yooshij, 2004
- Safireh Sokhan, Ambassador of the Speech: A Collection of Articles by Professor Abdolmohammad Ayati on Literary Criticism, Theology and Mysticism, History and History of Islam, 2006
- Tafsiri bar Shere Shamsol Manaqeb, An Interpretation of Shams al-Manaqib's Poetry by Shams al-Shoa'ra Soroush Esfahani, Poem by Soroush Esfahani, 2008
- Baharestane Sokhan, Springiness of the Speech, 2009

=== Translations ===
- Kashtie Shekasteh, Ship Wreck, by Rabindranath Tagore, 1961
- Taghvim al-Baladaan, Calendar of Countries, by Abu'l-Fida, 1970
- Ghazalhaye Abu Nuwas, Abu Nuwas sonnets, by Abu Nuwas, 1971
- Tarikhe Falsafeh dar Jahane Eslami, History of Philosophy in the Islamic World, by Hanna Al-Fakhoury, 1976
- Amorzesh, The Epistle of Forgiveness, by Al-Ma'arri, 1978
- Tarikhe Adabiate Zabane Arabi, History of Arabic language literature, by Hanna Al-Fakhoury, 1982
- Darbareye Falsafeye Eslami: Ravesh va Tatbigh An, About Islamic Philosophy: The method and its adaptation, by Ibrahim Madkour, 1982
- Al-Abar|Al-Abar: Tarikhe Ibne Khaldoun, The Lessons: History written by Ibn Khaldun, 6 volumes, 1984–1992
- Tarikhe Dolate Eslami dar Andolos, History of Islamic State in Andalusia, by Muḥammad ʻAbd Allāh ʻInān, 5 volumes, 1987–1992
- Qurane Majid, Glorious Quran, 1992
- Tarjomeye Farsi Al-Gharat, Persian Translation of Al-Gharat, by Ibrahim Saqafi, 1992
- Hejaz dar Sadre Eslam, Hejaz in the early days of Islam: An investigation into civil and administrative affairs, by Ahmad Ali (Author)|Ahmad Ali, 1996
- Joze Siome Qurane Majid, Thirty Juz' of Quran: With Farsi translation and Quran teaching, 1996
- Nahj al-Balagha, Collection of Imam Ali sermons, letters and aphorisms, by Al-Sharif al-Radi, 1997
- Basi Ranj Bordam, I suffered a lot ...: Ferdowsi on the ups and downs, by Satem Vaqzadeh, 1998
- Mokhtasareh Tarikhod Doval, Brief History of States, by Bar Hebraeus, 1998
- Tafsire Hedayat, Interpretation of guidance, by Mohammad Taqi al-Modarresi, 1999
- Masjede Sharife Nabavi dar Toule Tarikh, Sharif Prophetic Mosque throughout history, by Abdolghader Ansari, 2000
- Shahnameye Ferdowsi, by Abul-Qâsem Ferdowsi, Arabic writing by Bondari Esfahani, 2001
- Majamal Odaba, Litterateur Glossary, by Yaqut al-Hamawi, 2002
- Havadesol JameEh: Rooydadhaye Gharne Haftome Hejri, Great events: 7th Century AH Events, by Kamalleddin Ibn Fouti, 2002
- Dadkhahi Heyvanat Nazd Padeshahe Parian az Setame Adamian, Animal lawsuit to the Fairy King of human oppression, by Brethren of Purity, 2003
- Nazmol Hoda, Organized Gifts: Ordered and prosed translation and description of Quran's Surah, by Ibrahim Sajjadi, 2004
- Sahifeye Sajjadieh, Al-Sahifa al-Sajjadiyya, by Ali ibn Husayn Zayn al-Abidin, 2005
- Fehreste Aelam Al-Abar (Al-Abar|Tarikhe Ibne Khaldoun), Announcement list of Al-Abar (History written by Ibn Khaldun), by Ibn Khaldun, 2005
- Ayzis, A Play written by Tawfiq al-Hakim, 2008
- Vaghaye Negari Khalijeh Fars: Bakhshe Tarikhe Iran, Persian Gulf Events: The History of Iran Section, by John Gordon Lorimer, 2009
- Iran dar Ketabe Nuzhat al-mushtāq fi'khtirāq al-āfāq, Iran in the book Tabula Rogeriana, by Muhammad al-Idrisi, 2009
- Shahrzad, Shahrzad, by Tawfiq al-Hakim, 2010

== Awards ==
- Selected at the second Iran's Book of the Year Awards for Arabic to Persian translation of the book History of Arabic language Literature, 1983
- Elected at Second Period of Iranian Science and Culture Hall of Fame, 2002
- Order of Persian Politeness, (1st Order), 2011

== See also ==
- Mohammad-Taqi Bahar
- Ali-Akbar Dehkhoda
- Badiozzaman Forouzanfar
- Houshang Moradi Kermani
- Manouchehr Sotoudeh
- Mahmoud Mar'ashi Najafi
