= 1886 in Iran =

- Decades
- See also: Other events of 1886; Years in Iran

The following lists events that happened during 1886 in Qajar era.

== Incumbents ==
- Monarch: Naser al-Din Shah Qajar

== Births ==
- March 4 – Ebrahim Pourdavoud, Iranian translator, linguist, academic and Iranian poet.
- May 9 – Jabbar Baghtcheban, Iranian educator and inventor, founder of the first Iranian kindergarten and school for the deaf..
- November 7 – Mohammad-Taqi Bahar, Iranian Poet, writer, historian, scholar and politician.
- ? – Abdullah Khan Ahmadieh, Iranian physician.
- ? – Ali-Akbar Davar, Iranian politician.
- ? – Karim Buzarjomehri, Iranian general.
- ? – Lady Amin, Jurisprudent and theologian.
- ? – Majid Ahi, Iranian politician and diplomat.
- ? – Sulayman Hayyim, Iranian lexicographer and author.

== Deaths ==
- April 7 – Mirza Yusuf Ashtiani, Iranian politician.
