= Sotoudeh =

Sotoudeh is a surname found among Persian people. Notable people with this surname include:

- Nasrin Sotoudeh (born 1963), an Iranian human rights lawyer
- Manouchehr Sotoudeh (1913 – 2016), an Iranian geographer, literary scholar, and historian
