= 1892 in Iran =

- Decades
- See also: Other events of 1892; Years in Iran

The following lists events that happened during 1892 in Qajar era.

== Incumbents ==
- Monarch: Naser al-Din Shah Qajar

== Births ==
- January 13 – Mohammad-Ali Jamalzadeh, Iranian writer.
- February 10 – Abolqasem Najm, Iranian politician.
- February 10 – Bagher Kazemi, Iranian politician.
- February 25 – Abdullah Musawi Shirazi, Iranian grand ayatollah.
- May 17 – Fazlollah Zahedi, General, statesman.
- June 16 – Ali-Asghar Hekmat, Iranian politician.
- August 7 – Mohammad Taqi Pessian, Iranian politician.
- ? – Abbas Rassam Arjangi, Iranian painter.
- ? – Hossein Joudat, Iranian writer and politician.
- ? – Ja'far Pishevari, Chairman of the Azerbaijan Democratic Party and the National Government of Azerbaijan..
- ? – Khan Baba Motazedi, Iranian photographer.
- ? – Mirza Rida Quli Shari'at-Sanglaji, Iranian akhoond and theologian.
- ? – Muhammad Husayn Tabataba'i, Iranian Shia cleric, philosopher, jurist and mystic.
- ? – Reza Rasouli, Politician, participant in the 21 Azar Movement. Minister of Trade and Economy during the period of the Azerbaijan National Government..

== Deaths ==
- May 29 – Baháʼu'lláh, founder of the Bahá'í Faith.
- ? – Mirza Mohammad Reza Kalhor, Iranian calligrapher.
- ? – Shokouh al-Saltaneh, Iranian Qajar princess.
