= Katayun Mazdapour =

- Born: March 22, 1943 (age 83); Yazd, Yazd, Iran
- Education: University of Tehran
- Awards: Iran’s Book of the Year Awards, Iranian Researcher of the Year
- Scientific career
- Fields: Ancient Iranian Languages
- Workplaces: Institute for Humanities and Cultural Studies
- Doctoral advisor: Mehdi Aboulghasemi, Mehrdad Bahar

Katayun Mazdapour (Persian:کتایون مزداپور)(born March 22, 1943) is an Iranian linguist and a leading researcher in the realm of Old Iranian Languages. She studied in Anoushiravan Dadgar high school in Tehran and received her bachelors, masters, and PhD from the University of Tehran. She was advised by Mehdi Aboulghasemi and co-advised by Mehrdad Bahar. In 1981, she joined the Institute for Humanities and Cultural Studies as an assistant research professor and she retired as a professor in 2012 from the same institution. In 1997, she won the title of Iranian Researcher of the Year, because of her book The Dialect of Zoroastrians of Yazd (In Persian). Her book, Word and its Meaning, from Middle Persian to Modern Persian, won the prestigious award of Iran’s Book of the Year Awards.

== Publications ==
- Dāstān-i Garshāsb, Tahmūras va Jamshīd, Gulshāh va matnhā-yi dīgar : barʹrasī-i dastnivīs-i M.Ū. 2, 1999
- Andarznamahʹhā-yi irānī, 2007
