= Reza Afshar =

Iranian statesman and commercial aviation pioneer

- رضا افشار
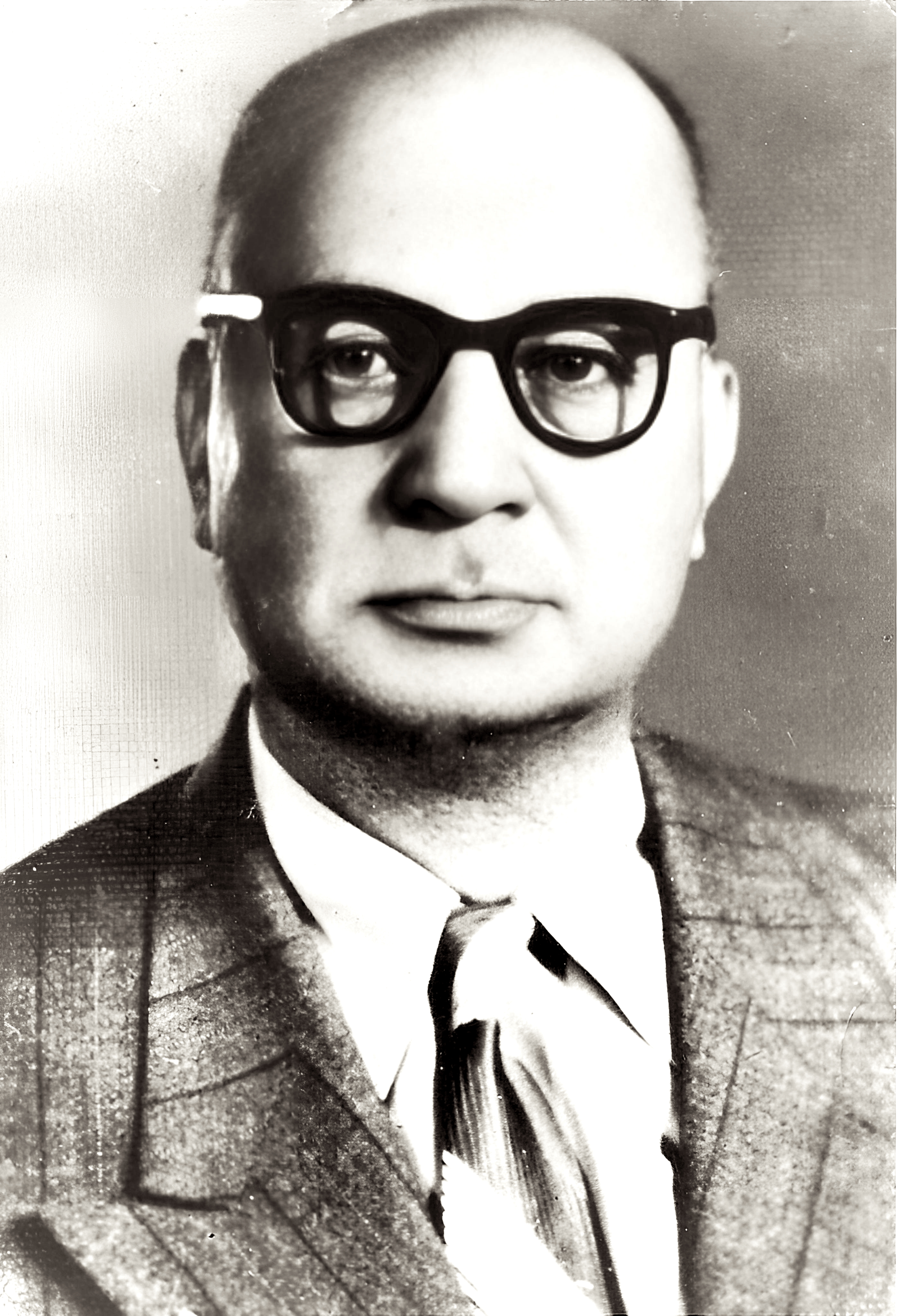

Minister of Roads and Transportation
- In office 1932–1932

Governor of Esfahan
- In office 1932–1936

Governor of Kerman
- In office 1931–1931

Governor of Gilan
- In office 1930–1930

Personal details
- Born: October 10, 1887 Urmia, Iran
- Died: February 5, 1964 (aged 76) Tehran, Iran
- Resting place: Emamzadeh Abdollah, Ray
- Citizenship: Iran
- Spouse: Sariyeh Azarbegi
- Children: 5
- Education: Wooster College; Valparaiso University; Columbia University
- Occupation: Statesman, aviation pioneer
- Known for: Founder and CEO of Iranian Airways (Iran Air)

Mirza Reza Khan Afshar (Persian: میرزا رضا خان افشار; 10 October 1887 – 5 February 1964) was an Iranian parliamentarian, three-time governor of Gilan, Kerman, and Esfahan; minister of roads and transportation, as well as the pioneering co-founder, chairman, and CEO of Iranian Airways (Iran Air). He is widely regarded as the "father of commercial aviation in Iran."

== Early Life and Background ==
Reza Afshar was born in Urmia, Azarbaijan. He adopted his last name from his mother who belonged to the Afshar tribe. His father Mirza Shafiʿ Khan Qarib was a native of Garakan near Ashtian and is identified in Yād-e Niyākān as Mosteshar ol-Molk, a landowning member of the bureaucracy.

== Education ==
Afshar attended the American Memorial School of Urmia, received classical instruction in Persian and Arabic from Sheikh Jalil Adib ol-Ulama, and earned his high-school diploma from the American College of Tehran (later Alborz High School). In 1909 he traveled to the United States where he attended Wooster College in Ohio and Valparaiso University in Indiana before pursuing political economy and public finance at Columbia University.

In June 1913 the exiled Seyyed Hassan Taqizadeh who had met Afshar in Urmia joined him in New York and became his roommate. Both were financially strapped and accepted an invitation by the Iranian Chargé d'Affaires Ali-Qoli Khan Nabil od-Dowleh and his American wife Florence to stay in their summer home in the Catskills where Afshar tutored their children in Persian.

== World War I Activities ==
=== Berlin ===
With the onset of World War I in July 1914 the German Embassy in New York took note of Afshar's articles in The New York American criticizing the 1907 Anglo-Russian Convention and the Russian invasion of Tabriz in 1911. Afshar was invited to meet with Ambassador Johann Heinrich von Bernstorff, naval attaché Karl Boy-Ed, and Austro-Hungarian ambassador Konstantin Dumba and together with Taqizadeh agreed to support the German war effort in the hope that their victory would expel the Anglo-Russian occupying armies from Persia.

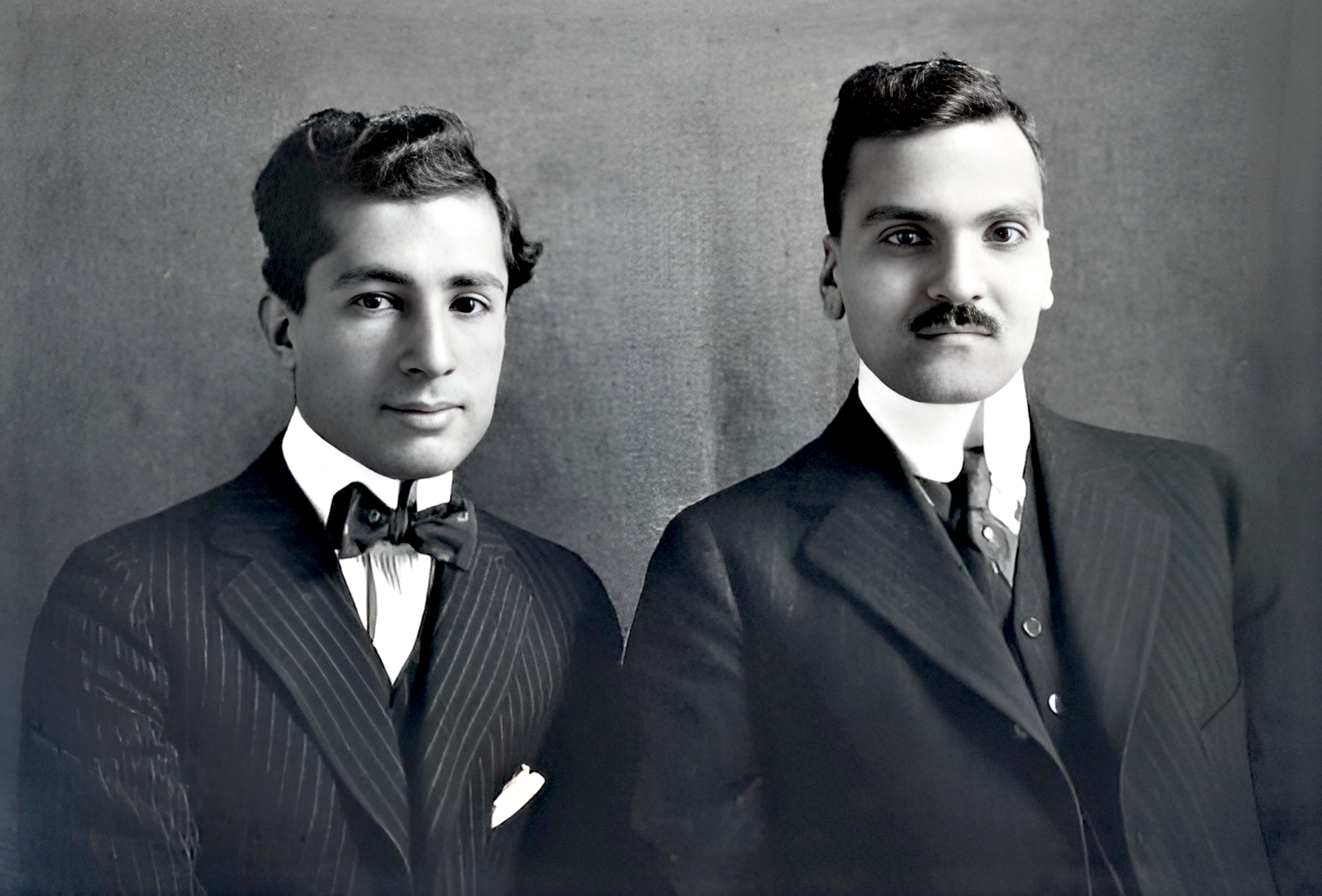
Reza Afshar (L) and Hasan Taqizadeh, NY 1914

Funded by the German Foreign Office, the two traveled to Berlin at the end of December 1914 where Afshar helped Taqizadeh form the Nationalist Iranian Committee and secure Germany's pledge to uphold Persia's territorial integrity should the Central Powers win the war.

=== Return to Iran ===
The Berlin committee dispatched Afshar to Kermanshah where he formed a guerilla group and fought pro-British tribes in Lorestan alongside Nezam al-Saltaneh Māfi, leader of the nationalist Mohajerin Provisional Government. Both Mafi's and Afshar's campaigns were eventually defeated and dispersed.

== Gilan and the Jangali Movement ==
In 1919 the central government appointed Afshar treasurer of the Islamic Unity Council, which administered Gilan and was centered in Rasht. At the time, the province was effectively governed by Mirza Kuchak Khan who had originally formed the Jangali guerillas in 1915 to resist Anglo-Russian imperialism and Qajar despotism. After the 1917 Russian Revolution he grew increasingly aligned with and beholden to the Kremlin, and at odds with the central government. In 1920 the pro-British Prime Minister Vosugh od-Dowleh offered to settle with Mirza and recognize his autonomy in Gilan provided he abandoned the Bolsheviks, and the British pledged to respect his territorial boundaries. Mirza was initially in favor but when the formal pledge arrived from Tehran, he rejected the offer.

Given the imminent secession of Gilan from Iran, Afshar resigned and left for Tehran where he helped Ali-Akbar Davar form the secular progressive Revival Party. In the interim, the Soviet Socialist Republic of Persia was proclaimed on 5 June 1920. Afshar's departure had cut off government subsidies to the revolutionaries, which generated a retaliatory rumor that he had fled with Jangali funds and turned him in the words of Joseph S. Iseman into a "high-ranking target of Russian terror." The rumor was spread by indiscriminate writers and Afshar's political opponents, among them the British spy Ardeshir Ji Reporter who viewed him as a threat to British interests and labeled him a Baha'i, a Freemason, and an ally of foreign powers.

== Public Service in the Pahlavi Era ==
=== Collaboration with Millspaugh ===
In 1922 Arthur C. Millspaugh, Administrator of Finance in Iran, hired Afshar as his deputy and chief interpreter following a referral letter by War Minister Reza Khan (later Reza Shah) who had met Afshar through Ali-Akbar Davar.

=== Political Career ===
Afshar was elected the first-time deputy for Urmia to the Fifth Majlis in 1923, re-elected to the Sixth, and served as Deputy Speaker of the Seventh Majles (Constituent Assembly) that deposed the Qajar dynasty in December 1925 and crowned Reza Shah Pahlavi. He went on to serve as Financial administrator of Gilan (1926), Governor of Gilan (1930) and Kerman (1931), Minister of Roads and Transportation (1932), and Governor of Esfahan (mid-1932-1936).

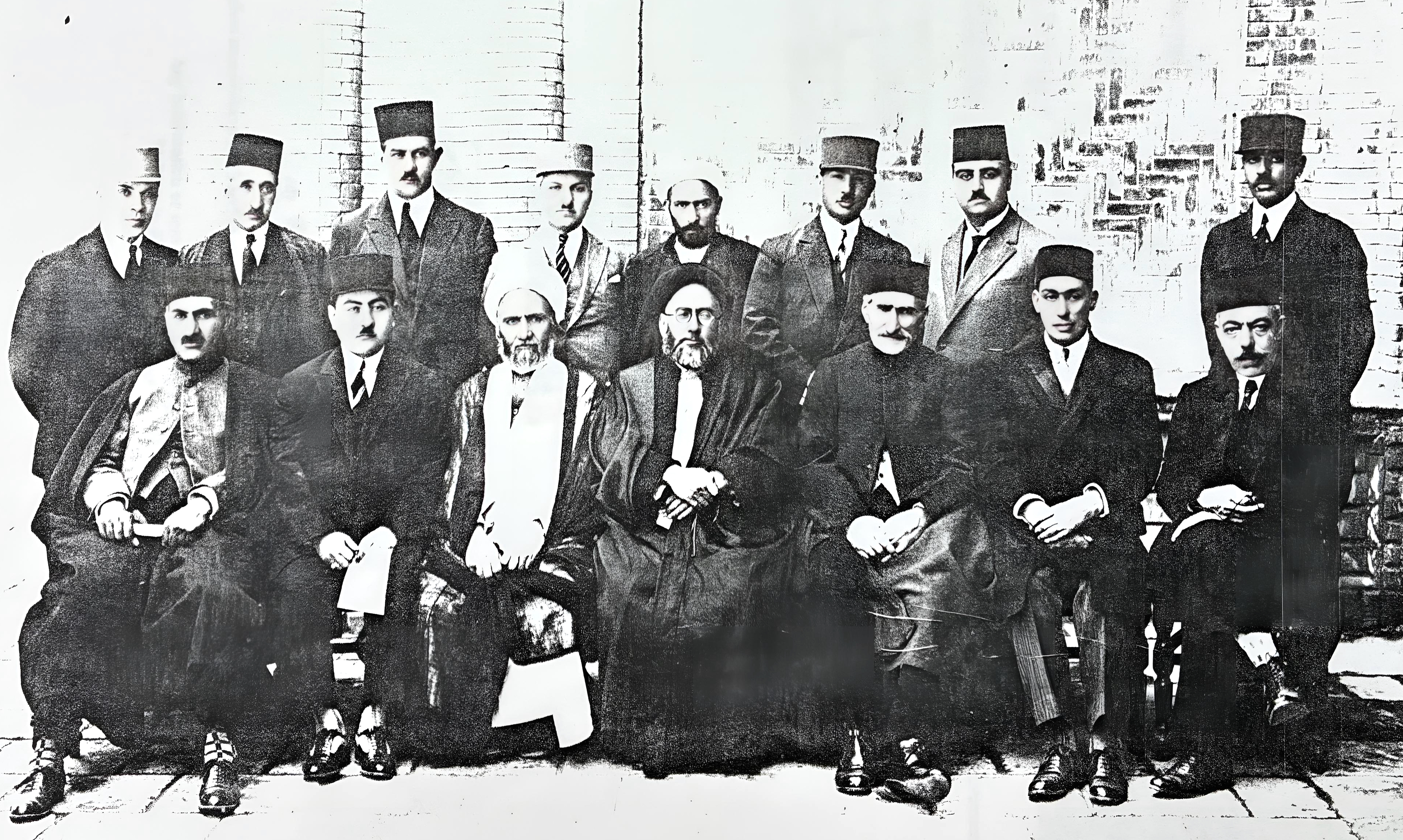
5th Majles 1923. Reza Afshar (back, 3rd from R), Ali Akbar Davar (front, 2nd from L)

Afshar's tenure in Esfahan is noted for substantial industrial expansion—especially in textiles—upgraded health and social services, and infrastructure development, including a plan to divert Kuhrang River to Zayandeh-Rud. This initiative was in conflict with British shipping and commercial interests. To stop its implementation, he was summoned to Tehran, convicted on an alleged petty bribery charge of 350 Tomans backdated to 1932, and barred from public service for life. The leading historian of modern Iran Baqer Aqeli states that accusing Afshar of financial impropriety followed a tactic commonly used in the Pahlavi era for removing political opponents and cites the fate of Mohammad Tadayyon, Abdolhossein Teymourtash, and Firouz Nosrat-ed-Dowleh III as examples.

== Return to Politics ==
In 1944 Prime Minister Mohammad Saʿed reappointed Afshar governor of Esfahan at a time when labor strikes and unrest engineered by the Tudeh Party had crippled the city. He quelled the turmoil but opposition from Gholam-Ali Farivar, a deputy for Tehran and member of the Tudeh-aligned Comrades Party, on the grounds of his 1936 conviction led to his dismissal.

In 1955 Afshar returned to political life as deputy for Tabriz in the 18th Majles and served on the Oil Consortium Committee. On May 5 he called for judicial review of his 1936 conviction and detailed it as politically orchestrated by British interest groups.

== Aviation and Private Enterprise ==
=== Founding of Iranian Airways ===
In December 1944 Afshar was the lead co-founder of the first commercial airline in Iran, Iranian Airways, registered with IATA as "Iran Air," and served as the private company's chairman, CEO, and largest shareholder. Iran Air held its inaugural flight from Tehran to Mashhad on 16 May 1946.

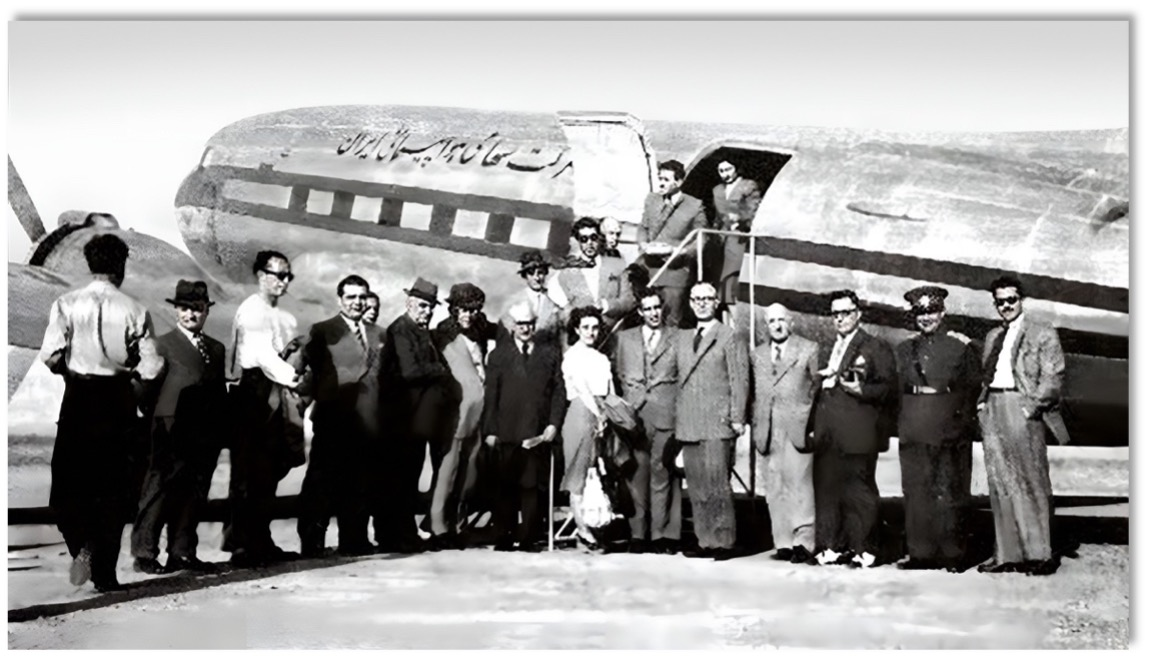
Iran Air inaugural flight, 16 May 1946

The company trained Iranian aviation personnel under contract with TWA and later Transocean Air Lines and rapidly expanded its domestic flights across Iran and international routes to Asia and Europe.

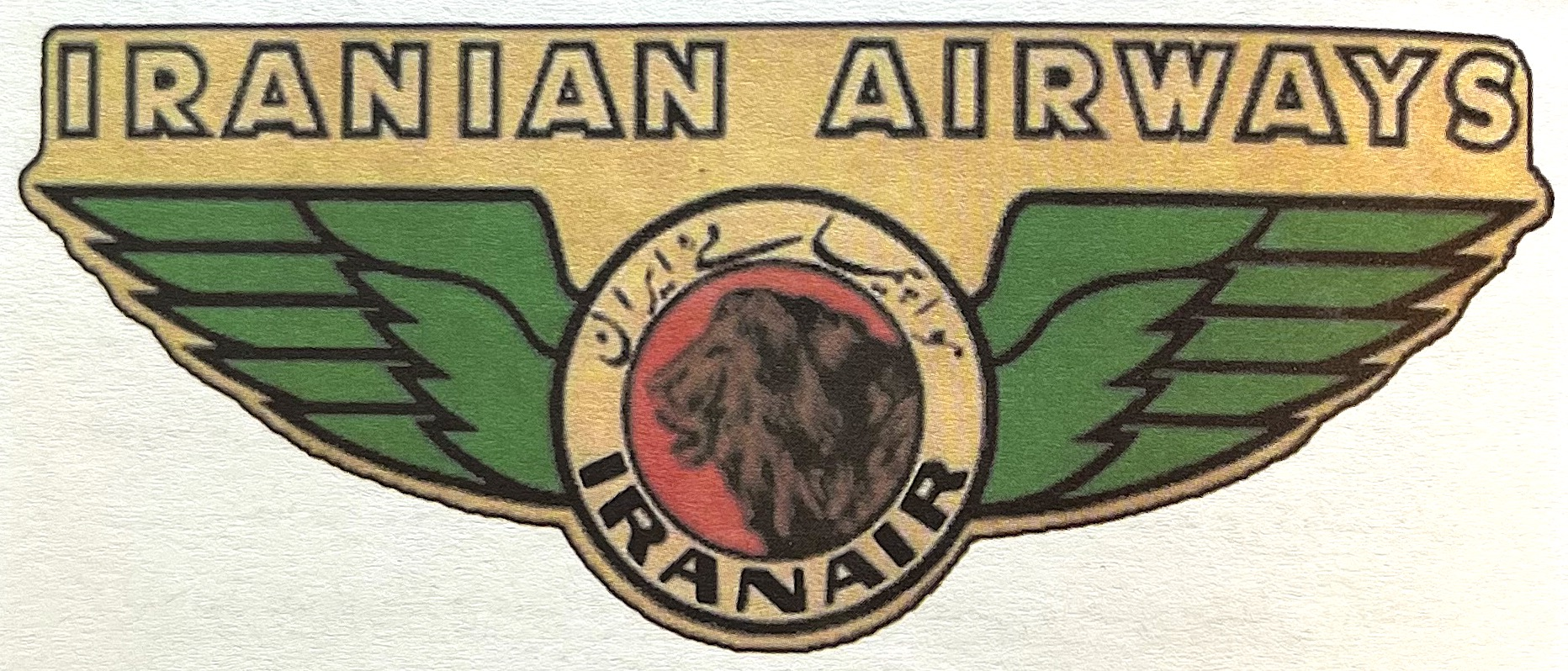
Iranian Airways logo

By the mid-1950s Iranian Airways operated a large fleet of Douglas DC-3, DC-4, DC-6, and Vickers Viscount aircraft, and had negotiated an exclusive contract with V. K. Krishna Menon to fly passengers from India to Jeddah for the annual Hajj pilgrimage.

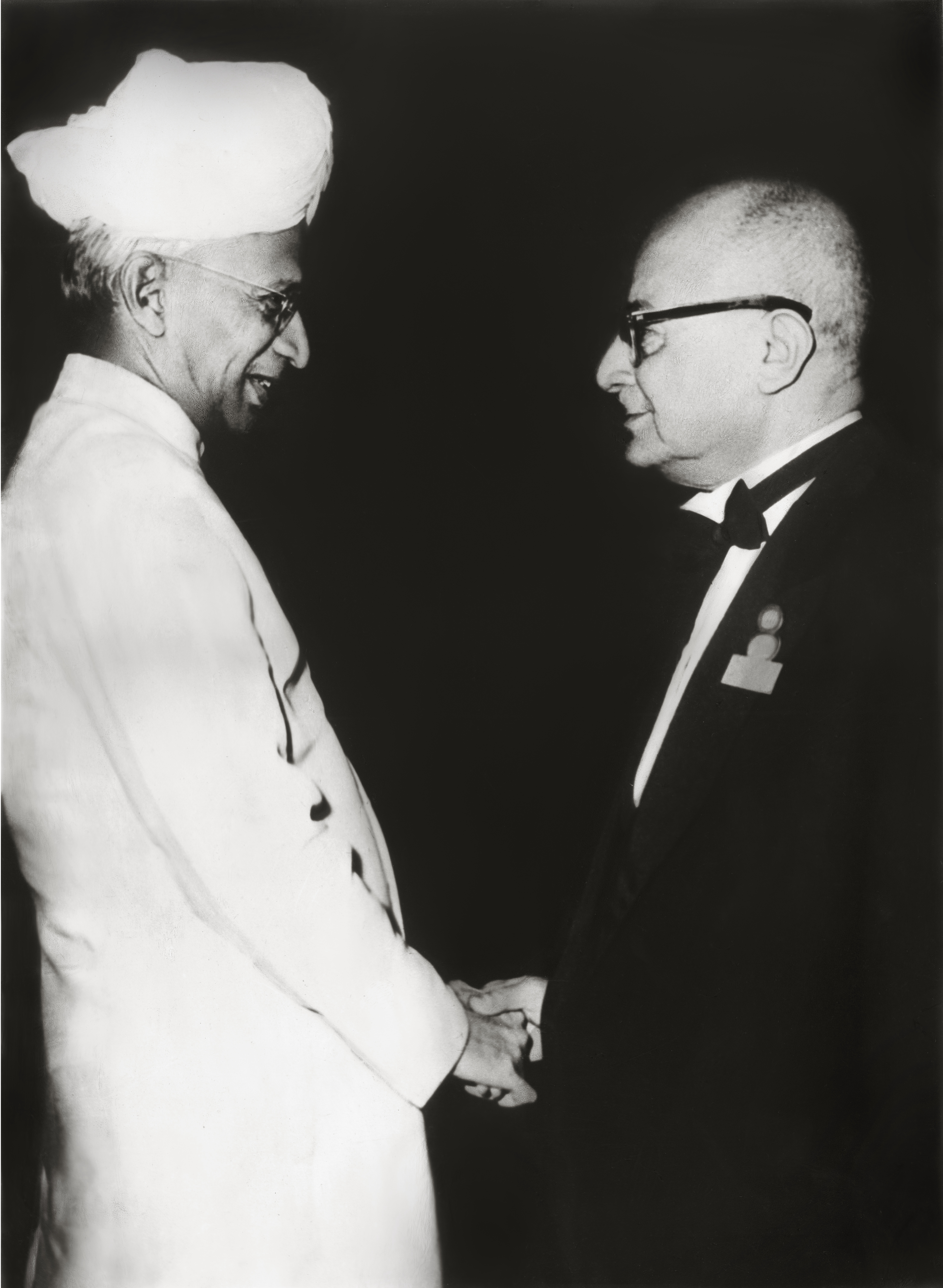
Krishna Menon & Reza Afshar, 1950s

In 1956, fully staffed by Iranians, Iran Air expanded its fleet and moved its operations to the new facilities at Mehrabad Airport.

=== Nationalization ===
In 1962 the government nationalized Iranian Airways and formed the state-owned carrier Homa (Iran Air). The process started in 1960 with a proposal to merge Iran Air with Pars Air, a small company headed by Ahmad Shafiq, the husband of Princess Ashraf Pahlavi. Pars Air flew rental cargo planes and owned no aircraft or aerodrome of its own yet was assigned the majority shareholder in the takeover bid. Afshar rejected the offer out of hand but in time had to submit to nationalization. While BOAC and SABENA jointly apprised Iran Air at $20M, the government arbitrarily reduced the valuation to $3M. The compensation was paid out to the Afshar family over twelve years and against the law, taxed at 50%.

== Personal life ==
Afshar was married to Sariyeh, daughter of Abolqassem Azarbegi, Seraj ol-Mamalek. The couple had five children: Maliheh, Houshang, Soudabeh, Azar, and Kambiz. He had a masterful command of Persian, Arabic, and English and facility with French. An essayist and a poet, he also translated The Comedy of Errors into Persian.

Reza Afshar passed away on 5 February 1964 and was buried in Emamzadeh Abdollah in Ray.
