= Shahid Bahonar University of Kerman =

University in Iran

Coordinates: 30.251653°N 57.106930°E

- دانشگاه شهيد باهنر کرمان; Danushgah-e Shihid-e Bahener Kârman
- Type: Public University
- President: Hossein Akbarifard
- Faculty: 590
- Administrative staff: 600
- Students: ~ 14,000
- Location: Kerman, Kerman Province, Iran
- Campus: 5 square kilometres (1,200 acres); Urban
- Website: uk.ac.ir
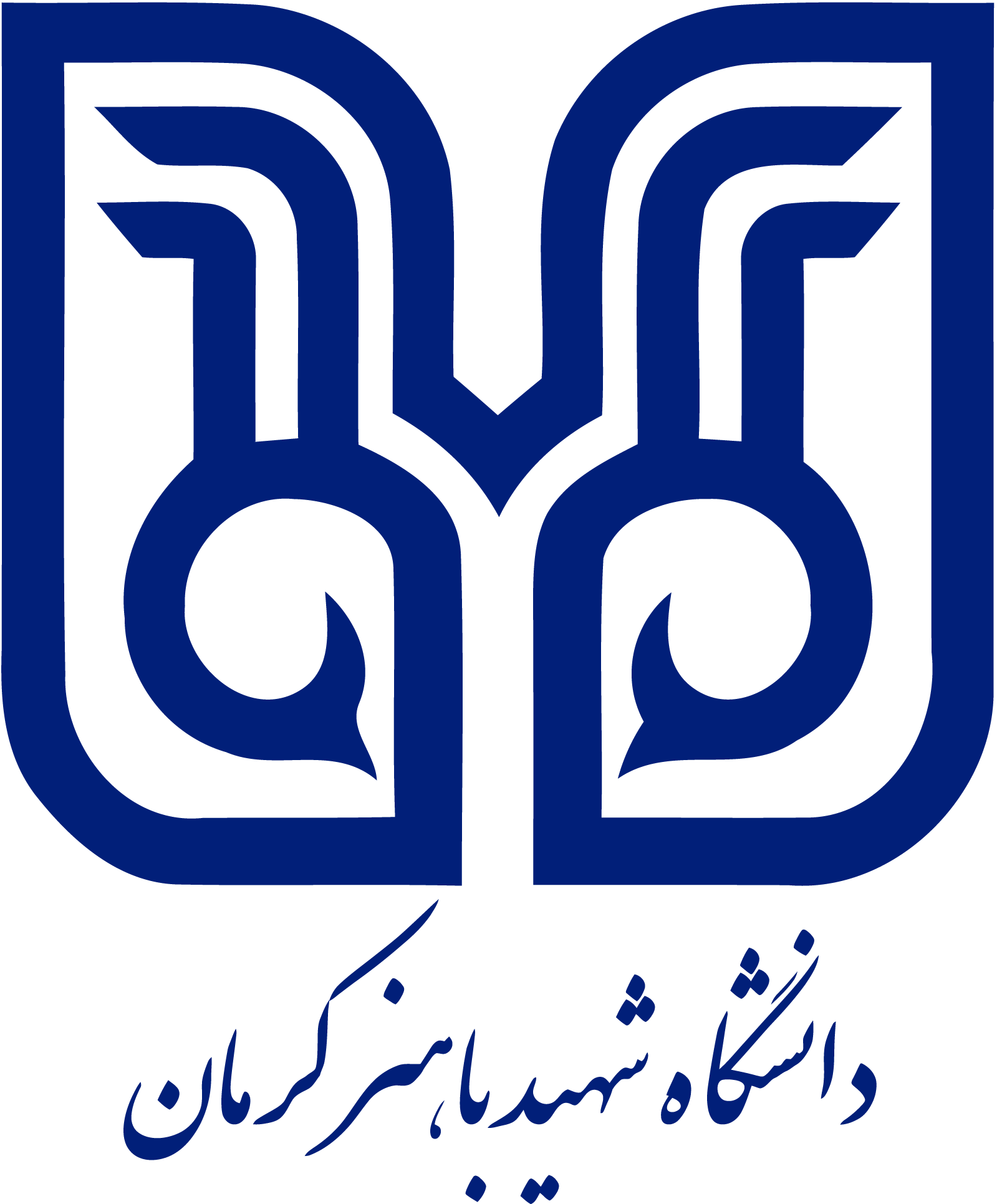

Shahid Bahonar University of Kerman (SBUK) is a research institution and university of engineering and science in Iran, which offers both undergraduate and postgraduate studies. Located in the Kerman province of Iran, the university is among the top ten universities and research institutes in Iran. SBUK occupies an area of 5 square kilometers, making it one of the largest universities in Iran and the region. The university has two major campuses in the city of Kerman and several smaller campuses spread out across the province of Kerman, offering degrees in over 100 different specialties leading to B.A., B.Sc., M.A., M.Sc., D.V.M., or Ph.D. degrees. Although there have been some moves by the smaller campuses in the province to become independent universities, there are still strong ties between these newly established universities and The Shahid Bahonar University of Kerman.

The college of art and architecture, the Saba Faculty of Art and Architecture, was named after Afzalipour's wife. SBUK was appointed as the Center of Excellence (fa:قطب علمی) by Iran's Ministry of Science and Technology (Higher Education) in the field of mathematics.

== History ==
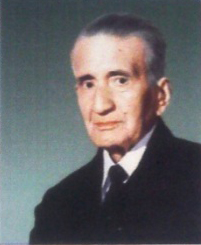
Alireza Afzalipour, the founder

The university was founded by Alireza Afzalipour on August 9, 1972, and inaugurated in 1985. Before the 1979 Islamic Revolution in Iran, this university was called the University of Kerman, and it included the college of medicine. After the revolution, the name was changed to the Shahid Bahonar University of Kerman (SBUK), and the college of medicine was established as an independent university which is now called the Kerman University of Medical Sciences.

=== Founder ===
SBUK was founded by businessman Alireza Afzalipour and his wife Fakhereh Saba. Afzalipour toured several cities in Iran to choose a site for the construction of a university before deciding to build his university in the city of Kerman. The University of Kerman was the first university in the province of Kerman. In 2010, celebrations were held at the Shahid Bahonar University of Kerman to mark his 100th anniversary.

=== Renaming ===
Before the Islamic Revolution of 1979, the university was known as the University of Kerman. The name was later changed to Shahid Bahonar University to honour Mohammad-Javad Bahonar (Persian: محمدجواد باهنر, 5 September 1933 – 30 August 1981). Bahonar was an Iranian scholar, Shiite theologian and politician who served as the Prime Minister of Iran from 15 to 30 August 1981 when he was assassinated by Mujahideen-e Khalq MEK, also known as PMOI and KMO. He is the first Iranian cleric Prime Minister.

=== Academic history ===
In 1980 the Department of Mathematics was awarded the first doctoral degree in mathematics in all of Iran. Moreover, the second and third doctoral candidates in mathematics awarded in the country were also graduates of this department.

== Campuses ==
The university has two major campuses. The Afzalipour Campus is located in the southern part of Kerman City and is considered the main campus. The Afzalipour Campus includes faculty buildings, research centres, the main library, residential halls, the mosque, administrative buildings, and several sports venues. The other main campus is the Campus of Technology and Engineering, located in the western part of Kerman City. The university also has several satellite campuses in the province of Kerman. The Sirjan Campus started accepting graduate-level students in 2012 and planned to make the campus international. There are also plans to open an international campus in the island of Qeshm in the Persian Gulf.

== Academics ==
=== Language of instruction ===
Although the official language of instruction at SBUK is Persian, a large number of lecture materials, reference books, homework assignments, and even exams are in English. This is especially true for postgraduate students, who are encouraged to use English textbooks and materials as their main references.

=== Academic year ===
The academic year is divided into three academic terms, determined by the university. The first academic term usually starts on 23 September. The second academic term usually starts on 11 February, and the summer term usually starts from 10 July.

=== Faculties and colleges ===
Colleges bring together academics and students from a broad range of disciplines, and within each faculty or department within the university, academics from many different colleges can be found.

- College of Engineering
  - Department of Industrial Engineering
  - Department of Mechanical Engineering
  - Department of Civil Engineering
  - Department of Electrical Engineering
  - Department of Computer Engineering
  - Department of Mining Engineering
  - Department of Chemical Engineering
  - Department of Metallurgy Engineering
  - Department of Petroleum Engineering
- College of Management and Economics
  - Department of Management
  - Department of Economics
  - Department of Accounting
- College of Veterinary Medicine
  - Department of Basic Sciences
  - Department of Clinical Studies
  - Department of Food Hygiene & Public Health
  - Department of Pathobiology
- College of Agriculture
  - Department of Irrigation and Water Engineering
  - Department of Food Processing Engineering
  - Department of Biotechnological Engineering
  - Department of Agricultural Machinery
  - Department of Agricultural Economics
  - Department of Soil Engineering
  - Department of Plant Protection
  - Department of Plant Breeding
- College of Art and Architecture
  - Department of Architecture
  - Department of Traditional and Ancient Arts
  - Department of Painting
  - Department of Carpet Studies
  - Department of Restoration of Historic Buildings
- College of Mathematics
  - Department of Mathematics
  - Department of Statistics
  - Department of Computer Sciences
- College of Literature and Social Sciences
  - Department of Foreign Languages
  - Department of Persian Language and Literature
  - Department of Psychology
  - Department of Social Sciences
  - Department of Geography and Urban Planning
  - Department of Islamic Studies
  - Department of Political Sciences and Government
  - Department of History
  - Department of Library Sciences
- College of Physics
- College of Geology
- College of Sciences
  - Department of Biology
  - Department of Chemistry
- College of Sports and Athletics

Satellite Colleges and Campuses

- College of Agriculture in the city of Jiroft
  - Department of Agricultural Machinery
  - Department of Animal Production Technology
  - Department of Plant Production Technology
- College of Technology in the city of Sirjan
  - Department of Civil Engineering
  - Department of Mechanical Engineering
- College of Mining in the city of Zarand
  - Department of Mining

== Research institutes and centers ==
- Research and Technology Institute of Plant Production(RTIPP)
- The Research Center for Mining Industry
- The Research Center for Islamic and Iranian Culture
- The Research Center for Energy and the Environment
- The Mathematical Research Center of Mahani
- The Research Group for Women and Family Issues
- The Research Group for Molecular Biotechnology
- Kashigar Geomechanics Research Center (KGMC)

== Facilities ==
=== Libraries ===
SBUK has one main library and a separate library for each college. The main library of the university is called the Central Library and Documentation Center.

=== Sport venues ===
SBUK has multiple sport venues and maintains a long-standing tradition of student participation in sport and recreation. The main sports complex of the university consists of several basketball, volleyball and tennis courts and a 5000 spectator football stadium.

=== Dormitory ===
There is a large dormitory complex which houses many students, although there some students are housed outside of the university in private dorms.

== Research and innovation ==
SBUK has strong ties with industries - especially those located in the province of Kerman, which has brought many funding and financing opportunities for the university. Since the Shahid Bahonar University of Kerman is a state university, research funds are provided by the Government of Iran. Many ISI journal papers and conference papers are published regularly by faculties, researchers and students of the Shahid Bahonar University of Kerman.

== Endowment and tuition ==
SBUK is a public university and its funding is provided by the government of Iran. For the top ranks of the national university entrance exam, education is free in all state-owned and public universities. Students with ranks below the normal capacity of the universities pay part or all of the tuition.

== Publishing ==
The university's publishing arm, the Shahid Bahonar University of Kerman Press, has published many different academic books and journals.

== Architecture ==
The two major campuses of the university have different styles of architecture. The Afzalipour Campus has a modernist style of architecture inspired by the vernacular architecture of the region.

Afzalipour assigned Bonyan Consulting Company to prepare a campus master plan and design the buildings of the university. A primary goal was to have a flexible design both inside the buildings and in their inter-connections. In each stage of development, the campus was to be a complete and coherent whole, allowing for future expansion without hindering the functioning departments.

The master plan was inspired by the organic urban grid of Kerman city centre that has historically evolved in response to climatic conditions of a desert town. The height of the main building blocks are restricted to 3, optimizing seismological, climatic, economic and circulation considerations. Interconnection of the blocks on the upper stories integrates educational and research spaces, thus enhancing flexibility. These also provide shadow and shelter for open pathways under-passing below. Careful distancing of blocks, along with articulate projections of the buildings, allow natural and controlled lighting for inner spaces while creating ample shadow for the inner courtyards. This general arrangement permits one to cross the whole campus through courtyards and archways with minimal detours, under protection from direct sunlight or rain if needed, or to access other departments from within the buildings and through connecting corridors and internal patios.

== Notable alumni ==
- Eshaq Jahangiri, first vice president of Hassan Rouhani's government
- Majid Namjoo, Iranian Minister of Energy
- Qasem Soleimani, former Sepah Quds Commander
- Mohammad Mehdi Zahedi, former Iranian Minister of Science, Research and Technology
- Omid Tabibzadeh, Iranian linguist

== See also ==
- List of Islamic educational institutions
- Education in Iran
- Higher education in Iran
- Alireza Afzalipour
- Fakhereh Saba
- National Library of Iran
- List of Iranian Research Centers
- List of Iranian scientists from the pre-modern era
- Modern Iranian scientists and engineers
