= Amir-Hossein Aryanpour =

Iranian academic (1925–2001)

- Born: February 27, 1925; Tehran
- Died: July 30, 2001; Tehran
- Occupations: Iranian philosopher, sociologist and literary figure.

Amir-Hossein Aryanpour (February 27, 1925, Tehran – July 30, 2001, Tehran) (Persian: امیرحسین آریان پور) was an Iranian lexicographer, writer, translator, philosopher, sociologist, and literary figure. Aryanpour was an expert in western philosophy and Persian culture.

== Education ==
He studied social sciences at the American University of Beirut, graduating in 1944. He later studied philosophy and social sciences at the University of Tehran and received his doctorate in 1951 in Princeton University. He was one of the students of Badiozzaman Forouzanfar, one of the most prominent figures in the history of Persian literature.

== Career ==
He was a mentor to many, like the Columbia University scholar Hamid Dabashi. Aryanpour was a full professor at University of Tehran. He wrote numerous books and articles on sociology, philosophy and literature. He was influential in the contemporary intellectual movements in Iran. Aryanpour retired from teaching in 1980.

== Death ==
He died in the morning of July 30, 2001 in Asia Hospital, Tehran, at the age of 77.

== Works ==
- Sociology of Art
- Threshold of Doom
- Psychology of Vision realism
- Field of sociology
- Four bilingual dictionary
- Nature, life, origin and evolution of
- Research Approvals
- Two logic: static and dynamic

== See also ==
- Intellectual movements in Iran
- Persian literature
- Iranology
