= Baktash Abtin =

Iranian poet (c. 1974–2022)

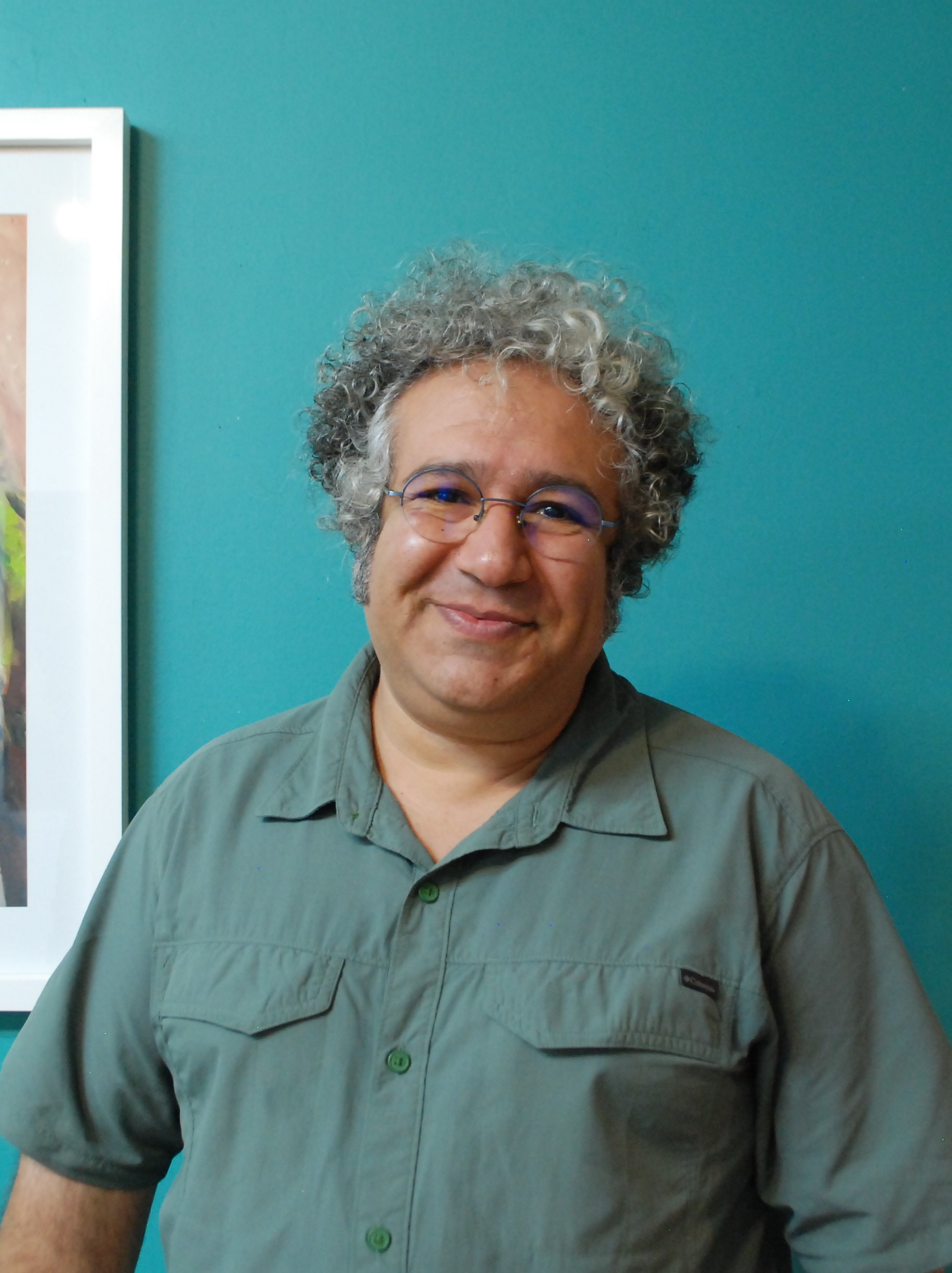
- Born: Mehdi Kazemi; 16 December 1974; Ray, Iran
- Died: 8 January 2022 (aged 47); Tehran, Iran
- Resting place: Imamzadeh Abdollah
- Occupations: Poet, writer, filmmaker
- Organization: Iranian Writers Association
- Notable work: Potk; Mori Wants a Wife; 13 October 1937
- Spouses: Solmaz Mohammadkhani (m. 2004; div. 2006) Maryam Yavari (m. 2009)
- Parent: Assadollah Kazemi (father)

Baktash Abtin (Mehdi Kazemi) (Persian:بکتاش آبتین (مهدی کاظمی); 16 December 1974 – 8 January 2022) was an Iranian poet, writer, and film maker who was imprisoned for 'propaganda against the state' and 'actions against national security'. He had professional associations with the IFFR and was supported by Amnesty International after his imprisonment.

== Life and imprisonment ==
Baktash Abtin published three books of poetry, developing an interest after finishing high school. Following his pursuits in poetry he wrote a script, was in a TV movie, and directed his first film in 2005. Abtin wrote extensively on history, sociology, and literary criticism. Abtin went on to direct at least six additional films (all with dialogue in Persian) up until 2013 including some features touching on more comedic and intimate aspects of Iranian Society. Abtin was arrested at least once before his final detainment after participating in a commemoration for murdered writers on 2 December 2016. After involvement with the publication of a book describing the history of the Iranian Writer's Association, Abtin was charged on 15 May 2019, with "illegal assembly and collusion against national security" and "spreading propaganda against the state". He was sentenced to a total of 6 years imprisonment. Baktash Abtin entered Evin Prison in Tehran on 26 September 2020.

In September 2021, Abtin was honored along with his co-authors Keyvan Bajan and Reza Khandan Mahabadi with the PEN/Barbey Freedom to Write Award.

== Illness and death ==
On 4 April 2021, Abtin was transferred to the prison clinic after showing symptoms of pneumonia likely linked to the internationally prevalent COVID-19 pandemic. During this initial period of illness, Abtin was allegedly denied proper treatment and he was released back to the general population within a week while still unwell. Abtin decided to self-quarantine in the prison's hussainiya to protect fellow inmates from his own probable infection. Abtin was finally granted a medical furlough for treatment by family appointed doctors in October 2021, after never having fully recovered. He was confirmed to be infected with COVID-19 related pneumonia again in December 2021, and was eventually transferred to an intensive care unit at the nearby Taleghani Hospital. After being placed into a medically induced coma on the first day of 2022, Abtin died from his illness on 8 January, at the age of 47. Hadi Ghaemi, director of the New York-based Center for Human Rights in Iran called for accountability over Abtin's death, while tens of thousands of others responded on social media.

The killing of Baktash Abtin was condemned by the Director-General of the UNESCO Audrey Azoulay in a press release published on 1 March. According to global monitoring on the safety of journalists by the Observatory of Killed journalist, Abtin was the 1st media professional killed in the Republic Islamic of Iran 2022.

== Works ==
=== Poems ===
He has three volumes of poetry under his belt, all published in Persian. These include:

- Black means night
- My Heart
- Of the Deep Wounds

=== Filmography ===
- The Solar Eclipse (2005, documentary)
- The Sand Jar (2006, documentary)
- The Sleep Penetration (2007, documentary)
- Mika (2007)
- The Near Dream (2008, documentary)
- Park Mark (2009, documentary),
- October 13, 1937 (2018, documentary)
- Mory Wants a Wife (2013, documentary)
- Fariborz Raisdana (2020)

== Awards and recognition ==
In September 2021, Abtin was honored along with his co-authors Keyvan Bajan and Reza Khandan Mahabadi with the PEN/Barbey Freedom to Write Award.

A documentary film made by Mohammad Rasoulof was aired on televisions including Persian TVs abroad in his memory.
