= Pouran Shariat-Razavi =

Iranian literary and writer (1934–2109)

- پوران شریعت رضوی
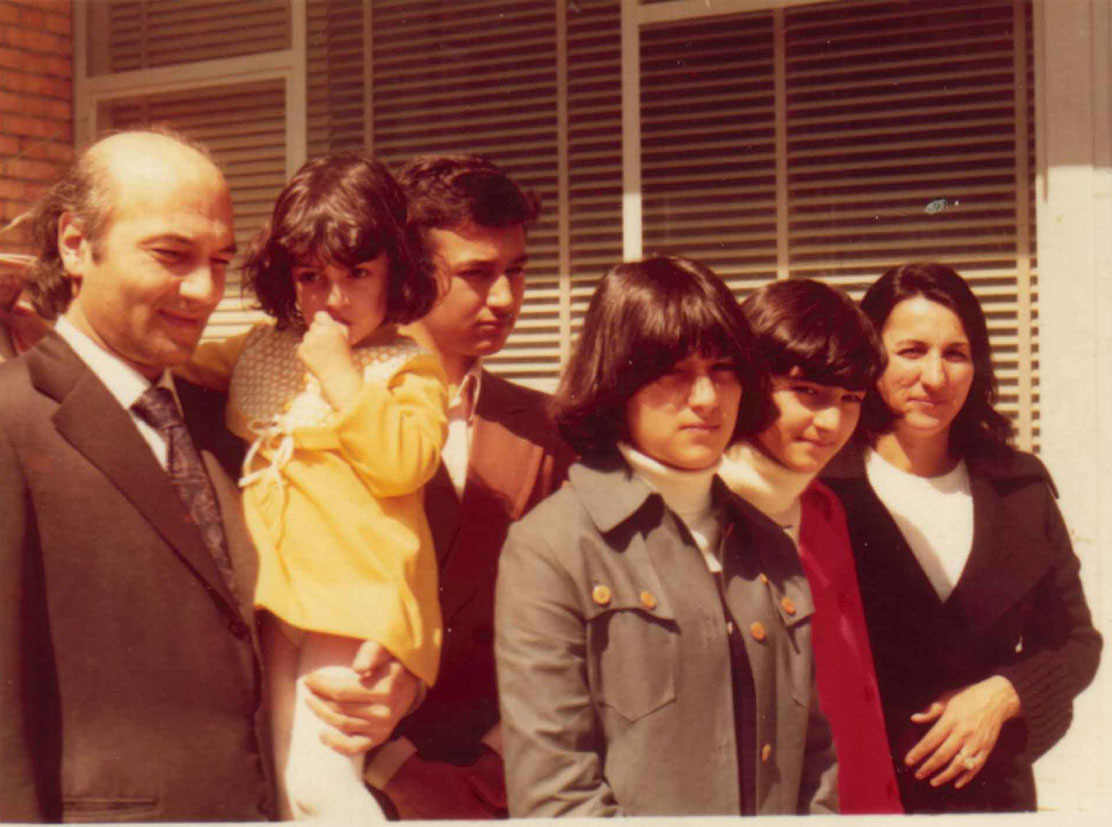
- From right to left: Pouran Shariati, Sara, Sousan, Ehsan, and Mona in Ali Shariati's arms, one day after his release from prison, December 1975.
- Born: November 1934; Mashhad
- Died: 15 February 2019 (aged 84); Tehran
- Education: Sorbonne University
- Occupations: literary and writer
- Spouse: Ali Shariati

Bibi Fatemeh Shariat-Razavi, known as Pouran Shariat-Razavi (Persian: پوران شریعت رضوی), (November 1934 – 15 February 2019) was an Iranian literary researcher and writer. She was the wife of Ali Shariati.

== Early life ==
Pouran was born in Mashhad in November 1934. Her father was a merchant from Khorasan, but the family had moved to Tehran, where the children pursued their education. She had six brothers and one sister.

When she was seven years old, one of her brothers, Ali-Asghar Shariat-Razavi, was killed in Azerbaijan in 1941 while defending Iran's borders against the Soviet army. Another brother, Mehdi Shariat-Razavi, was one of the three students who lost their lives during the security forces' raid on the University of Tehran on 7 December 1953.

In 1955, Pouran entered the Tehran Higher Teachers' Training College, choosing French literature as her field of study. Following the establishment of the Faculty of Literature in Mashhad and despite her personal desire to remain in Tehran, she transferred to Mashhad at her father's insistence after only two months of study in the capital; there, she enrolled in a class attended by Ali Shariati. Shariati proposed to Pouran in 1957; she initially rejected the proposal, as she wished to marry an educated man and intended to complete her university education before marriage. After about a year of persistence and courtship by Ali Shariati, the two were married on July 15, 1958.

== Education ==
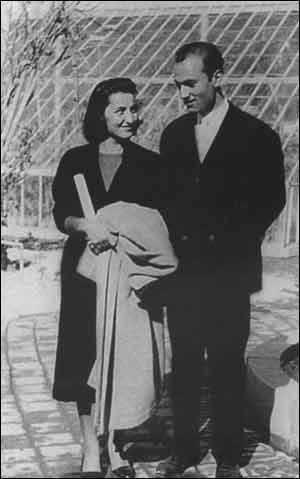
Pouran Shariat-Razavi and Ali Shariati (her husband)

She held a doctorate in Persian literature from the Sorbonne University. Her dissertation, which she defended in 1963 under the supervision of Gilbert Lazard, focused on the representation of nature in Persian lyric poetry of the thirteenth century AD (the seventh century AH).

== Death ==
Pouran Shariat-Razavi, who had been hospitalized for several days following a stroke, passed away on the evening of Friday, 15 February 2019 at the age of 84. Her funeral ceremony was held in front of the Hosseiniyeh Ershad in Tehran; her remains were subsequently transferred to the Imamzadeh Abdollah shrine in Shahr-e Rey and laid to rest beside her brother.

== Work ==
- A Sketch of a Life (Tarhi az Yek Zendegi), Pouran Shariat-Razavi, two volumes, Tehran: Chapkhash Publications, 1997
- Enduring Legacies (Yadegaran-e Mana), Pouran Shariat-Razavi (compiler), Tehran: Zharf Publications, 1997
