= Ahmad Bahar =

Iranian politician

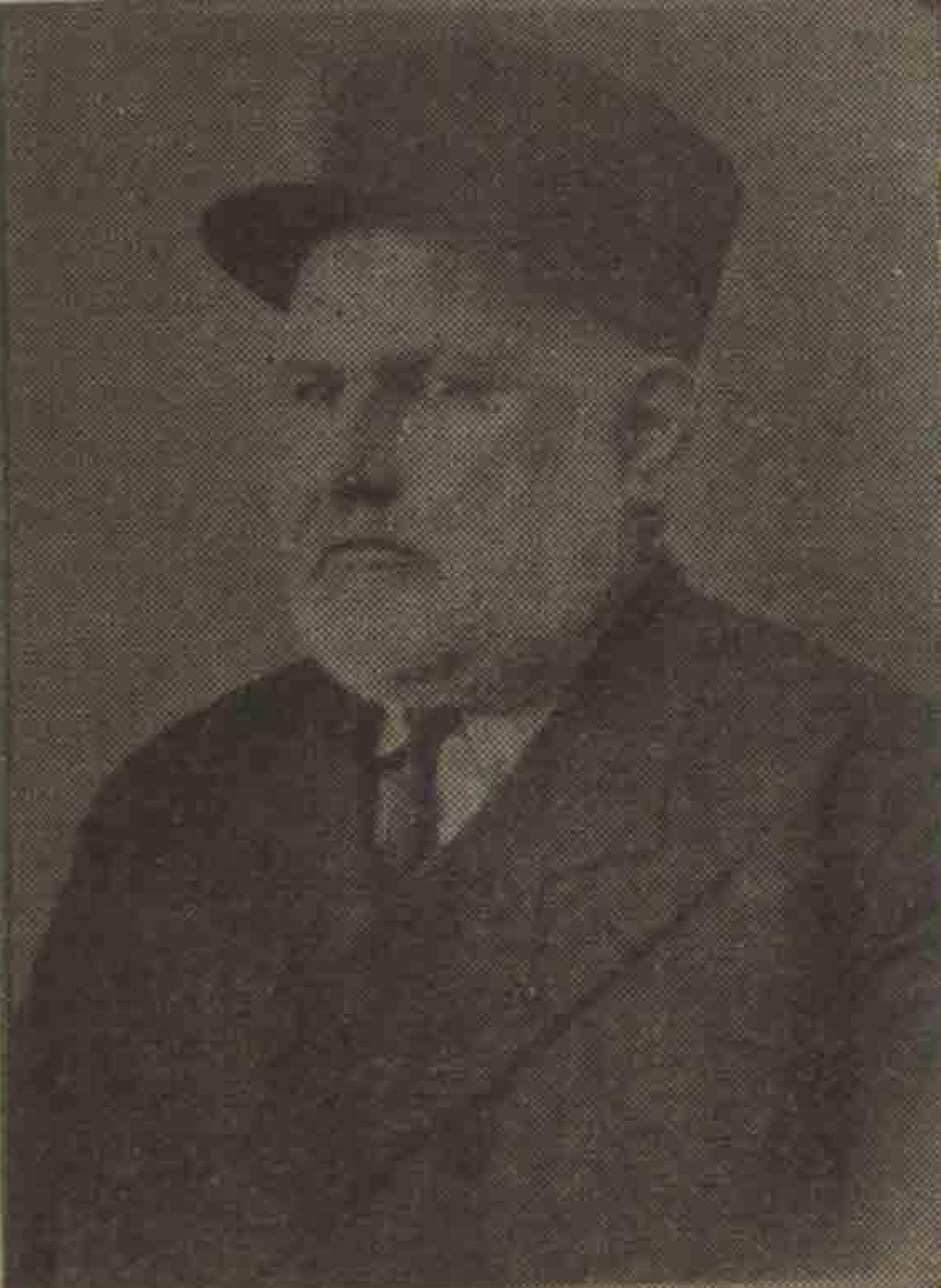
Ahmad Bahar 1934

Ahmad Bahar (1889– 1957) was an Iranian politician, poet, journalist, and farmer.

== Literary career ==
Bahar was a student of Abdoljavad Adib Neishaboori in Mashad in the field of Persian and Arabic literature. He was a journalist and started his own printing and publishing company in Mashad with a Heidelberg press purchased during an eventful trip to Europe. Along with his poet and politician cousin Mohammad-Taghi Bahar (a.k.a. Sabouri), later known as Malek o-sho'ara, Bahar was editor of his cousin's newspaper published in Mashad by his printing company called "Now Bahar" from 1915 to 1917. The printing company remains in existence and produces a daily newspaper "Khorasan".

Bahar is known as one of the masters of patriotic and political poetry utilizing Khorasani Dialect.

== Political career ==
Bahar and his cousin were founder members of the Democratic Party of Khorasan. He was owner and editor of the "Bahar" newspaper that was published in Mashad during first world war and in Tehran during second world war. He was invited by Ahmad Ghavam Ghavomolsaltaneh the Prime Minister to join Government service in 1941 as a Special Secretary to Prime Minister, as well as Press Secretary at the office of Prime Minister.

He continued the job of Special Secretary to Prime Ministers including Mohammed Mossadeq. He was promoted to be Chief of Staff of the Prime Ministerial Office.

He was twice elected as member of parliament Majles from Mashad but on both occasions, the Imperial Court exercised its dictatorial power (i.e. Reza Shah and his son Mohammad Reza Pahlavi) and he was not allowed to serve. On occasion of the popular and religious rise of people of Khorasan in summer of 1935, Bahar was accused of collaboration with organizers of this demonstration in Gowhar Shad Mosque and shrine of Imam Reza in Mashad and jailed for two Years and then exiled from Mashad to Tehran. Nineteen members of the so-called Islamic Revolutionary Council of Iran in 1979 were also prosecuted for having a role in the popular riot of Gowharshad Mosque.

== Personal life ==
Bahar had five sons and two daughters. He was a descendant of Prince Alexander of Georgia.

He died in Tehran in 1957 and was buried in the Ebn-e Babveih graveyard.
