= Mehrdad Bahar =

- مهرداد بهار
- Pronunciation: Mehrdād Bahār
- Born: 1929; Tehran, Iran
- Died: 13 November 1994 (aged 64–65); Tehran, Iran
- Education: PhD
- Occupations: Iranist, linguist, mythologist
- Spouse: Zohreh Sarmad
- Children: 3
- Father: Mohammad-Taqi Bahar

Mehrdad Bahar (Persian: مهرداد بهار, pronunciation: Mehrdād Bahār) (1929, in Tehran – 13 November 1994, in Tehran) was a prominent Iranist, linguist, mythologist and Persian historian.

== Early life ==
Mehrdad Bahar was the youngest son of Persian poet Mohammad Taghi Bahar. He graduated from Tehran University with a Ph.D. in Persian literature and ancient Iranian languages. He received an MA degree in ancient and medieval Persian history from the University of London where he studied with Professor Mary Boyce at the School of Oriental and African Studies. Furthermore, he began his career as a linguist with focus on Middle Persian. Later in his career, he became interested in Persian mythology. He developed theories on ancient roots in Persian culture.

== Works ==
His works on Persian mythology are mainly focused on major non-Aryan/Iranian influences, most of all Mesopotamian mythologies.

Bahar's most notable work is his translation of the well-known Middle Persian text, Bondahesh(n). His other prominent work, A Research on Persian Mythology (two volumes) consists of a collection/compilation of Zoroastrian Middle Persian texts and a systematic analysis of their roots. The second volume, however, was incomplete when Bahar died in 1994. His colleague, Katayun Mazdapour, completed the editing task the following year.

== Bibliography ==
Among his books are:

- Bondahesh ("بندهش")
- Iranian Mythology ("استوره‌شناسی ایران")
- A Research on Persian Mythology ("پژوهشی در استوره‌شناسی ایران")
- Treaties on Persian Culture ("جستاری چند در فرهنگ ایران")
- Notes on Shahnameh ("سخنی چند درباره شاهنامه")
- Persepolis about Persepolis with photographer N. Kasraian

== See also ==
- Persian mythology
- Iranian Studies
