= Five-Masters =

Five-Masters (or Panj Ostād پنج استاد) refers to five influential masters of Persian literature, Badiozzaman Forouzanfar, Malekoshoara Bahar, Jalal Homaei, Abdolazim Gharib and Rashid Yasemi.

These five masters wrote the classic book of Grammar of Persian Language which is now known as Dastoore Zabane Panj Ostad.

Five-Masters are among the most important figures in the history of Persian language and linguistics.

== See also ==
- Persian literature
