= Sadeq Kia =

Iranian historian and linguist

- صادق کیا
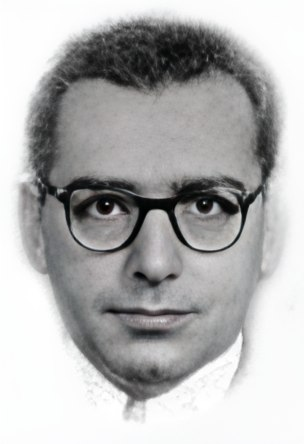
- Born: 15 May 1920; Tehran, Iran
- Died: 1 March 2002 (aged 81); Missoula, Montana, U.S.

Academic background
- Education: University of Tehran (PhD)

Academic work
- Discipline: Linguist
- Sub-discipline: Iranian languages
- Institutions: University of Tehran

Sadeq Kia (Persian: صادق کیا; 15 May 1920 – 1 March 2002) was an Iranian man of letters, distinguished professor of Iranian languages and the president of the second Academy of Persian Language and Literature.

== Biography ==
Sadeq Kia was born in Tehran, Iran, on 15 May 1920 into one of the oldest families of Mazandaran, which traced its roots to the pre-Islamic dynasties that ruled that province. The family produced a number of prominent government officials, intellectuals, and religious leaders during the nineteenth and twentieth century. Kia studied at Adab and Servat schools before attending Dar ul-Funun. After completing his secondary education, he attended the University of Tehran, where he completed his PhD in Linguistics and Philology, with an emphasis on ancient Iranian languages. After completing his Ph.D., he was recruited as a professor of ancient Iranian languages and linguistics at the University of Tehran. During his tenure there, he mentored a significant number of young Iranian scholars, including Mehrdad Bahar and Ahmad Tafazzoli. Kia also founded the Iranvij Society, in collaboration with Zabih Behruz and Mohammad Moghaddam. Behruz had completed his education under the mentorship of Edward G. Browne at Cambridge University and Moghaddam had completed his education at Princeton University. The Iranvij Society published a series of books on Iran's pre-Islamic civilization, culture, and languages. Kia served for many years as the deputy secretary at the Ministry of Culture and Arts. When the second Academy of Iranian Languages was established in 1971, he was selected as its first president and served until the 1979 revolution, when he stepped down. Aside from serving as the president of the academy and teaching at the University of Tehran and other institutions of higher learning, Kia published numerous books and articles. His works on various Iranian languages and dialects spoken both in Iran and beyond, earned him the title of Iran's founding father of Dialectology or the scientific study of linguistic dialect, a subfield of Sociolinguistics.

In 1990, Kia traveled to the United States to visit his two sons. He died in Missoula, Montana on March 1, 2002.

== Works ==
Kia published dozens of monographs and articles on various subjects, including Literature, Lexicology, Dialectology, Folklore, and History. His expertise in Middle Persian led to the publication of several texts. His major scholarly contribution was in the field of lexicology. He collected and edited the Mazandarani language fragments from various historical sources and proposed tentative translations. Kia compiled a glossary for the Gorgani dialect used in the Hurufi scriptures. Kia's contribution to the history of the Hurufi and Nuqtavi denominations as well as the Caspian calendar are rated as essential. A selection of Kia's articles is accessible in the portal of the Institute for Humanities and Cultural Studies.
