= Jahangir Oshidri =

- Born: 1921 (Julian calendar); Kerman - Iran
- Died: On October 22, 2004; Mehr Hospital in Tehran
- Known for: Cleric of the priests of the Zoroastrians in Iran
- Notable work: Light, Fire, Fire temple in Zoroastrianism, Zoroastrianism Encyclopedia, History of Pahlavi and Zoroastrians, Notes by Lord Kay Khosrow, Shahrokh, Horse in Iranian culture, Veterinary history and the results of the 18th International Veterinary Congress

Jahangir Oshidri (Persian: [جهانگیر اوشیدری) (1921 – October 22, 2004) was a high-level Mobad (priest or cleric) and a researcher of the Zoroastrians in Iran. He had studied and researched on the history of the Zoroastrians.

== Biography ==
Jahangir was born in 1921 in Kerman and went to primary and high schools there. In 1939, he entered the Faculty of Veterinary Medicine, University Of Tehran (FVM-UT) to continue his education. After retiring as a brigadier general in the army, he decided to study the Zoroastrian religion. In 1982, he was nominated as the Mobad by the Association of the Zoroastrian Priests. For several periods he was a member of the Zoroastrian Society, and after the death of the mobad, Rostam Shahzadi, he became the head of the Mobadan Association.

== Bibliography ==
Priest Oshidri has published various publications on the history and culture of the Iranian Zoroastrians.

- Light, Fire, Temple of Zoroastrianism
- Mazdayasna (Zoroastrianism) Encyclopedia: A Dictionary of Explanation about Zoroastrian
- History of Pahlavi and Zoroastrians
- Notes by Lord Kay Khosrow, Shahrokh
- The Veterinary History and Results of the 18th International Veterinary Congress (in three volumes)
- Horse in the Iranian Culture
