= Badiozzaman Forouzanfar =

Iranian scholar of Persian literature and culture (1904–1970)

Badi'ozzamān Forūzānfar
- بدیع‌الزمان فروزانفر
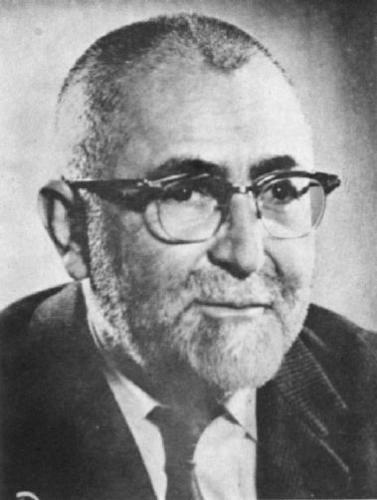
- Badǐ'ozzamān Forǔzānfar
- Born: July 12, 1904; Boshruyeh, Qajar Iran
- Died: May 6, 1970 (aged 65); Tehran, Pahlavi Iran
- Occupation: Scholar
- Known for: Scholar of Persian literature, Iranian linguistics and culture, and an expert on Molana (Rumi) and his works

Badiozzaman Forouzanfar or Badi'ozzamān Forūzānfar (Persian: بدیع‌الزمان فروزانفر, also Romanized as "Badiʿ al-Zamān Furūzānfar"; born 12 July 1904 in Boshrooyeh, Ferdows County – died 6 May 1970 in Tehran, born Ziyaa' Boshrooye-i ضياء بشرويه‌ای) was a scholar of Persian literature, Iranian linguistics and culture, and an expert on Rumi (Molana Jalaleddin Balkhi) and his works. He was a distinguished professor of literature at Tehran University.

He is one of the "Five-Masters (Panj Ostād)", five influential scholars of Persian literature, the others being Malekoshoara Bahar, Jalal Homaei, Abdolazim Gharib and Rashid Yasemi.

The critical edition of Rumi's Diwan-e Shams-e Tabrizi (in 10 volumes) by Forouzanfar is the best edition of the book available to date. The first critical edition of Fihi ma fihi was also done by B. Forouzanfar, which is now well known in the West thanks to the selective translation of A. J. Arberry. His Ahadith-i Mathnawi is a compilation of hadith from Rumi's Masnavi.

He was also a first cousin (maternal) of another famous Iranian scholar of literature, Professor Mohammad Parvin Gonabadi.

== Notable students ==
- Mehrdad Avesta
- Parviz Natel Khanlari
- Zabihollah Safa
- Ehsan Yarshater
- Abdolhossein Zarrinkoub
- Amir Hossein Aryanpour
- Mohammad-Amin Riahi
- Simin Daneshvar
- Mohammad-Reza Shafiei-Kadkani
- Mohammad-Ali Eslami Nodooshan
- Ja'far Shahidi
- Jalal Matini
- William Chittick

== See also ==
- Persian literature
- Rumi (Molana)
- Five-Masters
