= Hanna Al-Fakhoury =

- Born: January 1, 1914; Zahlé
- Died: October 4, 2011 (aged 97)
- Occupations: Philosopher; Writer

Hanna-l-Fakhoury (Arabic: حنا الفاخوري, Ḥānna Al-Faḫūry 1914 – October 4, 2011) was a Lebanese Melkite priest, member of the Missionaries of St. Paul Society, philosopher and linguist. He was born in Zahlé, Lebanon, where his family moved from the village of Majdaloun near Baalbek بعلبك. In 1927 he joined the "Séminaire Sainte-Anne de Jérusalem" (St. Ann's Seminary of Jerusalem) where he completed his basic education in 1936. He was ordained to priesthood in 1943.

He is mostly known for his book 'Tareeḫ Al-Adab Al-Arabi تاريخ الأدب العربي ', History of the Arabic Literature, which was first published in 1951, then revised and re-edited by the author several times. It was so much appreciated that it was translated into several languages including Russian and Persian.
Prof. Fakhoury wrote more than 140 books on Arabic literature, grammar, poetry, lexicography etc. Among them:
تاريخ الأدب العربي (History of the Arabic Literature), منتخبات الأدب العربي (Selection of Arabic Literature ), الأصول الواضحة في الصّرف والنّحو (Clear Rules of Morphology & Syntax), ألجامع في الأدب العربيّ وتاريخه (Compendium of Arabic Literature & its History), المعجم الوافي في علوم النّحو والبيان والقوافي ( Glossary of Syntax, Figures of Speech & Poetry Metre) الخ
