= Ebrahim Pourdavoud =

Iranian Scholar (1885–1968)

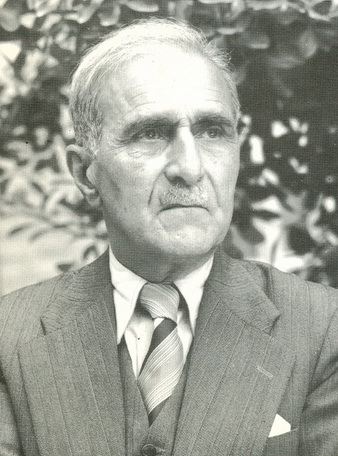
- Born: ابراهیم پورداوود; 9 February 1885; Rasht, Sublime State of Iran
- Died: 17 November 1968 (aged 83); Tehran, Imperial State of Iran
- Resting place: Pourdavoud family mausoleum, Rasht, Iran
- Education: University of Paris
- Occupations: Writer; researcher; translator
- Writing career
- Language: Persian
- Period: Modern

Ebrāhim Pourdāvoud (Persian: ابراهیم پورداوود; 9 February 1885 – 17 November 1968) was an Iranologist and a professor of ancient Iranian culture and the Avestan language at the University of Tehran. Born in Rasht to a mother who was the daughter of a clergyman and a father who was a reputable merchant and landlord, Pourdavoud is considered one of the most formidable scholars of Iran during the 20th century. Renowned for translating the Avesta into Persian in six volumes, Pourdavoud made numerous significant contributions to Iranian studies.

== Life and career ==
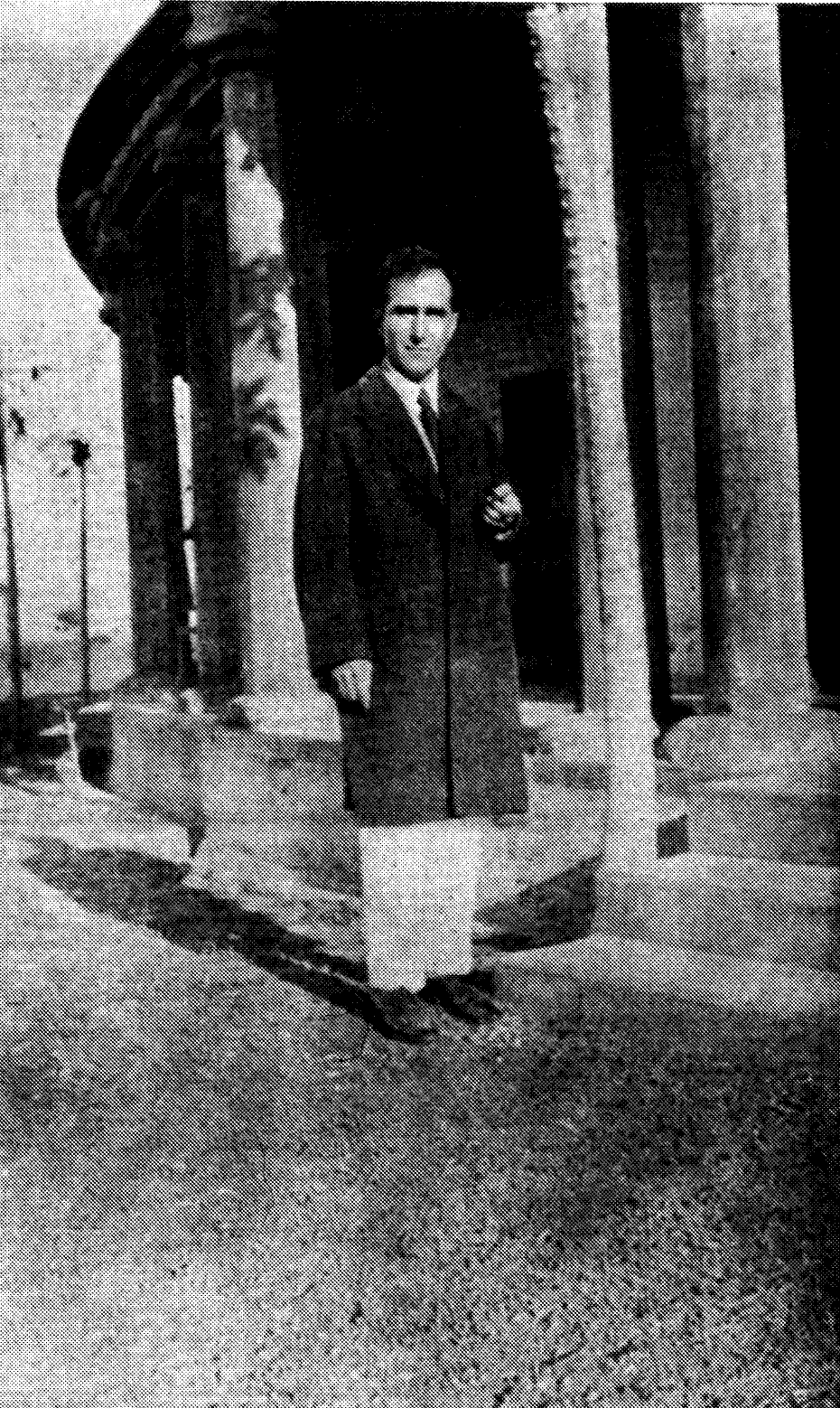
Pourdavoud at Visva-Bharati University in Shantiniketan, 1933.

At the age of 20, Pourdavoud moved to Tehran to pursue studies in traditional medicine. However, he found the field unsuited to his interests and left the program. In 1908, at the age of 23, he relocated to Beirut, where he studied French literature for two and a half years. After a brief return to Iran to visit his family, he departed for France.

In France, he founded the periodical Iranshahr (the Land of Iran). The first issue appeared in April 1914, with the fourth and final issue published in August 1914, coinciding with the outbreak of World War I.

=== Career and Scholarly Work ===
During the First World War, Pourdavoud settled in Baghdad, where he launched another publication titled Rastakhiz (Resurrection). The periodical ran for 25 issues before ceasing publication in March 1916. Following this, he moved to Berlin, where he remained until 1924. His time in Germany marked a turning point in his academic focus, as he developed a deep interest in Zoroastrian teachings and the history of ancient Iran.

Upon his return to Iran in 1924, Pourdavoud founded the School of Ancient Languages, where he conducted extensive research on ancient Iranian history and languages, with a particular emphasis on Avestan. In 1945, he established the Iranology Society and later the School of Iranology, institutions that significantly contributed to the development of Iranian studies in the 20th century.

=== Contributions ===
Pourdavoud's scholarly work encompassed several key areas:

- Translation and interpretation of the Avesta, the sacred texts of Zoroastrianism.
- Research into ancient Persian languages, especially Avestan.
- Analysis of symbols, terminology, and expressions within Zoroastrian texts.
- Studies on the flora, fauna, and ethnography of ancient Iran.
- Investigations into ancient Iranian military history, including weapons and warfare techniques.

In addition to his native Persian, Pourdavoud was proficient in Arabic, English, French, German, and Turkish, as well as ancient Iranian languages.

=== Honors and Recognition ===
Pourdavoud received multiple international honours in recognition of his scholarly achievements. In 1955, he was awarded Germany's highest academic distinction by President Theodor Heuss. He later received the Rabindranath Tagore Medal from India, awarded for outstanding contributions to literature. In 1965, he was honoured with the Order of Saint Sylvester by a representative of Pope Paul VI in Tehran.

=== Personal life ===
Pourdavoud was married to a woman of German descent, and the couple had one daughter, Pourandokht. He died on the morning of 17 November 1968; he was found at his desk in his home study.
