= Fakhereh Saba =

Iranian opera singer

Fakhereh Saba (Persian: فاخره صبا), (1920–2007) was the first female opera singer in Iran.

Saba was born in 1920, the daughter of a cousin of the Iranian musician Abolhasan Saba. She started her primary and musical education in Iran, and continued her higher education in France. She went to France in April 1947 and was accepted as one of the 20 students at the Conservatoire de Paris. A soprano, she performed the part of Suzuki in Giacomo Puccini's Madama Butterfly in the 1960s. She had a lot of notable students including Mansoureh Ghasri, Mohhamad Nouri and many others. Saba and her husband, Alireza Afzalipour, were founders of Shahid Bahonar University of Kerman and Kerman University of Medical Sciences. She died in 2007.

== See also ==
- Music of Iran
