= Manouchehr Sotoudeh =

Manouchehr Sotoudeh منوچهر ستوده
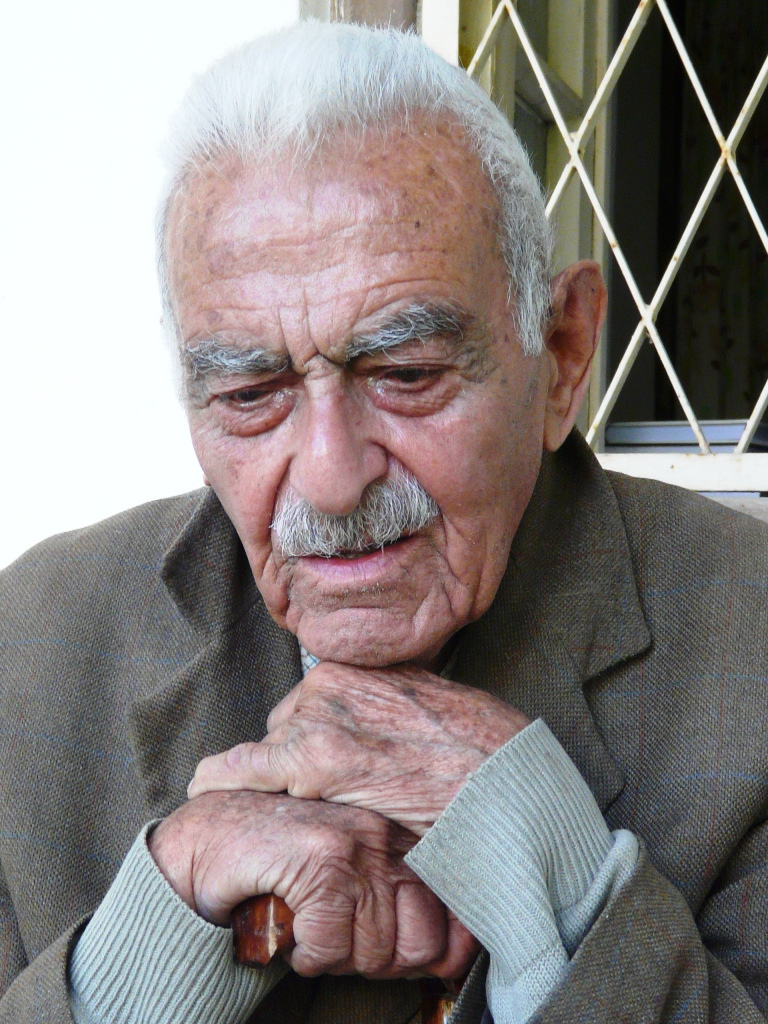
- Manouchehr Sotoudeh
- Born: 19 July 1913; Tehran, Iran
- Died: 8 April 2016 (aged 102); Chalus, Iran
- Occupations: Geographer; scholar
- Website: Official website

Manouchehr Sotoudeh (Persian: منوچهر ستوده, 19 July 1913 – 8 April 2016) was an Iranian geographer and scholar of Persian literature. He was best known for his research on Iranian languages and ethnic groups. Sotudeh earned his Ph.D. from the University of Tehran after studying Persian language and literature.

He wrote 60 books and nearly 300 articles. He was the first Iranian who published the first dialectal dictionary. He was also a professor at the University of Tehran.

From Astara to Astarabad is one of Sotoudeh's most notable works; it explores the history of northern Iran. His other contributions include editing the volumes on the history of Gilan and creating the Gilaki, Semnani, and Kermani dictionaries.

Professor Manouchehr Sotoudeh died at the age of 103 in April 2016.

== See also ==
- Persian literature
- Badiozzaman Forouzanfar
- Five-Masters
