= Gholamreza Rashid-Yasemi =

Iranian academic and author (1895–1951)

- غلامرضا رشید یاسمی
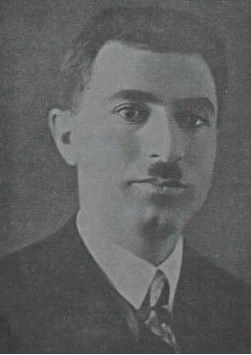
- Born: 1895; Gahvareh, Kermanshah province, Qajar Iran
- Died: 1951 (aged 55–56); Tehran, Pahlavi Iran
- Resting place: Zahir-od-dowleh cemetery
- Occupations: Poet, Journalist, Novelist
- Children: 3, including Siamak Yasemi

Gholamreza Rashid-Yasemi or Gholamreza Rashid-e Yasemi (Persian: غلامرضا رشید یاسمی; born 1895 in Gahwareh, Kermanshah province, Iran – died 1951 in Tehran) was an Iranian-Kurdish poet, translator, academic and literary figure.

He finished his primary education in Kermanshah and then moved to Tehran in 1912 where he resided for the rest of his life. He completed his high school education at the French-language St. Louis School, a Catholic mission school in Tehran. After finishing his education, he became a founding member of the Daneshkadeh Literary Society (انجمن ادبی دانشکده) along with Mohammad-Taqi Bahar, Saeed Nafisi, Abbas Eqbal Ashtiani, and Abdolhossein Teymourtash in 1918. He also published his articles and research essays in Ali Dashti's famed Shafagh-e Sorkh newspaper (شفق سرخ روزنامۀ). He spoke Kurdish, French, English, Arabic and Pahlavi. He had 4 sons, Siamak Yasemi, Shapour Yasami, Bijan Yasami and Siavoush Yasami, and two daughters, Mina Yasami and Yasi Yasami. He died in 1951 after a stroke.

== See also ==
- Five-Masters
