= Alireza Afzalipour =

Engineer, businessman, philanthropist (1909–1993)

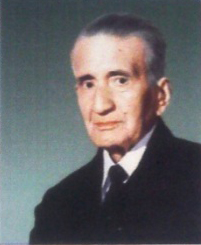
- Born: 26 March 1909; Tafresh
- Died: 7 April 1993 (aged 84)
- Education: Degree in General Chemistry and master's degree in Agricultural Chemistry
- Occupations: Engineering and business
- Known for: founding Shahid Bahonar University of Kerman and philanthropy

Alireza Afzalipour (26 March 1909 – 7 April 1993) (Persian: علیرضا افضلی‌پور) was an Iranian engineer, businessman and philanthropist who is known as the founder of Shahid Bahonar University of Kerman because of his financial support and outstanding donation to Shahid Bahonar University of Kerman as well as Kerman Medical University. He died aged 84 in 1993.

== Education ==
He was born in Tafresh and attended schools in Tehran. Having been granted a scholarship by the Iranian government, he then went to France to study. In 1937, he graduated with a BSc in general chemistry and an MSc in agricultural chemistry. He returned to Iran after finishing his studies in France.

== Career ==
He established his business in electronic products which made him a wealthy man.

== University ==
He planned to build a university and started his research by closely visiting 11 universities in Europe and almost all of universities in Iran. He finally chose Kerman for the location of the university he intended to build. After preliminary studies, about 50 hectares was allocated to the construction on 25 December 1974, and the work began with his 600,000,000-rial donation at the time. The university was officially opened on 15 September 1985. Shahid Bahonar University of Kerman founded by him, is now one of the biggest universities in Iran and the region. The Medical School of the Kerman University of Medical Sciences and a 350-bed hospital in Kerman now bear his name.

== Personal life ==
His wife was Fakhereh Saba, an opera singer and university lecturer, who died on 14 July 2007 at age 82.
