= Kerman University of Medical Sciences =

University in Kerman, Iran

- دانشگاه علوم پزشکی کرمان; Daneshgah-e Olum-e Pezeshki-ye Kerman
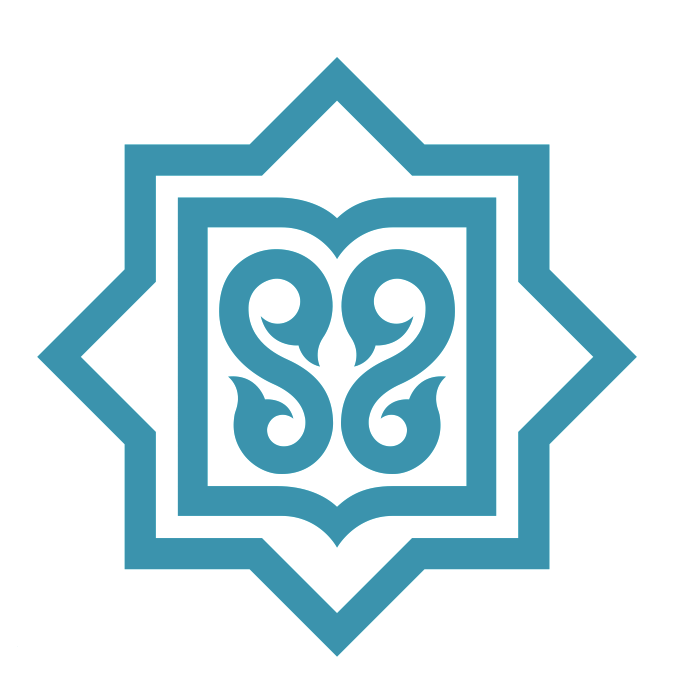
- Type: Public
- Established: 1978
- Location: Kerman, Kerman province, Iran
- Campus: Urban
- Website: www.kmu.ac.ir

Kerman University of Medical Sciences (KMU) is a medical university located in Kerman, Iran.

More than 125 undergraduate and postgraduate program degrees are taught in 10 schools including courses on dentistry, pharmacy, nursing and midwifery, public health, paramedics and allied medicine, Iranian traditional medicine and healthcare management and information. KMU has 6 campuses, including one in Zarand and Sirjan counties each.

Currently, the university enrolls over 5,500 students, with a student gender ratio of approximately 63% female to 37% male. In addition to local admissions, KMU hosts international students, who make up about 3% of the student body. As the largest medical sciences institution in southeast Iran, the university is responsible for healthcare provision, medical education, and research across Kerman Province, operating in affiliation with local teaching hospitals, research centers, and regional health networks.

KMU serves as the primary medical authority in Kerman Province, responsible for the provision of healthcare services, medical education, and the supervision of regional health networks. The university operates through a network of affiliated teaching hospitals and clinical centers, which serve as the primary sites for practical training in medicine, dentistry, nursing, and other health-related disciplines.

== History ==
Kerman University of Medical Sciences traces its origins to 1978 (1356 SH), with the enrollment of its first 50 medical students at the Noriyeh site. Before its establishment as an independent institution, medical education in Kerman was conducted under the umbrella of the University of Kerman (now Shahid Bahonar University of Kerman). The University of Kerman established a faculty of medicine during its early years, which formed the seed of the separate medical sciences university.

The scope of medical education expanded in the following years, with the admission of nursing and medical education students. In 1984, the Faculty of Health was established to broaden the university's academic offerings. Following the post-revolution reorganization of higher education in Iran, which mandated the separation of medical schools from comprehensive universities, Kerman University of Medical Sciences was officially established as an independent institution in 1986. The university integrated the medical and paramedical departments previously affiliated with Shahid Bahonar University with the provincial health administration.

The university's development was significantly influenced by the philanthropist Alireza Afzalipour, whose foundational support and vision were instrumental in establishing the institution as a leading medical hub in southeastern Iran. Today, the university's main medical campus and its primary teaching hospital are named in his honour.

== Colleges and schools ==
Kerman University of Medical Sciences teaches across 10 schools, including medicine, dentistry, pharmacy, nursing and midwifery, health, traditional Persian medicine, allied medical sciences, medical management and informatics, and health technology and rehabilitation. The university also operates satellite campuses in Zarand and Sirjan.

- School of Medicine
- School of Dentistry
- School of Pharmacy
- School of Health
- School of Allied Medical Sciences
- School of Nursing and Midwifery
- School of Traditional Persian Medicine
- School of Medical Management and Informatics
- School of Health Technology and Rehabilitation
- Satellite campuses in Zarand and Sirjan

== Research ==
Kerman University of Medical Sciences conducts extensive biomedical and clinical research through its network of multidisciplinary research institutes and specialized research centers. The university's research strategy aims to integrate theoretical knowledge with practical health solutions.

=== Research institutes ===
The university coordinates its major research programs through the following institutes:

- Institute of Futures Studies in Health – Oversees several centers dedicated to health policy and modeling:
  - Center for Future Studies and Innovation
  - Health Modeling Research Center
  - Health Services Management Research Center
  - Social Determinants of Health Research Center
  - Medical Informatics Research Center
  - HIV/STI Surveillance Research Center

- Institute of Neuropharmacology – Focused on neuroscience and pharmaceutical sciences:
  - Neuroscience Research Center
  - Physiology Research Center
  - Pharmaceutics Research Center
  - Neurological Diseases Research Center
- Institute of Oral and Dental Diseases – Coordinates research in dental health and related pathologies:
  - Oral and Dental Diseases Research Center
  - Endodontology Research Center
  - Social Determinants of Oral Health Research Center

=== Specialized research centers ===
The university also operates the following independent research centers:

- Cardiovascular Research Center
- Environmental Health Engineering Research Center
- Gastrointestinal and Hepatology Research Center
- Health in Disasters and Emergencies Research Center
- Herbal and Traditional Medicines Research Center
- Hydatid Disease Research Center
- Leishmaniasis Research Center
- Medical Mycology and Bacteriology Research Center
- Nursing Research Center
- Pathology and Stem Cells Research Center
- Pharmaceutical Sciences and Cosmetic Products Research Center
- Tropical and Infectious Diseases Research Center

== WHO Collaborating Centres ==
The university hosts a World Health Organization (WHO) collaborating centre:

- WHO Collaborating Centre for HIV Surveillance and Research (hosted at the Regional Knowledge Hub and HIV/STI Surveillance Research Center). It serves as a regional technical and research hub providing capacity building, surveillance protocols, and research support for HIV/AIDS and sexually transmitted infections across the Eastern Mediterranean Region.

== Teaching hospitals ==
Kerman University of Medical Sciences operates several specialized and sub-specialized teaching and referral hospitals in Kerman, providing healthcare services to southeast Iran as well as clinical education for medical students and residents:

=== Afzalipour Hospital ===
Afzalipour Hospital (Persian: بیمارستان افضلی‌پور) is the largest general and tertiary referral teaching hospital in Kerman. Endowed and constructed through the philanthropy of Alireza Afzalipour and Fakhereh Saba, the medical complex features over 450 active inpatient beds. It hosts specialized departments including internal medicine, surgery, obstetrics and gynecology, pediatrics, oncology, nephrology, and neonatal intensive care units.

=== Shafa Hospital ===
Shafa Hospital (Persian: بیمارستان شفا) is a major university-affiliated specialized teaching center with around 400 active beds. The hospital serves as a key regional center for cardiovascular surgery, cardiology, neurology, neurosurgery, orthopedics, urology, and emergency medicine, equipped with advanced diagnostic and intensive care facilities.

=== Shahid Bahonar Hospital ===
Shahid Bahonar Hospital (Persian: بیمارستان شهید باهنر) is the primary level-1 trauma and emergency referral hospital in the southeast region of Iran. It features specialized centers for trauma care, emergency medicine, orthopedics, neurosurgery, maxillofacial surgery, and reconstructive surgery, alongside comprehensive rehabilitation and burn care services.

=== Shahid Beheshti Hospital (Kerman) ===
Shahid Beheshti Hospital (Persian: بیمارستان شهید بهشتی کرمان) is the specialized university hospital dedicated to psychiatry, mental health services, neurology, and clinical psychology in the Kerman province.

== Rankings ==
Kerman University of Medical Sciences is evaluated across major international and regional ranking systems, reflecting its research performance and academic impact:

=== Global and regional rankings ===
Ranking agency	Edition / Year	World rank	Regional rank
Times Higher Education (THE)	2026	801–1000	—
Times Higher Education (Asia University Rankings)	2026	—	301–350
QS University Rankings (Asia)	2026	—	593
SCImago Institutions Rankings	2026	6940	—
THE Impact Rankings	2025	401–600	—
U.S. News & World Report	2026	1163	—
Webometrics	2026	2419	
ISC World University Rankings	2025	1401–1600	—

=== Subject and indicator rankings ===
Ranking agency	Subject / Indicator	Edition / Year	Rank
Times Higher Education (Subject)	Clinical and Health	2026	501–600
Times Higher Education (Subject)	Education	2026	800+
Global Ranking of Academic Subjects (GRAS)	Public Health	2026	201–300
CWTS Leiden Ranking	Open Access	2026	1248
CWTS Leiden Ranking	Collaboration	2026	1248
CWTS Leiden Ranking	Scientific Impact	2026	1195
CWTS Leiden Ranking	Gender Diversity	2026	994

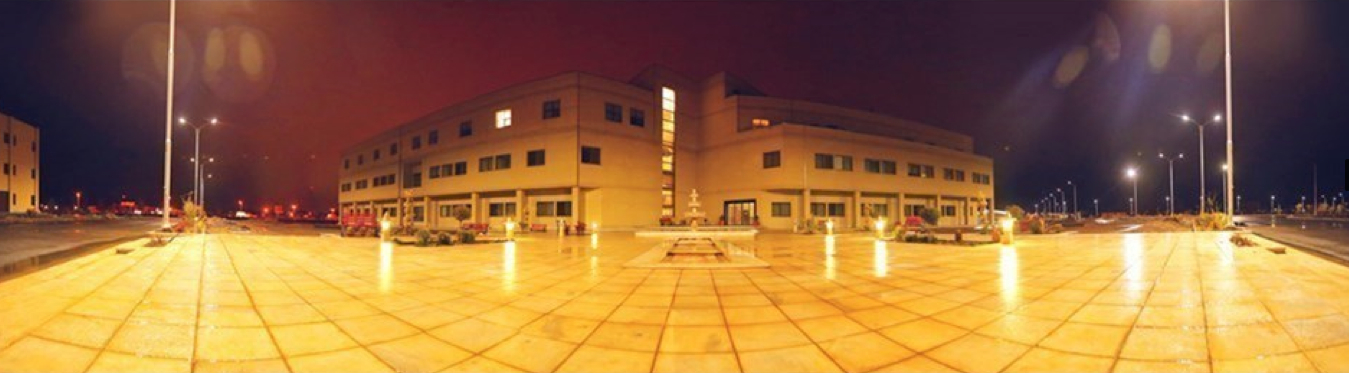
KMU main office inaugurated in 2016
