= Reza Rasouli =

Iranian politician (1898-?)

Trade and Economy Minister of Azerbaijan's Government
- In office 1945–1946

Personal details
- Born: 1898 (age 127–128) Tabriz, Iran
- Party: Azerbaijani Democratic Party

Reza Rasouli (Azerbaijani: Rza Rəsuli, Persian: رضا رسولي ; born 1898 in Tabriz — death ?) was an Iranian Azerbaijani politician. By Ja'far Pishevari with the formation Azerbaijan People's Government in 1945, was Trade and Economy Minister of Azerbaijan's Government in the Ja'far Pishevari Cabinet. Before the establishment of government he was employee in the Ministry of Interior (Pahlavi dynasty).
