= Abdullah Khan Ahmadieh =

- Born: September 12, 1886; Amol
- Died: July 14, 1959 (aged 72); Tehran
- Citizenship: Iran
- Education: Dar ul-Funun (Persia) (MD)
- Known for: Revival of traditional Iranian clinical medicine
- Children: 5
- Scientific career
- Fields: Parasitology
- Workplaces: Dar ul-Funun (Persia); Karachi Medical Association; Quarantine of Pahlavi port Ahmadiyeh Hospital; Teacher of Pharmacy school and Natural history

Abdullah Khan Ahmadieh (12 September 1886 – 25 July 1959) was a doctor, translator, physician, army major, university professor and philanthropist.

== Biography ==
After his preliminary studies in Amol, Abdullah Ahmadieh came to Tehran and studied medicine at Dar al-Funun School. The time of Abdullah's studies at Dar al-Funun coincided with the presence of French professors there. Ahmadieh went to Europe for some time to study and then returned to Iran. He played a major role in the revival of Traditional Iranian Medicine in modern times. Ahmadieh died on 25 July 1959 and was buried at the Imamzadeh Abdullah shrine. Abbas Adham was one of his professors in Iran. Ahmadieh did not receive visit money from most of its clients. Receiving certificates of appreciation from the medical and cultural societies of the United States of America, the Soviet Union, and Pakistan due to valuable research in the field of ancient medicine are one of the honors of this professor in the field of medicine.
