= Mohammad-Taqi Bahar =

Iranian poet and scholar (1886–1951)

Mohammad-Taqi Bahar محمدتقی بهار
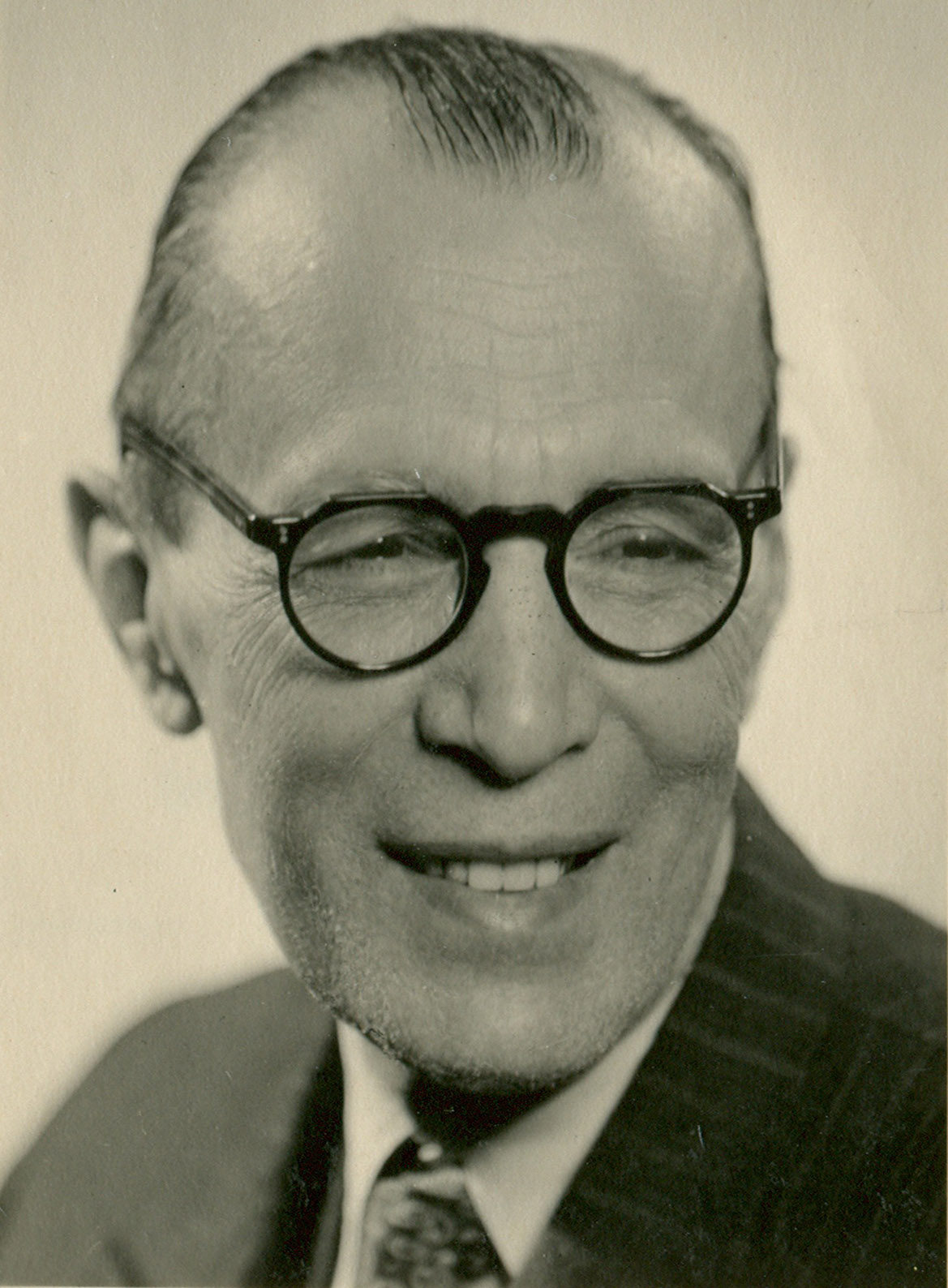
- Born: 10 December 1886; Mashhad, Sublime State of Iran
- Died: 22 April 1951 (aged 64); Tehran, Imperial State of Iran
- Occupations: Poet, politician and journalist
- Spouse: Sodabeh Safdari (m. 1919)
- Children: 6, including Mehrdad
- Parent: Mohammad Kazem Sabouri
- Writing career
- Notable works: Tārikh-e Sistān Tārikh-e Mokh'tasar-e Ahzāb-e Siāssi; Sabk Shenāsi; Moj'malal ol-Tavārikh val Qesās Javāme' ol-Hekāyāt (Anthology of Stories),
- Movement: Persian literature
- Website: bahar-site.fr

Mohammad-Taqi Bahar (Persian: محمدتقی بهار; also romanised as Mohammad-Taqī Bahār; 10 December 1886 in Mashhad – 22 April 1951 in Tehran), widely known as Malek osh-Sho'arā (Persian: ملک‌الشعراء) and Malek osh-Sho'arā Bahār ("poet laureate," literally: the king of poets), was a renowned Iranian poet, scholar, politician, journalist, historian and Professor of Literature. Although he was a 20th-century poet, his poems are fairly traditional and strongly nationalistic in character. Bahar was father of prominent Iranist, linguist, mythologist and Persian historian Mehrdad Bahar.

== Biography ==
Mohammad-Taqí Bahār was born on 10 December 1886 in the Sarshoor District of Mashhad, the capital city of Khorasan province in north-eastern Iran. His father was Mohammad Kazem Sabouri, the Poet Laureate of the shrine in Mashhad who held the honorific title of Malek o-Sho'arā ("King of Poets"), while his mother was a devout woman named Hajjiyeh Sakineh Khanum. Bahār was of Georgian descent on his maternal side. His mother's forebears were Georgian notables who had been captured by the troops of Abbas Mirza during the Russo-Iranian Wars and were taken to mainland Iran, where they eventually converted to Islam. Bahār's paternal great-great-grandfather was Hajj Mohammad-Baqer Kashani, who in turn was the son of Hajj Abd ol-Qader Kharabaf of Kashan.

Bahār began his primary education when he was three, with his father, Mohammad Kāzem Sabouri, as his tutor. In addition to his private schooling, Bahār attended one of the traditional schools, Maktab Khāneh, in Mashhad. To enhance his knowledge of Persian and Arabic, he further attended the classes of Adib Nai'shābouri, a traditional poet and literary scholar who promoted the style of the poets of Khorasan in the early Islamic era, in the tradition of the so-called bāzgasht-e adabī (literary return). It has been said that Bahār knew by heart a very good portion of the Quran at a very early age. According to Bahār himself, at seven he read Shahnameh and fully grasped the meaning of Ferdowsi's Epic poems.

Bahār composed his first poem at age eight, at which time he also chose the name Bahār, meaning Spring, as his pen name (takhallos in Persian). It is known that Bahār chose this pen name after Bahār Shirvāni, a poet and close friend of his father's, after Shirvāni's death. Shirvāni was a renowned poet during Naser al-Din Shah Qajar.

At 14, Bahār was fluent in Arabic, and later he achieved spoken and written fluency in French. At 18, he lost his father and started to work as a Muslim preacher and clergy. It was during this time that he composed a long ode (Qasideh in Persian) and sent it to Mozaffar ad-Din Shah Qajar who became so deeply impressed by this ode that he immediately appointed Bahār as his Poet Laureate and by Royal Decree conferred on him, at the age of 19 (1903), the title of Malek o-Sho'arā at the shrine of Imam Reza in Mashad.

At the onset of the Constitutional Revolution of Iran (1906–1911), Bahār laid down his position of Poet Laureateship and joined the revolutionary movement for establishing the parliamentary system of democracy in Iran. Bahār became an active member of the Mashhad branch of Anjoman-e Sa'ādat (Society for Prosperity) that campaigned for establishment of Parliament of Iran (Majles). He published the semi-covert newspaper Khorāsān, in collaboration with Hossein Ardebili, Nou-bahār (New Spring), and Tāzeh-bahār (Fresh Spring), both in collaboration with his cousin Haj Sheikh Ahmad Bahar who operated a printing company and who acted as the Senior Editor first in Mashhad and later in Tehran.

Bahār published numerous articles in his newspapers in which he passionately exhorted his readers to stand up and help bring about the establishment of a functioning Parliament. He equally forcefully advocated the creation of new and reformed public institutions, a new social and political order and of new forms of expression. After the triumph of the Constitutional Revolution, Bahār was repeatedly elected as a Member of Parliament.

In 1918, when Ahmad Shah Qajar, the seventh and the last shah of the Qajar dynasty, was in power, Bahār reinvented himself: he ceased all his clerical activities and became an entirely new man. At the same time, he together with the writer and poet Saeed Nafisi, the poet and historian Gholam-Reza Rashid Yasemi the historian Abbas Eqbāl Ashtiāni, and his talented friend Abdolhossein Teymourtash founded The Literary Association of the academy (Anjoman-e Adabi-ye Dāneshkadeh). The Magazine of the academy (Majaleh-ye Dāneshkadeh) was the monthly publication of this Association, in which, in addition to works of prose and poetry, other very informative and useful articles were published, under such diverse titles as "Literary Revolution", "How other nations view us" and "The Literary History of Iran". In fact, this magazine became Bahār's vehicle for publication of the results of his literary researches and introduction of Western Literature to Iranians. The magazine also played a key role in developing and strengthening the present-day form of Persian Literature.

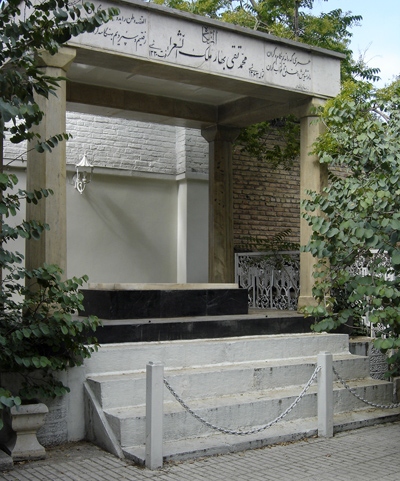
Bahār's tomb in Zahir-od-dowleh cemetery, Tehran

In Winter 1933 Reza Shah ordered his police to arrest and drag him in the snow. As told by his daughter Parvaneh one year his family did not know his whereabouts or even if he was alive. After a year the family was allowed to visit him in prison. However soon thereafter Reza Shah exiled Bahar along with his family to Isfahan for two years according to his daughter Parvaneh.

Following establishment of Tehran University in 1934 (during the reign of Reza Shah Pahlavi), and 3 years of imprisonment and exile Bahār became Professor of Persian Literature at the Faculty of Literature of this university. In the course of his tenure as Professor, he dedicated most of his time to writing and editing books on Persian Literature and History. Notable amongst numerous works written and edited by Bahār are:

- Tārikh-e Sistān (History of Sistān),
- Tārikh-e Mokh'tasar-e Ahzāb-e Siāssi (A Concise History of the Political Parties),
- Sabk Shenāsi (Methodology), which concerns the variety of styles and traditions of Persian prose,
- Moj'malal ol-Tavārikh o val Qesās (Concise Histories and Tales),
- Javāme' ol-Hekāyāt (Anthology of Stories),
- Two volumes of verse, consisting of his own poems.

In 1945, during Mohammad Reza Shah Pahlavi's reign, Bahār served for a short period as the Minister of Culture and Education in the Cabinet of the then Prime Minister Ahmad Qavam (also known as Qavam os-Saltaneh). Earlier in the same year he and Ahmad Qavam had created the Tiran Democratic Party (Hezb-e Demokrāt-e Tirān).

In the last years of his life, Bahār suffered from Tuberculosis. He sought medical treatment in Leysin, Switzerland, in a sanatorium, where he stayed between 1947 and 1949. It was not long after his return to Iran that his health quickly deteriorated. He died on 21 April 1951, at his home in Tehran. He is entombed in Zahir-od-dowleh cemetery in Darband, located in Shemiran, northern Tehran.

== Poetry ==
Although Bahār was a 20th-century poet, his poems are quite traditional and decidedly patriotic. Many scholars have strongly emphasised and documented that Bahār's style of writing and the beauty of his poetry, in addition to his deep passion for Iran and his persistent opposition to fanaticism, have indeed made him one of the greatest cultural icons of modern Iran. Although he worked for some period of time as a clergyman and preacher, his first and foremost passion had always been writing, especially of poetry, as well as carrying out historical researches and teaching.

Through his literary magazine, The Magazine of the academy (Majaleh-ye Dāneshkadeh), Bahār had a significant impact on the development of modern Persian poetry and literature. One may argue that, to varying degrees, almost all the early advocates of modernism in Persian Poetry and Literature found their inspirations in the new developments and changes that had taken place in Western literature. Nonetheless, such inspirations would not have easily resulted in changes without the efforts and support of such figures as Bahār, whose literary contributions were, and remain consonant with Iranian culture. In Bahār's collection of poems, one finds poems composed in almost every tradition of Persian Poetry. To name a few, he wrote Panegyric (Setāyeshi or Madiheh), Epic (Hamāsi), Patriotic (Mihaní), Heraldic and Mystic (Ramzi or Sufi'āneh), Romantic (Āasheghāneh), Ethical (Akhlāghi), Didactic (Āmuzeshi or Pandi), Colloquial (Goft-o-gu'í), and Satirical (Tanzi or Hajvi). Bahār's Official Website has made a selection of Bahār's poetry available to the general public, which the interested reader may wish to consult.

=== The Chained White Beast ===
"The Chained White Beast" is a poem by Bahar, written in 1922, in which he praises Damavand, the highest mountain in Iran, and presents it as a symbol of patriotism. The opportunity had come for the nationalists to take the floor and criticise the regime. Bahar's symbol for provoking patriotic upheavals is a reflection of the growth of the notion of nationalism which had been introduced to Iranians only few decades before. Bahar describes Damavand as a beast, and asks it to rise and wipe out injustice, and let the real Iran flourish.

== Sources ==
- Loraine, M. B.; Matīnī, J. (1988). "BAHĀR, MOḤAMMAD-TAQĪ". Encyclopaedia Iranica, Vol. III, Fasc. 5. pp. 476–479.
- Samiʿi, Ahmad; Melvin-Koushki, Matthew (2013). "Bahār, Muḥammad Taqī". In Madelung, Wilferd; Daftary, Farhad (eds.). Encyclopaedia Islamica Online. Brill Online. ISSN 1875-9831.
- Mohammad-Taqi Bahār's Official Website, in Persian: Malek o-Sh'sho'arā Bahār.
- Manuchehr Saadat Noury, First Iranian scholar who challenged the Islamic fundamentalism, Persian Journal, 4 June 2006: .
- ملک‌الشعرا بهار; his biography
- his biography

== See also ==
- Mehrdad Bahar, Mohammad-Taqi Bahār's son.
- Five-Masters
- Sayyed Hasan Taqizadeh
- Abdolhossein Teymourtash
