= Nafisi =

Nafisi (Arabic: نفيسي) is an arabic surname, that translates to "precious" (Arabic: نفيسة, nafisa). It is a common arabic surname in Iran and Persian Gulf countries. Notable people with the surname include:

- Abdullah Al-Nafisi (born 1945), Kuwaiti academic and politician
- Ahmad Nafisi (1919–2004), Iranian bureaucrat and mayor of Tehran (1961–1963)
- Amannisa Khan Nafisi, wife of Abdurashid Khan (1526–1560)
- Azar Nafisi (born 1948), Iranian-American writer and academic
- Habib Nafisi (1908–1984), Iranian academic
- Khalid Al-Nafisi (1937–2006), Kuwaiti actor
- Nezhat Nafisi (1920–2003), Iranian politician
- Saeed Nafisi (1895–1966), Iranian scholar, fiction writer and poet
- Mirza Ali Akbar Khan Nafisi (1847–1924) Iranian physician and scholar
