= City of Firsts =

Unofficial motto for Tabriz, Iran

The City of Firsts or City of Pioneers (Azerbaijani: İlklərin Şəhəri, Persian: شهر اولین‌ها, romanized: šahr avvalin-hâ) is an unofficial motto for Tabriz, a major city and provincial capital in north west of Iran. The motto is given because of the pioneering role of the city in modernization signs in Iran and its leading role in movement toward the formation of modern Iran.

== Firsts of Tabriz in the Iranian History ==
- Printing Industry: The first publication house was founded by Prince Abbas Mirza in Tabriz, And 12 years later a second publication was established in Tehran.
- Library: Tarbiat library, Iran's first public library was founded by Muhammad Ali tarbiat in 1921.
- Guest house or Hotel: Tabriz is the first city in Iran where the new style hotels and motels have been built.
- Cinema: The first public cinema in Iran (1900)
- School: The first school of primary education (New approach) in Iran was founded by Haji-Mirza Hassan Roshdieh in Tabriz (1893).
- Kindergartens and school for the Deaf & Mute: Jabbar Baghtcheban the first children's book author and publisher and founder of the first school for the Deaf & Mute in Iran.
- New Literature: Mirza Abdul'Rahim Talibov Tabrizi, founder of new composition and Mirza Fatali Akhundov, founder of the playwright in Iran. also Mirza-Agha Tabrizi the first Iranian playwright who has written plays to Persian language.
- Banknote: During the Ghikhatukhan in Mongol empire, name of money was Chaw. But people did not accept it and after a while stopped printing it.
- Chamber of Commerce: The first "Chamber of Commerce of Iran" in Tabriz (1906)
- Municipality: The first municipality in Iran Founded in 1908.
- Firefighting: The first firefighting Was established in 1842.
- Telephone: The first city in Iran that was equipped with telephone system (1901).
- Power Plant: the Iran's first power plant and factory in 1902.
- Charity Foundation NGO: The first Charity Foundation NGO in Iran Founded in 1952.
- Air Taxi: The first air taxi flight was conducted from Tabriz to Aras Free Zone (2012).
- Colonel Pessian: The first Iranian pilot and aviator.
- Hossein Sadaghiani: The first Iranian football legionnaire (1929) and first coach of Iran national football team (1941 —- 1951).
- Yahya Adl: Father's surgery.
- Javad Heyat: The vanguards of modern medicine in Iran (1962).
- Ahmad Hussein Adl: Vanguard mechanization agricultural in Iran (1930).
- Mostafa Adl: Father's Rights and Justice.
- Hamid Notghi: Founder and father of modern public relations in Iran
- Azim Gheichisaz: The first Iranian mountain climber joined 8000ers.
- and first of Football Museum (2014), Police (1907), Association for Women (1908), Seismographic station (1855), Faculty of Nursing (1916), Faculty of carpet (1994), Association of note issue, Public limited company (1900), Kindergarten (1924), Guesthouse, The formation of popular councils, Credit Card bus, Was established in Tabriz.
