= Hamid Naficy =

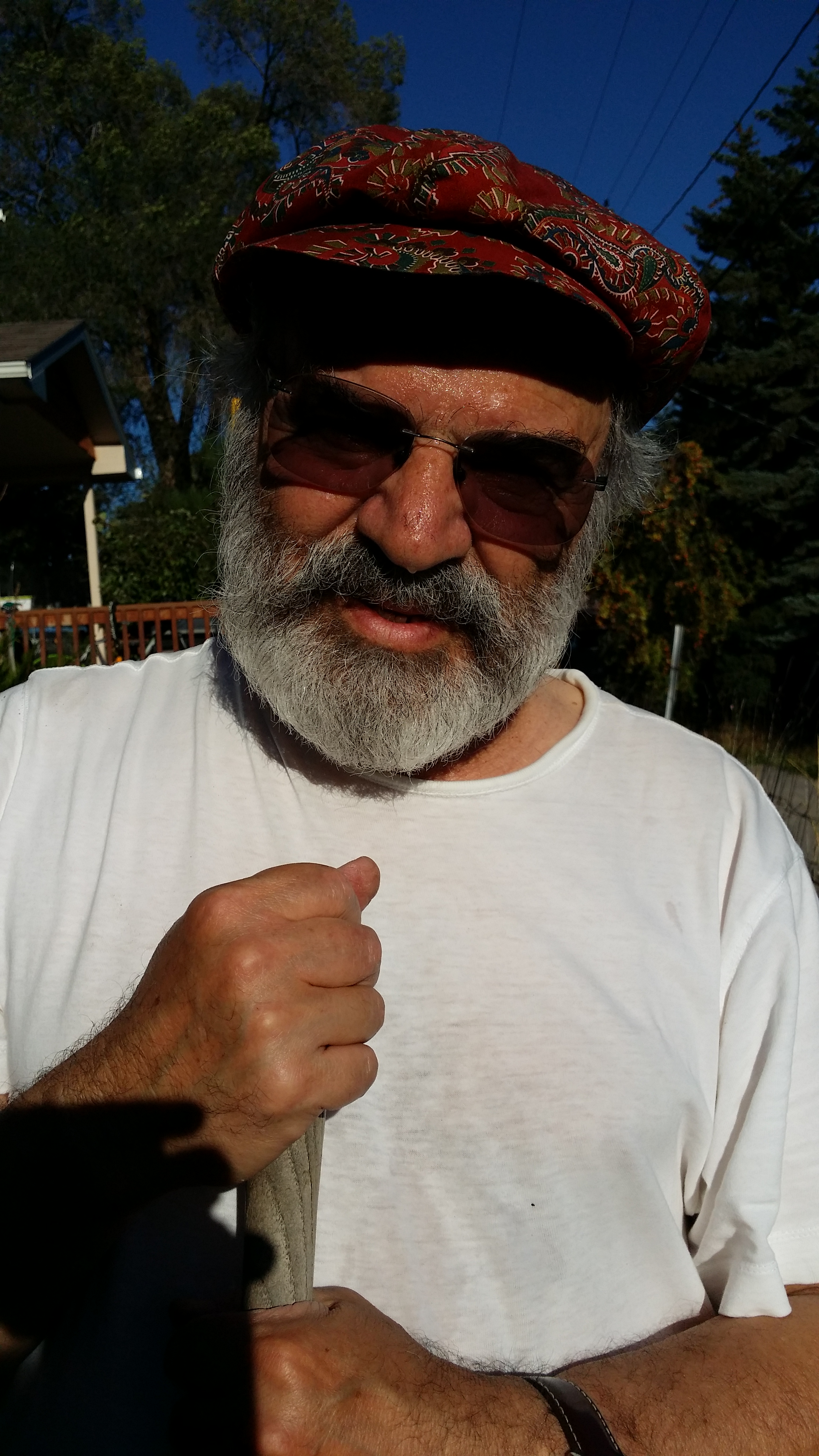
- Born: 1944 (age 81–82); Isfahan, Iran
- Education: University of Southern California (BA); University of California, Los Angeles (MFA, PhD)
- Occupations: Filmmaker, scholar of diaspora studies and media studies, professor, writer
- Employer: Northwestern University
- Known for: Cinema of Iran, Cinema of the Middle East
- Movement: Accented Cinema, Exile Cultures

Hamid Naficy (Persian: حمید نفیسی; born 1944) is an Iranian-born American filmmaker, writer, scholar, and educator. He is the Hamad Bin Khalifa Al-Thani Professor in Communication at Northwestern University in the department of Radio/Film/Television, an affiliate faculty member in the Department of Art History, and a core member of the Middle East and North African Studies Program.

His work focuses on the cultural studies of diaspora, exile, and postcolonial cinemas and media, and of Iranian and Middle Eastern cinemas. He has written on theories of exile and displacement, exilic and diaspora cinemas and media, and Iranian and Third World cinemas, publishing nearly a dozen books and scores of book chapters and journal articles. In addition, he has lectured nationally and internationally and his works have been cited and reprinted extensively and translated into many languages. His areas of research and teaching include these topics as well as documentary and ethnographic cinemas.

== Biography ==
Naficy was born in Isfahan, Iran in 1944. He is related to Azar Nafisi, Saeed Nafisi, and Habib Nafisi. His childhood interest was in photography and new technologies.

He moved to the United States in 1964, to attend university. Naficy graduated from the University of Southern California with a B.A. degree in Telecommunications; before attending the University of California, Los Angeles where he earned an M.F.A. degree in Theater Arts and a Ph.D. in Critical Studies of Film and Television.

He returned to Iran from 1973 to 1978 after being invited to assist with the design, planning, and implementation of a new, progressive, multimedia national university in Iran, The Free University of Iran (Daneshgah-e Azad-e Iran), which was closed down after the revolution.

His work, A Social History of Iranian Cinema (2012) was the winner of the Middle Eastern Studies Association's Houshang Pourshariati Iranian Studies Book Award and received an Honorable Mention for the Katherine Singer Kovács Book Award from the Society for Cinema and Media Studies. The Persian language translation of the book by Mohammad Shahba won the "Best Translation" Cinema Book Award at the 5th Annual Cinema Book Awards in Tehran, Iran, in February 2016. His book An Accented Cinema: Exilic and Diasporic Filmmaking (2001) was a finalist in 2003 for the prestigious Kraszna-Krausz Moving Image Book Award and Choice Magazine selected it as one of the "outstanding academic titles for 2002."

In addition to his books and essays, Naficy has produced many educational films and experimental videos, organized numerous symposia and lecture series, participated in major international film festivals, curated film series, and initiated the annual Iranian film festivals in Los Angeles in 1990 and in Houston in 1992.

== Selected bibliography ==
=== Books ===
==== Author ====
- Hamid Naficy (2012). A Social History of Iranian Cinema: Volume 4: The Globalizing Era, 1984–2010. Durham: Duke University Press. ISBN 978-0822348788.
- Hamid Naficy (2012). A Social History of Iranian Cinema: Volume 3: The Islamicate Period, 1978–1984. Durham: Duke University Press. ISBN 978-0822348771.
- Hamid Naficy (2011). A Social History of Iranian Cinema: Volume 2: The Industrializing Years, 1941–1978. Durham: Duke University Press. ISBN 978-0822347743.
- Hamid Naficy (2011). A Social History of Iranian Cinema: Volume 1: The Artisanal Era. Durham: Duke University Press. ISBN 978-0822347750. (Also published in a Persian translation by Mohammad Shahba)
- Hamid Naficy (2001). An Accented Cinema: Exilic and Diasporic Filmmaking. Princeton: Princeton University Press. ISBN 978-0691043913.
- Hamid Naficy (1993). The Making of Exile Cultures: Iranian Television in Los Angeles. Minneapolis: University of Minnesota Press. ISBN 978-0816620876.
- Iran Media Index. Westport, CT: Greenwood Press, 1984. (Translated in part into the Persian and published in Iran in nine installments in the monthly magazine Mahnameh-ye Sinemai-ye Film, Shahrivar 1366-Mehr 1367 [1977–78], under the title "Iran az Cheshm-e Biganeh" [Iran Through the Eyes of Foreigners]).

==== Editor ====
- Home, Exile, Homeland: Film, Media, and the Politics of Place. Editor. London & New York: Routledge, 1999. An AFI Film Reader.
- Otherness and the Media: The Ethnography of the Imagined and the Imaged. Co-edited with Teshome Gabriel. New York: Harwood Academic Publishing, 1993.

=== Book chapters ===
(Only recent items are listed)

- Collecting Pre- and Post-Revolution Iranian Movie Posters in the US and in Iran, in Collecting Prints, Posters, and Ephemera. Edited by Britany Salsbury and Ruth E. Iskin. Bloomsbury Academic [due out in 2019].
- Iranian Postrevolution Cinema: A Rising Global Cinema. A printed 63-page booklet based on my keynote talk at International Institute of Social History for Sadighi Annual Lectures. Amsterdam, The Netherland: International Institute of Social History, 2016.
- The Politics and Poetics of Iranian Art-House Cinema, Inside the Islamic Republic: Social Change in Post-Khomeini Iran. Edited by Mahmood Monshipouri. London: Hurst & Company, 2016. pp. 201–219.
- Lured by the East: Ethnographic and Expedition Films about Nomadic Tribes—the Case of Grass (1924), in The Documentary Film Reader: History, Theory, Criticism, Jonathan Kahana, editor. New York: Oxford University Press, 2016, pp. 93-109. Reprinted from: Lured by the East: Ethnographic and Expedition Films about Nomadic Tribes—the Case of Grass (1924), in Virtual Voyages: Cinema and Travel. Edited by Jeffrey Ruoff. Duke University Press. 2006. Pp. 117-138.
- Branch-Campus Initiatives to Train Media-Makers and Journalists: Northwestern University's Branch Campus in Doha, Qatar, in The Education of the Filmmaking in Africa, the Middle East, and the Americas. Edited by Metter Hjort. London: Palgrave, 2013. Pp. 81-98.
- Embodied Protest, in Mitra Tabrizian: Another Country. Ostfildern, Germany: Hatje Cantz Verlag. 2012. Pp. 16-20.
- Accented Filmmaking and Risk taking in the Age of Postcolonial Militancy, Terrorism, globalization, Wars, Oppression, and Occupation, in Film and Risk. Edited by Mette Hjort. Detroit: Wayne State University Press, 2012. Pp. 143-164.
- Teaching Accented Films as a Global Cinema, in Teaching Film. Edited by Lucy Fischer and Patrice Petro. New York: Modern Language Association Publication, 2012. Pp. 112-118.
- Neorealism Iranian Style, in Global Neorealism: The Transnational History of a Film Style. Edited by Saverio Giovacchini and Robert Sklar. University Press of Mississippi. 2012. Pp. 226-239.
- The Aesthetics and Politics of Iranian Cinema in Exile, in Asian Film Journeys: Selections from Cinemaya. Edited by Rashmi Doraiswamy & Latika Padgaonkar. New Delhi: Wisdom Tree, 2010. Pp. 221-226
- From Accented Cinema to Multiplex Cinema, in Convergence Media History. Edited by Janet Staiger and Sabine Hake. New York: Routledge, 2009. Pp. 3-13.
- Faster than a Speeding Bullet, More Powerful than a Locomotive—Mutual Instrumentalization of Culture, Cinema, and Media by Iran and the U.S., in Media, Power, and Politics in the Digital Age: The 2009 Presidential Election Uprising in Iran. Edited by Yahya R. Kamalipour. New York: Rowman & Littlefield Publishers. 2010. Pp. 205-220.
- Iranian Émigré Cinema as a Component of Iranian National Cinema, in Media, Culture and Society in Iran: Living with Globalization and the Islamic State. Edited by Mehdi Semati. London & New York: Routledge, 2008. Pp. 167-192.
- Ethnography and African Culture: Jean Rouch on La Chasse Au Lion à l'Arc and Les Maîtres Fous, in Building Bridges: The Cinema of Jean Rouch. Edited by Joram ten Brink. London. Wallflower Press. 2007. Pp. 97-108.
- On the Global Inter-, Multi-, and Trans- —Foreword, in Projecting Migration: Transcultural Documentary Practice. Edited by Alan Grossman and Aine O'Brien. London: Wallflower. 2007. Pp. xiii-xv.
- Theorizing 'Third World' Film Spectatorship: The Case of Iran and Iranian Cinema, in Genre, Gender, Race, and Global Cinema. Edited by Julie Codell. London: Blackwell Publishing. 2007. pp. 369–387. Reprinted from Rethinking Third Cinema.
- Palestinian Exilic Cinema and Film Letters, in Dreams of a Nation: On Palestinian Cinema. Edited by Hamid Dabashi. New York: Verso. 2006. pp. 90–104.
- Situating Accented Cinema, in Transnational Cinema: The Film Reader. Edited Elizabeth Ezra and Terry Rowden. London and New York: Routledge. 2006. pp. 111–129. Excerpted from An Accented Cinema.

=== Films ===
==== Personal ====
- Salamander Syncope (1971), 24:42-minutes, 2-inch, color videotape, Master of Fine Arts thesis. A pioneering computer-animated film tracing the inner world of human consciousness and the external world of the cosmos.
- Blacktop (1970), 7:32-minutes experimental half-inch videotape
- The Piano Player (Fall 1969), 10-minute surrealistic, self-reflexive, multi-camera TV melodrama
- REM (1969), 28-minute video drama shot with a Sony Portapak DV2400 and 2-inch videotape
- Ellis Island: A Commune (1969), a 37-minute video documentary

==== Educational ====
- The Tutor's Guide (1985), a 14-part television series of 15-minute episodes designed to train new university-level tutors, distributed by Great Plains National Education Media.
- Beethoven: Triumph Over Silence (1984), 37 min, Distributed by Pyramid Media.
- Hearing Loss (1982), distributed by American Medical Association on cassette and aired by cable television channels across the country.
- Sexually Transmitted Disease (1982), distributed by American Medical Association on cassette and aired by cable television channels across the country.
- Chronic Obstructive Pulmonary Disease (1981), distributed by American Medical Association on cassette and aired by cable television channels across the country.
- Kabutarkhan [Pigeon Towers] (1978), a 30-minute documentary, part of a series on "indigenous technologies of Iran"
- Sonnat-e Qanat dar Iran [The Qanat Tradition in Iran] (1977), a 30-minute documentary, part of a series on "indigenous technologies of Iran"
