= Fatemeh Keshavarz =

Iranian academic, scholar, and poet

- Born: Shiraz, Iran
- Education: M.A., Ph.D.
- Alma mater: Shiraz University; University of London
- Occupations: academic, scholar, poet
- Notable work: Reading Mystical Lyric: the Case of Jalal al-Din Rumi (1998)

Fatemeh Keshavarz Ph.D. (Persian: فاطمه كشاورز) is an Iranian academic, Rumi and Persian studies scholar, and a poet in Persian and English. She is the Roshan Chair of Persian Studies and Director of the Roshan Institute for Persian Studies at the University of Maryland, since 2012. Previously, she served as a professor of Persian Language and Comparative Literature for 20 years and chair of the department of Asian and Near Eastern Languages and Literatures at Washington University in St. Louis from 2004 to 2011.

Over the years, she has published several notable books including Reading Mystical Lyric: the Case of Jalal al-Din Rumi (1998), Recite in the Name of the Red Rose (2006) and Jasmine and Stars: Reading more than Lolita in Tehran (2007). As an activist for peace and justice, in 2008 she received the Hershel Walker 'Peace and Justice' Award.

== Early life and education ==
Born and brought up in Shiraz, Iran, Fatemeh Keshavarz holds a B.A. (1976) in Persian Language and Literature from Shiraz University, and an M.A. (1981) and a PhD (1985) in Near Eastern Studies from the School of Oriental and African Studies,the University of London.

== Career ==
Keshavarz taught at Washington University in St. Louis from 1990 until 2012. She served as Director of the Graduate Program in Jewish, Islamic, and Near Eastern Studies, Director of the Center for the Study of Islamic Societies and Civilizations, President of the Association of Women Faculty, and Chair of the Department of Asian and Near Eastern Languages and Literatures. In 2012, she became the Director and Chair of the Roshan Institute Center for Persian Studies at the University of Maryland.

Among Keshavarz's works is her book Jasmine and Stars: Reading more than Lolita in Tehran. The book offers ideas in contrast to Azar Nafisi's Reading Lolita in Tehran: A Memoir in Books (Random House, 2003) which explores the relationship between literature and society in post-revolutionary Iran. Keshavarz believes that Nafisi's book presents "many damaging misrepresentations" of Iran and its people, relying more on stereotypes and easy comparisons than on an accurate portrayal of the country and its people.

In 2008, the On Being radio program Speaking of Faith: The Ecstatic Faith of Rumi, on which Keshavarz was a featured guest in 2007 for American Public Media, was granted a Peabody Award. The Peabody Award is considered electronic media's most coveted trophy in the United States. That same year, Keshavarz also addressed the United Nations General Assembly on "the significance of cultural education for world peace."

== Books ==
- Fatemeh Keshavarz, Talashi dar Aghaz (An Effort at the Beginning), collection of poems (Shiraz University Press, Shiraz, 1976).
- Fatameh Keshavarz, A Descriptive and Analytical Catalogue of Persian Manuscripts in the Library of the Wellcome Institute for the History of Medicine (The Wellcome Institute for the History of Medicine, London, 1986) — Winner of the Dunne & Wilson Award. ISBN 0-85484-052-4
- Fatemeh Keshavarz, Reading Mystical Lyric: The Case of Jalal al-Din Rumi, Studies in Comparative Religion (University of North Carolina Press, Columbia, S.C., 1998). ISBN 1-57003-584-9
- Fatemeh Keshavarz, Recite in the Name of the Red Rose: Poetic Sacred Making in Twentieth-century Iran, Studies in Comparative Religion (University of North Carolina Press, Columbia, S.C., 2006). ISBN 1-57003-622-5
- Fatemeh Keshavarz, Jasmine and Stars: Reading more than Lolita in Tehran (University of North Carolina Press, Columbia, S.C., 2007). ISBN 0-8078-3109-3
- Fatemeh Keshavarz, Lyrics of Life: Sa'di on Love, Cosmopolitanism, and Care of the Self (Edinburgh University Press, Edinburgh, 2015). ISBN 978 0 7486 9692 5

== Awards ==
- Dunne & Wilson Award for the PhD Thesis selected as "a work of distinction" at University of London (1986).
- Association of Women Faculty Appreciation Award (2000).
- Faculty Mentoring Award (2000-2001).
- The Peabody Award for the program "The Ecstatic Faith of Rumi" with Krista Tippet on NPR (2007).

== See also ==
- List of notable Iranian women
