= Azadi Cinema Complex =

Cinema in Tehran, Iran

- پردیس سینمایی آزادی
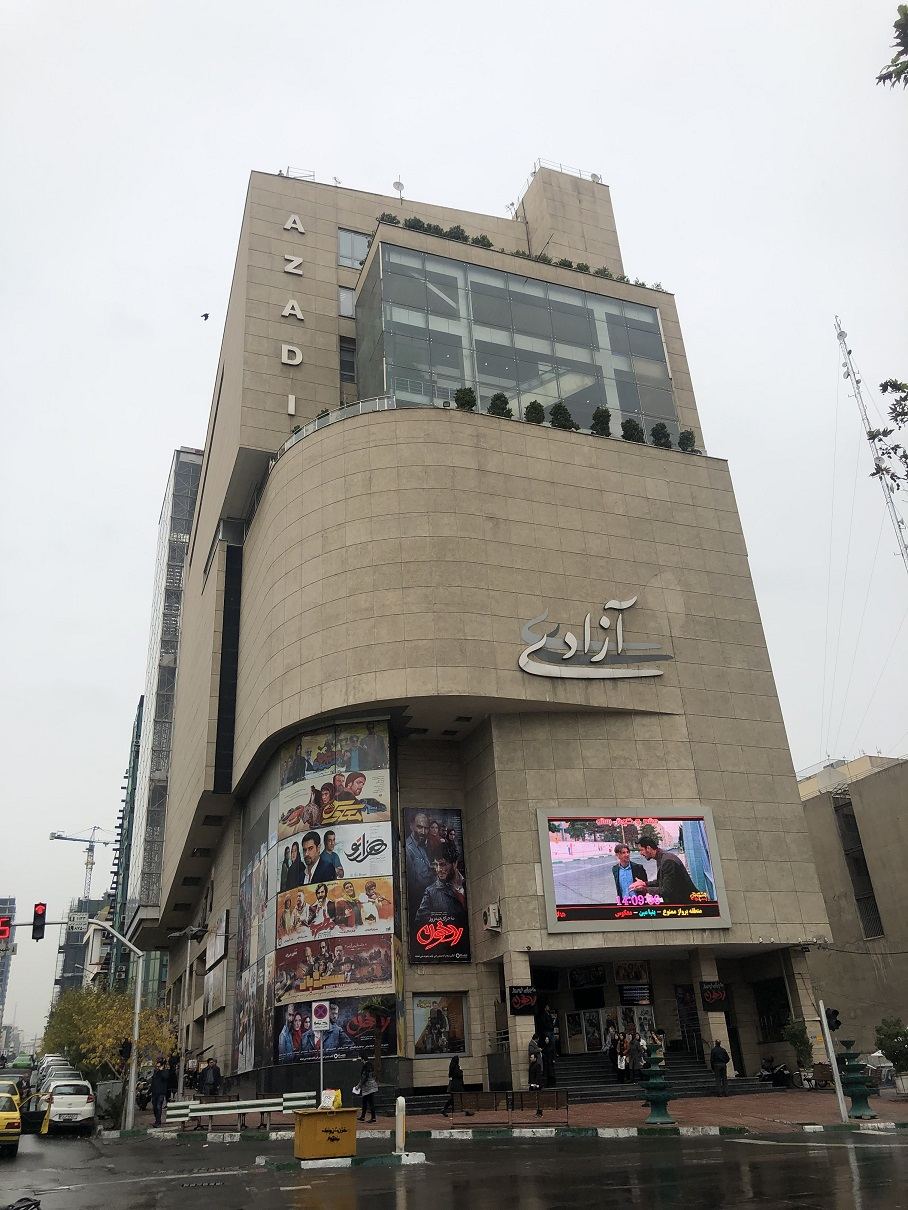

- Location within Iran

General information
- Status: Completed
- Type: Cinema
- Location: Tehran, Iran
- Coordinates: 35°43′41″N 51°24′58″E
- Opening: 1969 (rebuild in 2008)

Height
- Roof: 60 m (200 ft)

Technical details
- Floor count: 10
- Floor area: 850 m^{2} (9,100 sq ft)

References
- https://web.archive.org/web/20101226094252/http://www.cinema-azadi.com/Fa/Facilities.aspx?p=fs

Azadi Cinema Complex is a cineplex building located at Beheshti Street in Tehran. It is used for movie premieres and various entertainment events.

== History ==
The cinema was inaugurated on 23 April 1969 as Shahr-e Farang Cinema. Following the Iranian Revolution, it was renamed Azadi Cinema in 1980. It had two screens.

Located on Beheshti street, in district 6, the building caught fire on numerous occasions in 1976, 1990, and on 18 April 1997, which caused its closure. Zeydabadi-Nejad writes, "Of particular importance among cinema halls was Azadi, one of the most popular in Tehran." It hosted the Imposed War Film Festival in 1983.

== Reconstruction ==
The cinema was destroyed by a fire in 1998. The site was left vacant for 8 years.

A new cineplex was opened, in 2008. Azadi Cinema Complex now has five screens, one with 600 seats and others with 200 each. The complex is one of the major cineplexes in Tehran, with the one at Mellat Park.

== See also ==
- A Social History of Iranian Cinema Vols. 1 thru 4 by Hamid Naficy

== Gallery ==
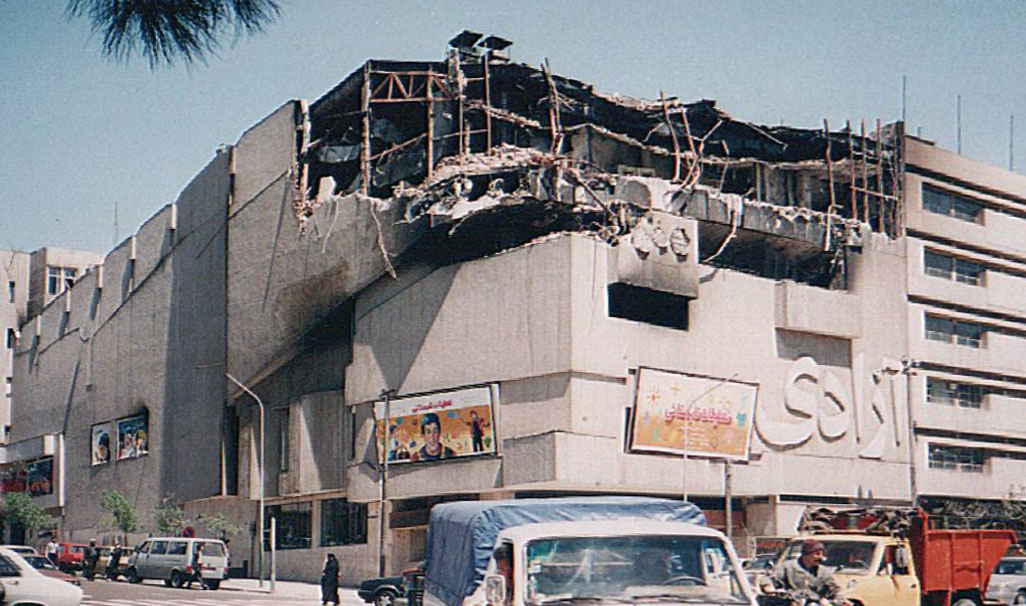
1997

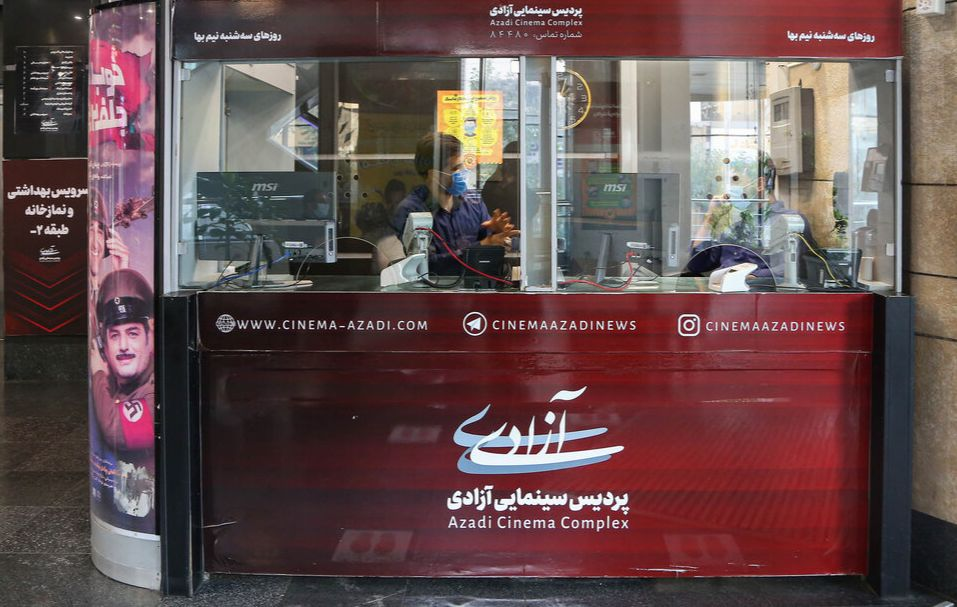

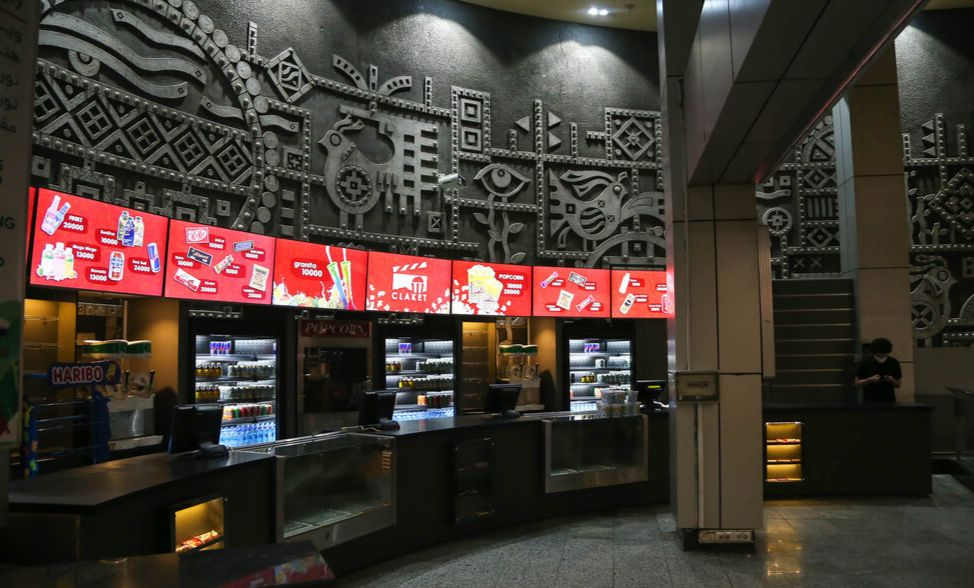

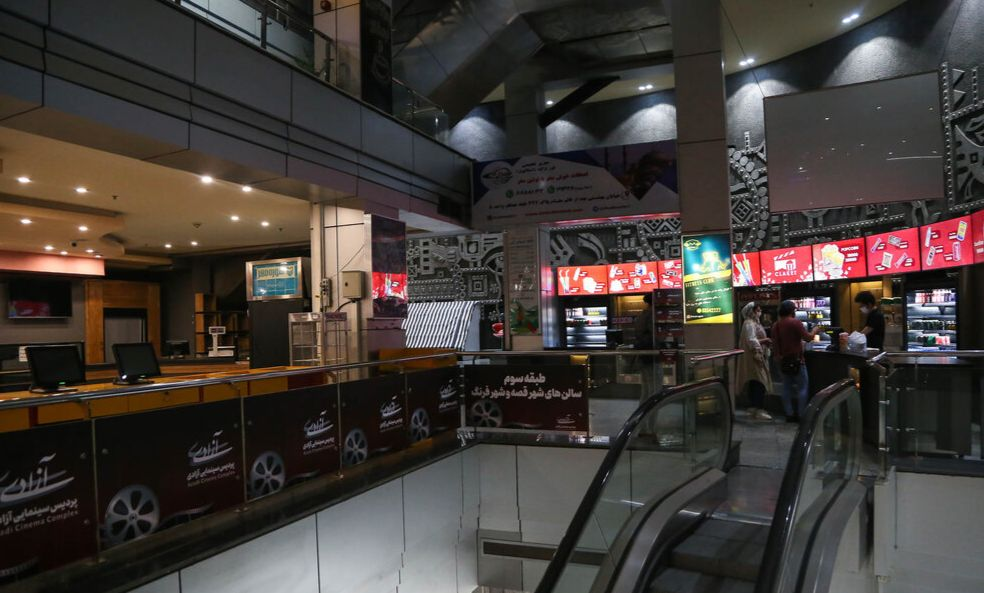

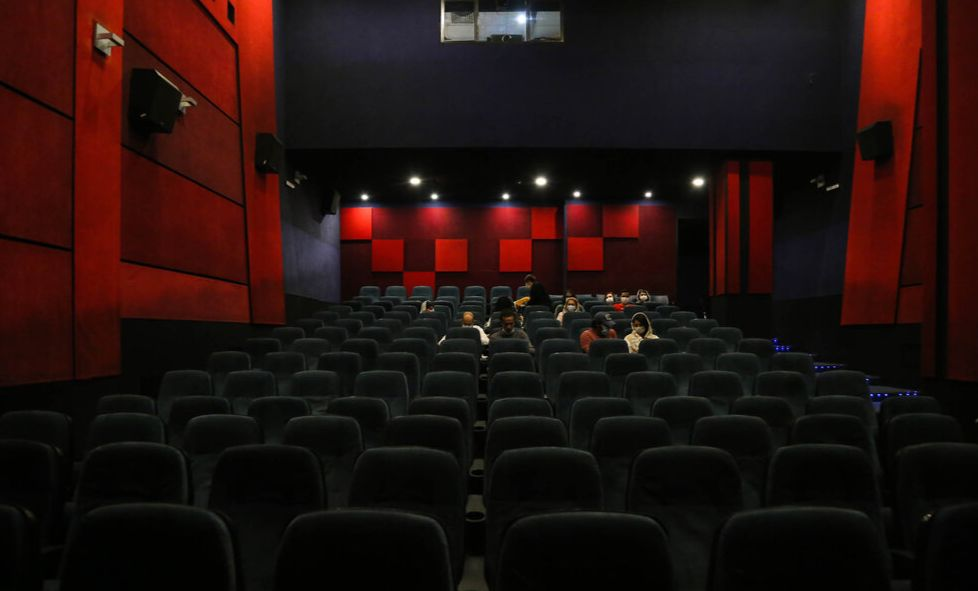

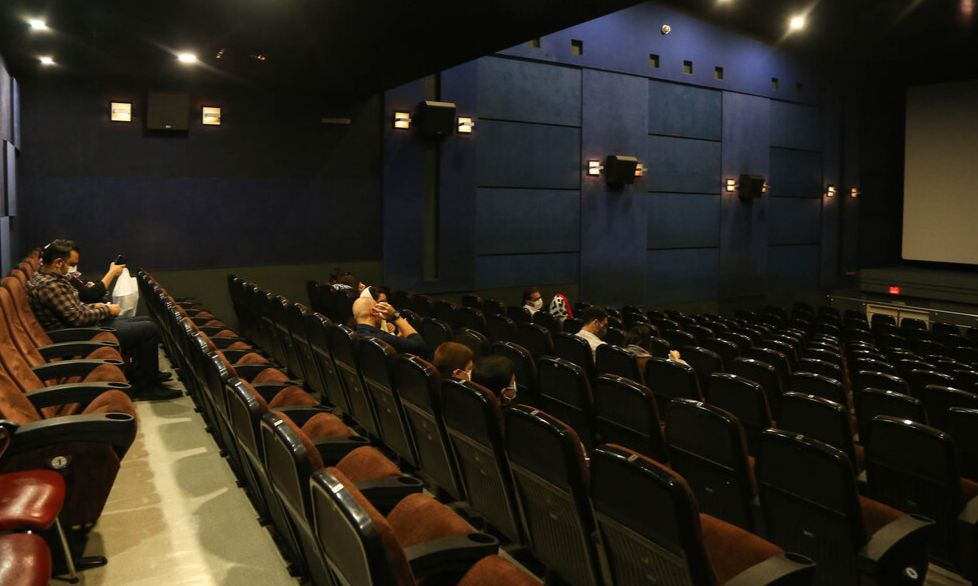
