= 1847 in Iran =

- Decades
- See also: Other events of 1847; Years in Iran

The following lists events that happened during 1847 in the Qajar era.

== Incumbents ==
- Monarch: Mohammad Shah Qajar

== Births ==
- April 1 – Mohammad Vali Khan Khalatbari Tonekaboni, Prime minister and General.
- September 29 – Kamal-ol-molk, Iranian artist.
- ? – Nazem al-Atebba, Iranian physician and essayist.
