= Ali Akbar Siassi =

Iranian intellectual, psychologist and politician

Ali-Akbar Siassi
- علی‌اکبر سیاسی
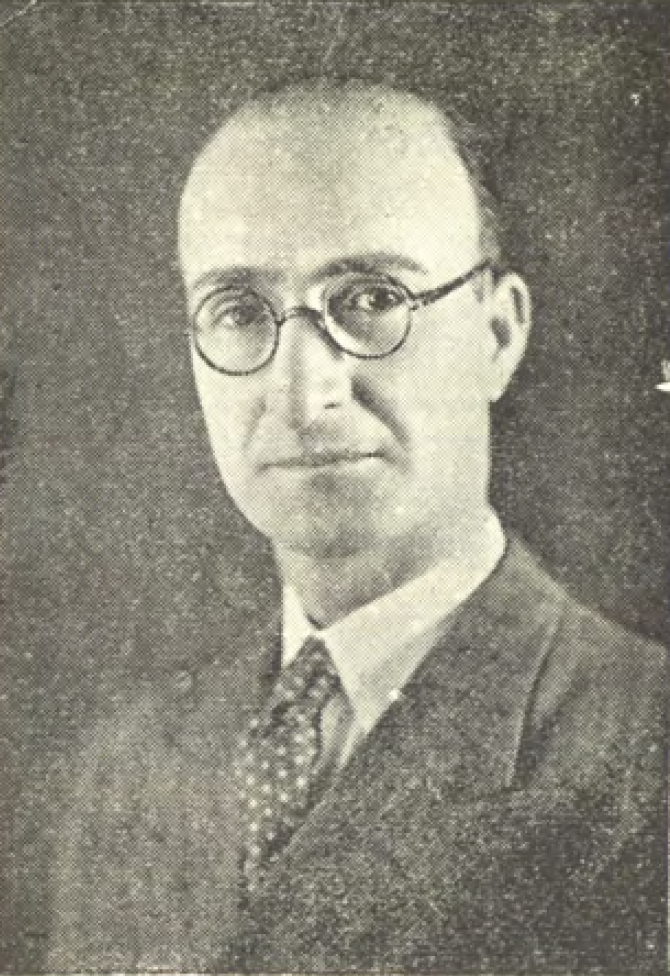

Minister of Foreign Affairs
- In office 13 January 1950 – 24 February 1950
- Prime Minister: Mohammad Sa'ed
- Preceded by: Hossein Navab
- Succeeded by: Hossein Navab

Minister of Education
- In office 6 August 1943 – 6 April 1944
- Prime Minister: Ali Soheili
- Preceded by: Mostafa Adl
- Succeeded by: Ali Riazi

Personal details
- Born: 1896 Tehran, Qajar Iran
- Died: 27 May 1990 (aged 93–94) Tehran, Iran
- Spouse: Roshandoleh Bayat
- Relations: Mohammad Hassan Sadeghi (Father)
- Children: Iradj, Bijan, Fereydoun, Jaleh
- Awards: Nishan-e Elmi; Commandeur de la Légion d'honneur; Commandeur Palmes academiques

Ali-Akbar Siassi PhD (Persian: علی‌اکبر سیاسی, romanized: Alī-Akbar Siyāsī; 1896 – 27 May 1990) was an Iranian intellectual, psychologist and politician during the 1930s and 1960s, serving as the country's education and foreign minister, chancellor of University of Tehran, minister of education (1943–1944), minister of foreign affairs (1945), minister of state without portfolio (1945). He drafted bill and law for National Compulsory Free Education, and took necessary measures for its enforcement 1943.

Prof. of University of Tehran from 1927, head of Department of Advanced Studies of the Minister of Education in 1932, drafted bill and law for national compulsory free education, and took necessary measures for its enforcement 1943, member of the Supreme Council of Education, del III International Congress of Persian Art and Archaeology 1935, UN conference San Francisco 1945, President of the Iranian del. UNESCO Conference Paris 1949, UNESCO Conference Paris 1951, International Conference of Universities Mexico City 1960, Permanent member of the Persian Academy, Honorary President of the University of Tehran, Member of International Committee Scientific and Cultural History of Humanity, President of Iranian Psychological Association, co-founder and President Irane-Djavan Association is other Siassi's positions.; Commandeur de la Légion d'Honneur (France) en qualité de Recteur de L'université de Teheran 1946, Commandeur de Palmes Académiques (France).

Publications include: L'Education en Perse 1921, La Perse au contact de l'occident 1931, L'Iran au XIXe Siècle (all in French), Psychology 1938, Educational Psychology for Teacher's college 1941, Introduction to philosophy 1947, Logic and Methodology 1948, Mind and Body 1953, The Psychology of Avicenna and its similarities with the Modern Psychology 1954, Logic 1956, Ethics 1957, Logic and philosophy 1958, Psychology of Personality 1970, Theories of Personality 1975 (all in Persian).
