= Varlyq =

- Categories: Literature
- Frequency: Quarterly
- First issue: 1979; 46 years ago
- Country: Iran
- Based in: Tehran
- Language: Azerbaijani; Persian

Varlyq (/ˈvɑːrlɪk/ VAR-lik; Azerbaijani: وارلؽق, romanized: Vārlıq, lit. 'Existence', pronounced [vɑɾˈlɯx]) is a bilingual quarterly literary magazine in Azerbaijani and Persian languages published in Tehran, Iran.

== History and profile ==
Varlyq was established by Javad Heyat with Hamid Notghi and Gholamhossein Bigdeli and other Iranian Azerbaijani poets and writers in 1979. Its main focus is on Turkic languages spoken in Iran, such as Azerbaijani, Turkmen, Qashqai, Khorasani, Sonqori dialects.

The magazine, in addition to research areas in Turkology, focuses on written Turkish literature and Azerbaijani literature in Iran and its alphabet, strengthening cultural links between Persians and Azerbaijanis. It also promotes Iranian Turks' issues in academic circles such as conferences and seminars.

Several contributors of the magazine were arrested by the Iranian authorities and put in Evin prison in September 2008.
