= Amannisa Khan =

Concubine of Yarkent Abdurashid Khan (1526–1560)

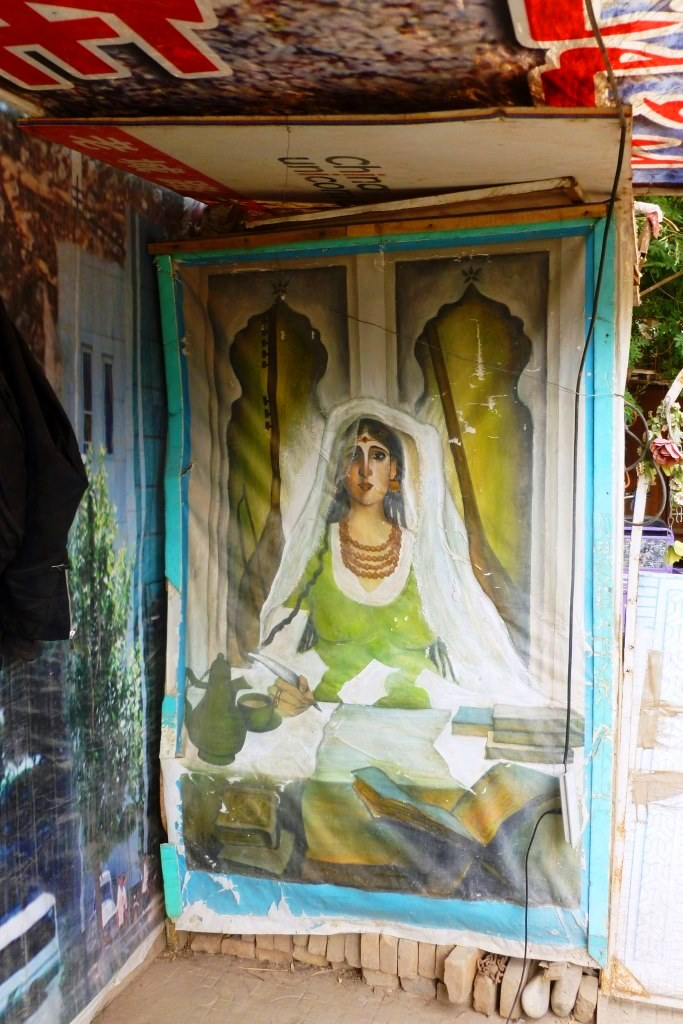
- Born: c. 1526
- Died: 1560 (aged 33–34)
- Known for: 12 Muqam

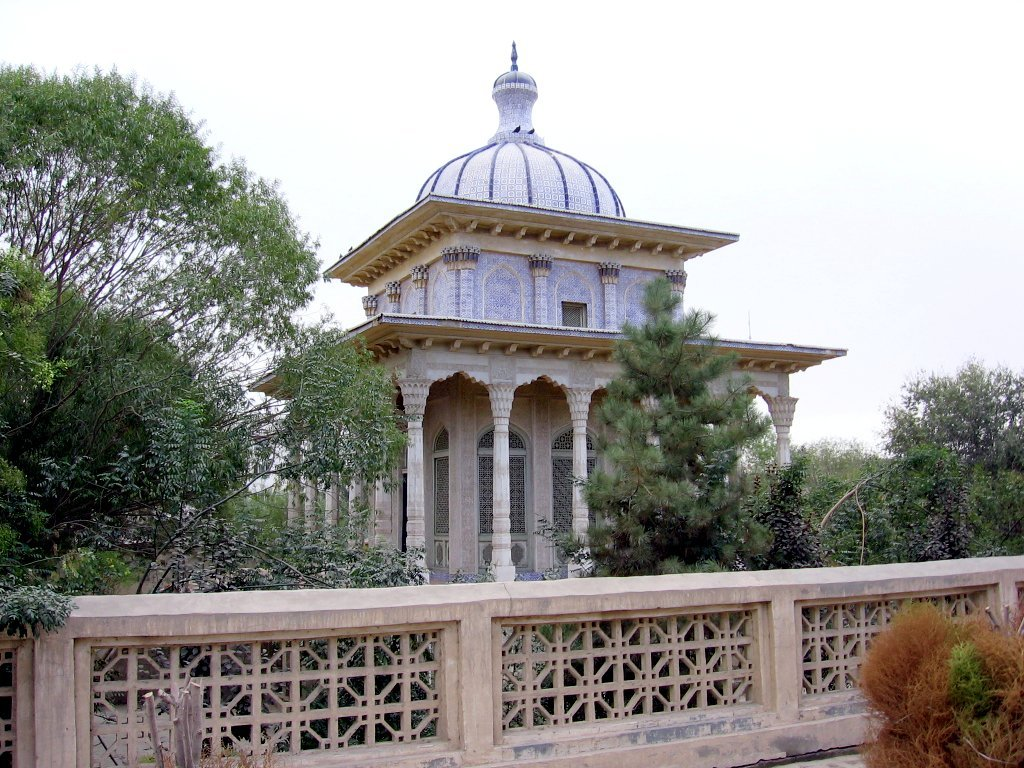
Amannisa Khan's mausoleum

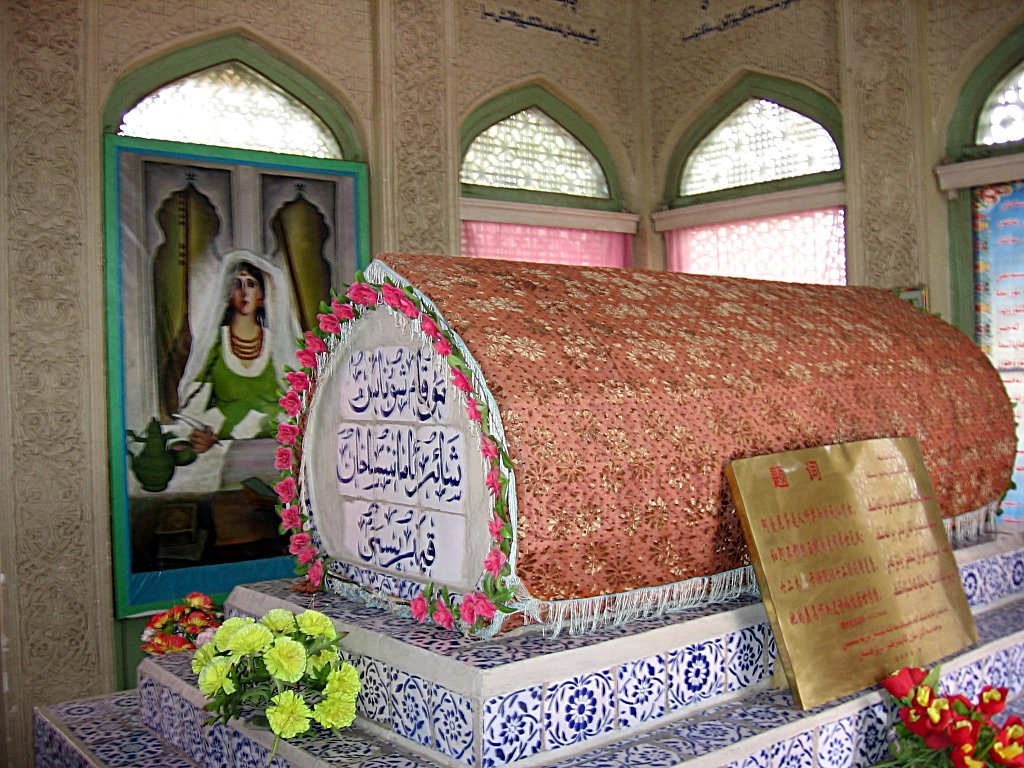
Tomb of Amanissa Khan in the Royal Altun Cemetery in Yarkand

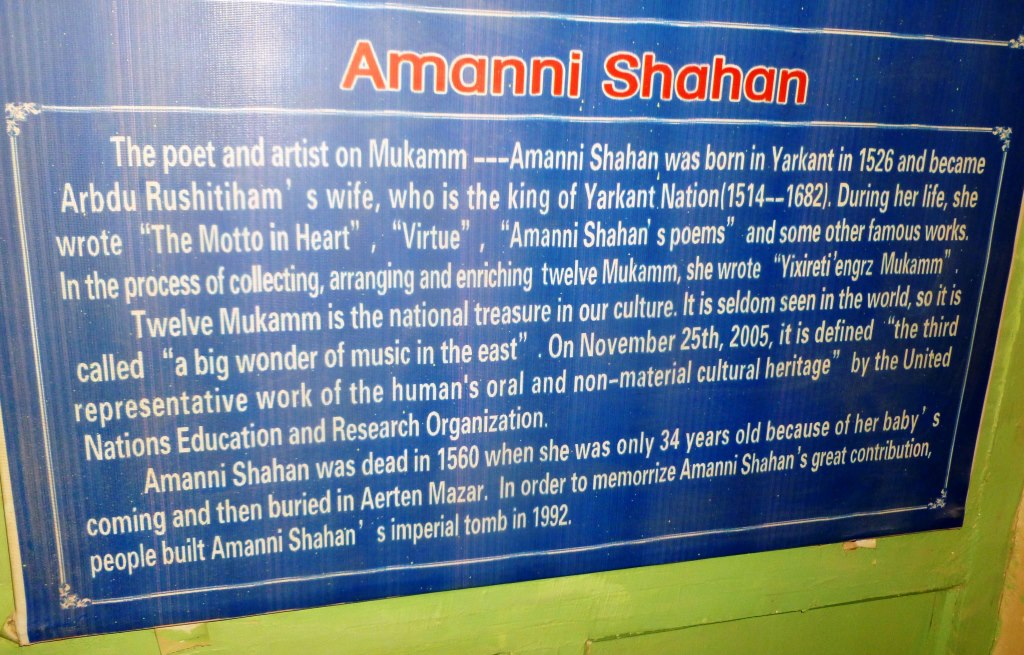
Amanni Shahan stgn. Yarkand. 2011

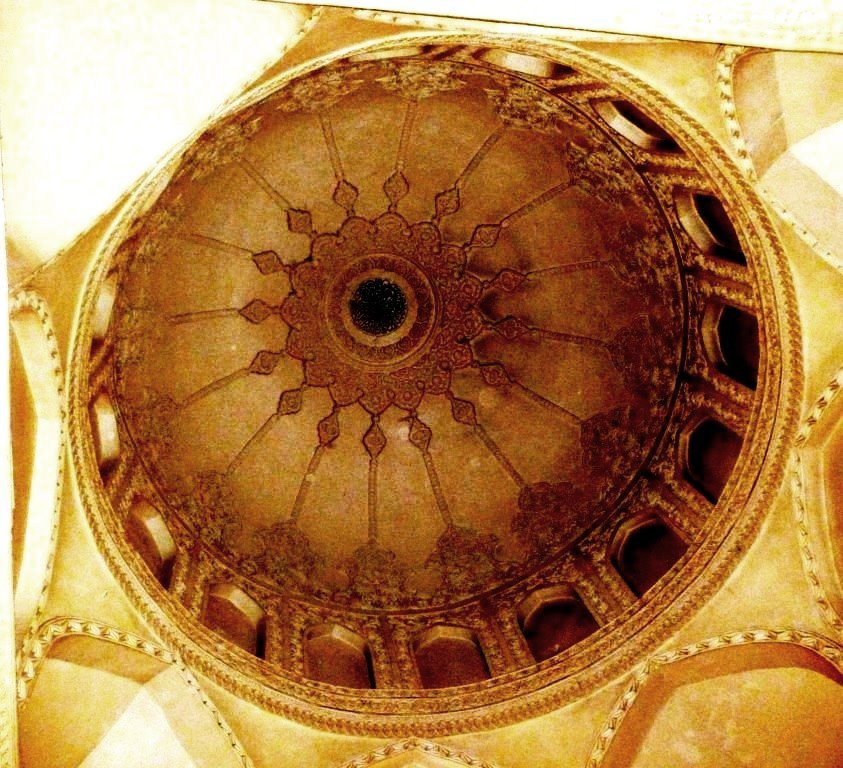
Dome of Amanni Shahan's mausoleum. Yarkand. 2011

Āmānnisā Khan Nāfisi, also known as Amanni Shahan (Uyghur: ئاماننىسا خان; Chinese: 阿蔓尼莎汗; pinyin: Āmànníshā Hàn; c. 1526–1560), was a concubine of Abdurashid Khan of the Yarkent Khanate. She is credited with collecting and thereby preserving the Twelve Muqam, which is today considered a musical style of the Uyghur people of Northwest China. The Muqam of Xinjiang has been designated by UNESCO as part of the Intangible Heritage of Humanity.

Amannisa Khan was born on the banks of the Tizinafu River in an area inhabited by the pre-Uyghur Dolan people, which is modern-day Tashkurgan Tajik Autonomous County. Her father, Muhamode, was a forester. When she was thirteen years old, Abdurashid Khan was hunting and occasionally heard her singing. Soon, he burst into her father's shack and demanded to hear a song. She dedicated a ghazal to his benevolence and he was so impressed that he paid her father the bride price to take her. She became Queen of the Yarkand Khanate, composing Muqams and other musical works for which her husband supposedly took credit. She died in childbirth at age 34 and her remains were buried in Royal Cemetery Park near Yarkent.

The only known source mentioning her by name is the 1854 History of Musicians (Tavārikh-i mūsīqiyyūn) by Mu'jiz (Mojize). That manuscript was translated into the modern Uyghur language by the Nationalities Research Institute of the Chinese Academy of Sciences in 1982.

She was promoted as a cultural hero by the People's Republic of China for certain approved characteristics, including being born in the area and being from a background of poverty and close to peasants. Seypidin Azizi, the first Chinese Communist leader of Xinjiang, published a play about her in 1983, which portrayed Amannisa's conflict with Abdurashid's first wife, Yadigar.

In the 1990s, a mausoleum was built in her birthplace to honour her contribution to Uyghur culture.
