= Adl =

Arabic word for justice

- Arabic: عدل
- Romanization: ʻadl
- Literal meaning: "balanced"

ʿAdl (Arabic: عَدْل, romanized: ʻadl) is an Arabic word meaning "balanced" or "justice", and is also one of the names of God in Islam. It is equal to the concept of insaf (انصاف, lit. "sense of justice") in the Baháʼí Faith.

Adil (Arabic: عادل, romanized: ʻādil), and Adeel (Arabic: عديل, romanized: ʻadīl) are male names derived from ʻadl and are common throughout the Islamic world.

== In Islamic jurisprudence ==
The Foundations of Justice for Legal Guardians, Governors, Princes, Meritorious Rulers, and Kings (Usman dan Fodio)

Adl, as used by early theorists of Islamic jurisprudence, referred to an aspect of an individual's character.

This aspect is best translated as probity. In a hadith, Islamic prophet Muhammad said that, the meaning of wasat ("moderation") is adl ("justice").

== In Islamic theology ==
Adl is another word for divine justice in Islam.

== Family name ==
The origin of the modern Persian family name Adl is from the titles of nobility given to Iranian jurists at the end of the 19th century, that were related by family ties.

Notably, these jurists included Mirza Husain Noori Tabarsi, also known as "Hossein Shah", whose title was ʻAdl al-Mulk ("Justice of the Kingdom"), Sayyid Mirza Ebrahim Khalil, whose title was Rukn al-Idalah ("Pillar of Justice"), and Mirza Mostafa Khan Adl, whose title was Mansur al-Saltanah ("Victorious of the Empire").

== See also ==
- Glossary of Islam
- Outline of Islam
