= Salamander Syncope =

Salamander Syncope (1971) 24-minute work directed and produced by Hamid Naficy on 2-inch, color videotape and 16mm film for his Master of Fine Arts thesis at University of California, Los Angeles. Naficy produced the work in conjunction with the UCLA computer department. He collaborated over two years with six computer engineering students including internet pioneer Vint Cerf. Long ignored in scholarly circles, the film has begun to be discussed as an early example of computer-generated cinema, specifically experimental and countercultural cinema produced in the United States by an Iranian immigrant.

== Influences ==
The imagery in the film is abstract, generated by computers and subsequently manipulated with additional computers and video processing tools. It is thematically indebted to Stanley Kubrick's 1968 2001: A Space Odyssey, with imagery such as the origin of modern humans and the development to the transcendent "Star Child" evoked through abstract computer-generated imagery. Naficy sought to represent "inner and outer consciousness." Naficy was also influenced the writings and ideas of Alan Watts, Aldous Huxley, Gene Youngblood, and Buckminster Fuller. In terms of contemporary experimental film and video, Naficy was only familiar with some of John Whitney's films at the time.

== Soundtrack ==
Fellow UCLA student Ken Yapkowitz's quadraphonic score combines the use of Moog synthesizers and recordings of Muslim preachers recorded at Naficy's uncle's house.
