= Ozma Adle =

Iranian translator and activist

Ozma Adle Banou
- عظمی عدل (نفیسی)
- Born: c. 1920; Tabriz, Iran
- Died: 11 March 2024
- Other name: Ozma Adl-Nafisi
- Known for: Literary translator, educator, social activist
- Spouse: Habib Nafisi
- Children: 3
- Relatives: Yahya Adl (brother)

Ozma Adle (Persian: عظمی عدل; c. 1920 – 11 March 2024), also known as Ozma Naficy or Ozma Adl-Naficy, was an Iranian literary translator, educator and social activist. She was amongst the first Iranian women to publish Persian translations of French literature, such as works by Henri Bordeaux, Alphonse Daudet, George Sand, Stendhal and Marcel Proust.

Adle also worked in the Iranian Ministry of Labour, where she directed the department responsible for the affairs of women and child workers in the late 1940s.

== Early life and education ==
Adle was born in Tabriz in 1919/1920. Her father, Yusuf Khan Adl, a landlord, was a politician who represented Tabriz in the National Consultative Assembly. Her mother, Amirzadeh Khanum (aka Qamar), was a daughter of Manuchehr Mirza Manuchehri, a member of the Qajar dynasty. Her brothers included Yahya Adl, a surgeon and university professor, and Gholamreza Adl.

Adl family moved to Tehran in her childhood. She attended the Jeanne d'Arc School, where she received her primary and secondary education in both Persian and French. She later studied French literature at the University of Tehran.

Adle developed an interest in literary translation during childhood. According to an interview with her, she translated a work by the French children's writer Comtesse de Ségur into Persian at approximately the age of ten, although this translation was never published.

== Literary career and translations ==
Adle's first published translation was Jameh-ye Pashmin (جامه پشمین), a Persian translation of Henri Bordeaux's novel La Robe de laine, published in the late 1930s while she was still a teenager. During a her visits to France, she met Bordeaux, who encouraged her to translate another of his works, La Peur de vivre.

Over the years, Adle continued translating French literature into Persian, including:

- Jameh-ye Pashmin (جامه پشمین), from La Robe de laine by Henri Bordeaux
- Tars az Zendegi (ترس از زندگی), from La Peur de vivre by Henri Bordeaux
- Dastan-haye Doshanbe (داستان‌های دوشنبه), from Contes du lundi by Alphonse Daudet
- Marki de Vilmer (مارکی دو ویلمر), from Le Marquis de Villemer by George Sand
- Sorkh va Siah (سرخ و سیاه), from Le Rouge et le Noir by Stendhal
- Eshq-e Svan (عشق سوان), from Un amour de Swann by Marcel Proust

Adle also undertook comparative research in France on the fables of Jean de La Fontaine and their relationship to the Kalila wa-Dimna tradition. She continued this research at the Sorbonne as part of her doctoral programme but because of her husband's illness and circumstances surrounding the Iranian Revolution of 1979, she did not defend her dissertation, .

Her research was published in Persian translation under the title Hekayat-haye Kalileh va Demneh be Revayat-e La Fontaine (حکایت‌های کلیله و دمنه به روایت لافونتن).

== Career at the Ministry of Labour ==
In 1946, Adle began working for the Iranian Ministry of Labour. At first she worked in its public announcements office before moving to the ministry's main administration. Finalley she became head of the department responsible for women and child workers, making her amongst the very first women to hold an administrative leadership position in the ministry.

Her responsibilities concerned the circumstances of employed women and working-class families. In a 1984 oral history interview, Adle discussed working conditions for women, attitudes towards women's employment and the development of women's organisations during the Pahlavi period.

Historian Camron Michael Amin examined Adle's experience in the ministry in The Making of the Modern Iranian Woman, placing her within the broader history of women's employment and state policies in twentieth-century Iran.

== Social activities and women's organisations ==
Adle participated in several charitable and women's organisations during the Pahlavi period. She was associated with the Ashraf Pahlavi Charitable Foundation, served among the founding members of the Imperial Organization for Social Services, and participated in the international commission of the Women's Organization of Iran.

Historian Mana Kia cited Adle's oral history testimony in her study of women's rights activism under the Pahlavi state. In the interview, Adle criticised aspects of the professionalisation of women's activism. Her comments also addressed the relationship between independent women's organisations and institutions associated with the country.

Adle also taught at Pars College and other institutions of higher education for women in Iran. During her stays in the United States, she was involved in teaching Persian language and literature.

== Personal life ==
Adle married Habib Nafisi, an engineer and government official involved in the development of technical and vocational education in Iran. Together they had three sons, Kamran, Kaveh and Kambiz.

Adle also wrote a memoir entitled Mara Beshenasid (مرا بشناسید; Learn About Me). A copy of the memoir, together with family photographs and archival documents, is preserved in the Women's Worlds in Qajar Iran digital archive at Harvard University. She was also interviewed in 1984 by Habib Ladjevardi in Cambridge, Massachusetts, for the Iranian Oral History Project at Harvard University.

== Death ==
Adle died on 11 March 2024.

Sources differ slightly regarding her year of birth. The Iranian year 1298 SH, corresponding to 1919–1920, is repeated in several Iranian biographical accounts, while Harvard's archival catalogue records her birth year as 1920. Some other published accounts give 1297 SH (1918–1919).
