= Hamid Notghi =

Iranian poet, writer and faculty (1920–1999)

- Born: 11 September 1920; Tabriz, Iran
- Died: 16 July 1999 (aged 78); United Kingdom
- Education: University of Tehran & Istanbul University Faculty of Law
- Known for: Founder and father of modern public relations in Iran
- Scientific career
- Fields: Poet, writer, author, university professor

Hamid Notghi (Persian: حمید نطقی, 1920–1999) was an Iranian poet, writer, author, university professor. Notghi was the founder and father of modern public relations in Iran.

== Literary works ==
Javad Heyat founded Varliq magazine in 1979 with Hamid Notghi. There are also many works of public relations, poetry and prose.

- One hour with Qaani
- Books management and public relations
- Beliefs and political propaganda
- Wine Road (Persian short stories)
- Of any color (Azerbaijani lyrics)
- From yesterday to today (Azerbaijani lyrics)
- End of the Millennium (Azerbaijani lyrics)

== Award of Dr. Hamid Notghi ==
International Conference on Public Relations of Iran Award of Dr. Hamid Notghithat, a scientific prize in the national and international levels in order to appreciate service, are given in the development and promotion of public relations. The most famous award winners are Mohammad Bagher Ghalibaf, a previous Mayor of Tehran, Abdollah Jassbi, a former president of Azad University, and Younes Shokrkhah.
