= Reading Lolita in Tehran =

2003 book by Azar Nafisi

- Author: Azar Nafisi
- Language: English
- Genre: Memoir
- Published: 2003
- Publisher: Random House
- Publication place: United States
- Pages: 343
- ISBN: 0375504907

Reading Lolita in Tehran: A Memoir in Books is a non-fiction book by Iranian author and academic Azar Nafisi, published in 2003. It is based on her own experiences while teaching English literature at the University of Tehran during the Iranian Revolution.

== Plot ==
The book is a memoir of Nafisi's experiences about returning to Iran during the revolution (1978–1981) and living under the Islamic Republic of Iran government until her departure in 1997. It narrates her teaching at the University of Tehran after 1979, her refusal to submit to the rule to wear the veil and her subsequent expulsion from the University, life during the Iran–Iraq War, her return to teaching at the University of Allameh Tabatabei (1981), her resignation (1987), the formation of her book club (1995–97), and her decision to emigrate. Events are interlaced with the stories of book club members consisting of seven of her female students who met weekly at Nafisi's house to discuss works of Western literature, including the controversial Lolita, and the texts are interpreted through the books they read.

=== Structure ===
The book is divided into four sections: "Lolita", "Gatsby", "James", and "Austen".

"Lolita" deals with Nafisi as she resigns from The University of Allameh Tabatabei and starts her private literature class with students Mahshid, Yassi, Mitra, Nassrin, Azin, Sanaz, and Manna. They talk not just about Lolita, but One Thousand and One Nights and Invitation to a Beheading. The main themes are oppression, jailers as revolutionary guards try to assert their authority through certain events such as a vacation gone awry and a runaway convict.

"Gatsby" is set about 11 years before "Lolita", just as the Iranian revolution starts. The reader learns how some Iranians' dreams, including the author's, became shattered through the government's imposition of new rules. Nafisi's student Mr. Nyazi puts the novel on trial, claiming it condones adultery. Chronologically, this is the first part of Nafisi's story. The Great Gatsby and Mike Gold's works are discussed in this part. The reader meets Nassrin.

Nafisi states that the Gatsby chapter is about the American dream, the Iranian dream of revolution and the way it was shattered for her; the James chapter is about uncertainty and the way totalitarian mindsets hate uncertainty; and Austen is about the choice of women, a woman at the center of the novel saying no to the authority of her parents, society, and welcoming a life of dire poverty in order to make her own choice.

"James" takes place right after "Gatsby", when the Iran–Iraq War begins and Nafisi is expelled from the University of Tehran along with a few other professors. The veil becomes mandatory and she states that the government wants to control the liberal-minded professors. Nafisi meets the man she calls her "magician", seemingly a literary academic who had retired from public life at the time of the revolution. Daisy Miller and Washington Square are the main texts. Nassrin reappears after spending several years in prison.

"Austen" succeeds "Lolita" as Nafisi plans to leave Iran and the girls discuss the issue of marriages, men and sex. The only real flashback (not counting historical background) is into how the girls and Nafisi toyed with the idea of creating a Dear Jane society. While Azin deals with an abusive husband and Nassrin plans to leave for England, Nafisi's magician reminds her not to blame all of her problems on the Islamic Republic. Pride and Prejudice, while the main focus, is used more to reinforce themes about blindness and empathy.

Throughout the book, Nafisi tackles the question of what is a hero and a villain in literature. Each independent section of the book examines notions of heroism and villainy by connecting characters from books such as Invitation to a Beheading or The Great Gatsby to others. The basis of her definition of heroism and villainy is the connection between characters who are "blind to other's problems" such as Humbert Humbert in Lolita and characters who can empathize. This theme is intertwined with that of oppression and blindness.

== Title ==
The title refers to Vladimir Nabokov's novel Lolita, a story about a middle-aged man who has a sexual relationship with a 12-year-old pubescent girl. Lolita is used by the author as a metaphor for life in the Islamic Republic of Iran. Although the book states that the metaphor is not allegorical (p. 35), Nafisi does want to draw parallels between "victim and jailer" (p. 37). The author implies that, like the principal character in Lolita, the newly formed Islamic government in Iran imposes its own "dream upon our reality, turning us into his figments of imagination." In both cases, the protagonist commits the "crime of solipsizing another person's life."

== Background ==
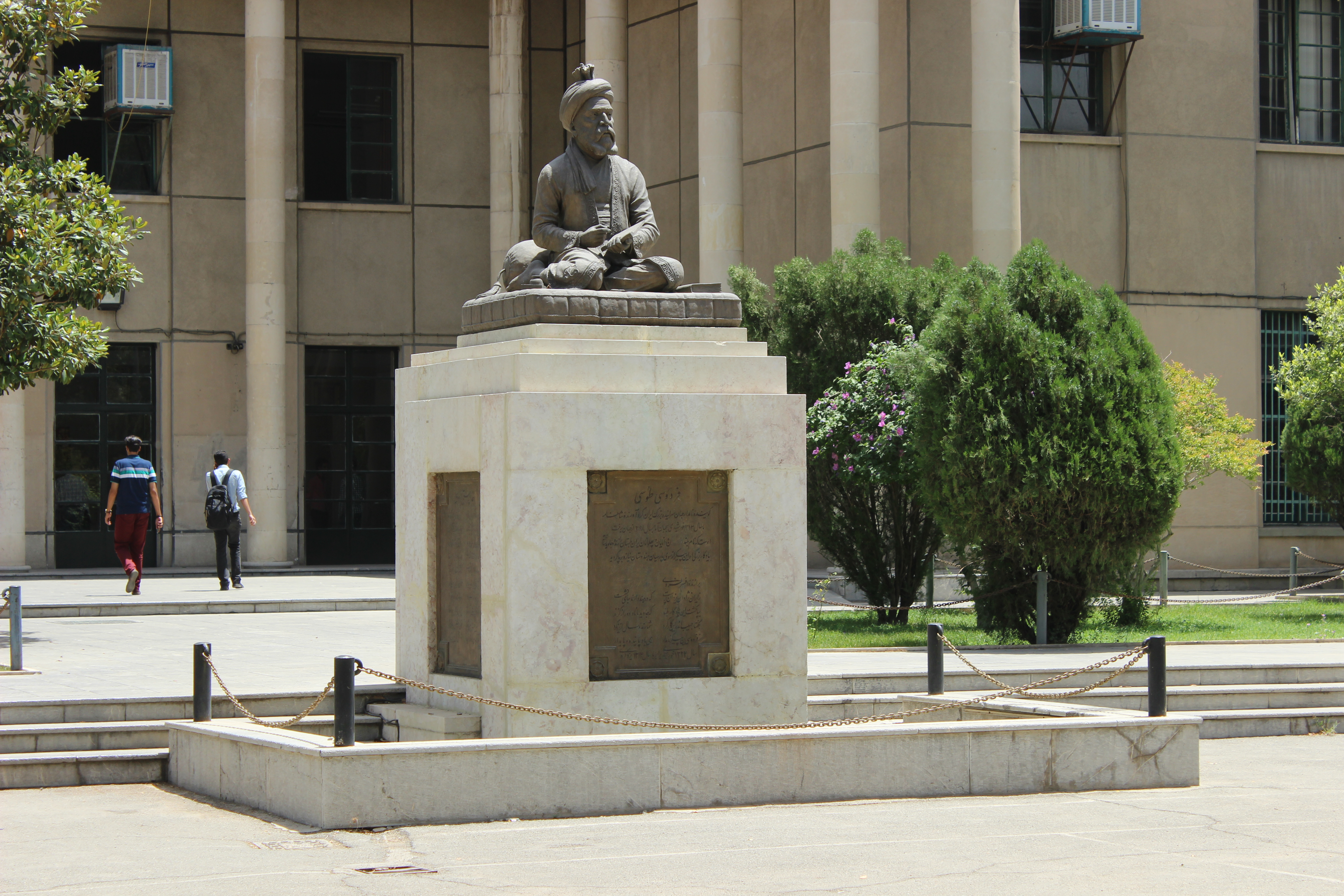
Ferdowsi Statue in Front of Literature Faculty, University of Tehran

Nafisi's account flashes back to the early days of the revolution, when she first started teaching at the University of Tehran amid the swirl of protests and demonstrations. In 1980, Nafisi claims she was dismissed from the University of Tehran for refusing to wear a veil; she subsequently pursued an independent writing career, bore two children, and, after a long hiatus from teaching, took a full-time job at Allameh Tabatabaii University where she resumed the teaching of fiction.

The book also discusses issues concerning the politics of Iran during and after the Iranian revolution, the Iran–Iraq War, and the Iranian people in general. In one instance, for example, Nafisi's students ridicule Iranian soldiers who served and died during Iran–Iraq War. She writes: "[The students] were making fun of the dead student and laughing. They joked that his death was a marriage made in heaven – didn't he and his comrades say that their only beloved was God?"

Nafisi also describes how her freedom was restricted and why she had to leave Tehran University in 1981: "I told her I did not want to wear the veil in the classroom. Did I not wear the veil, she asked, when ever I went out? Did I not wear it in the grocery store and walking down the street? It seemed I constantly had to remind people that the university was not a grocery store." Later making a compromise and accepting the veil, Nafisi came back to academia and resumed her career in Iranian universities until 1995.

The issue of the headscarf in Iranian society is a running theme in the book. In Nafisi's words: "My constant obsession with the veil had made me buy a very wide black robe with kimonolike sleeves, wide and long. I had gotten to the habit of withdrawing my hands into the sleeves and pretending that I had no hands." Ayatollah Khomeini decreed Iranian women must follow the Islamic dress code on March 7, 1979. In Nafisi's view, the headscarf was the icon of oppression in the aftermath of the revolution. In referring to Khomeini's funeral, she writes that "[t]he day women did not wear the scarf in public would be the real day of his death and the end of his revolution." The Ayatollah Khomeini had established the new regime after a referendum on March 30 and 31, 1979, in which more than 98% of the Iranian people voted for the creation of the republic. Before this revolution, Iranian women had not been obliged to wear a veil for almost 60 years; contrarily, women who did wear headscarves had been banned from most universities and could not work as government employees.

Although Nafisi criticizes the Iranian government, she also calls for self-criticism. In her speech at the 2004 National Book Festival, she declared that "[i]t is wrong to put all the blame on the Islamic regime or ... on the Islamic fundamentalists. It is important to probe and see what ... you [did] wrong to create this situation."

To The New York Times, Nafisi stated that "[p]eople from my country have said the book was successful because of a Zionist conspiracy and U.S. imperialism, and others have criticized me for washing our dirty laundry in front of the enemy."

== Release and reception ==
Published in 2003, Teaching Lolita in Tehran was on the New York Times bestseller list for over 100 weeks and has been translated into many languages.

== Adaptations ==
February 2011 saw the premiere of a concert performance of an opera based on Reading Lolita in Tehran at the University of Maryland School of Music, with music by doctoral student Elisabeth Mehl Greene and a libretto co-written by Iranian-American poet Mitra Motlagh. Nafisi was closely involved in the development of the project, and participated in an audience Q&A session after the premiere.

== Film adaptation ==
The film Reading Lolita in Tehran was presented for marketing by Zayn Williams at the Cannes Film Market in May 2023. The film was directed by award-winning Israeli director Eran Riklis, written by Marjorie David, and stars Golshifteh Farahani, Zar Amir Ebrahimi, and Mina Kavani. The film is an Italian-Israeli co-production and was shot in Italy.

Ebrahimi faced criticism from some of her Palestinian colleagues for working with Israeli filmmakers, but she emphasized that the project represents an artistic act of resistance against war. Nafisi noted that the film resonates with ongoing struggles in Iran, especially following the death of Mahsa Amini and the rise of the slogan "Woman, Life, Freedom." Nafisi stated that the film seeks to convey the message that both the Iranian and Israeli governments are driving not only their own countries but the entire region into war, and that the film underscores the message that "hate won’t work."

The film won the Audience Award and a special jury prize Rome Film Festival in October 2024.

== Criticism ==
Nafisi's memoir of her life during the revolution and the years following prompted many reactions from a wide range of perspectives—from the libertarian Reason magazine, the conservative American Enterprise, to the liberal Nation. Most critics have commended Nafisi's defiance of the norms of the oppressive government, while others have praised the book's portrayal of the subservient position and hardships experienced by women in contemporary Iran. There were also some negative reviews, appearing in the neoconservative Commentary magazine, among other publications.

Positive criticism of this readership often includes the book's depiction of great literature. For example, Margaret Atwood in her review in Amnesty magazine calls the reading "enthralling," while Heather Hewett of the Christian Science Monitor notes the book's "passionate defense of literature" that will "resonate with anyone who loves books, or who wants (or needs) to be reminded why books matter." Many comments and reviews alike note the importance of the existence of literature as a mode of refuge from tyranny and oppression, in turn giving faith to the voice of an individual. According to them, the influence of this book is two-fold. Firstly, it serves as a source of comfort for readers in hardships. Secondly, the book depicts the ways that literature speaks to readers according to the particularities of their circumstances and locations.

In a critical article published in the academic journal Comparative American Studies titled 'Reading Azar Nafisi in Tehran', Head of the North American Studies Department at University of Tehran Professor Seyed Mohammad Marandi argued that "Nafisi constantly confirms what orientalist representations have regularly claimed" and argued she "has produced gross misrepresentations of Iranian society and Islam and that she uses quotes and references which are inaccurate, misleading, or even wholly invented."

Fatemeh Keshavarz, director of the Roshan Center for Persian Studies at the University of Maryland and creator of "Windows on Iran," titled her analysis of Iranian culture "Jasmine and Stars: Reading more than Lolita in Tehran" in response to what she saw as systematic orientalism in Nafisi's book.

One of Nafisi's most active and unsparing critics is Columbia professor Hamid Dabashi, who along with other critics alleged that Nafisi expressed neoconservative sentiments. They suggested that her book informed the United States's involvement in Iran in particular, and President Bush's foreign policy goals in general. In his June 1, 2006 critical essay, "Native informers and the making of the American empire," published in the Egyptian English weekly Al-Ahram, Dabashi wrote, "By seeking to recycle a kaffeeklatsch version of English literature as the ideological foregrounding of American empire, Reading Lolita in Tehran is reminiscent of the most pestiferous colonial projects of the British in India, when for example, in 1835 a colonial officer like Thomas Macaulay decreed: 'We must do our best to form a class who may be interpreters between us and the millions whom we govern, a class of persons Indian in blood and color, but English in taste, in opinions, words and intellect.' Azar Nafisi is the personification of that native informer and colonial agent, polishing her services for an American version of the very same project."

In a subsequent interview with Z Magazine, Dabashi compared Nafisi to former American soldier Lynndie England, who was convicted of abusing Iraqi prisoners at Abu Ghraib.

Dabashi and several other scholars have also noted the ways that the simplistic portrayal of Iranian society and framing of Afghan women as helpless victims sustains momentum for U.S. intervention in the Middle East.

=== Responses to Dabashi ===
Nafisi responded to Dabashi's criticism by stating that she is not, as Dabashi claims, a neoconservative, that she opposed the Iraq War, and that she is more interested in literature than in politics. In an interview, Nafisi stated that she has never argued for an attack on Iran, and that democracy, when it comes, should come from the Iranian people (and not from U.S. military or political intervention). She added that while she is willing to engage in "serious argument... Debate that is polarized isn't worth my time." She stated that she did not respond directly to Dabashi because "You don't want to debase yourself and start calling names."

Ali Banuazizi, the co-director of Boston College’s Middle East studies program, stated that Dabashi's article was "intemperate" and that it was "not worth the attention" it had received. Marty Peretz, a writer of The New Republic also defended Nafisi against Dabashi's claims, asking rhetorically "Over what kind of faculty does [Columbia University president] Lee Bollinger preside?" Christopher Shea of the Boston Globe argued that while Dabashi spent "several thousand words...eviscerating the book," his main point was not about the specific text but rather the book's black-and-white portrayal of Iran. In an article posted on Slate.com, Gideon Lewis-Kraus described Dabashi's article as "a less-than-coherent pastiche of stock anti-war sentiment, strategic misreading, and childish calumny." Robert Fulford sharply criticized Dabashi in the National Post, arguing that "Dabashi's frame of reference veers from Joseph Stalin to Edward Said. Like a Stalinist, he tries to convert culture into politics, the first step toward totalitarianism. Like the late Edward Said, he brands every thought he dislikes as an example of imperialism, expressing the West's desire for hegemony over the downtrodden (even when oil-rich) nations of the Third World. While imitating the attitudes of Said, Dabashi deploys painful cliches."

Firoozeh Papan-Matin, Director of Persian and Iranian Studies at the University of Washington in Seattle, also criticized Dabashi's characterization of Nafisi, stating that Dabashi's accusation that Nafisi is promoting a "'kaffeeklatsch' worldview... callously ignores the extreme social and political conditions that forced Nafisi underground." Papan Matin also argued that "Dabashi’s attack is that whether Nafisi is a collaborator with the [United States]" was not relevant to the legitimate questions set forth in her book.

== Cited books ==
In the endpapers is a list of books that are discussed throughout the book. They are, in alphabetical order by author's last name:

- Baghdad Diaries by Nuha al-Radi
- The Blind Assassin by Margaret Atwood
- Emma, Mansfield Park and Pride and Prejudice by Jane Austen
- The Dean's December and More Die of Heartbreak by Saul Bellow
- Wuthering Heights by Emily Brontë
- Alice's Adventures in Wonderland by Lewis Carroll
- Under Western Eyes by Joseph Conrad
- Four Quartets by T. S. Eliot
- Shamela and Tom Jones by Henry Fielding
- The Great Gatsby by F. Scott Fitzgerald
- Madame Bovary by Gustave Flaubert
- The Diary of Anne Frank by Anne Frank
- The Ambassadors, Daisy Miller and Washington Square by Henry James
- In the Penal Colony and The Trial by Franz Kafka
- The Confidence-Man by Herman Melville
- Lolita, Invitation to a Beheading and Pnin by Vladimir Nabokov
- The Country of the Pointed Firs by Sarah Orne Jewett
- My Uncle Napoleon by Iraj Pezeshkzad
- The Language Police by Diane Ravitch
- The Net of Dreams by Julie Salamon
- Persepolis by Marjane Satrapi
- One Thousand and One Nights by Scheherazade
- The Emigrants by W.G. Sebald
- The Stone Diaries by Carol Shields
- The Engineer of Human Souls by Josef Skvorecky
- Loitering with Intent and The Prime of Miss Jean Brodie by Muriel Spark
- Confessions of Zeno by Italo Svevo
- Address Unknown by Katherine Kressman Taylor
- A Summons to Memphis by Peter Taylor
- The Adventures of Huckleberry Finn by Mark Twain
- Back When We Were Grownups and St. Maybe by Anne Tyler
- Aunt Julia and the Scriptwriter by Mario Vargas Llosa
