= Habib Nafisi =

Founder of Tehran Polytechnic (1908–1984)

Habib Nafisi (December 1908 – 1984; Persian: حبیب نفیسی) was the founder of Tehran Polytechnic (Amirkabir University of Technology) and Khaje nassir toosi University of technology. He founded it in 1958 with five engineering departments. He also founded the University of Mazandaran and Iran University of Science and Technology.

== Background ==
Habib Naficy was born in Rasht in December 1908. His father, Dr. Ali Asghar Naficy, Moadeb od Dowleh, was a well-known physician who served as the doctor and guardian of Mohammad Reza Shah Pahlavi, when as Crown Prince he attended boarding school in Switzerland. Naficy’s grandfather, Dr. Ali Akbar Naficy, Nazem al-Atebba, was a senior court physician during the Qajar Dynasty, and a medical scholar, known for having compiled the “Naficy Encyclopedia” (Fahrangeh Naficy). He also established Western-style hospitals in Tehran, Mashad, and Isfahan.

Habib Naficy received his early education in Tehran at the Ecole Saint Louis, a French Catholic School, and at the famous Dar el Fonoun School. He broke with family tradition by studying engineering at the university level, because he believed that what Iran needed most were engineers. He completed his undergraduate university education in mechanical engineering at the University of Toulouse in France, and in electrical engineering at an institute in Paris. Upon returning to Iran, he joined the Army and was sent on a government scholarship to receive practical training at a trucking company in Indianapolis, purchase armored trucks for the Iranian Army, and at the same time pursue graduate studies in mechanical engineering at Purdue University. When relations between Iran and the U.S. soured because of a diplomatic incident, he was called back and sent instead to Germany in 1936 to continue his practical training and purchase trucks for the Iranian Army. He also spent some time training in Czechoslovakia.

== Career ==
After finishing his practical training in Germany, Habib Naficy returned to Iran in 1938 to become director of a military ammunitions factory at Saltanat-Abbad in the suburbs of Tehran. He left the Army in 1943 to become Director of Labor Affairs in the Ministry of Commerce. In this position he was instrumental in drafting the first comprehensive labor laws in Iran in 1946. He was the leader of the Iranian delegation to the ILO Conference 1945 in Paris (Habib Nafici 3rd from the left, 4th Abolhassan Hakimi, 5th the famous Iranian writer Mohammad Ali Jamalzadeh).

After the establishment of Ministry of Labor in the same year, he became Undersecretary of Labor, a position he held until 1950. During this time, he tried to improve the condition of workers, and as a staunch anti-communist, he promoted the formation of non-communist labor unions as counterweight to the labor unions affiliated with the pro-communist Tudeh Party. Naficy was briefly Deputy Minister and Acting Minister of Labor in 1951 in the short-lived Hossein Ala cabinet, preceding Dr. Mossadegh’s government.

During the Mossadegh period, Habib Naficy was instrumental in establishing the Ministry of Industries and Mines, with himself serving as Undersecretary, a post he continued to hold under the Zahedi cabinet in the mid-1950s. In this position he was credited with establishing one of the first industrial estates (industrial zones) for light industries at Karaj west of Tehran.

In the late 1950s, Naficy was named Undersecretary for Technical and Vocational Education in the Ministry of Education with the mission to reinvigorate and expand that type of education, which had been initiated during the reign of Reza Shah Pahlavi. In that position he established some one hundred technical and vocational schools throughout Iran. He established the Tehran Polytechnic University (now Amir Kabir University) as well, which emphasized practical engineering education. He served as President of the institution, keeping the tuition low so that students of limited income could attend. He also established the Technical Teachers College (now Elm o Sanaat University), and the Higher Commercial College (Madresseh Aali e Bazargani), both in Tehran. During this time he taught part-time at the Faculty of Engineering of Tehran University.

In 1963, Habib Naficy was appointed Cultural Minister/Councilor, with the rank of Chargé d'Affaires, and Supervisor of Iranian Students in the United States and Canada at the Iranian Embassy in Washington, D.C., a position he held until 1966. He tried to improve services offered to Iranian students in the U.S. While in that position, he also taught part-time at the School of Engineering at the University of Maryland.

In 1966, he was once again named Undersecretary of Education for Technical and Vocational Education and President of the Tehran Polytechnic University. During this period he established about 20 Technological Institutes (technical junior colleges) in various Iranian provinces. He held these two positions until his retirement from full-time government work in 1968.

After retiring from full-time government service, he established the Naficy Technikum, a private, combined technical college and secondary technical school, which placed emphasis on practical work. He spent most of his effort in the 1970s on developing that institution. At the same time in the 1970s he was asked to serve as Undersecretary for Human Resources Development at the Ministry of Transportation, on a part-time basis. He held these two positions until the 1979 revolution.

After the revolution, Habib Naficy continued as President of the Naficy Technikum for almost a year. He was arrested in early 1980 by a group of Revolutionary Guards and Technikum staff close to them, who made charges against him (citizen arrest), although there was no government warrant for his arrest. The charges included his allegedly writing reports on dissidents while working at the Iranian Embassy in Washington, D.C., notably about Sadegh Ghotbzadeh, who was a close aide to Khomeini, and served as post-revolution head of Iranian Radio and Television and as Foreign Minister, before falling afoul of the Islamic Government and being executed in 1981. Naficy was kept in jail for ten months before being tried. Many of his former students and employees attended his trial to defend him. He was cleared of charges and released in 1981. He died in 1984. In recent years, the Islamic Government has recognized Naficy’s contributions and held a ceremony in his memory at the Amir Kabir University.

Habib Naficy is principally known for his work of drafting the first comprehensive labor laws in the 1940s, and for expanding technical education at both the secondary and university levels in the 1950s, 1960s and 1970s. He is remembered as an energetic man, dedicated to his work and to public service. He believed that technical and vocational education were key to Iran’s progress, and placed emphasis on practical, hands-on technical training. He was considered as one of Iran’s early technocrats. He served as undersecretary of various ministries for over thirty years. He was offered ministerial positions several times but turned them down, because he believed that the position of undersecretary was more stable and that he could accomplish more in such a position.

== Relatives ==
Habib Naficy came from a large, well-known Persian family. He was the brother of the late Dr. Abbas Naficy who served as Undersecretary of the Ministry of Health in the late 1940s, and Secretary General of Lion and Sun Society in the 1950s and 1960s, as well as senator in the 1960s. He was also the brother of the late Dr. Mahmonir Naficy Jazayeri, one of the first female professors at Tehran University, where she taught French Literature. He was the nephew of the late Sa’id Naficy (also Saeed Nafisi), the well-known writer and historian, and was both the nephew and first cousin of the late Eng. Fathollah Naficy, the former Vice-Chairman of the National Iranian Oil Company (NIOC). Habib Naficy was also the second cousin of Ahmad Nafisi, the mayor of Tehran in the early 1960s and father of Azar Nafisi, the author of the bestseller, Reading Lolita in Tehran. Habib Naficy was married twice. He had a son, Hossein Naficy, by his first marriage to Zarin Malak Hakimi, grand daughter of Mirza Mahmoud Hakim el Molk, daughter of Hossein Hakimi. Hossein Naficy, the father of entrepreneur Mariam Naficy, had a long and respected career as a development economist in the Middle East and Africa first with the UNDP and then for a series of firms contracted by USAID. His mother, Zarin Malak, was raised by her Aunt Belghis Hakimi (married to Prime Minister Ebrahim Hakimi Hakim el Molk) after her father's death. Zarin Malak committed suicide in 1947 by drowning herself in Rhone River where it exits Lake Geneva. Habib Naficy’s second marriage was to Dr. Ozma Adle, who was Director of Women’s Affairs at the Ministry of Labor in the late 1940s, and the translator of French literary works into Persian.

He had three children with Ozma: Kamran, Kaveh, and Kambiz. All three children have distinguished careers in their fields of endeavor. Kamran born in 1950, who currently lives in Boston, has two sons and runs a successful furniture business. Kaveh born in 1952 is a luminary in the field of leadership development. Bd coaching leveraging many of the innate leadership skills his father possessed. He has three children. He currently is living in New Jersey but soon to move to Chapel Hill North Carolina Kambiz born in 1953 is an author and spiritualist. He is a founder of a successful meditation and spirituality organization. Kambiz lives near Washington D.C., with his wife.

== Bibliography ==
- Habib Ladjevardi, Labor Unions and Autocracy in Iran, Syracuse University Press, 1985
- Habib Ladjevardi (compiler), Naficy, Habib, Harvard Iranian Oral History Project (4 tapes, available on internet), Harvard University, interview conducted in 1984.
- Habib Ladjevardi (compiler), Adl-Naficy, Ozma, Harvard Iranian Oral History Project (1 tape, available on internet), Harvard University, interview conducted in 1984.
- Morteza Dehkordi, "Habib Naficy (Founder of Amir Kabir University, Tehran Polytechnic, Iranian Technical and Vocational Education", (in Persian), Rahavard magazine, winter 2008, No. 81
- Leonard Binder, Iran: Political Development in a Changing Society, University of California Press, Berkeley and Los Angeles, 1962
- Janet Nafissi, Habib (Habibollah) Naficy, (unpublished), Wellesley, Massachusetts, 2006
- Mariam Naficy, History of the Naficy Family, (unpublished), term paper written for a course on politics and religion in Iran, (with Prof. William Darrow), Williams College, Fall Semester, 1990
