= Adl (family) =

Noble family of Iranian origin

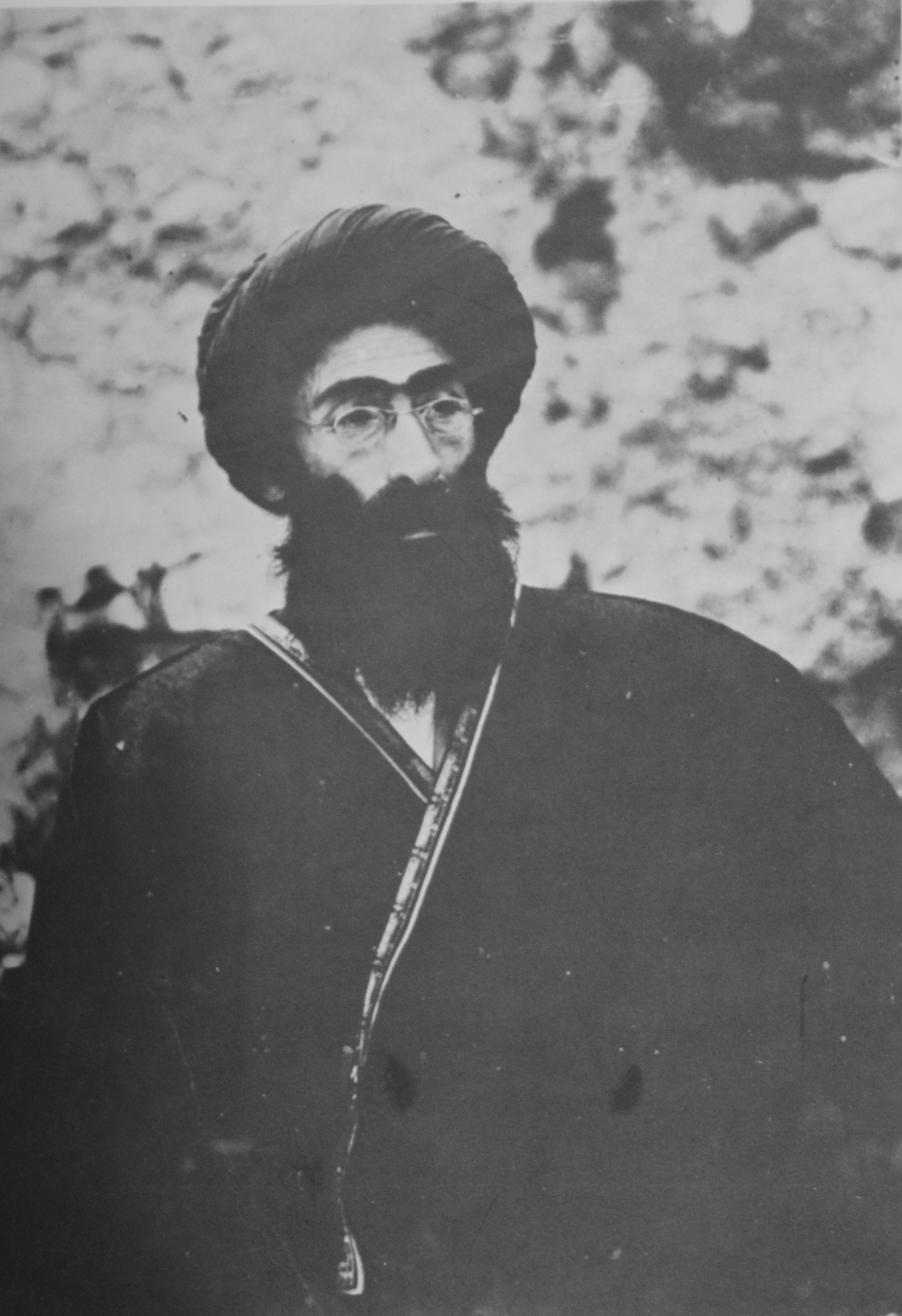
Haj Sayid Hasan Adle-ol-Molk, 1880

Adl (Persian: عدل), also spelled Adle, is a noble family of Iranian origin. The family was part of the Iranian oligarchy during the Pahlavi era and its members had significant roles in politics, judiciary and diplomacy of Iran, as well as in the development of medical fields, for more than seventy years.

Originally from Tabriz, the family descends from Hajj Seyyed Hossein (died circa 1840) also known as Hossein Shah, a wealthy merchant. His sons Seid Mirza Ebrahim Khalil and Mirza Hasan had received traditional religious training, but were enough enlightened to send their children abroad to receive modern education. Returning to Iran, they became pioneers in the modernization of the country. Mostafa Adl, son of Ebrahim Khalil, drafted the first civil code, while his cousin Pr. Yahya Adl became the first to practice modern surgery in Iran. Habib Adl, radiologist, was notable for importing cutting edge medical technologies, including X-ray medical imaging and Ahmad-Hossein Adl, Minister of Agriculture played a pivotal role in the establishment of modern industrial agriculture. The family came into prominence after the Iranian constitutional revolution, when the old aristocratic families were losing their inherited positions and were being replaced by a new generation of technocrats. The family further consolidated its position by marriages to the old affluent families, including Vali, Hedayat, Farzaneh, Mahdavi, Boushehri, Panahi, Ettehadieh, Teymourtash and Qajar nobility, including Farmanfarmaian family.

The origin of the modern family name Adl or "Adle" is from the titles of nobility given to Iranian jurists at the end of the 19th century, that were related by family ties. Notably, these jurists included Hajj Mirza Hasan whose title was Adl-ol-molk (Justice of the Kingdom), Seid Mirza Ebrahim Khalil whose title was Rokn-ol-edaleh (Pillar of Justice), and Mirza Mostafa Khan Adle whose title was Mansoor-ol-saltaneh (the Victorious of the Empire).

== Notable family members ==
- Mostafa Adl, entitled Mansoor os-Saltaneh Jurist, Minister of Justice, President University of Tehran
- Ahmad-Hossein Adl Minister of Agriculture
- Yahya Adl Surgeon

== See also ==
- Adl, an Arabic word which refers to God's divine justice

== Sources ==
- ʿĀqeli, Bāqer (2002). "ʿADLe, Aḥmad-Ḥosayn". Encyclopaedia Iranica.
