= Saeed Nafisi =

Iranian writer (1895–1966)

- سعید نفیسی
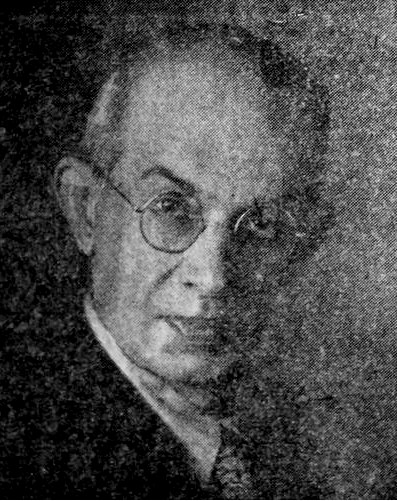
- Born: 8 June 1895; Kerman, Sublime State of Iran
- Died: 13 November 1966 (aged 71); Tehran, Imperial State of Iran
- Known for: Scholar, writer and poet
- Father: Ali Akbar Nazem al-Atebba

Saeed Nafisi (also Naficy) (Persian: سعید نفیسی; 8 June 1895 – 13 November 1966) was an Iranian scholar, fiction writer and poet. He was a prolific writer in Persian.

Nafisi was born in Tehran, where he conducted numerous research projects on Iranian culture, literature and poetry. He first emerged as a serious thinker when he joined Mohammad-Taqi Bahar, Abbas Eqbal Ashtiani, Gholamreza Rashid-Yasemi and Abdolhossein Teymourtash to found one of the first literary magazines to be published in Iran, called Daneshkade, in 1918. He subsequently published many articles on Iran, Persian literary texts and Sufism and his works have been translated into more than 20 languages worldwide. He died in a Russian hospital in Tehran.

Saeed Nafisi's relatives include Moadeb Naficy, the guardian and doctor of the Shah of Iran (Reza Pahlavi); and Moadeb's son Habib Nafisi (Naficy), a senior statesman, founder of Iran's labor laws, U.S.-Iran Attache, and founder of multiple technical universities in Tehran, Hamid Naficy, a noted scholar of Media and Cultural Studies, Siamak Naficy, an anthropologist, as well as acclaimed author, Azar Nafisi, a niece of his.

Nafisi taught in Tehran University, Kabul University, Cairo University and San José State University.

== Life ==
The son of Ali Akbar Nazem al-Atebba, who was a famous physician, Nafisi was born in 1895 in Tehran. He started his early education in a school founded by his father, and finished high school in the Eliye school, the only high school at that time. Next, at the age of 15, he went to Switzerland and continued his education at the University of Paris. After his return to Iran, he started teaching French and working in the Ministry of Welfare. Later, he also worked alongside Malek-o Shoara Bahar in a magazine.

Later, as well as teaching French in high schools, he taught in other schools, such as political and economic schools, and he also taught in the Literature faculty and Law faculty of Tehran University since its foundation. He also taught outside Iran, in Beirut, Cairo, etc.

He was a member of the Academy of Iran (Farhangestan-e Iran).

== Personality ==
He was greatly fond of books, and he spent almost all his money on books, even depriving himself of some of his other needs. He thought that books should be published and be available to people, so that people can read and learn. He used to collect everything that had a connection to books and literature. In his last years, he collected Russian books about Iran. It is said he had a hard temper, but that he had a kind heart, and he would calm down quickly. He would write honestly, which would sometimes disturb others.

== See also ==
- Persian literature
- Iranian Studies
