= Mostafa Adl =

Iranian diplomat, politician and writer (1882–1950)

Seyyed Mostafa Adl Manṣur os-Salṭaneh
- مصطفی عدل
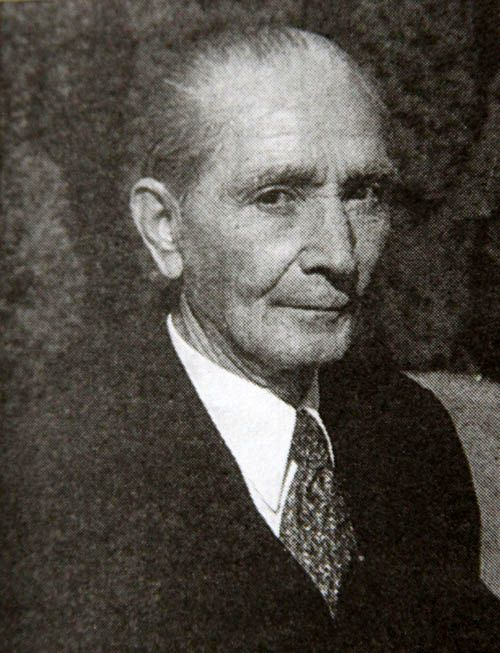

Minister of Culture
- In office 30 August 1941 – 6 August 1942
- Monarch: Mohammad Reza Shah
- Prime Minister: Mohammad Ali Foroughi; Ali Soheili
- Preceded by: Mohammad Tadayyon
- Succeeded by: Ali Akbar Siassi

Minister of Justice
- In office 13 June 1926 – 2 June 1926
- Monarch: Reza Shah
- Prime Minister: Mostowfi ol-Mamalek

Ambassador of Iran to Switzerland
- In office 1935–1939
- Preceded by: Abolhassan Foroughi
- Succeeded by: Abdullah Entezam

Personal details
- Born: 1882 Tabriz, Sublime State of Iran
- Died: 12 July 1950 (aged 68) Tehran, Imperial State of Iran
- Spouse: Mehr ol-Molouk Hedayat (Kokab od-Dowleh) (a great granddaughter of Mozaffar ad-Din Shah Qajar)
- Children: Forough ol-Zaman, Sorour ol-Zaman, Shokouh ol-Zaman, Haideh, Ardeshir
- Education: University of Paris
- Profession: Jurist, Politician

Mostafa Adl (Persian: مصطفی عدل, also known as Manṣur os-Salṭaneh (منصورالسلطنه); 1882 – 12 July 1950) was an Iranian politician, diplomat, jurist, former Ambassador of Iran to Switzerland (1935–39) and president of University of Tehran (1941–42). He led the Iranian delegation to the United Nations Conference on International Organization also known as the San Francisco Conference.

During his time as the Minister of Culture of Iran, Adl was also the president of Tehran University, since the university was controlled by the ministry of culture at the time.

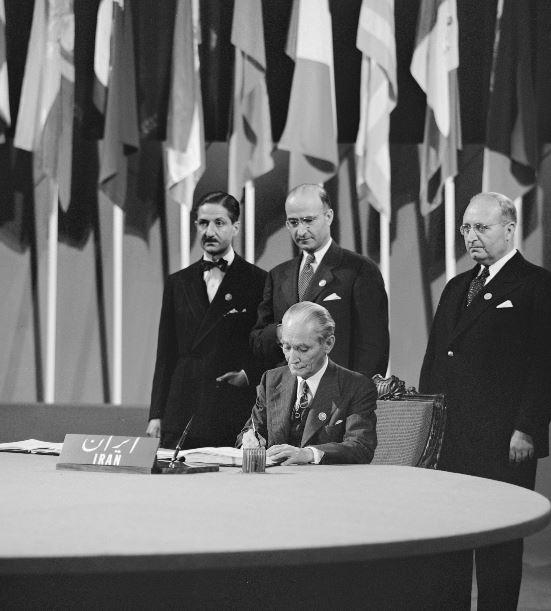
Mostafa Adl as the head of the Iranian delegation to the United Nations Conference on International Organization

== See also ==
- Adl (family)
