= A Social History of Iranian Cinema =

2011 nonfiction book by Hamid Naficy

A Social History of Iranian Cinema vols. 1-4
- 2011 Book jacket
- Author: Hamid Naficy
- Language: English
- Subject: Film, Middle East Studies, Postcolonial and Colonial Studies
- Genre: History
- Set in: Iran and multiple countries
- Published: 2011 to 2012
- Publisher: Duke University Press
- Media type: Print, E-Book
- Pages: 456
- ISBN: 9780822347545
- OCLC: 707726498
- Website: Official website Vol. 1

A Social History of Iranian Cinema is a four volume work covering Iranian cinema from the late 19th century to the early 21st century. The four volumes were released between 2011 and 2012. These volumes were written by filmmaker, writer, and scholar, Hamid Naficy and all four books were published by Duke University Press.

== Organization of the books ==
This work consists of four volumes, each covering a different period in Iranian Cinema history:

- Volume 1: The Artisanal Era, 1897–1941
- Volume 2: The Industrializing Years, 1941–1978
- Volume 3: The Islamicate Period, 1978–1984
- Volume 4: The Globalizing Era, 1984–2010

== Accolades ==
A Social History of Iranian Cinema (2012) was the winner of the Middle Eastern Studies Association's Houshang Pourshariati Iranian Studies Book Award and received an Honorable Mention for the Katherine Singer Kovács Book Award from the Society for Cinema and Media Studies. The Persian language translation of the book by Mohammad Shahba won the "Best Translation" Cinema Book Award at the 5th Annual Cinema Book Awards in Tehran, Iran, in February 2016.
