= Nezhat Nafisi =

Iranian politician (1920–2003)

Member of the National Consultative Assembly
- In office 1963–1967
- Constituency: Baft

Personal details
- Born: 1920
- Died: 2 January 2003 (aged 82–83)

Nezhat Nafisi (Persian: نزهت نفیسی, 1920 – 2 January 2003) was an Iranian politician. In 1963 she was one of the first group of women elected to the National Consultative Assembly.

== Biography ==
Born in 1920, Nafisi grew up wanting to be a medical doctor, but was not allowed to complete her education. After her first husband died, she married Ahmad Nafisi, who served as mayor of Tehran from 1961 to 1963. Their daughter Azar became a writer.

Women were granted the right to vote in 1963, and in the parliamentary elections that year, Nafisi was one of six women elected to the National Consultative Assembly.

She died on 2 January 2003.
