= Ahmad-Hossein Adl =

Iranian politician (1889–1963)

- احمدحسین عدل

Minister of Agriculture
- In office 1953–1955
- Prime Minister: Fazlollah Zahedi

Acting Director of the Department of Agriculture
- In office ?–?

Assistant Director of the Department of Agriculture
- In office ?–?

First Head of the College of Agronomy
- In office 1930–?

Personal details
- Born: 1889 Tabriz, East Azerbaijan, Sublime State of Persia
- Died: 1963 (aged 73–74) Between Isfahan and Tehran, Imperial State of Iran
- Relatives: Adl family

Ahmad-Hossein Adl (Persian: احمدحسین عدل; 1889–1963) was an Iranian politician, who served as the minister of agriculture for several periods in the Ahmad Qavam, Ebrahim Hakimi, and Fazlollah Zahedi governments. He was also the first head of the College of Agronomy. After he moved into private business later on his life, he made much effort "to advance industrial development in Isfahan".

== Biography ==
Adl was born in Tabriz to Mirza Masoud Khan Adl-ol molk, a noted figure, and a publisher of the newspaper Naseri. He travelled to France, where he studied agriculture. After returning to Iran in 1922, Adl worked in the Ministry of Public Amenities. Several years later, in 1930, he became director of the College of Agronomy, and later taught, as a faculty member, at the Faculty of Agriculture in Karaj. The Faculty of Agriculture of Karaj itself had developed out of the College of Agronomy.

Soon after the division of the Ministry of Public Amenities into three branches, "Adl "became the assistant director" of the Department of Agriculture. Adl became "acting director of the Department of Agriculture" for two years. Thereafter, Adl moved into private business (except for a brief interlude for 1,5 years as Minister of Agriculture in Fazlollah Zahedi's cabinet).

Adl eventually became "the manager of a textile factory and head of Isfahan's Chamber of Commerce". He made much effort to "advance industrial development in Isfahan".

Adl died in a car accident in 1963 "on the way from Isfahan to Tehran". The Agriculture School of Karaj was later merged into the University of Tehran.

== See also ==
- Adl (family)

== Sources ==
- ʿĀqeli, Bāqer (2002). "ʿADL, Aḥmad-Ḥosayn". Encyclopaedia Iranica.
