= Yahya Adl =

Iranian surgeon and politician (1908–2003)

- یحیی عدل
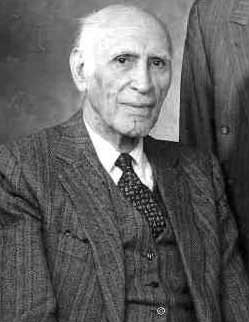
- Adl in the 1960s

Member of the Iranian Senate
- In office 1954–1979

Secretary-General of the People's Party
- In office 1972–1973
- Preceded by: Alinaghi Kani
- Succeeded by: Nasser Ameri
- In office 1960–1971
- Preceded by: Asadollah Alam
- Succeeded by: Alinaghi Kani

Personal details
- Born: 1908 Tabriz, Qajar Iran
- Died: 3 February 2003 (aged 95) Tabriz, Iran
- Party: People's Party
- Spouse: Fernande Tellier
- Children: 2
- Relatives: Ozma Adle
- Profession: Surgeon
- Nickname: Father of Modern Surgery in Iran

Yahya Adl (Persian: یحیی عدل; also romanized as Yahyā ’Adl; 1908 – 3 February 2003) was a prominent Iranian surgeon, known as "Professor Adl". He is honored as the Father of Modern Surgery in Iran.

== See also ==
- Adl (family)

== Notes ==
Party political offices
Preceded by Asadollah Alam	Secretary-General of the People's Party; 1960–1971; 1972–1973	Alinaghi Kani
Preceded by Alinaghi Kani	Secretary-General of the People's Party; 1960–1971; 1972–1973	Succeeded by Nasser Ameri
