= Javad Heyat =

Iranian surgeon and writer (1925–2014)

- Born: 24 May 1925; Tabriz, Iran
- Died: 12 August 2014 (aged 89); Baku, Azerbaijan
- Education: Istanbul University
- Scientific career
- Fields: Surgery, writing

Javad Heyat (Persian: جواد هیئت; 25 May 1925 – 12 August 2014) was an Iranian surgeon and writer. He performed the first open heart surgery in Iran and was Ayatollah Khamenei's personal physician when the latter was President of Iran in the 1980s. Heyat was the publisher and founding editor of Varliq, which he established in 1979 in Tehran. He was the recipient of numerous honorary degrees from universities in Turkey and the Republic of Azerbaijan.

== Biography ==
Javad Heyat was born in 1925 in Tabriz, northwestern Iran, and belonged to an aristocratic Iranian Azerbaijani family. His father, Ali Heyat, was Chief Justice under the Pahlavi dynasty. Javad attended elementary and secondary school in Tabriz, and subsequently moved to the capital Tehran where he attended medical school. He then attended medical school abroad, first in Istanbul and then Paris in order to specialize in cardiology. Back in the Iranian capital Tehran, Heyat pursued a remarkable medical career at Hedayat hospital, where he performed the first open heart surgery in Iran. Javad Heyat was the author of over 80 articles in Persian and 20 articles in English and French for medical journals. Following the Islamic Revolution (1979), he became professor of surgery at Islamic Azad University in Tehran where he published three surgery manuals. He simultaneously wrote several books on the history of and language of Iran's historic Azerbaijan region. In 1983, Heyat briefly moved to the United States in order to participate in the first Conference of Turkic studies at the University of Indiana. There, Heyat presented a paper which dealt with the Azeri Turkish language and literature, before and after the Revolution. Heyat was the recipient of numerous honorary degrees from universities in Turkey and the Republic of Azerbaijan: University of Medicine in Istanbul, Medical School of the Republic of Azerbaijan, Turkish Language Academy in Ankara, Academy of the Republic of Azerbaijan. He also was Ayatollah Khamenei's personal physician when the latter was President of Iran (1981–1989).

According to Gilles Riaux, Heyat was a "leading figure in the Iranian medical community", and a "recognized expert on Turkish affairs, in Ankara and elsewhere".

== Criticism ==
Heyat was a pan-Turkist. He held a Turkish nationalistic position in his academic writings on history and literature. In his works, he claimed that Persian poet Nizami Ganjavi was Turkish.

== Sources ==
- Kamrava, Mehran, ed. (2017). The Great Game in West Asia: Iran, Turkey and the South Caucasus. Oxford University Press. p. 294 (note 68). ISBN 978-0190869663.
- Lornejad, Siavash; Doostzadeh, Ali (2012). Arakelova, Victoria; Asatrian, Garnik (eds.). On the modern politicization of the Persian poet Nezami Ganjavi (PDF). Caucasian Centre for Iranian Studies. Archived from the original (PDF) on 2022-09-14.
- Riaux, Gilles (2018). "The Origins of the Protest Movement Against Ethnic Hierarchy: The Azerbaijani Cause in Iran". In Dorronsoro, Gilles; Grojean, Olivier (eds.). Identity, Conflict and Politics in Turkey, Iran and Pakistan. Oxford University Press. ISBN 978-0190934682.
