= Ahmad Nafisi =

Iranian bureaucrat (1919–2004)

Mayor of Tehran
- In office 22 May 1962 – November 1963
- Monarch: Mohammad Reza Pahlavi
- Prime Minister: Ali Amini

Personal details
- Born: 1919
- Died: 2004 (aged 84–85)
- Spouse: Nezhat Nafisi
- Children: Azar Nafisi
- Education: University of Tehran; American University
- Awards: Legion of Honour

Ahmad Nafisi (Persian: احمد نفیسی; 1919–2004) was an Iranian bureaucrat who briefly served as the mayor of Tehran between 1962 and 1963 and as director of the plan organization. His career abruptly ended in 1963 when he was jailed. He was released from prison in 1967 after he was cleared of all charges.

== Biography ==
Nafisi was born in 1919. He graduated from the University of Tehran and then from American University in Washington, D.C.

On 22 May 1962 Nafisi was appointed by Prime Minister Ali Amini as the mayor of Tehran. During his term French President Charles de Gaulle visited Tehran and awarded Nafisi with the Legion of Honour medal. The French magazine Paris Match featured President de Gaulle and Nafisi following the visit. Nafisi organized and hosted the opening meeting of the newly established association, Congress of Free Man and Women, on 27 August 1963.

Nafisi was arrested in November 1963 and jailed for his alleged involvement in activities against the rule of the Shah Mohammad Reza Pahlavi and for corruption claims. It was also claimed that Nafisi had relations with the rebellious clergy. He was found not guilty and was released from prison in 1967. Michael Axworthy argued that his imprisonment was a result of the Prime Minister Hassan Ali Mansur's jealousy of Nafisi.

Nafisi married Nezhat Nafisi, and they had a daughter, Azar. He died in 2004.
