= Azar Nafisi =

Iranian-American writer and professor

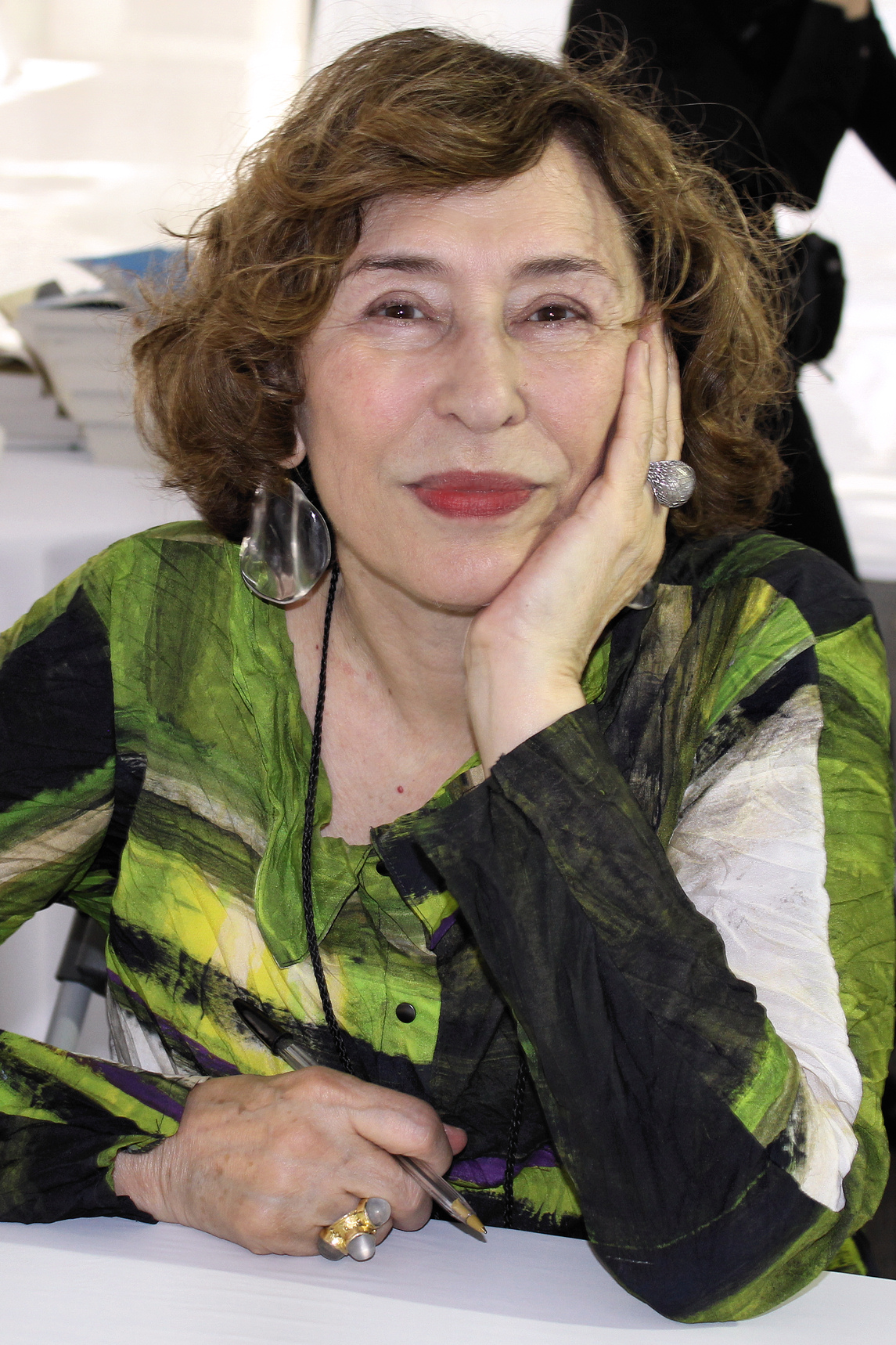
- Nafisi at the 2015 Texas Book Festival.
- Born: Persian: آذر نفیسی; Tehran, Imperial State of Iran
- Citizenship: American
- Education: University of Oklahoma
- Occupations: Writer, professor
- Writing career
- Language: English
- Notable work: Reading Lolita in Tehran: A Memoir in Books
- Notable awards: 2004 Non-fiction Book of the Year Award (Booksense), Persian Golden Lioness Award

Azar Nafisi (Persian: آذر نفیسی) is an Iranian-American writer and professor of English literature. Born in Tehran, Iran, she has resided in the United States since 1997 and became a U.S. citizen in 2008.

Nafisi has held several academic leadership roles, including director of the Johns Hopkins University's School of Advanced International Studies (SAIS) Dialogue Project and Cultural Conversations, a Georgetown Walsh School of Foreign Service, Centennial Fellow, and a fellow at Oxford University.

Nafisi is best known for her 2003 book Reading Lolita in Tehran: A Memoir in Books, which remained on The New York Times Best Seller list for 117 weeks. In 2024 it was adapted into a film. Nafisi also authored Things I've Been Silent About: Memories of a Prodigal Daughter, The Republic of Imagination: America in Three Books and That Other World: Nabokov and the Puzzle of Exile. Read Dangerously: The Subversive Power of Literature in Troubled Times was published on 8 March 2022. She has won several literary awards.

== Early life and education ==
Azar Nafisi was born in Tehran, Iran. She is the daughter of Nezhat and Ahmad Nafisi, the former mayor of Tehran from 1961 to 1963. He was the youngest man ever appointed to the post at that time. In 1963, her mother was a member of the first group of women elected to the National Consultative Assembly. Nafisi is the niece of Iranian scholar, fiction writer, and poet Saeed Nafisi.

Nafisi was raised in Tehran, but when she was 13, she moved to Lancaster, England, to finish her studies. She then moved to Switzerland before returning to Iran briefly in 1963. (Note: Following eighth grade, Nafisi's parents sent her to England for schooling from 1961 to 1963. Nafisi 2010, chapter 8, pp. 69-70; chapter 13, p. 115) She completed her degree in English and American literature and received her Ph.D. from the University of Oklahoma.

== Career ==
Nafisi returned to Iran in 1979 after the Iranian Revolution, and taught English literature at the University of Tehran. In 1981, she was expelled from the university for refusing to wear the mandatory Islamic veil.

Years later, during a period of liberalization, she began teaching at Allameh Tabataba'I University. In 1995, Nafisi sought to resign from her position, but the university did not accept her resignation. After repeatedly not going to work, they eventually expelled her, but refused her ability to resign.

From 1995 to 1997, Nafisi invited several female students to attend regular meetings at her house every Thursday morning. They discussed their place as women within post-revolutionary Iranian society. They studied literary works, including some considered "controversial" by the regime, such as Lolita alongside other works such as Madame Bovary. She also taught novels by F. Scott Fitzgerald, Henry James, and Jane Austen, attempting to understand and interpret them from a modern Iranian perspective.

After staying in Iran for 18 years after the Revolution, Nafisi returned to the United States in June 1997.

=== Literary and academic work ===
External videos
- Booknotes interview with Nafisi on Reading Lolita in Tehran, June 8, 2003, C-SPAN
- Presentation by Nafisi on Reading Lolita in Tehran, August 3, 2004, C-SPAN
- After Words interview with Nafisi on Things I've Been Silent About, February 28, 2009, C-SPAN
- Presentation by Nafisi on The Republic of Imagination, November 23, 2014, C-SPAN

In addition to her books, Nafisi has written for The New York Times The Washington Post, The Guardian, and The Wall Street Journal. Her cover story, "The Veiled Threat: The Iranian Revolution's Woman Problem," published in The New Republic (February 22, 1999) has been reprinted in several languages. She also wrote the new introduction to the Modern Library Classics edition of Tolstoy's Hadji Murad, as well as the introduction to Iraj Pezeshkzad's My Uncle Napoleon, published by Modern Library (April 2006). She has published a children's book (with illustrator Sophie Benini Pietromarchi) BiBi and the Green Voice (translated into Italian, as BiBi e la voce verde, and Hebrew).

Nafisi has held several academic leadership roles, including director of the Johns Hopkins University's School of Advanced International Studies (SAIS) Dialogue Project and Cultural Conversations, a Georgetown Walsh School of Foreign Service, Centennial Fellow.

In 2003, Nafisi published Reading Lolita in Tehran: A Memoir in Books. The book describes her experiences as a secular woman living and working in the Islamic Republic of Iran right after the Revolution. In 2008, Nafisi authored a memoir about her mother titled Things I've Been Silent About: Memories of a Prodigal Daughter.

On October 21, 2014, Nafisi authored The Republic of Imagination: America in Three Books, in which using The Adventures of Huckleberry Finn, Babbitt, and The Heart Is a Lonely Hunter, as well as the writings of James Baldwin and many others, Nafisi responds to an Iranian reader that questioned whether Americans care about or need their literature.

In 2019, the English translation of That Other World: Nabokov and the Puzzle of Exile was published by Yale University Press. Nafisi's subsequent book, Read Dangerously: The Subversive Power of Literature in Troubled Times was published on March 8, 2022.

Nafisi has lectured and written extensively in English and Persian on the political implications of literature and culture. She often writes about totalitarian tendencies in both Iran and the U.S. She has been consulted on issues related to Iran and human rights by policymakers and various national and international human rights organizations.

== Critical response ==
Nafisi's books have received critical acclaim from authors, publishing houses, and newspapers.

Reading Lolita in Tehran (2003)

Michiko Kakutani described Reading Lolita in Tehran in The New York Times Book Review as "resonant and deeply affecting… an eloquent brief on the transformative powers of fiction-- on the refuge from ideology that art can offer to those living under tyranny, and art's affirmative and subversive faith in the voice of the individual". Stephen Lyons for USA Today called the book "an inspiring account of an insatiable desire for intellectual freedom in Iran," and Publishers Weekly said of Reading Lolita, "This book transcends categorization as memoir, literary criticism or social history, though it is superb as all three." Kirkus Reviews called Reading Lolita, "A spirited tribute both to the classics of world literature and to resistance against oppression."

Margaret Atwood, author of The Handmaid's Tale, reviewed Nafisi's book for the Literary Review of Canada, stating that, "Reading Lolita in Tehran is both a fascinating account of how she arrived at this belief and a stunning dismissal of it. All readers should read it. As for writers, it reminds us, with great eloquence, that our words may travel farther and say more than we could ever guess when we wrote them."

Things I've Been Silent About (2008)

After reviewing Things I've Been Silent About, The New York Times Book Review called Nafisi "a gifted storyteller with a mastery of Western literature, Nafisi knows how to use the language both to settle scores and to seduce". Kirkus Reviews called the book "an immensely rewarding and beautifully written act of courage, by turns amusing, tender and obsessively dogged".

The Republic of Imagination: America in Three Books (2014)

Iranian French novelist Marjane Satrapi's review of The Republic of Imagination, says, "We are all citizens of Azar Nafisi's Republic of Imagination. Without imagination, there are no dreams; without dreams, there is no art; without art, there is nothing. Her words are essential."

Kirkus Reviews said the book is "a passionate argument for returning to key American novels to foster creativity and engagement… Literature, writes Nafisi, is deliciously subversive because it fires the imagination and challenges the status quo… Her literary exegesis lightly moves through her experience as a student, teacher, friend, and new citizen. Touching on myriad examples, from L. Frank Baum to James Baldwin, her work is poignant and informative."

Jane Smiley wrote in The Washington Post that Nafisi "finds the essence of the American experience, filtered through narratives not about exceptionalism or fabulous success, but alienation, solitude and landscape". Laura Miller of Salon wrote that "No one writes better or more stirringly about the way books shape a reader's identity, and about the way that talking books with good friends becomes integral to how we understand the books, our friends and ourselves.

She appeared on Late Night with Seth Meyers, and PBS NewsHour to promote the book.

That Other World: Nabokov and the Puzzle of Exile (2019)

American literary critic Gary Saul Morson described That Other World as "somewhere between a first-person encounter with literature and a critical study; this book reminds us of how meaningful literature can be".

Read Dangerously: The Subversive Power of Literature in Troubled Times (2022)

Publishers Weekly authored a starred review of Nafisi's forthcoming Read Dangerously, calling it a "stunning look at the power of reading" and characterizing Nafisi's prose as "razor-sharp". The Progressive Magazine printed that Read Dangerously lives up to its audacious title, demonstrating the subversive and transformative power of literature. It should start many a book-based conversation among the living and the dead."

Reading Lolita in Tehran, Film (2024)

The Atlantic said in a January 2025 review, that the "film and book avoid didacticism. And in doing so, they demonstrate exactly the point Nafisi explores with her students, which is the power of literature to stir empathy across seemingly unbridgeable divides." Variety described the film as "a respectable, aptly rebellious and deeply feminine exercise."

=== Political influences ===
In a 2003 article for The Guardian, Brian Whitaker criticized Nafisi for working for the public relations firm Benador Associates which he argued promoted the neo-conservative ideas of creative destruction and total war.

In 2004, Christopher Hitchens wrote that Nafisi had dedicated Reading Lolita in Tehran to Paul Wolfowitz, the United States Deputy Secretary of Defense under George W. Bush and a principal architect of the Bush Doctrine. Hitchens had stated that Nafisi was good friends with Wolfowitz and several other key figures in the Bush administration. Nafisi later responded to Hitchen's comments, neither confirming nor denying the claim.

In a critical article in the academic journal Comparative American Studies, titled Reading Azar Nafisi in Tehran, University of Tehran literature professor Seyed Mohammad Marandi states that "Nafisi constantly confirms what orientalist representations have regularly claimed". He also claimed that she "has produced gross misrepresentations of Iranian society and Islam and that she uses quotes and references which are inaccurate, misleading, or even wholly invented."

John Carlos Rowe, Professor of the Humanities at the University of Southern California, states that: "Azar Nafisi's Reading Lolita in Tehran: A Memoir in Books (2003) is an excellent example of how neo-liberal rhetoric is now being deployed by neo-conservatives and the importance they have placed on cultural issues." He also states that Nafisi is "amenable... to serving as a non-Western representative of a renewed defense of Western civilization and its liberal promise, regardless of its historical failures to realize those ends."

=== Hamid Dabashi: criticisms and counter-criticisms ===
In 2006, Columbia University professor Hamid Dabashi, in an essay published in the Cairo-based, English-language paper Al-Ahram (Dabashi's criticism of Nafisi became a cover story for an edition of the Chronicle of Higher Education) compared Reading Lolita in Tehran to "the most pestiferous colonial projects of the British in India," and asserted that Nafisi functions as a "native informer and colonial agent" whose writing has cleared the way for an upcoming exercise of military intervention on the Middle East. He also labeled Nafisi as a "comprador intellectual," a comparison to the "treasonous" Chinese employees of mainland British firms, who sold out their country for commercial gain and imperial grace. In an interview Z magazine, he classed Nafisi with the U.S. soldier convicted of mistreating prisoners at Abu Ghraib: "To me, there is no difference between Lynndie England and Azar Nafisi." Finally, Dabashi stated that the book's cover image (which appears to be two veiled teenage women reading Lolita in Tehran) is in fact, in a reference to the September 11 attacks, "Orientalised pedophilia" designed to appeal to "the most deranged Oriental fantasies of a nation already petrified out of its wits by a ferocious war waged against the phantasmagoric Arab/Muslim male potency that has just castrated the two totem poles of U.S. empire in New York."

Critics like Dabashi have accused Nafisi of having close relations with neoconservatives. Nafisi responded to Dabashi's criticism by stating that she is not, as Dabashi claims, a neoconservative, that she opposed the Iraq war, and that she is more interested in literature than politics. In an interview, Nafisi stated that she has never argued for an attack on Iran and that democracy, when it comes, should come from the Iranian people (and not from US military or political intervention). She added that while she is willing to engage in "serious argument...The polarized debate isn't worth my time." She said she did not respond directly to Dabashi because "You don't want to debase yourself and start calling names." In the acknowledgements she makes in Reading Lolita in Tehran, Nafisi writes of Princeton University historian Bernard Lewis as "one who opened the door". Nafisi, who opposed the U.S. invasion of Iraq in 2003, rejects such accusations as "guilt by association", noting that she has both "radical friends" and "conservative friends." Ali Banuazizi, the co-director of Boston College’s Middle East studies program, stated that Dabashi's article was very "intemperate" and that it was "not worth the attention" it had received. Christopher Shea of The Boston Globe argued that while Dabashi spent "several thousand words... eviscerating the book," his main point was not about the specific text but the book's black-and-white portrayal of Iran.

Writing in The New Republic, Marty Peretz sharply criticized Dabashi, and rhetorically asked, "Over what kind of faculty does [Columbia University president] Lee Bollinger preside?" In an article posted on Slate.com, author Gideon Lewis-Kraus described Dabashi's article as "a less-than-coherent pastiche of stock anti-war sentiment, strategic misreading, and childish calumny" and that Dabashi "insists on seeing [the book] as political perfidy" which allows him "to preserve his fantasy that criticizing Nafisi makes him a usefully engaged intellectual." Robert Fulford sharply criticized Dabashi's comments in the National Post, arguing that "Dabashi's frame of reference veers from Joseph Stalin to Edward Said. Like a Stalinist, he tries to convert culture into politics, the first step toward totalitarianism. Like the late Edward Said, he brands every thought he dislikes as an example of imperialism, expressing the West's desire for hegemony over the oppressed (even when oil-rich) nations of the Third World." Fulford added that "While imitating the attitudes of Said, Dabashi deploys painful clichés." Firoozeh Papan-Matin, the Director of Persian and Iranian Studies at the University of Washington in Seattle, stated that Dabashi's accusation that Nafisi is promoting a "'kaffeeklatsch' worldview... callously ignores the extreme social and political conditions that forced Nafisi underground." Papan Matin also argued that "Dabashi's attack is that whether Nafisi is a collaborator with the [United States]" was not relevant to the legitimate questions outlined in her book.

== Recognition and awards ==
Nafisi has won numerous awards for her writing and ideas, and several honorary doctorates.

In 2011, she was awarded the Cristóbal Gabarrón Foundation International Thought and Humanities Award for her "determined and courageous defense of human values in Iran and her efforts to create awareness through literature about the situation women face in Islamic society".

She also received the 2015 Benjamin Franklin Creativity Laureate Award.

Honorary Degrees

- Salve Regina University (2023)
- Susquehanna University (2019)
- Pomona College (2015)
- Mount Holyoke College (2012)
- Seton Hill University (2010)
- Goucher College (2009)
- Bard College (2007)
- Rochester University (2005)
- Nazareth College (2005)

Selected Awards

- Blue Metropolis Words to Change Prize (2026)
- Pell Center Prize for Story in the Public Square (2023)
- Matilde Serão Award Recipient (2018)
- Benjamin Franklin Creativity Laureate Award (2015)
- Carnegie Corporation of New York, 2015 Distinguished Immigrants List (2015)
- Cristóbal Gabarrón Foundation International Thought and Humanities Award (2011)
- The Don and Arvonne Fraser Human Rights Award (2010)
- The Elizabeth Ann Seton Woman of Courage Award (2010)
- Distinguished Alumnus Award, University of Oklahoma (2001)

Literary Awards

- Taobuk Award for Literary Excellence (Taormina, Italy) (2023)
- The Times (London), “100 Best Books of the Decade” for Reading Lolita in Tehran (2009)
- Persian Golden Lioness Award for literature, presented by the World Academy of Arts, Literature, and Media (2006)
- Frederic W. Ness Book Award (2005)
- The Book Standard Bestsellers Award (2005)
- Grand Prix des Lectrices d’ Elle (2005)
- Achievement award from the American Immigration Law Foundation (2005)
- Prix du Meilleur Livre Étranger (2004)
- Non-fiction Book of the Year Award from Booksense (2004)
- Latifeh Yarsheter Book Award (2004)
- Encyclopædia Iranica Award for Literature (2004)

== Personal life ==
Nafisi became a U.S. citizen in 2008.

== Works ==
Books

- Anti-Terra: A Critical Study of Vladimir Nabokov’s Novels (1994).
- Reading Lolita in Tehran (Random House, 2003).
- "BiBi e la voce verde" (Adelphi, 2006)
- Things I've Been Silent About (Random House, 2008).
- The Republic of Imagination (Random House, 2014).
- That Other World: Nabokov and the Puzzle of Exile (Yale University Press, 2019). Translated from Persian by Lotfali Khonji.
- Read Dangerously: The Subversive Power of Literature in Troubled Times (Dey Street Books, 2022)

Forewords, Introductions, and Afterwords

- Introduction, Hadji Murad by Leo Tolstoy (Penguin Random House, 2003)
- Introduction, My Uncle Napoleon by Iraj Pezeshkzad (Penguin Random House, 2006)
- Foreword, The Adventures of Huckleberry Finn by Mark Twain (Penguin Classics, 2014)
- Afterword, Babbitt by Sinclair Lewis (Signet Classics, 2015)
- Foreword, Shahnameh by Abolqasem Ferdowsi (Penguin Random House, translated by Dick Davis, 2016)

Essays and Chapters in Edited Collections

- "Images of Women in Classical Persian Literature and the Contemporary Iranian Novel." The Eye of the Storm: Women in Post-Revolutionary Iran. Ed. Mahnaz Afkhami and Erika Friedl. New York: Syracuse University Press, 1994. 115–30.
- "Imagination as Subversion: Narrative as a Tool of Civic Awareness." Muslim Women and the Politics of Participation. Ed. Mahnaz Afkhami and Erika Friedl. New York: Syracuse University Press, 1997. 58–71.
- "Tales of Subversion: Women Challenging Fundamentalism in the Islamic Republic of Iran." Religious Fundamentalisms and the Human Rights of Women (1999).
- "All That Remains," Last Folio: A Photographic Memory (2015).
- "The Library By The Morgue," The Library: An Open Book (2025).

== See also ==
- List of Iranian women in academia

== Bibliography ==
- Nafisi, Azar. 2010 (2008). Things I've been silent about. Random House Trade Paperbacks. (Originally published 2008)
