= Nazem al-Atebba =

Iranian physician and scholar (1847–1924)

Mirza Ali Akbar Khan Nafisi Nazem al-Atebba
- میرزا علی‌اکبرخان نفیسی
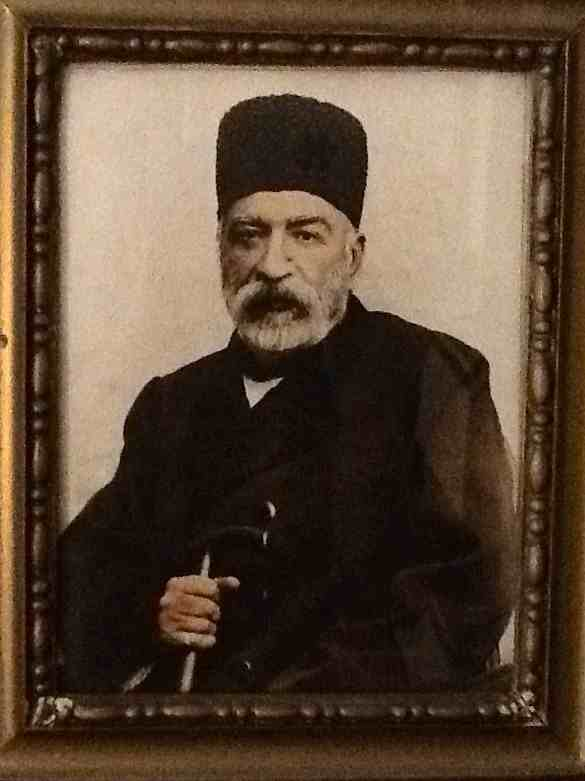
- Born: 12 March 1847; Kerman, Sublime State of Iran
- Died: 14 June 1924 (aged 77); Tehran, Imperial State of Iran
- Citizenship: Iranian
- Education: Dar ul-Funun
- Occupations: Physician, scholar
- Era: Qajar era, Pahlavi era
- Notable work: Farhang-e Nafisi Persian Lexicon
- Children: 6, including Ali-Asghar Nafisi, Saeed Nafisi
- Father: Mirza Hassan Tabib Kermani

Mirza Ali Akbar Khan Nafisi (Persian: میرزا علی‌اکبرخان نفیسی; 12 March 1847 – 14 June 1924), known mononymously as Nazem al-Atebba (ناظم‌الاطباء, lit. 'superintendent of physicians'), was an Iranian physician, scholar, and one of the most prominent doctors of the late Qajar era. He served as a personal physician to Mozaffar ad-Din Shah and was an influential figure in persuading the Shah to sign the Constitutional Decree of Iran.

Nazem al-Atebba played a crucial role in establishing several European-style hospitals in Tehran and Mashhad. He was also one of the founders of the first assembly of experts for health, Majles-e Hefz-e Sehhat (مجلس حفظ‌الصحة; lit. Health Preservation Council) in Iranian history.

He authored numerous medical works, and his most notable non-medical achievement is a comprehensive four-volume Persian lexicon, widely known as Farhang-e Nazem al-Atebba or Farhang-e Nafisi. He was also the father of the renowned scholar, Saeed Nafisi.

== Early life and education ==
Nafisi was born on 12 March 1847 (17 Rabi al-Thani 1263 AH) in Kerman. His father, Mirza Hassan Tabib Kermani, like his ancestors, practiced medicine. His family, known as the Nafisi family of Kerman, had been involved in medical science for several centuries, with their lineage tracing back to Burhan-ud-din Kermani, one of the most famous physicians of the 15th century and a court physician for Ulugh Beg.

Nafisi completed his early education in Kerman, learning the basics of sciences and medicine from his father and other doctors of the time. However, due to his natural inclination and talent, he was more interested in philosophy and theology. The governor of Kerman, Mohammad Ismail Khan Vakil al-Molk (known as Vakil al-Molk I), recognizing Mirza Ali Akbar's potential, encouraged him to pursue medical studies.

In 1865, at the age of 19, he moved to Tehran and enrolled in the Dar ul-Funun to study medicine under Joseph Désiré Tholozan. His talent and dedication were such that he was soon selected as an assistant to his professors. In 1868, while still a student at Dar ul-Funun, he was chosen to serve as a physician for the Engineering Corps of the army.

During a time when famine and various diseases had spread through Tehran In 1871, Nafisi made significant efforts to treat the sick and spent four months working at the Tehran State Hospital, serving the poor. Finally in 1872, he graduated from his medical studies.

== Career ==
After returning from his first trip to Europe in 1873, Naser al-Din Shah Qajar decided to establish a hospital in Tehran modeled on European institutions. He chose Nafisi to lead this project. Until 1881, Nafisi was in charge of this hospital, known as the Marikhaneh dolati (مریضخانه دولتی; lit. State Hospital), and for this, he earned the title of Hakim Bashi (حکیم‌باشی; lit. Chief Physician). Later in 1876, he also played a role alongside Joseph Désiré Tholozan in forming the first assembly of experts for health or Majles-e Hefz-e Sehhat in Tehran.

Nafisi accompanied Mirza Hossein Khan Sepahsalar (the governor of Khorasan and custodian of the Astan Quds Razavi) to Mashhad in 1881; Under Sepahsalar's orders, Nafisi renovated the Mashhad Hospital which had fallen into disrepair, following European hospital principles. In recognition of his services during this mission, he was awarded the rank of Sartip (equivalent to Brigadier General).

He also founded the Sharaf School (مدرسه شرف) in 1897, which he ran until 1906 without financial compensation. He covered most of the school's expenses, running it in a modern manner.

== Personal life ==
Nazem al-Atebba first married a woman from the Dowlatshahi family, descendants of Mohammad-Ali Mirza Dowlatshah, who died at a young age, leaving him with two children. One of the children died in infancy, and the other, Ali-Asghar Nafisi, later became the first Minister of Health in Iran. His second wife also died young and did not leave any children. His third wife, Jalileh Jamal al-Dowleh, came from the Khajeh Nouri family and, through her mother, was the granddaughter of Mirza Fath-Allah Nouri, the nephew of Mirza Aqa Khan Nuri.

Jalileh Khanom had four sons and two daughters. The eldest was Saeed Nafisi, a renowned scholar. His daughters were Tourandokht and Hamdam ol-Molouk, and his other sons were Ezatollah, Hossein Musharraf Nafisi (Mosharraf al-Dowleh) and Fath-Allah Nafisi.

On Monday 9 June 1924 (26 Dhu al-Qi'dah 1342 AH), he died in Tehran at the age of 79 after several days of illness due to dysentery.

== Literary works ==
In addition to spending fifty-seven years treating patients day and night, a duty he continued even when he was frail in his later years, Nazem al-Atebba devoted any free time he had to writing and translating (from French) in his field and in other sciences.

Some of his works include:

- A book on Anatomy (کتابی در علم تشریح ), his first book and the first translation from French, completed on the night of February 14, 1888, in the village of Shahreza near Esfahan. All his later works were written after this date.
- A book on Pathology and Clinical Surgery (کتابی در پاتولوژی و کلینیک جراحی).
- A treatise on Physics (رساله‌ای در فیزیک).
- A treatise on Surgery (رساله‌ای در جراحی).
- A treatise on Therapeutics (رساله‌ای در تراپوتیک).
- Another treatise on Anatomy (رساله‌ای دیگر در تشریح).
- Two treatises on Indigestion (دو رساله در سوء هضم).
- Negotiations (مذاکرات), a book modeled after the French physician Auguste Corlieu’s Aide-Mémoire, completed by Nazem al-Atebba in 1889.
- Medical Encyclopedia (پزشکی‌نامه ) a large book in 957 folios covering Therapeutics and Materia Medica, completed in December 1896, which became a reference for Iranian physicians and pharmacists during the late Qajar and early Pahlavi periods.
- Booklet of Language Learning (نامهٔ زبان‌آموز) on Persian grammar.
- Treatise on the Last Cholera Outbreak (رساله در آخرین دورهٔ بروز وبا) written during the last cholera outbreak in 1906, this treatise was published at that time. To encourage and promote one of his students, Nazem al-Atebba attributed the work to his pupil Mirza Asadollah Jalil al-Atebba, stating in the title: “A brief treatise on the conditions for maintaining health and preventing the spread of infectious diseases, including the treatment of cholera, as dictated by me and written by Ali Akbar Tabib.”.
- His most notable non-medical work is the Farhang-e Nafisi, also known as Farhang-e Nazem al-Atebba, a four-volume Persian lexicon. He worked on this dictionary for over 25 years, and it was published during the reign of Reza Shah. Before the publication of Dehkhoda’s dictionary, it was considered the most comprehensive dictionary of the Persian language, containing 158,431 entries, 58,879 of which were Persian words. Nazem al-Atebba was so dedicated to this project that, at the age of 55, he began learning English to access the necessary resources for compiling the dictionary.

His son, Saeed Nafisi, in the preface he wrote for Farhang-e Nafisi, says:

"The most important work of the late Nazem al-Atebba, which occupied his mind until the end of his life, even three hours before sunset on Monday, June 9, 1924 (26 Dhu al-Qi'dah 1342 AH), when he passed away in Tehran at the age of 79 after several days of being bedridden due to dysentery, is this very book. He spent more than 25 years of his life writing it. Nazem al-Atebba displayed extraordinary perseverance, dedication, and patience in writing this book. For twenty-five full years, after completing his medical duties, he would go to his library and continue working on it. To illustrate his passion and commitment to this task, it is worth remembering that at the age of 55, he began learning English to consult English references for his book. Moreover, as a result of sitting for long hours day and night without any physical activity while working on the project, he developed gangrene in his thighs, which he had to treat for some time."
