= List of Iranian film directors =

This is a list of Iranian film directors representing various genres and periods of Iranian cinema.

== A ==
- Saber Abar
- Ali Abbasi
- Mostafa Abdollahi
- Narges Abyar
- Aramais Aghamalian
- Morteza Aghili
- Mohammad Ahmadi
- Mania Akbari
- Shahram Alidi
- Reza Allamehzadeh
- Cyrus Alvand
- Mohsen Amiryoussefi
- Kiarash Anvari
- Mohammad Reza Aslani
- Abolfazl Attar
- Reza Attaran
- Morteza Avini
- Kianoush Ayari

== B ==
- Reza Badiyi
- Maziar Bahari
- Ramin Bahrani
- Parisa Bakhtavar
- Rakhshan Bani-E'temad
- Bahram Bayzai
- Reza Beyk Imanverdi
- Asghar Bichareh
- Shiva Boloorian
- Marzieh Boroumand

== C ==
- Henri Charr

== D ==
- Hajir Darioush
- Alireza Davood Nejad
- Masoud Dehnamaki
- Pouran Derakhshandeh
- Kioumars Derambakhsh
- Reza Dormishian

== E ==
- Nader Ebrahimi
- Robert Ekhart
- Tanaz Eshaghian
- Matt Eskandari

== F ==
- Mehdi Fakhimzadeh
- Mitra Farahani
- Mohammad Ali Fardin
- Asghar Farhadi
- Bahman Farmanara
- Mohammad Farokhmanesh
- Hamid Farrokhnezhad
- Forough Farrokhzad
- Aryana Farshad
- Sepideh Farsi
- Hassan Fathi
- Reza Fazeli
- Sadaf Foroughi
- Frood Fouladvand

== G ==
- Kamran Ghadakchian
- Iraj Ghaderi
- Farrokh Ghaffari
- Shahyar Ghanbari
- Tina Gharavi
- Shapoor Gharib
- Behrouz Gharibpour
- Amir Ghavidel
- Regis Ghezelbash
- Bahman Ghobadi
- Fereydun Gole
- Ebrahim Golestan

== H ==
- Mani Haghighi
- Hassan Hajgozar
- Khosrow Haritash
- Zakaria Hashemi
- Ali Hatami
- Ebrahim Hatamikia
- Manijeh Hekmat
- Mohammad-Reza Honarmand
- Robert Hossein
- Shahab Hosseini
- Bozorgmehr Hosseinpour

== J ==
- Mehdi Jafari
- Masoud Jafari Jozani
- Abolfazl Jalili
- Vahid Jalilvand
- Rambod Javan
- Nima Javidi
- Fereydoun Jeyrani

== K ==
- Abdolreza Kahani
- Narges Kalhor
- Fariborz Kamkari
- Cyrus Kar
- Sadegh Karamyar
- Varuzh Karim-Masihi
- Niki Karimi
- Nosrat Karimi
- Mohammad Kart
- Ali Kasmaei
- Maryam Keshavarz
- Samuel Khachikian
- Valiollah Khakdan
- Loghman Khaledi
- Sina Khani
- Alireza Khatami
- Abbas Kiarostami
- Bahman Kiarostami
- Masoud Kimiai
- Parviz Kimiavi
- Alexis Kouros
- Esmail Koushan
- Mahmoud Koushan

== L ==
- Ali Limonadi
- Gholamhussein Lotfi

== M ==
- Mohammad Hossein Mahdavian
- Majid Majidi
- Hana Makhmalbaf
- Mohsen Makhmalbaf
- Samira Makhmalbaf
- Naser Malek Motiei
- Yassamin Maleknasr
- Asghar Massombagi
- Dariush Mehrjui
- Marzieh Meshkini
- Tahmineh Milani
- Maziar Miri
- Reza Mirkarimi
- Mehdi Missaghieh
- Mehran Modiri
- Jalal Moghadam
- Mahnaz Mohammadi
- Hamid Mojtahedi
- Shahram Mokri
- Rasoul Mollagholipour
- Esfandiar Monfaredzadeh
- Ebrahim Moradi
- Ali Mosaffa
- Bahman Motamedian
- Farzad Motamen
- Granaz Moussavi
- Duraid Munajim

== N ==
- Marva Nabili
- Amir Naderi
- Gholam-Hossein Naghshineh
- Shirin Neshat
- Parviz Nouri
- Mohammad Nourizad
- Hossein Nuri

== O ==
- Ovanes Ohanian
- Mostafa Oskooyi
- Arby Ovanessian

== P ==
- Tina Pakravan
- Jafar Panahi
- Kambuzia Partovi
- Maziar Partow
- Khosrow Parvizi
- Babak Payami
- Rafi Pitts
- Kiumars Poorahmad
- Ali Pourtash

== R ==
- Fereydoun Rahnema
- Hossein Rajabian
- Iraj Raminfar
- Rouzbeh Rashidi
- Behrouz Sebt Rasoul
- Mohammad Rasoulof
- Amir Shahab Razavian
- Mehdi Reisfirooz
- Shahla Riahi
- Jamil Rostami
- Saeed Roustayi

== S ==
- Rasul Sadr Ameli
- Afsaneh Salari
- Saman Salur
- Hamid Samandarian
- Marjane Satrapi
- Parviz Sayyad
- Soroush Sehhat
- Abdolhossein Sepanta
- Houman Seyyedi
- Hossein Shahabi
- Parviz Shahbazi
- Sohrab Shahid-Saless
- Shahrzad
- Javad Shamaqdari
- Siamak Shayeghi
- Amir Shervan
- Kamran Shirdel
- Mohammad Shirvani
- Khosrow Sinai

== T ==
- Kamal Tabrizi
- Nasser Taghvaei
- Hamid Tamjidi
- Susan Taslimi
- Bahram Tavakoli
- Farkhondeh Torabi

== V ==
- Joseph Vaezian
- Nosratollah Vahdat

== Y ==
- Siamak Yasemi
- Hassan Yektapanah

== Z ==
- Mona Zandi Haghighi
- Tony Zarrindast
- Noureddin Zarrinkelk

== See also ==
- Iranian cinema
- Persian theatre
- List of Iranian cinematographers
- List of Iranian films
