= Azar Hekmat Shoar =

Iranian actress (1935–1974)

- آذر حکمت شعار
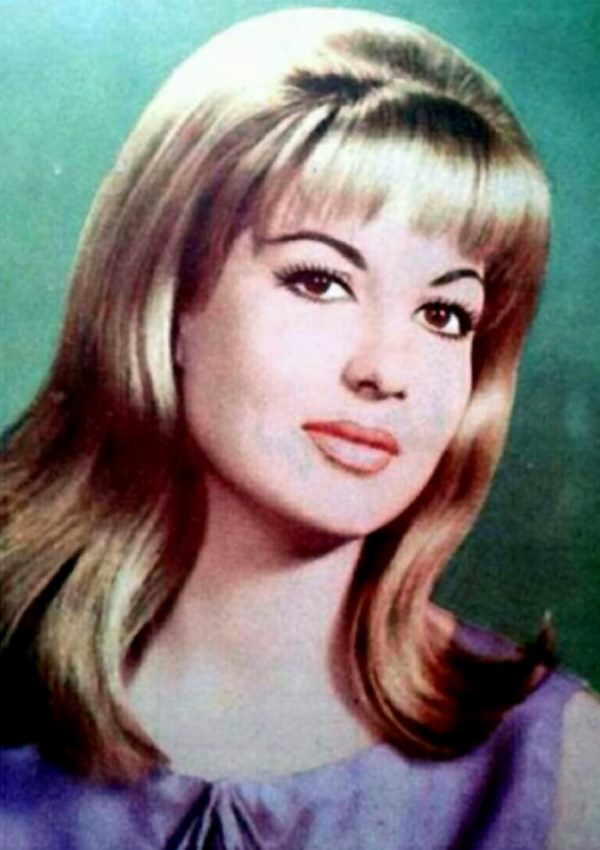
- Born: Azar Taj Dehghani Azar; 1935; Tabriz, Imperial State of Persia
- Died: 1974 (aged 38–39); Tehran, Iran
- Burial place: Behesht-e Zahra

Azar Hekmat Shoar (Persian: آذر حکمت شعار; née Azar Taj Dehghani Azar; 1935–1974) was an Iranian actress of cinema and theatre. She appeared in some 20 Iranian films in the 1960s.

== Biography ==
Azar Hekmat Shoar was born as Azar Taj Dehghani Azar in 1935 in Tabriz, Imperial State of Persia. Her acting career began in 1958 in the Iranian theater with the musical Khosrow and Shirin. She entered cinema in 1961 by acting in the film, "When the Sun Goes Down" which was never released.

She died in 1974 at the age of 39 in Tehran, due to a car accident. Her younger brother Dariush Dehghani Azar was a high-ranking police officer and commander of the Nima Guard, who was executed in 1983 for conspiracy against the Islamic Republic of Iran.

== Filmography ==
- 1961, The Skint, directed by Siamak Yasemi
- 1962, The Lost Flower, directed by Abbas Shabaviz
- 1963, The Claw (1963 film), directed by Amin Amini
- 1963, Pretty Foe, directed by Esmail Koushan
- 1963, An Angel in My House, directed by Aramais Aghamalian
- 1965, Dead End (1965 film), directed by Mehdi Mirsamadzadeh
- 1965, The Stray Hero, directed by Khosrow Parvizi
- 1965, The White Devil (1965 film), directed by Ahmad Safaei
- 1965, The Bright Horizon, directed by Mehdi Amir Ghasem Khani
- 1965, The Mummy (1965 film), directed by Hamid Mojtahedi
- 1966, Leilaj, directed by Iraj Ghaderi
- 1966, Rebellion (1966 film), directed by Samuel Khachikian
- 1966, Never Without Love, directed by Samuel Khachikian
- 1966, Confess (1966 film), directed by Naser Rafat
- 1968, A Glorious Tomorrow, directed by Samad Sabahi
- 1968, The Sun's Home, directed by Saeed Kamyar
- 1968, The Power of Love (1968 film), directed by Robert Ekhart and Marduk Alkhas
- 1968, Separate Beds (film), directed by Iraj Ghaderi
- 1968, Oath of Silence, directed by Iraj Ghaderi
- 1969, Song in Life, directed by Mehdi Reisfirooz
