= 1932 in Iran =

- Decades
- See also: Other events of 1932; Years in Iran

The following lists events that happened during 1932 in Pahlavi Iran.

== Incumbents ==
- Shah: Reza Shah
- Prime Minister: Mehdi Qoli Hedayat

== Events ==
- August 15 – 1932 Persian legislative election.

== Births ==
- January 3 – Habibollah Asgaroladi, Iranian politician.
- January 30 – Pooran Farrokhzad, Iranian writer.
- March 8 – Mostafa Chamran, Iranian politician.
- March 13 – Akbar Poudeh, Iranian cyclist.
- March 21 – Pari Saberi, Iranian theatre director.
- April 14 – Mansour Hazrati, Iranian amateur wrestler.
- May 5 – Mohammad Bayati, Iranian football goalkeeper.
- May 7 – Yadollah Royaee, Iranian poet.
- June 15 – David Alliance, Baron Alliance, British businessman and politician.
- June 22 – Soraya Esfandiary-Bakhtiary, Queen consort of Iran from 1951 to 1958.
- July 4 – Hamid Reza Pahlavi, Iranian royal.
- August 10 – Edman Ayvazyan, Iranian-Armenian painter.
- August 11 – Hushang Harirchiyan, Iranian actor.
- August 18 – Abbas Amir-Entezam, Iranian politician.
- August 23 – Yousef Sobouti, Iranian physicist.
- September 4 – Sadegh Aliakbarzadeh, Iranian boxer.
- September 27 – Hassan Farsam, Iranian academic.
- September 29 – Abdullah Ommidvar, Iranian-Chilean film producer.
- November 9 – Niku Kheradmand, Iranian actress and voice actress.
- November 11 – Jalal Cheraghpour, Iranian football manager.
- November 12 – Nasser Givehchi, Olympic wrestler.
- November 20 – Ali Safa-Sonboli, Iranian weightlifter.
- December 2 – Houchang Nahavandi, Iranian politician.
- December 16 – S. L. Hakimi, Iranian–American mathematician.
- ? – Abdol Ghayoom Ebrahimi, Chancellor of Islamic Azad University of Gorgan.
- ? – Abdol-Ali Mirza Farman Farmaian, Qajar prince.
- ? – Abdolkarim Hasheminejad, Iranian politician.
- ? – Ali Orumian, Iranian Ayatollah.
- ? – Aramesh Dustdar, Iranian writer and philosopher.
- ? – Fereydoun Mahdavi, Iranian economist and politician.
- ? – Hamid Enayat, Iranian philosopher, translator and essayist.
- ? – Iloosh Khoshabe, Iranian actor and sportsperson.
- ? – Jafar Shojouni, Iranian politician.
- ? – Khosrow Haritash, Iranian film director.
- ? – Mahmoud Koushan, Iranian cinematographer.
- ? – Mostafa Tajik, Iranian amateur wrestler.
- ? – Reza Sadr, Iranian politician.
- ? – Suleiman Moini, Iranian politician.
- ? – Taqi Modarresi, Iranian writer and child psychiatrist.
- ? – Yadollah Samareh, Iranian linguist.

== Deaths ==
- August 28 – Mostowfi ol-Mamalek, Iranian politician.
- November 4 – Najm al-Saltaneh, Iranian philanthropist.
- December 1 – Ali Karimi (footballer, born 1982), Footballer.
- ? – Jamshid Bahman Jamshidian, Iranian politician and banker.
- ? – Soleiman Khan Meykadeh, Iranian politician.
