= Arman (actor) =

Iranian actor and film director

Arman (Aramais Vardan Hovsepian)
- Arman
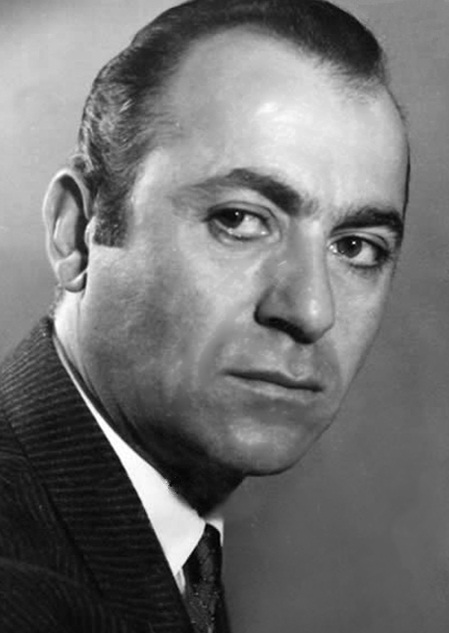
- Born: Aramais Vardani Hovsepian; 21 February 1921; Tabriz, Iran
- Died: 8 August 1980 (aged 59); Barcelona, Spain
- Resting place: Burastan Cemetery, Khavaran, Tehran
- Occupations: Actor, director
- Years active: 1952–1980
- Spouse: Zhenik Hovsepian - Mirzoian
- Children: 4 (including Lorik Minassian)

Aramais Vardani Hovsepian (Armenian: Արամայիս Վարդանի Հովսեփյան), known as Arman Hovsepian (Persian: آرمان هوسپیان; February 21, 1921 – August 8, 1980) was an Iranian Armenian actor.

== Biography ==
He was born Aramais Vardan Hovsepian (Armenian: Արամայիս Վարդան Յովսէփեան; Persian: آرامائیس وارطان هُوسپیان), on 21 February 1921 in Tabriz. He started performing in school theaters before he landed a major role in Namus in 1940 and entered nonprofessional theater. He moved to Tehran in 1954 and joined the theater group of Ararat Club and worked with celebrities like Joseph Vaezian, Samuel Khachikian, and Aramais Aghamalian.

He made his first screen debut in Khachikian's first film, The Return (1953), and opted to act mainly in his following pictures: A Girl From Shiraz, Crossroads of Incidents, Blood and Grace, Storm in Our Town, A Cry at Midnight, and Apprehension. Arman was one of the distinctive actors of the 1950s and 1960s Iranian cinema, and the brand of characters he portrayed was mostly rich people gone bankrupt or confronted with serious problems. He tried his hand in directing and producing films with Bride of the Sea in 1965 and raised his production to five. The Tenant (1972) was another movie he directed, produced, and played. He was also the actor and producer of two films by Mohammad Deljou and Amir Mojahed: Cronies (1974) and The Night of the Loners (1975). He died on August 8, 1980, at the age 59 in Barcelona and was buried at Christian Armenian Burastan Cemetery in Tehran.

== Filmography ==
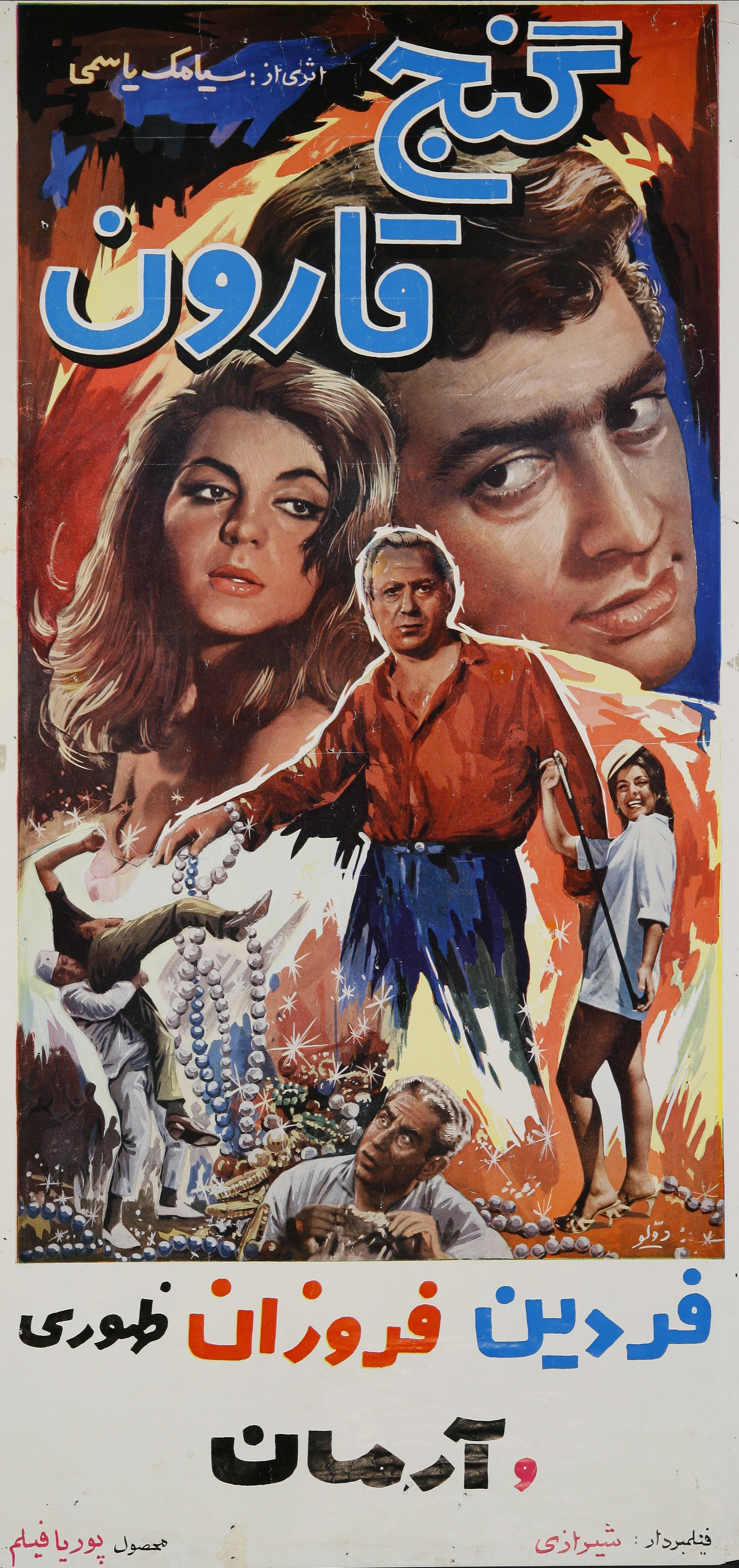
Croesus' Treasure (1965)

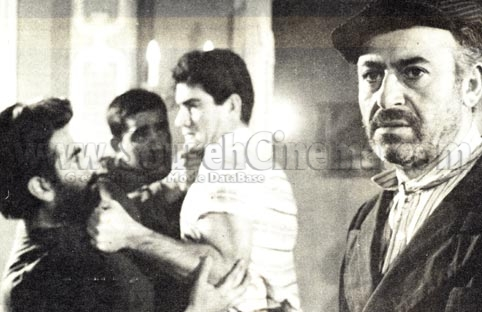
Arman in The Bride of the Sea (1965), first from right

- 1980 Crossing the Night
- 1979 Goft har se nafareshan
- 1975 Mamal Amricayi
- 1975 Night of Foreigners
- 1974 The Compromise
- 1972 Ghadir
- 1972 The Spring (TV movie)
- 1971 For Whom the Hearts Beat
- 1971 Jan-sakht
- 1970 Ghesseye shab-e Yalda
- 1970 Wrath of Eagles
- 1970 Leyli and Majnoon
- 1969 Pesaran-e Gharoon
- 1968 Charkh-E-Bazigar
- 1968 Poli be sooye behesht
- 1966 Rebellion
- 1966 Shamsi pahlevoon
- 1965 Croesus' Treasure
- 1965 The Bride of the Sea (also director)
- 1964 The Devil Is Knocking
- 1964 The Humans
- 1964 The Strike
- 1963 Highway of Death
- 1962 Anxiety
- 1961 The Bum
- 1961 The Midnight Terror
- 1958 Storm in Our Town
- 1955 The Crossroad of Events
- 1955 Blood and Honor
- 1953 A Girl From Shiraz
