= Broken Spell =

Broken Spell can refer to:

- Broken Spell (film), a 1958 Iranian film
- Broken Spell, a Power Rangers episode
