= 1868 in Iran =

- Decades
- See also: Other events of 1868; Years in Iran

The following lists events that happened during 1868 in Qajar era.

== Incumbents ==
- Monarch: Naser al-Din Shah Qajar

== Births ==
- April 1 – Vosugh od-Dowleh, Prime Minister of Iran.
- ? – Emad al-Kottab, Iranian artist and calligrapher.
- ? – Khalou Hossein Bord Khuni Dashti, Iranian fighter.
- ? – Mohammad Hossein Esheni Qudejani, Iranian religious servant.
- ? – Soleiman Khan Meykadeh, Iranian politician.
- ? – Yeprem Khan, Armenian revolutionary.
