= Ali Kasmaei =

Iranian voice actor, director, screenwriter and journalist (1915–2012)

- علی کسمایی
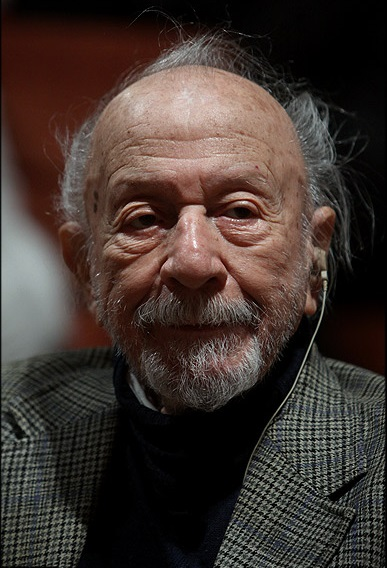
- Kasmaei in 2010
- Born: September 24, 1915; Tehran, Iran
- Died: June 26, 2012; Tehran, Iran
- Occupation: Voice actor (dubbing artist)
- Years active: 1960-2000
- Known for: Iranian dubbed father

Ali Kasmaei (Persian: علی کسمایی; born 24 September 1915 in Tehran – died 2 July 2012, Tehran) was an Iranian voice actor, Film director, screenwriter and journalist. He is known as the father of Iranian dubbing.

== Life ==
Kasmaei entered professional cinema in 1950 by writing the screenplay for the film Ashamed (1950 film) (directed by Esmaeil Koshan). In addition to writing, he has also worked in other branches of cinema such as directing and acting. However, the main reason for Kasmaei's fame is his expertise in dubbing and dubbing management. In 1955, he turned to voice acting as a dubbing director and spent many years developing dubbing techniques and training young and talented voice actors. Kasmaei is the master of many famous Iranian voice actors. Due to his long history in this field, he is known as the father of Iranian dubbing.

== Death ==
Ali Kasmaei died of old age in Tehran on Tuesday, October 1, 2012, after a long illness.

== Managing dubbing of foreign films ==
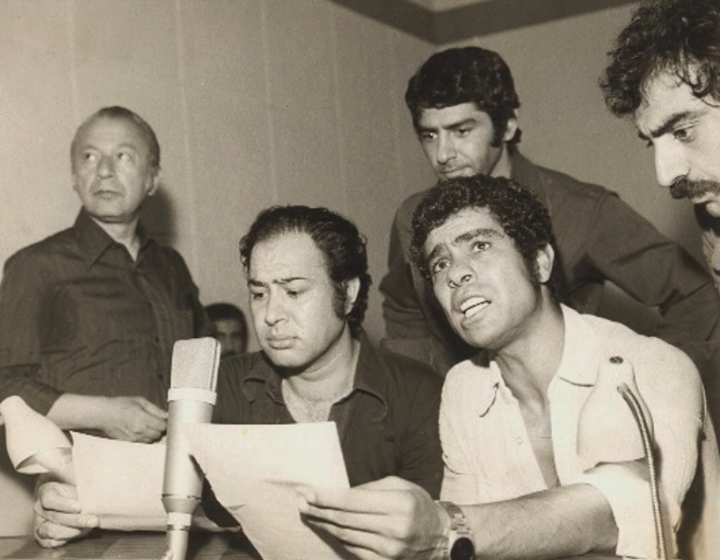
The Deer (film) Dubbing 1974 - From Right Masoud Kimiai, Behrouz Vossoughi, Faramarz Gharibian, Hossein Erfani, Ali Kasmaei

- Prince of Foxes (film)
- The Lady from Texas
- A Place in the Sun (1951 film)
- Limelight (1952 film)
- Mother (1952 film)
- Roman Holiday
- The War of the Worlds (1953 film)
- Désirée (film) / 1954
- Sabrina (1954 film)
- The Barefoot Contessa / 1954
- Othello (1955 film)
- War and Peace (1956 film)
- Giant (1956 film)
- Gates of Paris (film)
- Man of a Thousand Faces (film)
- The Defiant Ones
- Man of the West
- I Want to Live!
- Separate Tables (film)
- This Earth Is Mine (1959 film)
- Anatomy of a Murder
- Imitation of Life (1959 film)
- Career (1959 film)
- The Hound of the Baskervilles (1959 film)
- The Devil's Disciple (1959 film)
- Suddenly, Last Summer (film)
- Song Without End
- Elmer Gantry (film)
- Breakfast at Tiffany's (film)
- Judgment at Nuremberg
- Birdman of Alcatraz (film)
- How the West Was Won (film)
- To Kill a Mockingbird (film)
- My Fair Lady (film)
- Guess Who's Coming to Dinner
- State of Siege
