= List of Iranian cinematographers =

This is a list of Iranian cinematographers (Persian: فیلمبرداران ایران).

- Mirza Ebrahim Khan Akkas Bashi
- Hossein Jafarian
- Javad Jalali
- Mahmoud Kalari
- Darius Khondji
- Mahmoud Koushan
- Firooz Malekzadeh
- Amir Mokri
- Ovanes Ohanian
- Morteza Poursamadi
- Mirza Ebrahim Khan Sahhafbashi
