= Hossein Erfani =

Iranian voice actor

Hossein Erfani حسین عرفانی
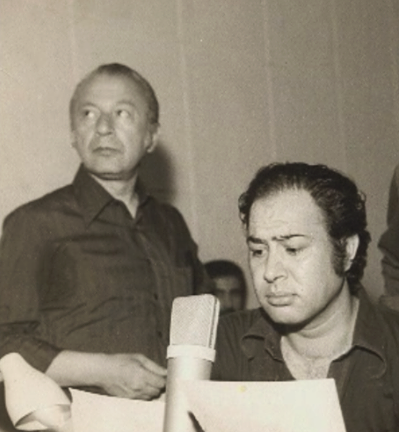
- Hossein Erfani (front) and Ali Kasmaei, 1974
- Born: 27 July 1942
- Died: 12 September 2018 (aged 76)
- Spouse: Shahla Nazerian
- Children: 1

Hossein Erfani Parsaei (Persian: حسین عرفانی پارسایی) was an Iranian voice actor who is known for Persian voice-dubbing of foreign films.

== Career ==
=== Voice acting ===
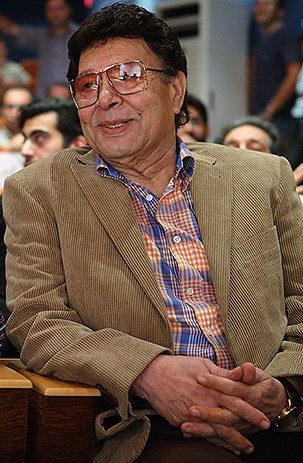
Hossein Erfani, June 2013

Hossein Erfani started his career as a voice actor at the Moulin Rouge Studio in Tehran in 1961. He is known for dubbing over Humphrey Bogart roles in Maltese Falcon or Casablanca and Clark Gable role as Rhett Butler From Gone with the Wind. He has also dubbed over some of Orson Welles, Marlon Brando, Charlton Heston, Gene Hackman, Toshiro Mifune, William Holden, Morgan freeman and Arnold Schwarzenegger's voice roles in films they starred in. He has also dubbed over Iranian actors such as Bahman Mofid's role in Dash Akol Movie, Faramarz Gharibian's role in The Deer and Jahangir Forouhar's role in Daie Jan Napoleon Iranian Television serial in the 1970s.

Some of Hossein Erfani's Works
Actor	Role	Film
Humphrey Bogart	Sam Spade	Maltese Falcon
Clark Gable	Rhett Butler	Gone with the Wind
Orson Welles	Othello	Othello
Marlon Brando	Fletcher Christian	Mutiny on the Bounty
Morgan Freeman	Ellis Boyd	The Shawshank Redemption
Arnold Schwarzenegger	The Terminator/T-800 Model 101	Terminator 2

=== Acting career ===
Erfani began his acting career in 1974, playing a role in “Bitter and Sweet”, a popular TV serial directed by Mansur Purmand. He was also known for Hormat-e Rafigh (1977) and Sim-e Khardar (1981).

=== Radio ===
Erfani worked with voice actor and director Manuchehr Nozari in "Friday morning with you" and other radio programs in 1980s.
