= The Nights of Tehran =

1953 film

- Directed by: Siamak Yasemi
- Written by: Sadegh Bahrami
- Production company: Pars Film
- Release date: 24 September 1953
- Running time: 110 minutes
- Country: Iran
- Language: Persian

The Nights of Tehran (Persian: شب‌های تهران, romanized: Shabhāye Tehrān) is a 1953 Iranian film directed by Siamak Yasemi.

== Bibliography ==
- Mohammad Ali Issari. Cinema in Iran, 1900-1979. Scarecrow Press, 1989.
