= Amir Mokri =

Iranian-American cinematographer (born 1956)

- امیر مکری
- Born: June 11, 1956 (age 70); Iran
- Education: Emerson College; American Film Institute
- Years active: 1985–present
- Spouse: Winnie Fredriksz

Amir M. Mokri (Persian: امیر مکری; born June 11, 1956) is an Iranian-American cinematographer, known for his work on blockbuster action films.

== Early life ==
Mokri was born in Iran and emigrated to the United States in 1977.

== Filmography ==
Feature film

Year	Title	Director	Notes
1987	Slam Dance	Wayne Wang	
1987	House of the Rising Sun	Greg Gold	
1989	Eat a Bowl of Tea	Wayne Wang	
1989	Life Is Cheap... But Toilet Paper Is Expensive	Wayne Wang	Also credited as writer
1990	Blue Steel	Kathryn Bigelow	
1990	Pacific Heights	John Schlesinger	
1991	Queens Logic	Steve Rash	
1991	Whore	Ken Russell	
1992	Freejack	Geoff Murphy	Uncredited
1993	The Joy Luck Club	Wayne Wang	
1996	Eye for an Eye	John Schlesinger	
2000	Coyote Ugly	David McNally	
2001	Don't Say a Word	Gary Fleder	
2002	The Salton Sea	D. J. Caruso	
2003	Bad Boys II	Michael Bay	
2004	Taking Lives	D.J. Caruso	
2005	Lord of War	Andrew Niccol	
2007	National Treasure: Book of Secrets	Jon Turteltaub	Co-cinematographer with John Schwartzman
2008	Vantage Point	Pete Travis	
2009	Fast & Furious	Justin Lin	
2011	Season of the Witch	Dominic Sena	
2011	Transformers: Dark of the Moon	Michael Bay	
2013	Man of Steel	Zack Snyder	
2014	Transformers: Age of Extinction	Michael Bay	
2014	Good Kill	Andrew Niccol	
2015	Pixels	Chris Columbus	
2016	Birth of the Dragon	George Nolfi	
2017	Once Upon a Time in Venice	Mark Cullen	
2018	Anon	Andrew Niccol	
2018	Superfly	Director X	
2019	Murder Mystery	Kyle Newacheck	
2020	Feel the Beat	Elissa Down	
2027	Lords of War	Andrew Niccol	Post-production

Television

Year	Title	Director	Note
2022	The First Lady	Susanne Bier	All 10 episodes

== Accolades ==
Year	Award	Category	Title	Result
1987	Independent Spirit Awards	Best Cinematography	Slam Dance	Nominated
1989	Independent Spirit Awards	Best Cinematography	Life Is Cheap... But Toilet Paper Is Expensive	Nominated

== See also ==
- Iranian cinema
- Iranian cinematographers
