= Mahnaz Mohammadi =

Iranian filmmaker and women's rights activist. (born 1975)

- Persian: مهناز محمدی
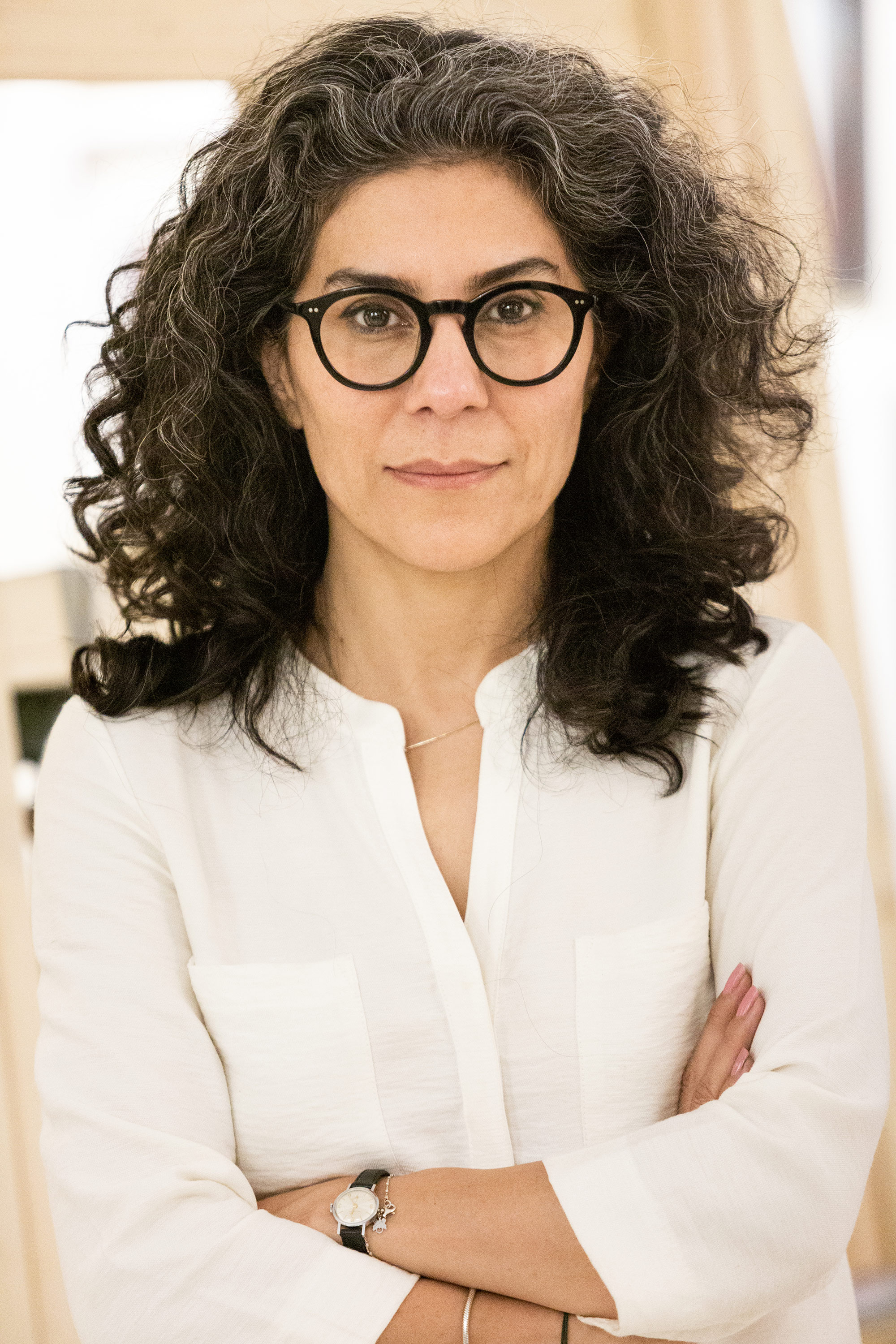
- Born: 1 January 1975 (age 50); Tehran, Iran
- Occupations: Filmmaker; Women's rights Activist
- Years active: 2003–present
- Notable work: Son–Mother (2019); Women without Shadows (2003); Travolugue (2007)

Mahnaz Mohammadi (Persian: مهناز محمدی; born 1 January 1975, Tehran) is an Iranian filmmaker and women's rights activist. She wrote and directed her first film in 2003, "Women Without Shadows", depicting the lives of homeless and abandoned women in a state-run shelter, has been shown and awarded in several international film festivals.

Mahnaz wrote, directed and produced various documentaries, including "Travelogue" another award-winning film that was shown in 2010 at the event "A Day in Tehran" created by the Cinematheque in Paris.

She has been also active in the women's movement. She was awarded the freedom of speech awards, George 2015, from Austria.

== Film career ==
=== Women Without Shadows (2003) ===
Mahnaz Mohammadi wrote and directed her first film in 2003, "Women Without Shadows" produced by Amir Samavati. This film, depicting the lives of homeless and abandoned women in a state-run shelter, has been shown and awarded in several international film festivals.

=== Travelogue (2008) ===
She wrote, directed and produced herself various documentaries, including "Travelogue" another award-winning film. Shot in the train between Tehran and Ankara, the director met and questioned passengers about the reasons that lead them to leave their country. This film was shown in 2010 at the event "A Day in Tehran" created by the Cinematheque in Paris, with Mohammadi in attendance.

Since the publishing of this film, Iranian authorities have refused her to leave the country, including after she was invited to the Cannes film festival for the film "Wedding Ephemerals" directed by Reza Serkanian, in which she plays the main character.

=== We Are Half the Iran's Population (2009) ===
Mahnaz Mohammadi has also contributed to famous filmmaker Rakhshan Bani-Etemad's documentary "We Are Half the Iran's Population" portraying the demands of Iranian women in the disputed presidential elections of 2009, which gave Mahmoud Ahmadinejad a second term in office. In 2011 the film was screened at the Viennese film festival "This Human World."

=== Son-Mother (2019) ===
Mahnaz Directed her first fiction feature film “Son-Mother” in 2019 that was premiered in the 44th Toronto international film festival. The film has been awarded The Amnesty award of Febio Fest film Festival in Prague, The Audience award of Istanbul Film Festival and Special jury award of Rome Film Fest 2020. Son-Mother has attended numerous international film festivals such as Zurich Film Festival, Alice Nella Citta in Italy, CPH:PIX in Copenhagen, AFI FEST Los Angeles, International Film Festival of India in Goa, Rio de Janeiro International Film Festival, Göteborg International Film Festival, Glasgow Film Festival, Edinburgh Iranian Film Festival, Hong Kong International Film Festival, ZLIN - International Film Festival for Children and Youth & FilmFesr Hamburg.

== Awards ==
Son-Mother Feature Film

- The Amnesty award of Febio Fest film Festival - Prague
- The Audience award of Istanbul Film Festival
- The Special jury award of Rome Film Fest 2020

Women without Shadows Documentary

- Best directing nomination in Iran Khane Cinema Festival
- Best Film in Female Filmmakers Festival

Travelogue Documentary

- Best Film nomination in Cinema vérité Film Festival
- Special Jury Prize in Parvin Etesami Film Festival

== Legal issues ==
Her arrest on 26 June 2011 was the third since 2007. She was arrested for the first time in March 2007 along with 32 other women's rights activists while peacefully protesting the trial of five of her fellow women's rights activists in front of a Tehran court. She stayed in jail for 3 weeks. Mohammadi was also arrested in August 2009 at Behesht-e Zahra cemetery as she laid a wreath on the grave of Neda Agha-Soltan, the 26-year-old woman who was shot and killed by a sniper during the crackdowns on protests against the re-election of Iranian President Mahmoud Ahmadinejad. She was arrested with a lot of people including famous director Jafar Panahi They were released after one day.

After her release on bail on 28 July 2011, also due to international pressure, Mahnaz Mohammadi continued under close state observation by Iranian intelligence, her passport was withheld by the court and the ban to work as a filmmaker has remained in place since 2009. Her home was repeatedly searched by intelligence, and her personal items, work equipment and film material have been regularly confiscated. Her health has severely deteriorated during her last detention.

On Saturday, June 7, 2014, the Iranian women's rights activist and filmmaker was again arrested. She was sentenced to five years in prison for "endangering national security" and "propaganda against the Iranian regime." Iranian authorities have accused her of working for the BBC, a charge which apparently carries the assumption of espionage in the Iranian legal system. Mohammadi denies ever having worked with the network, and has stated that her interrogators tried pressuring her into admitting she had in exchange for leniency.

At the 64th Cannes Film Festival, filmmaker Costa-Gavras read a letter that Mohammadi sent from Tehran: "I am a woman and a film maker, two reasons sufficient to be treated like a criminal in this country"

== See also ==
- Cinema of Iran
- List of Iranian film directors
- Women's rights movement in Iran
- Human rights in the Islamic Republic of Iran
