= Pretty Foe =

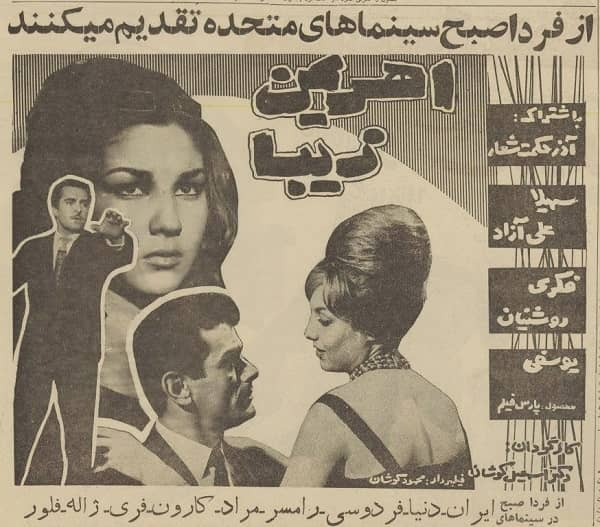
- Directed by: Esmail Koushan
- Written by: Esmail Koushan
- Produced by: Esmail Koushan
- Starring: Azar Hekmat Shoar; Ali Azad; Soraya Bakisa (Soheila); Rahim Roshanian; Moezzdivan Fekri; Maliheh Nasiri; Akbar Jannati Shirazi; Hossein Mohseni
- Release date: 1963
- Running time: 103 minutes
- Country: Iran
- Language: Persian

Pretty Foe (Persian: اهریمن زیبا, romanized: Ahriman-e Ziba, lit. 'demonic and beautiful') is a 1963 Iranian Persian-genre romance drama film directed by Esmail Koushan. It starred Azar Hekmat Shoar, Ali Azad, Soheila (actress), Rahim Roshanian, Moezzdivan Fekri, Maliheh Nasiri, Akbar Jannati Shirazi, and Hossein Mohseni. After her father decides to marry her to an old man for the fourth time, Zari runs away from her hometown to the city, and after a few days of living in a house, she is dragged to the cabaret.
