= Parviz Nouri =

Iranian film critic, screenwriter and director (1938–2026)

- پرویز نوری
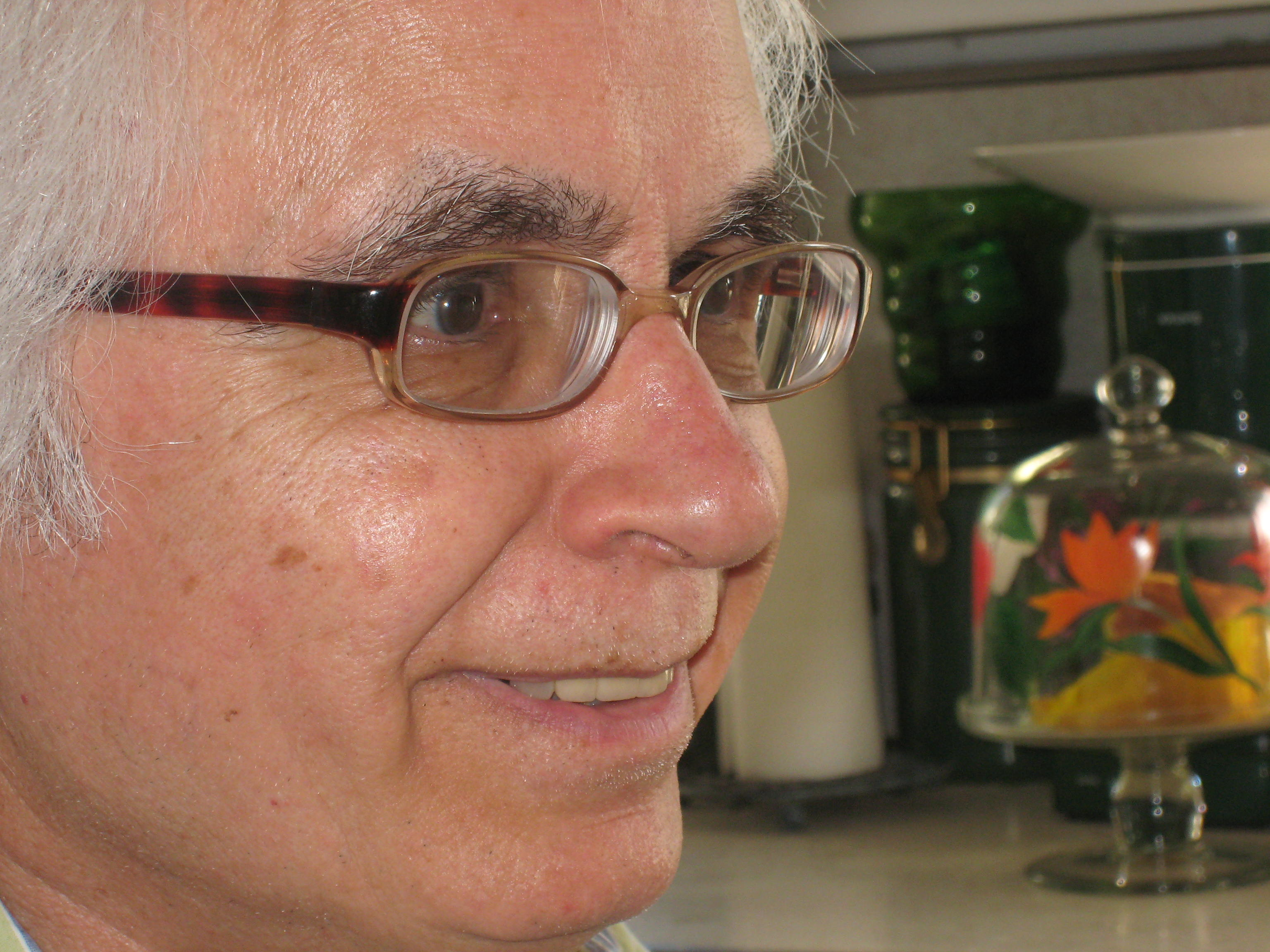
- Born: May 1, 1938; Tehran, Iran
- Died: January 28, 2026 (aged 87)
- Occupations: Director, film critic

Parviz Nouri (Persian: پرویز نوری; May 1, 1938 – January 28, 2026) was an Iranian film critic, screenwriter and director who was involved in production of over 20 films and television shows. He resided in the United States in the San Francisco Bay area with his wife, Soraya Shivai.

== Early life and education ==
Parviz Nouri was born in Tehran on May 1, 1938. His interest in cinema began at an early age. He published his first article, a review of Fred Zinnemann's High Noon, at the age of 15. Parviz obtained his bachelor's degree from University of Tehran in Archeology.

== Professional life ==
Nouri started his career as a freelance writer for Setareh Cinema, and a number of other publications including Omid Iran, Sepid-o-Siah and Ferdowsi Magazine. Nouri was promoted to the editor of Setareh Cinema in 1959 and began an era in the magazine's history promoting and introducing Iranian film enthusiasts to great directors such as Ingmar Bergman, Alfred Hitchcock, Federico Fellini, Howard Hawks and John Ford. After his tenure at Setareh Cinema, which ended in 1963, Nouri self-published a number of independent magazines, including Film, and Honar and Cinema (Arts and the Movies).

He began his film production career as a screenwriter. In 1970, he directed his first film, Se Ta Jahel, followed in the next year by his highly acclaimed Rashid, starring Behrouz Vossoughi. In 1972 Nouri directed one of the blockbusters of the year, Hakimbashi, starring Nosrat Karimi. Nouri and Karimi's collaboration continued in 1973 with another popular blockbuster in Ayalvar.

Nouri's last pre-revolution film, Khosh-Gheirat, was banned, forcing him to explore directing opportunities in the blossoming Iranian Television industry. He produced two highly popular series, Khanevadeh Haj Lotfollah, and Hezar-0 Yek Shab (One Thousand and One Nights).

After the Islamic Revolution of 1979 in Iran, Nouri directed Toloo-e Enfejar, (Dawn of Explosion) starring his childhood friend Davoud Rashidi. In the following years, Nouri wrote a number of screenplays which included, Bazi Tamam Shod, Sadeh-Loh, Shetab Zadeh, and Hamsar.

In 2010 Parviz and his wife returned to Iran for a short visit and starred in Dariush Mehrjui's Tehran Tehran. He occasionally wrote articles for Film Monthly, Bani Film and 24 Magazine.

== Death ==
Parviz died on January 27, 2026, at the age of 87.

== See also ==
- List of Iranian film directors

== Sources ==
- Tehran Tehran
