= Life Is Cheap... But Toilet Paper Is Expensive =

1989 American film

Life Is Cheap...But Toilet Paper Is Expensive
- Directed by: Wayne Wang
- Written by: Spencer Nakasako; Amir Mokri; Wayne Wang
- Produced by: Winnie Mokri
- Starring: Cheng Wan Kin
- Cinematography: Amir Mokri
- Edited by: Sandy Nervig
- Music by: Mark Adler
- Production companies: Far East Stars; Forever Profit Investment
- Distributed by: Silverlight Entertainment
- Release date: August 24, 1990
- Running time: 83 minutes
- Country: United States
- Language: English

Life Is Cheap...But Toilet Paper Is Expensive is a 1989 black comedy film directed by Wayne Wang. The film stars Cheng Wan Kin and John Chan. It won an award at the 1990 Rotterdam International Film Festival.

== Plot summary ==
A man is hired by people he believes to be gangsters to deliver a briefcase from America to Hong Kong.

== Cast ==
- Spencer Nakasako as the lead
- Lo Wai as The Big Boss, Mr Lo
- Cora Miao as Money
- Bonnie Ngai as Ying Ying (The Daughter)
- John Chan as The Anthropologist (The Son In Law)
- Cheng Wan Kin as Duck Killer
- Kwan-Min Cheng as Uncle Cheng
- Allen Fong as Taxi Driver
- Rocky Wing Cheung Ho as Punk #2
- Angela Yu Chien as Blue Velvet

== Reception ==
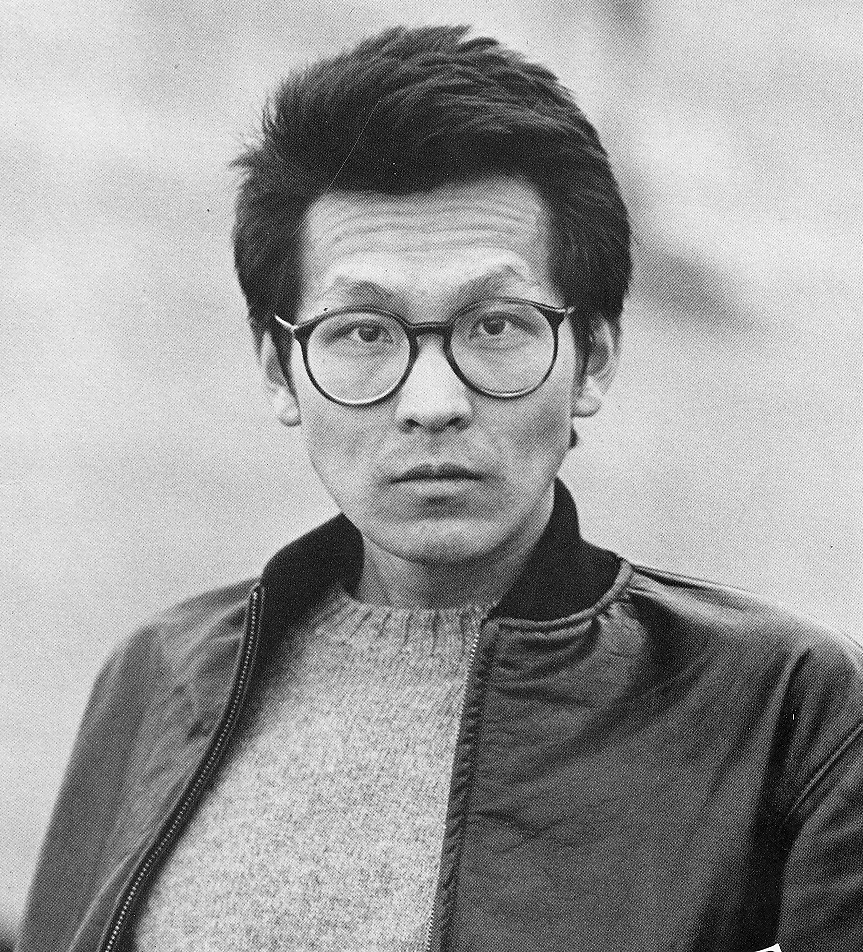
Director Wayne Wang in 1982

The film was the subject of controversy when it originally received an X rating from the Motion Picture Association of America, the distributor, Silverlight Entertainment, chose to release it without this rating and with a self-anointed adults-only A rating.

On their TV show for the week of August 13–17, 1990, film critics Gene Siskel and Roger Ebert praised the decision to apply the A rating since it was a concept they had often discussed on At the Movies in the context of harshly criticizing the MPAA's standards of forcing serious films aimed at adult audiences to either undergo damaging edits to receive R ratings or be locked out of most theatrical and advertising outlets. While neither Roger nor Gene thought the movie was very good (they both gave it a thumbs-down verdict) they appreciated the director and studio taking this stand, and hoped it would someday lead to a viable ratings designation for films that were for adults but weren't pornographic.

In 2022, the film received a 4K restoration, released theatrically by Arbelos Films. Arbelos later released it on Blu-ray in 2023.
