= Abolfazl Attar =

Iranian film director (born 1968)

Abolfazl Attar "Adin Attar"
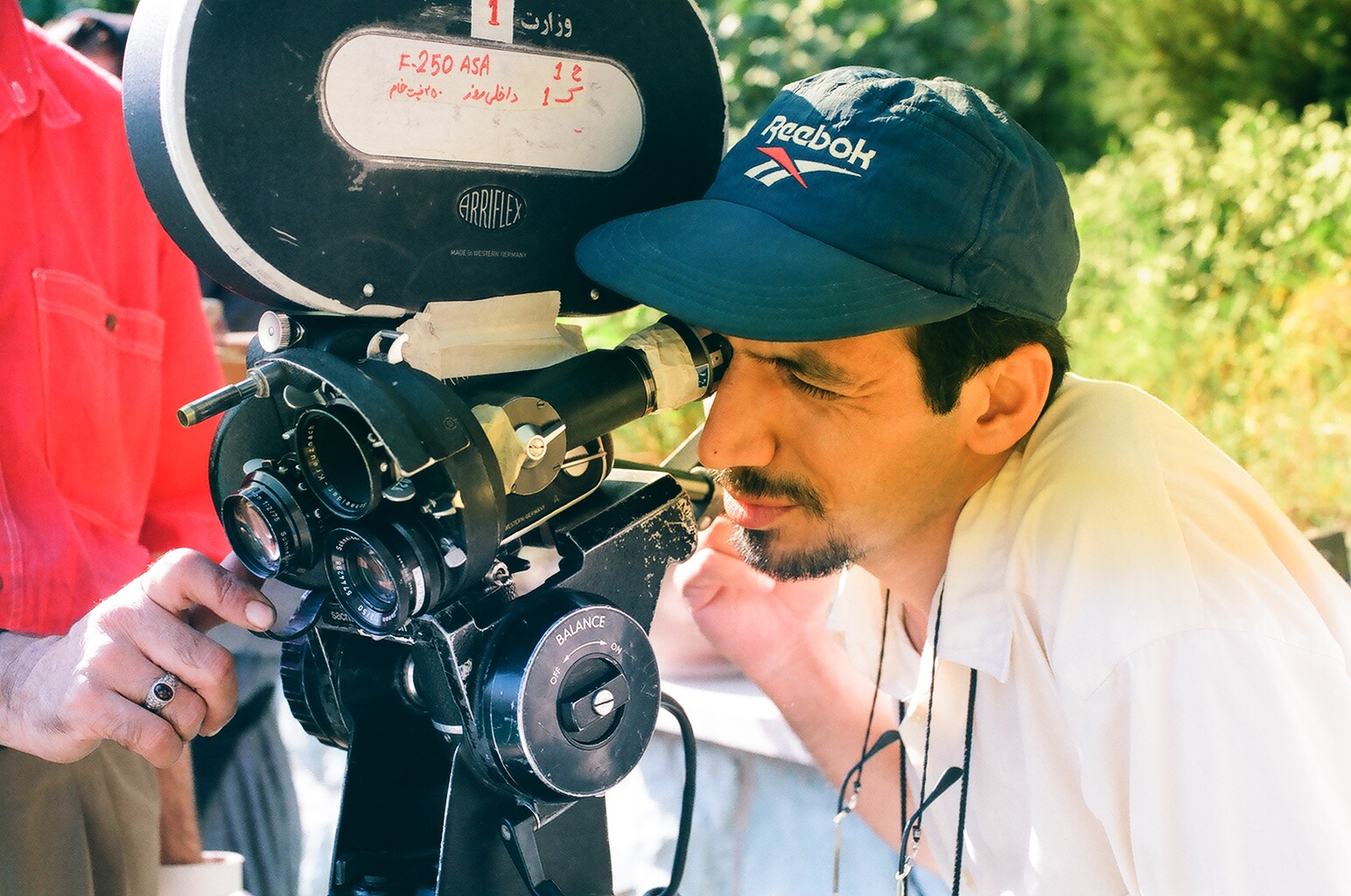
- Born: 23 September 1968 (age 58); Mashhad, Iran
- Occupations: Film director, actor, film editor, screenwriter
- Years active: 1981–present

Mirza Abolfazl Attar. Z "Adin Attar" (Persian: ابوالفضل عطار; born September 23, 1968) is an Iranian film director, actor, screenwriter and film editor.

== Early life ==
Adin Attar was born in Mashhad, Razavi Khorasan Province, Iran and started learning filmmaking in the early 1980s. He was an active member of the Iranian Young Cinema Society. In 2007 he conducted a research project to revise and improve the legal rights of authors and intellectual property owners, and presented it to the Iranian authorities.

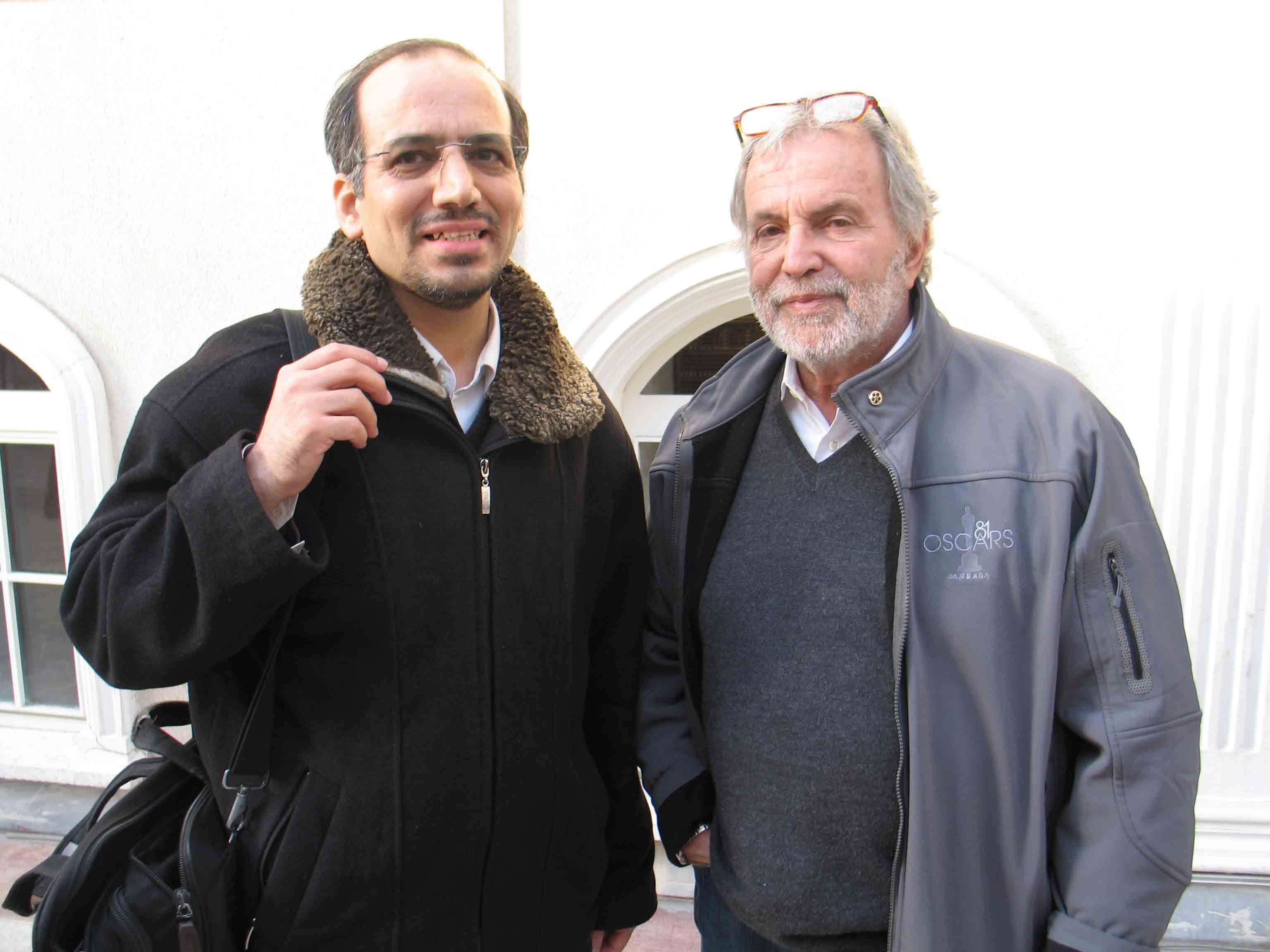
Attar & Sid Ganis, President of Oscar Academy 2009, Tehran, Iran

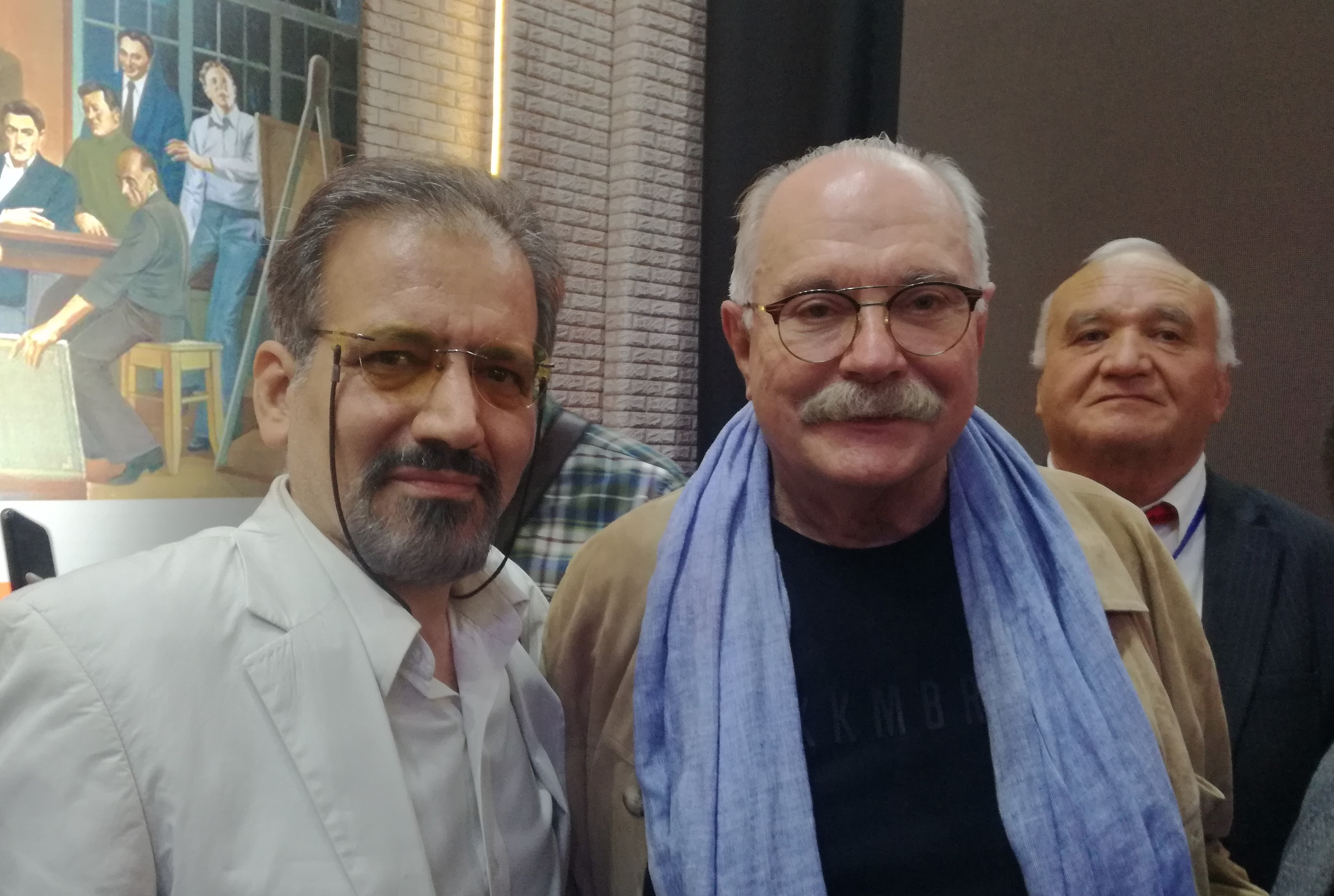
Attar & Nikita Mikhalkov, Russian filmmaker and actor, Tashkent International Film Festival, Uzbekistan 2021

== Memberships ==
Founder, executive director & head of management, SETAYESH FILM
Union of Iranian Entertainment Companies (UIEC)
The Iranian Alliance of Motion Picture Guilds
Iranian Young Cinema Society (IYCS)

== Activities ==
Artistic activity started in 1981 with the theater in Mashhad.
Making short films,8 mm, 16 mm and 35 mm
Making documentary films and video advertising
Teaching filmmaking in Mashhad Young Cinema Society, Howze Honari and private institutions
Started professional filmmaking in 1993 with TV This home is far away"
Collaborated with more than fifty short films, half long, series and movies.
Screenwriter, consulting, planning, production manager, editing, actor, assistant director & cinematographer.
Member of jury in film festival: Iranian Young Cinema Society provinces: Khorasan, Gilan, Mazandaran, Semnan
Writing articles and film criticism in newspapers Khorasan, culture and cinema & soure
Secretary of Scientific, Cultural, Art & Literature Services in newspaper of Gozaresh -e- Rooz

== Selected filmography ==
Year	Film				
1988	FOR ALL OF US	Screenwriter			
1988	TO THE DUST AGAIN	Screenwriter			
1986	THE BURNED EARTH	Screenwriter	Director	Editor	
1986	ROOTS IN DEPTH	Screenwriter	Director	Editor	
1987	THE RINGING OF MY BELL	Screenwriter	Director	Editor	
1990	WINDOW ON ALLEY	Screenwriter	Director		Production manager
1999	The Law of Karma	Screenwriter	Director		Line producer
2008	EMPLOYMENT AND UNEMPLOYMENT	Screenwriter	Director	Editor	
2010-11	REFERENCE POINT		Director		
2011	MY DEAR FAMILY (YOUTHFULNESS)		Director	Co-editor	Line producer
2011-12	THE LAST RAINY DREAM		Director		
2013	SEVENTH PASSWORD			Editor	

== As an actor ==
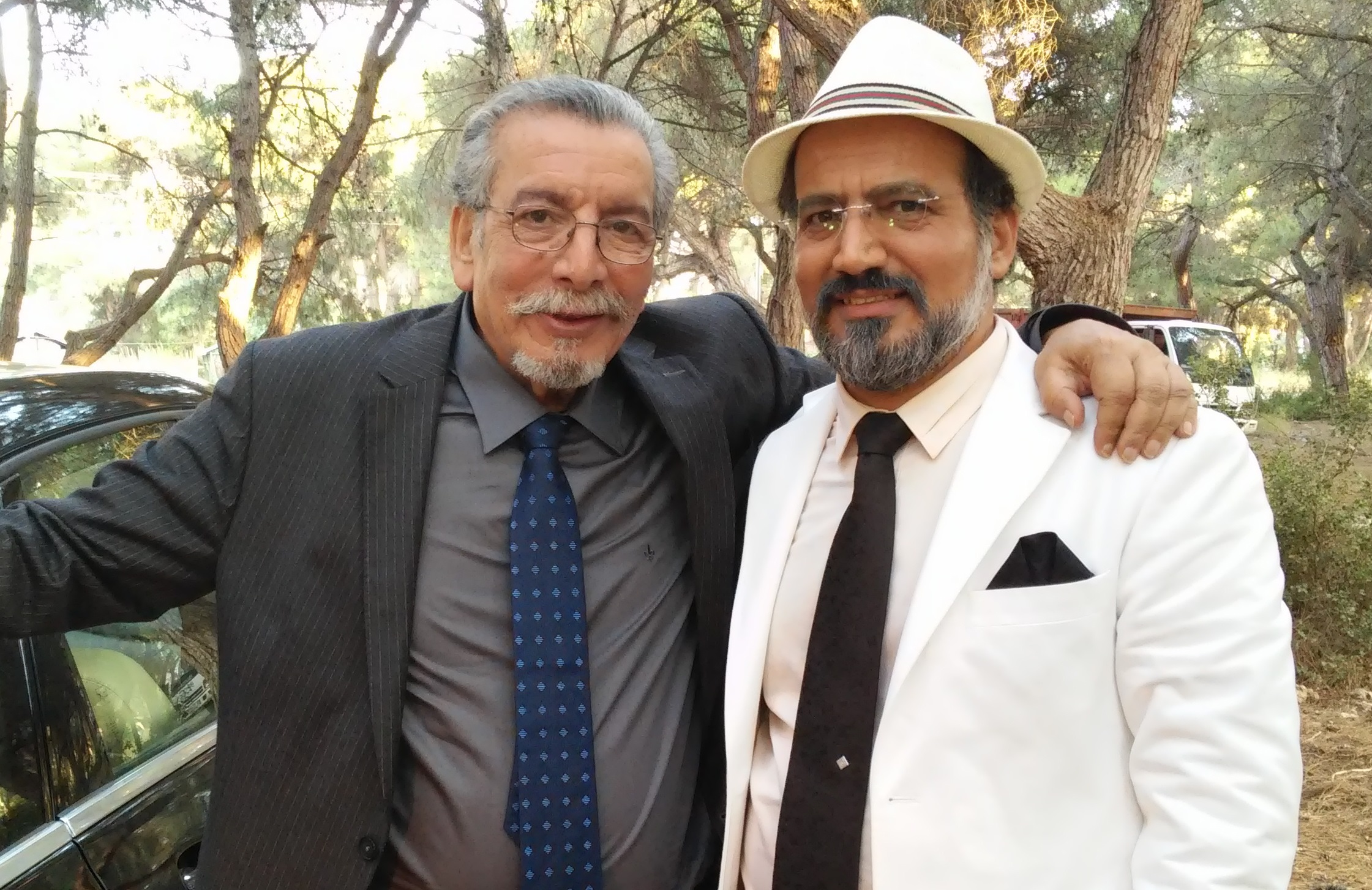
Bahman Mofid and Attar behind the scenes of series Rough Land, Antalya Turkey, 2016

Year	Title	Role	Director
1992	Rainy Night	Older brother	Majid Hamed
2011	The Last rainy dream	Police Maj.	Adin Attar
2012	Like Glass	University professor	Javad Mozdabadi
2012	Once Upon a Time	In two roles	Abolfazl Ahmadian
2015	The testing season	Kazem Karimi	Navid Torabi
2016	Roulette	Ata Gunesh	Mohsen Rabiei
2016	Rough Land	Bahram	Mohammad Ravandi
2016	Beautiful City	Tooraj Jamali	Mehdi Mazloumi
2016	Borderline	Doctor Parsa	Ahmadreza Garshasbi

== Awards ==
Year	Film	Award	Festival
1987	ROOTS IN DEPTH	Best Scriptwriter	2nd Youth Film Festival in Khorassan
1987	THE RINGING OF MY BELL	Best Director	2nd Youth Film Festival in Khorassan
1987	THE BURNED EARTH	Best Film Editor	2nd Youth Film Festival in Khorassan
1987	ROOTS IN DEPTH	Second Prize for the filmscript	Fajr Artistic and Cultural Competitions
1988	THE RINGING OF MY BELL	Best Scriptwriter	6th Iranian National Youth Film Festival, Tehran
1988	THE RINGING OF MY BELL	Candidate of the Best Editor & Director	6th Iranian National Youth Film Festival, Tehran
1989	TO THE DUST AGAIN	Best Scriptwriter	7th Iranian National Youth Film Festival, Tehran
1990	TO THE DUST AGAIN	Best Film	Danobiale International Film festival, Austria (scriptwriter)
1990	TO THE DUST AGAIN	Best Film	Eskopie International Film Festival Skopje Film Festival, Yugoslavia (scriptwriter)
1991	TO THE DUST AGAIN	Best Film	Igualada International Film Festival, Spain (scriptwriter)
2000	THE LAW OF KARMA	Best Film	Youth's Film Festival, Khorassan
2005	THE LAW OF KARMA	Best Film	Fajr International Film Festival (Khorassan Province), Iran

== See also ==
- List of Iranian film directors
