= Iran Documentary =

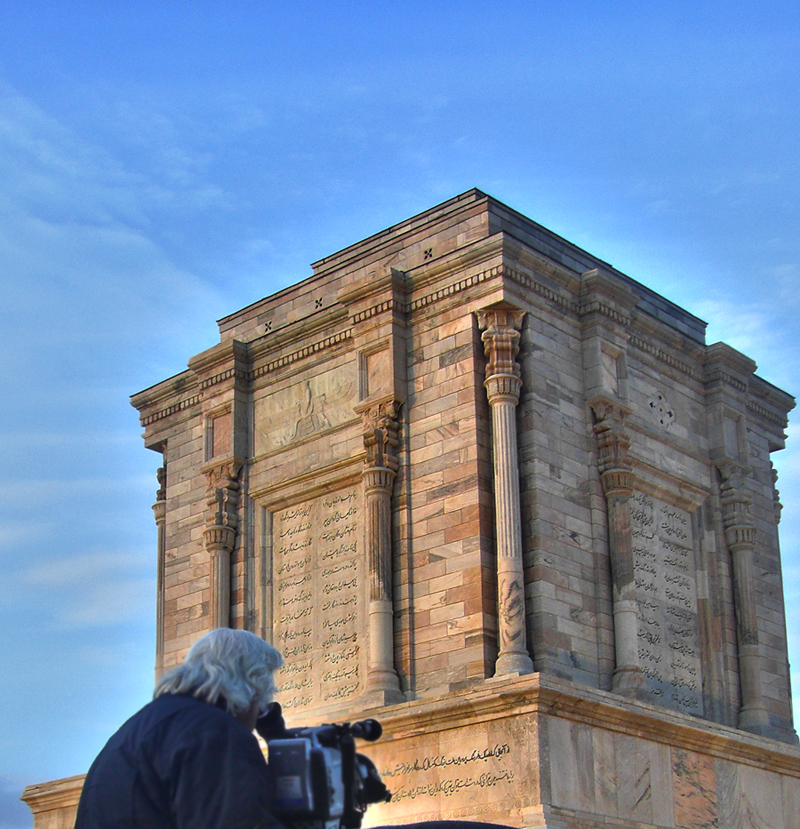
- Backstage of Iran Documentary in Mashhad
- Genre: Documentary
- Written by: Farhad Tohidi; Mohammad Ebrahimian
- Directed by: Hamid Mojtahedi; Rajab Ali Jahanbin
- Presented by: Chante Hinds; Chitra Latifi (in 4 seasons)
- Narrated by: Behrouz Razavi; Bahram Zand
- Composers: Sadegh Cheraghi; Ali Derakhshan
- Country of origin: Iran
- Original languages: Persian; English
- No. of seasons: 11 aired

Production
- Running time: 30 minutes
- Production company: IRIB

Original release
- Network: IRIB1; Jame Jam 1
- Release: 2004 – 2010

Related
- The Damavand; Iranian Churches

Iran Documentary (in Persian: Mostanad-e-Iran) is a 2004 television series produced by the IRIB and directed by Hamid Mojtahedi that shows the beauties of Iran and its history.

== Background ==
In 2004 Iran Television started to air a documentary that was different from other tourism and historical documentaries shown in the past. This documentary started a new method in filming, directing and camera view for documentaries. It received much feedback that showed Iran Documentary was welcomed by people. Then production of the next seasons of documentary started.

== Filming ==
The first series contained 4 seasons that was Tehran in 4 episodes, Isfahan in 4 episodes, Kashan in 2 episodes and Persepolis (Takht-e-Jamshid) in 4 episodes. In 2006 with a gap in making the documentary, the filming of the next series started and so Shiraz aired in 9 episodes.

Making the next series of Iran Documentary started with Mashhad in 2009. By this season the documentary filming continued by a special Full HD camera. So the Mashhad season aired in Nowruz of 2010 in 7 episodes. Then filming of Qom started in spring and its 7 episodes were aired in June 2010. After Qom, Yazd showed in 14 parts in 2011 Nowruz and Kerman was aired in autumn of 2011 in 11 episodes.

Ardebil produced in 4 parts and aired in June 2012, and then Lorestan shows started in 4 episodes.

== Specifications ==
The unique property of Iran Documentary is its point of view. The camera walks as a human among the monuments and nature to show their beauties. This gentle walking method then was imitated in many documentaries.

Great aerial shots and imperial lightning is another property that is unique to Iran Documentary.

Another thing is Golden Time that shows landscapes in twilight and creates great scenes.

== Research ==
Research is one of the important parts in Iran Documentary and as the director said, the camera doesn't walk in any places without suitable research.

== Music ==
The accompaniment of picture and music helps to make wonderful scenes and an Iranian feeling. In any locations its folk music has been used.
