= Joseph Vaezian =

- Born: 1918; Kermanshah, Iran
- Died: 2001 (aged 82–83)
- Occupations: Film producer and director

Joseph Vaezian (Armenian: Ժոզէֆ Վաէզեան; Persian: ژوزف واعظیان) was an Iranian Armenian film producer and director.

== Biography ==
Vaezian was born in 1918 in the city of Kermanshah. He was a businessman before turning to cinema. Having an interest in art, he co-founded, with Aramais Aghamalian, Arman, and Samuel Khachikian, the Armenian Troup Theater in 1947. Ten years later he set up «Azhir Film Studio» with Khachikian and Shahrokh Rafie and started a new career as film producer. Storm in Our Town (Khachikian, 1958), produced by him and Rafi'e, was the first of 15 films he produced up to 1967. In the mid 1960s, he left Azhir Film to try his hands in other capacities, and wrote and directed The Wandering Man (1966) which was followed only by two films: Desperados and Fighting the Devil. Vaezian died in 2001, in Tehran.

== Filmography ==
As a producer

- 1964 The Devil Is Knocking
- 1964 The Strike
- 1963 Victim of Sinful Desire
- 1962 Anxiety
- 1962 A Girl Is Screaming
- 1961 One Step to Death
- 1961 The Neighborhood Kids
- 1960 Lovers' Spring
- 1959 The Hill of Love
- 1959 In Search of a Groom
- 1958 A Messenger from Heaven

As a director

- 1968 Az-jangozashtegan
