= Ashamed (1950 film) =

1950 film

- Directed by: Esmail Koushan
- Written by: Ali Kasmaie
- Produced by: Esmail Kushan
- Cinematography: Nuri Habib
- Production company: Pars Film
- Release date: 27 December 1950
- Running time: 120 minutes
- Country: Iran
- Language: Persian

Ashamed (Persian: شرمسار, romanized: Sharmsār) is a 1950 Iranian drama film directed by Esmail Kushan.

== Cast ==
- Abdullah Baghaie
- Alexander Bijanian
- Hossein Daneshavar
- Delkash
- Mohammad Ali Zarandi

== Bibliography ==
- Mohammad Ali Issari. Cinema in Iran, 1900-1979. Scarecrow Press, 1989.
