= Mahmoud Koushan =

Iranian cinematographer (1932–2021)

Mahmoud Koushan (or Mahmoud Kushan) (1932 – 3 February 2021) was one of the pioneer Iranian cinematographers. He was born in Tehran in 1933, and was the brother of filmmaker Esmail Koushan.

He was the first Iranian filmmaker who went to Italy and Germany for technical training at Cinecittà Studios, Agfa Laboratories and Arriflex Cameras. He worked as a Lab Technician, Sound Recordist, Editor, Assistant Camera and Gaffer before he shot his first film, Amir Arsalan, as cinematographer in 1955.

He directed his first film, Nouveau Riche in 1961 and was the first to shoot Iranian CinemaScope & color feature films. Broken Spell (1958) was recognized at the Berlin Film Festival for his color cinematography. He won Best Cinematography for Joseph and Zoleika at the Sepas Film Festival in 1968.

He was banned from working as a filmmaker after the Iranian 1979 revolution. He has worked on some productions as cinematographer in the early 1990s in Iran.

Mahmoud & Esmail Koushan have family in Arlington Texas & Los Angeles California.
