= Edman Ayvazyan =

Iranian-Armenian painter (1931–2020)

- Էդման Այվազյան ادمان آیوازیان
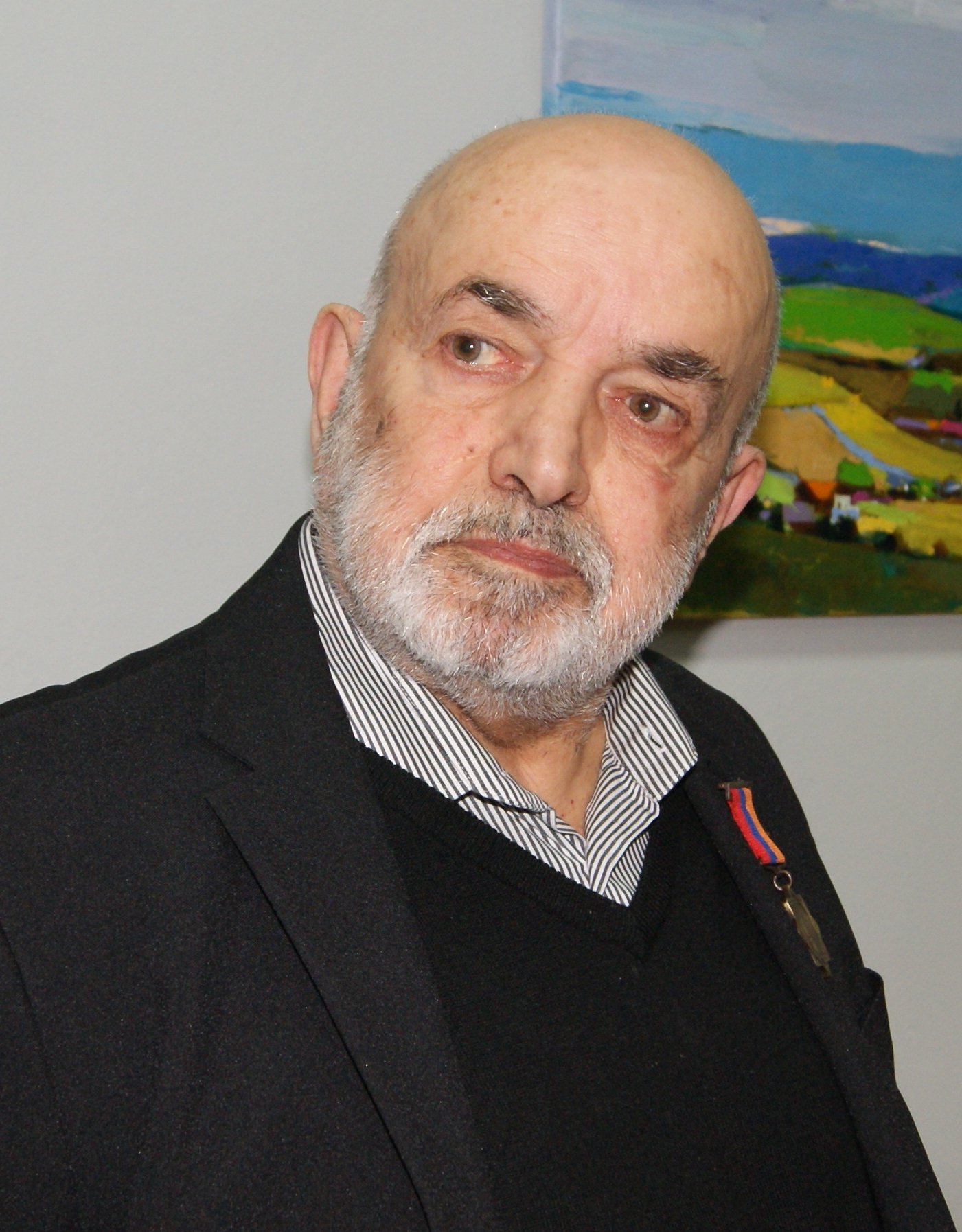
- Born: Edik Ayvazyan; 10 August 1931; Tehran, Iran
- Died: 25 March 2020 (aged 88); London, England, United Kingdom
- Occupations: Painter, architect, fashioner

Edman Ayvazyan (Armenian: Էդման Այվազյան, Persian: ادمان آیوازیان, 10 August 1932 – 25 March 2020) was an Iranian-Armenian painter. He was the first Iranian artist to join the Royal Institute of Oil Painters.

== Biography ==
Edman Ayvazyan was born in Tehran, Iran, in 1932.

Ayvazyan depicted Daredevils of Sassoun, the works of Hovhannes Tumanyan, and created many portraits, landscapes, and seascapes. His works can be found in many churches and museums including the Lazar Gallery, House-Museum of Aram Khachaturian, and in 1982 contributed a major work to the Royal Mosque of King Khalid International Airport, in the form of a marble mosaic band featuring Arabic calligraphy, around the mosque's central dome.

Ayvazyan died on 25 March 2020 in London, England, due to COVID-19.

== Exhibitions ==
From 1950 to 1990 Ayvazyan participated in group and solo exhibitions in Iran, Armenia, the UK and the United States.

- Artists' Union of Armenia, Yerevan, 1987
- Ararat club, Tehran
- "Colors of homeland", Yerevan, National Gallery of Armenia, 2015

== Awards ==
- Arshil Gorki medal of Armenia Ministry of Diaspora, 2015.
