= Hassan Farsam =

Iranian academic

Hassan Farsam (September 27, 1932 in Tehran – February 5, 2016) was an Iranian pharmacist and medical chemist. He studied pharmacy at Tehran University and became a medical chemistry specialist in 1960. Farsam received post doctorate in Pharmaceutical Chemistry from Paris University (1964) and University of California (1988). He was a Professor of Medical Chemistry in Faculty of Pharmacy of Tehran University of Medical Sciences. He was also a permanent member of the Iranian Academy of Medical Sciences.
