= Broken Spell (film) =

1958 film

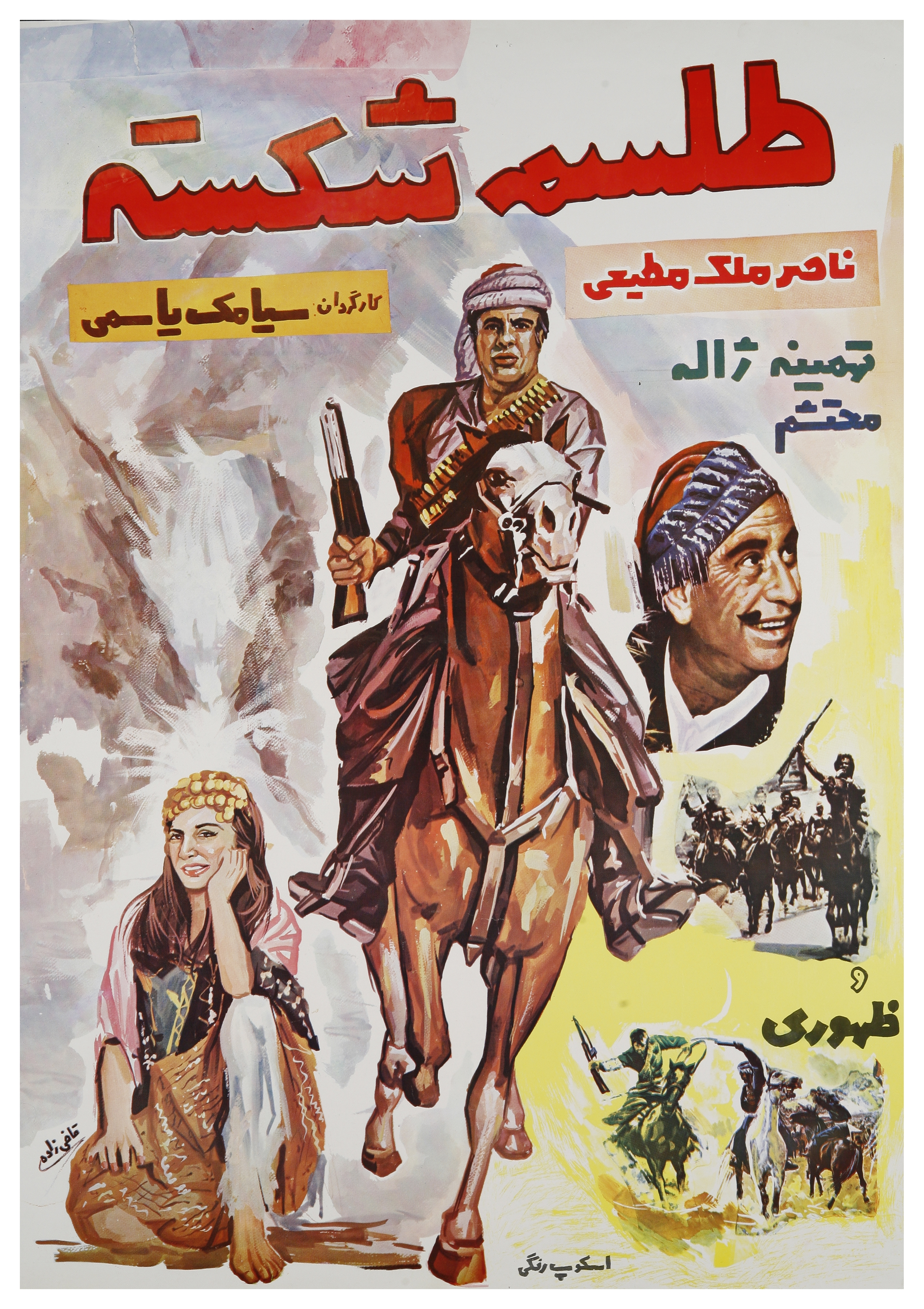
- Theatrical release poster
- Directed by: Siamak Yasemi
- Written by: Ibrahim Zamani
- Produced by: Esmail Koushan
- Starring: Naser Malek Motiei
- Cinematography: Mahmoud Kushan
- Release date: 5 August 1958
- Running time: 91 minutes
- Country: Iran
- Language: Persian

Broken Spell (Persian: سیامک یاسمی Telesme schekasté) is a 1958 Iranian drama film directed by Siamak Yasemi. It was entered into the 9th Berlin International Film Festival.

== Cast ==
- Naser Malek Motiei
- Nostratollah Mohtashem
- Taghi Zohouri
