= Abdolkarim Hasheminejad =

Iranian cleric (1932-1981)

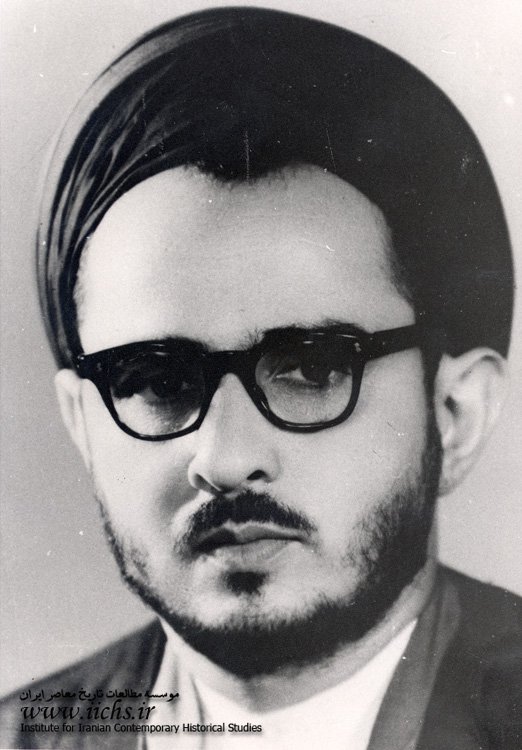
Adolkarim Hasheminejad before the Iranian Revolution

Sayyid Abdolkarim Hasheminejad (Persian: سیّد عبدالکریم هاشمی‌نژاد; 27 July 1932 – 29 September 1981) was an Iranian dissident cleric of the Pahlavi regime. He was also a preacher, writer and seminary lecturer who was assassinated after the revolution of 1979.

== Early life ==
Hasheminejad was born in 1932 in the province of Mazandaran. He studied under Ayatollah Koohestani before moving to Qom to further his studies. He held lectures at the "Religious Debate and Criticism Center" run by Hassan Abtahi. He married Abtahi's sister, who died in 2007.

== Education ==
Hasheminejad was a disciple of Ayatollah Seyyed Hossein Borujerdi and Ayatollah Ruhollah Khomeini. He began his higher education at age 27 and reached the rank of ijtihad. He then migrated to Mashhad. He studied many fields apart from religion, holding discussions and classes with young people, especially students, from which some of his books resulted. He was a writer, a passionate and knowledgeable public speaker and a famed Seminary teacher.

== Political activities ==
Hasheminejad was arrested in the June 5, 1963 demonstration in Iran. His second arrest was when he gave a speech on 14 October 1963 against the State Associations Bill, the arrest of Khomeini, as well as the lack of freedom in the country. He resumed political activities and religious meetings after that. He was later arrested once more. In total, he was arrested five times from 1963 and 1978. His last arrest was on June 22, 1978 but, rise of the Islamic Revolution led to his release after one day. Hasheminejad was one of the main instigators of the Islamic Revolution in Mashhad.

== After the revolution ==
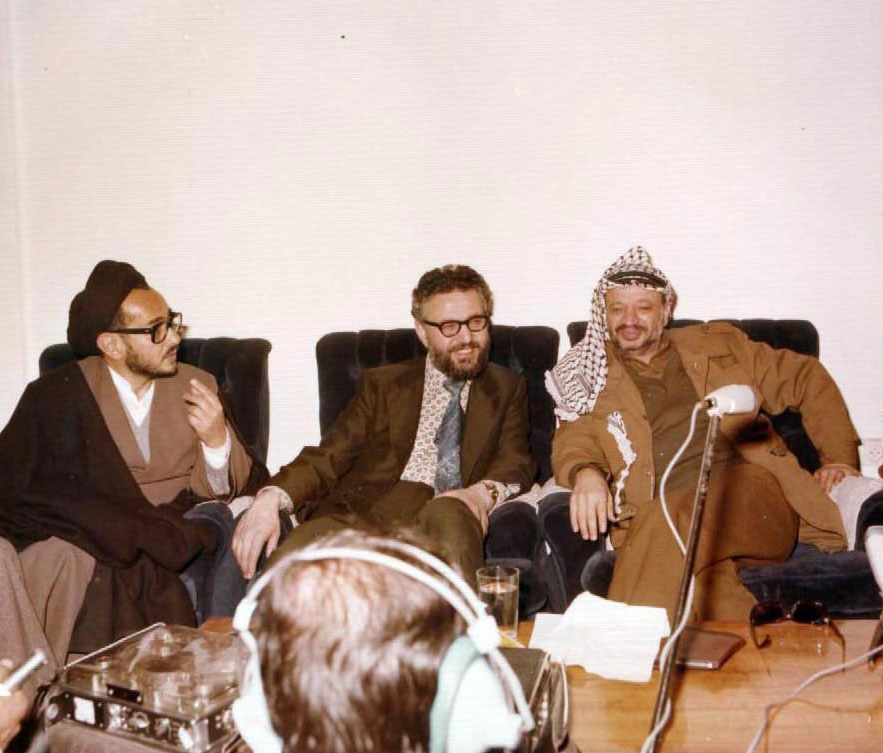
Yasser Arafat in Mashhad, with Ebrahim Yazdi (middle) and Adolkarim Hasheminejad (Left) – February 1979.

After the revolution, he became the first representative of Mazandaran province during the drafting of the Iranian constitution and played an important role in the adoption of important principles. After the revolution, he refused any official capacity. He was party secretary of the Islamic Republican Party in Mashhad.

== Assassination ==
On 30 September 1981, a suicide bomber infiltrated the office of the Islamic Republican Party and assassinated Hasheminejad. He was buried at the shrine of Imam Reza (the eighth Imam of Shia Muslims).
