= Siamak Yasemi =

Iranian filmmaker

- سیامک یاسمی
- Pronunciation: See-yah-mak Yah-sam-ee
- Born: June 1925; Tehran, Iran
- Died: 31 May 1994 (aged 68–69); Tehran, Iran
- Occupations: Film director, screenwriter
- Years active: 1945–1990
- Spouse: Firouzeh Dowlatshahi
- Children: Saghi Yasami, Saghar Yasami, Sharyar Yasami
- Father: Gholamreza Rashid-Yasemi

Siamak Yasemi (Persian: سیامک یاسمی; June 1925 – 31 May 1994) was an Iranian director, screenwriter, producer, and poet. He was the son of Rashid Yasemi. He is known for revolutionizing the cinematic industry in Iran and is considered one of the most successful film makers in Iran.

== Filmography ==
- 1970 Leyli and Majnoon
- 1968 Bar asman neyeshte
- 1968 Tange ejdeha
- 1966 Shamsi pahlevoon
- 1965 Croesus' Treasure (Ganje Gharoon)
- 1965 The Champion of Champions
- 1964 The Pleasures of Sin
- 1964 Mr. Twentieth Century
- 1964 The Seven Month Genius
- 1963 The Shores of Anticipation
- 1963 Horror
- 1962 Incorrigible
- 1961 The Bum
- 1961 Uncle No-Ruz
- 1960 The Strong Man
- 1960 The Spring of Life
- 1958 Broken Spell
- 1958 Naughty But Sweet
- 1955 The Bandit
- 1953 The Nights of Tehran
