= Robert Ekhart =

Robert Ekhart (Armenian: Ռոբերտ Էքհարթ; 1935, in Tabriz – 1994, in Los Angeles) was an Iranian film director, and editor-in-chief.

== Biography ==
Ekhart was born in Tabriz to a German father and Armenian mother. His father was a factory owner in Tabriz and was first disappeared and then killed by Allied troops occupying Iran in September 1940.

In his teens, Ekhart moved to Tehran with his mother and inserted his name in Jahan-e Cinema [World of Cinema Magazine] which led to writing for the monthly Setare Cinema [Movie Star Magazine]. In 1956 he was promoted to its editor-in-chief.

Upon his mother's death, he quit writing for the magazine and traveled, moving to Germany in 1958 where he studied directing and worked in Bavaria Film Studio. He returned to Iran in 1961.

He started Villa Film Studio in Tehran and directed his debut feature, The Big City, in 1962 under the executive production of Babken Avedissian. Ekhart made a handful of films up to 1973, and then focused on importing foreign language films and supplying movie theaters all around the country. His films are Golden Arm, Power of Love, Savage of The Jungles, Price of The Bride, and Folloe Up to Hell.

In 1977 he emigrated to the U.S. and settled in Los Angeles. He died there in the spring of 1994 at the age of 59.
