= Hamid Mojtahedi =

Iranian director (1942–2021)

- حمید مجتهدی
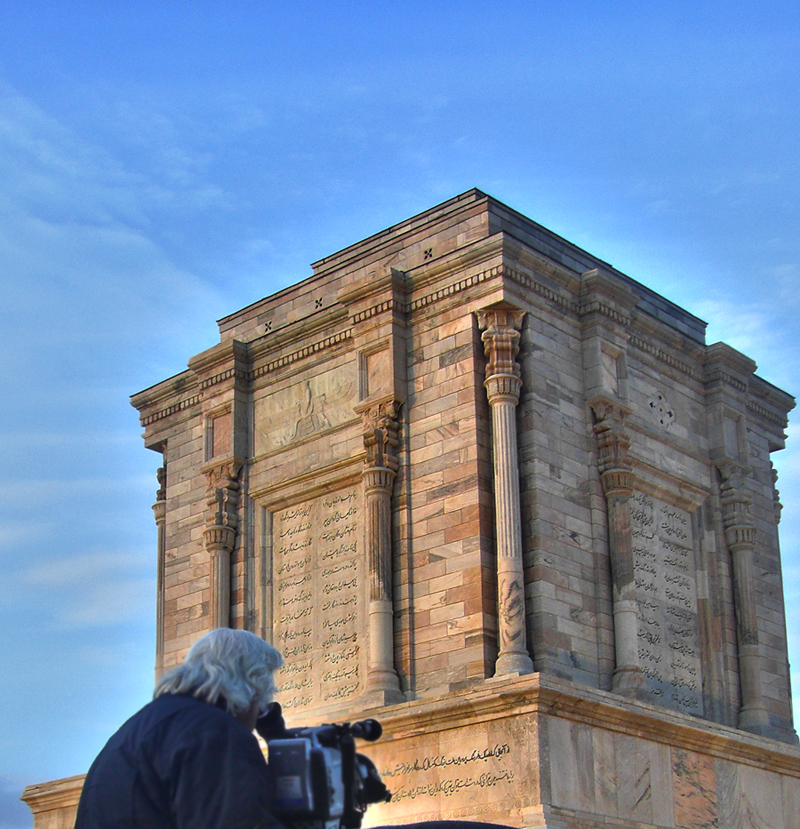
- Hamid Mojtahedi in backstage of Iran Documentary
- Born: 1942; Tehran, Iran
- Died: 23 June 2021 (aged 79); Tehran, Iran
- Occupations: Director, cinematographer, photographer
- Years active: 1965–2021
- Spouses: Soraya Hekmat (divorced): Fatemeh Mahdavinejad
- Children: 2

Hamid Mojtahedi (Persian: حمید مجتهدی) was an Iranian director and cinematographer who is best known for his documentaries.

== Life and career ==
Mojtahedi graduated in cinematography and photography from University of London and after that, specialization on camera and lighting from UCLA.

He has been the cinematographer and producer of some feature films in Iran, USA and Canada.

Mojtahedi is well known for creating the Iran Documentary TV series that shows IRAN in new and pretty shots.

He also was the friend of Moustapha Akkad and has cooperation with him in filming The Messenger and Lion of the Desert.

== Filmography ==
=== Cinematographer ===
1. Beyond the 7th Door (1978)
2. Bar faraz-e asemanha (1980)
3. Mah-e asal (1976)
4. Se nafar rooy-e khat (1976)
5. Kandu (1975)
6. Zabih (1975)
7. Kafar (1972)
8. Sange sabour (1968)
9. Darvazehe Taghdir (1965)

=== Director ===
1. Darvazehe Taghdir (1965)
2. Iran Documentary (2001-20??)

=== Thanks ===
1. Mehman-e-Maman (2004)
