= Soleiman Khan Meykadeh =

Iranian politician (1868–1932)

- سلیمان خان میکده
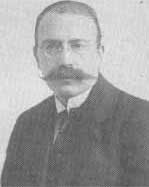

Minister of justice
- In office 27 October 1920 – 4 February 1921

Personal details
- Born: 1868
- Died: 1932 (aged 63–64)
- Parent: Mirza Ali Mostowfi Ashtiani (father)

Soleiman Khan Meykadeh (Persian: سلیمان خان میکده, c. 1868 – c. 1932) was an Iranian politician. A member of the influential Mostowfian Ashtiani family, he served as the minister of justice in the cabinet of Fathollah Khan Akbar. He also served as the governor of several cities including Arak and Nain, the latter of which he represented in the third Iranian parliament.

The Meykade Garden secret society held its meetings in Meykadeh's personal property, hence the name.
