= Aramais Aghamalian =

Armenian-Iranian film director and screenwriter

- Born: 1910; Julfa, Erivan Governorate, Russian Empire
- Died: 1985 (aged 74–75)
- Occupations: Film director and screenwriter

Aramais Aghamalian (Armenian: Արամայիս Աղամալեան, 1910 – 1985) was an Armenian-Iranian film director and screenwriter.

== Biography ==
Aghamalian was born in 1910 in Julfa. He emigrated with his family to Iran after the massacre of Armenians. They settled in Tabriz, but after his elementary school, Aramais went back to Yerevan, where he attended a painting school for four years. On His graduation in 1927, he began to work as decorator, and after three years he went to Germany to follow his studies at the Berlin College of Dramatic Arts, which he had to quit due to financial problems. In 1934 returned to Iran and settled in Isfahan for five years, and later in Tabriz from 1939 to 1945. When in Tabriz, he directed many plays on stage and translated a number of Russian plays into Armenian. In 1946 he moved to Tehran and joined the theater group of Ararat Club. He entered movies in 1960 and directed Searching for The Bridegroom as his debut for Azhir Film Studio. His ten-film career includes The Neighboring Boys, An Angel in My House, Human Beings, Three On Run, and Three-Eyed Ruby. He died in 1985.

== Filmography ==
- 1968 Golagha
- 1965 The Executioner
- 1964 The Street Walker
- 1964 The Humans
- 1963 An Angel in My House
- 1961 The Neighborhood Kids
- 1959 In Search of a Groom
