= Esmail Koushan =

Persian film director (1917–1981)

Esmail Koushan or Kooshan (Persian: اسماعیل کوشان; 1917–1981) was an Iranian film director who was one of the pioneering figures of Persian cinema. He has been called "the father of the Iranian film industry" by Georges Sadoul.

Koushan, who studied film-making in Germany at Universum Film Aktienge-Sellschafe (UFA), began by dubbing foreign-language films into Parsi. He then set up the Mitrafilm company, which produced the first Iranian "talkie" feature film in 1948, The Storm of Life.

== Filmography ==
- The Storm of Life (1948) - producer
- Pretty Foe (1962)

== See also ==
- Iranian cinema
