= Hossein Gharibi =

Iranian diplomat

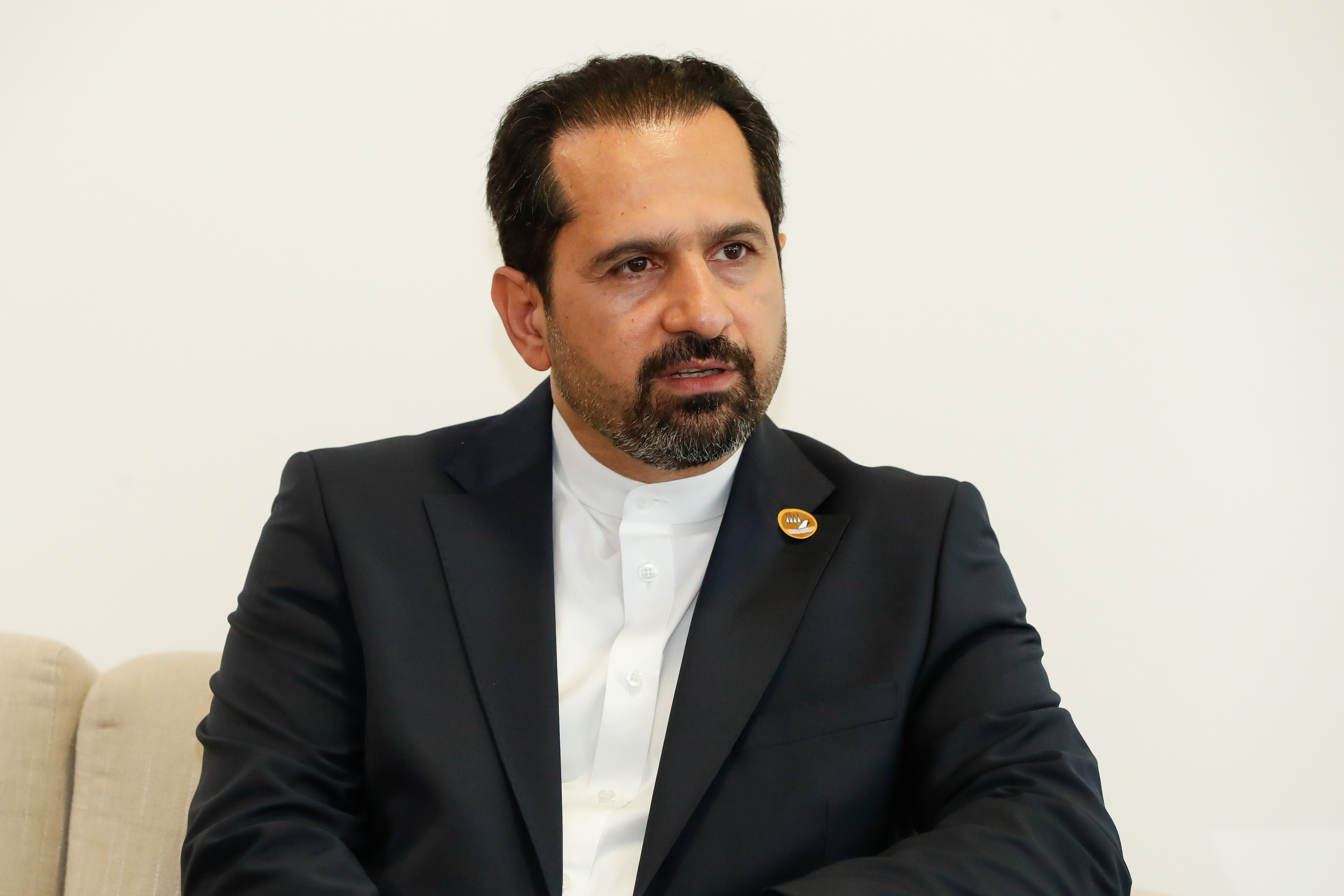

Ambassador of Iran to Brazil
- In office March 2020 – March 2024
- President: Hassan Rouhani Ebrahim Raisi
- Succeeded by: Abdollah Nekounam

Personal details
- Born: Hossein Gharibi حسین قریبی; 14 February 1969 (age 57)
- Education: School of International Relations (BA), (MA); Allameh Tabataba'i University (PhD)

Hossein Gharibi (Persian: حسین قریبی; born 14 February 1969 in Kashan) is an Iranian diplomat who served as the Iranian Ambassador to Brazil from March 2020 to March 2024.

== Early life and education ==
Gharibi earned a B.A. in "Diplomatic Relations" from the School of International Relations in Tehran. He also earned a M.A. in "Diplomacy in International Organizations" from the same school. He earned his Ph.D. in International Relations from Allameh Tabataba'i University in Tehran.

== Career ==
Gharibi served as deputy director of the Center for Diplomatic Training in the Ministry of Foreign Affairs from January 1997 to December 1999.

He then served as Third Secretary at the Iranian Embassy in Rome, Italy from December 1999 to January 2003. From 2000 to 2002, he also acted as an Observer Member to the International Centre for the Study of the Preservation and Restoration of Cultural Property in Rome.

Upon his return to Iran, Gharibi served as an expert on foreign litigations in the Legal Claims Division of the International Legal Department in the Ministry of Foreign Affairs from January 2003 to November 2005. He later went on to become the Head of the Legal Claims Division from November 2009 to March 2012.

From November 2005 to October 2009, Gharibi served as First Secretary in the Permanent Mission of the Islamic Republic of Iran to the United Nations in New York, also acting as an Expert on Development in involvement with United Nations Specialized Agencies.

In addition, Gharibi was a member of the UNICEF Executive Board for two separate terms: 2005 to 2009 and 2012 to 2015.

During his second term in New York, Gharibi held the position of political counselor and Non-Aligned Movement (NAM) Coordinator of legal matters in the Permanent Mission of Iran to the United Nations from March 2012 to December 2015. He was also Vice Chairman of the United Nations General Assembly Sixth Committee in 2014.

From January 2016 to January 2018, Gharibi was an advisor to the Deputy Foreign Minister for Legal and International Affairs.

Prior to being appointed as the Iranian Ambassador to Brazil in 2020, Gharibi was serving as Assistant to the Foreign Minister from January 2018 to March 2020.

== Personal life ==
Gharibi is married and has three children.
