= Ali Mousavi =

Ali Mousavi may refer to:

- Ali Mousavi (footballer)
- Ali Mousavi (diplomat)

== See also ==
- Death of Seyed Ali Mousavi
