= Ramin Mehmanparast =

Iranian diplomat

- رامین مهمان‌پرست
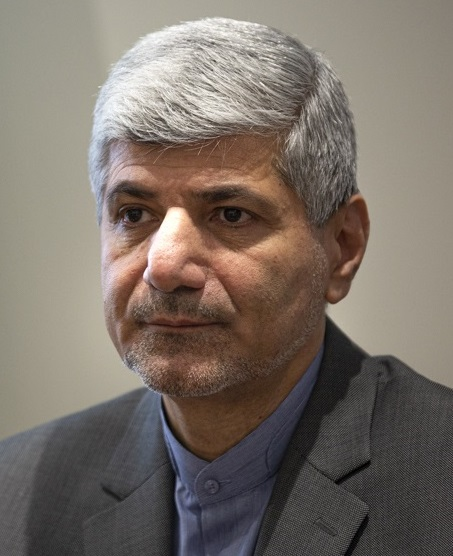

Ambassador of Iran to Poland
- In office 16 March 2014 – 22 July 2018
- President: Hassan Rouhani
- Preceded by: Samad-Ali Lakizadeh
- Succeeded by: Masoud Edrisi

Spokesperson for the Ministry of Foreign Affairs
- In office 12 October 2009 – 11 May 2013
- President: Mahmoud Ahmadinejad
- Preceded by: Hassan Ghashghavi
- Succeeded by: Abbas Araghchi

Ambassador of Iran to Kazakhstan
- In office 2004–2009
- President: Mohammad Khatami

Ambassador of Iran to Thailand
- In office 1996–2000
- President: Akbar Hashemi Rafsanjani

Personal details
- Born: 1960 (age 65–66) Tehran, Iran
- Spouse(s): Fatemeh Yaqubi (deceased) Maryam Kavyani (m. 2018; div. 2021)

Ramin Mehmanparast (Persian: رامین مهمانپرست) is an Iranian diplomat, the former spokesman of the Iranian foreign ministry and the former ambassador to Poland and Lithuania. He was the deputy Minister of Foreign Affairs, the head of the "Center for Public Diplomacy & Media" and the spokesperson of the Ministry of Foreign Affairs from 31 October 2009 until his resignation on 11 May 2013. He was also the ambassador of Iran to Thailand from 1996 to 2000 and Kazakhstan from 2004 to 2009.

After the December 2012 Sandy Hook shooting in the United States, Mehmanparast expressed his condolences to the American people and the victims' families.

Mehmanparast was nominated for 2013 presidential election on 11 May 2013 and left his position as the spokesman of the Iranian Foreign Ministry on the same day. He withdrew from his nomination on 19 May 2013.

== Marriage ==
He married Iranian actress Maryam Kavyani in October 2018.

Diplomatic posts
Preceded by Hassan Ghashghavi	Spokesperson for the Ministry of Foreign Affairs of Iran; 2009–2013	Succeeded by Abbas Araghchi
