= Hassan Ghashghavi =

Iranian politician

- حسن قشقاوی
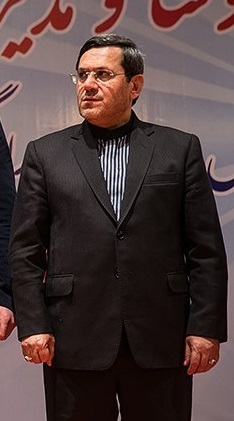
- Hassan Ghashghavi in 2016

Ambassador of Iran to Spain
- In office 13 February 2019 – March 2023
- President: Hassan Rouhani • Ebrahim Raisi
- Preceded by: Mohammad Hassan Fadaifard
- Succeeded by: Reza Zabib

Spokesperson for the Ministry of Foreign Affairs of Iran
- In office 21 July 2008 – 12 October 2009
- President: Mahmoud Ahmadinejad
- Preceded by: Mohammad Ali Hosseini
- Succeeded by: Ramin Mehmanparast

Iranian ambassador to Sweden
- In office September 2004 – June 2008
- Preceded by: 1987-1992: Mehdi Danesh-Yazdi

Representative of the 4th, 6th and 12th Iranian Parliament
- Incumbent
- Assumed office 27 May 2024
- Constituency: Robat Karim and Baharestan
- In office 27 May 2000 – 26 May 2004
- Preceded by: Mohammad Hassan Fadaifard
- Constituency: Robat Karim
- In office 27 May 1992 – 26 May 1996
- Constituency: Shahriar

Iranian ambassador to Kazakhstan
- In office June 1996 – June 2000
- Preceded by: Alireza Bigdeli (Karvard)
- Succeeded by: Morteza Saffari Natanzi

Representative of the 4th session of the Islamic Majlis-ash-Shura And a member of the Foreign Policy Commission
- In office 1993–1997

Personal details
- Born: 22 April 1957 (age 69) Babol, Iran
- Spouse(s): Qashqavi is married and has two children.
- Education: He holds a bachelor's degree from Shahid Beheshti University, and has completed his course in Qom Seminary.

Hassan Ghashghavi or Qashqavi (Persian: حسن قشقاوی) is the current member of Iranian Parliament representing Robat Karim and Baharestan districts since 2024.

He is former Iranian Ambassador to Spain and former Deputy Foreign Minister of Iran from 2009 to 2018. He had previously been Iran's ambassador to Sweden from 2004 to 2008. He previously served as Iran's foreign ministry spokesman.

Diplomatic posts
Preceded by Mohammad-Ali Hosseini	Spokesperson for the Ministry of Foreign Affairs of Iran; 2008–2009	Succeeded by Ramin Mehmanparast
