= Hamid Baeidinejad =

Iranian diplomat

- حمید بعیدی‌نژاد
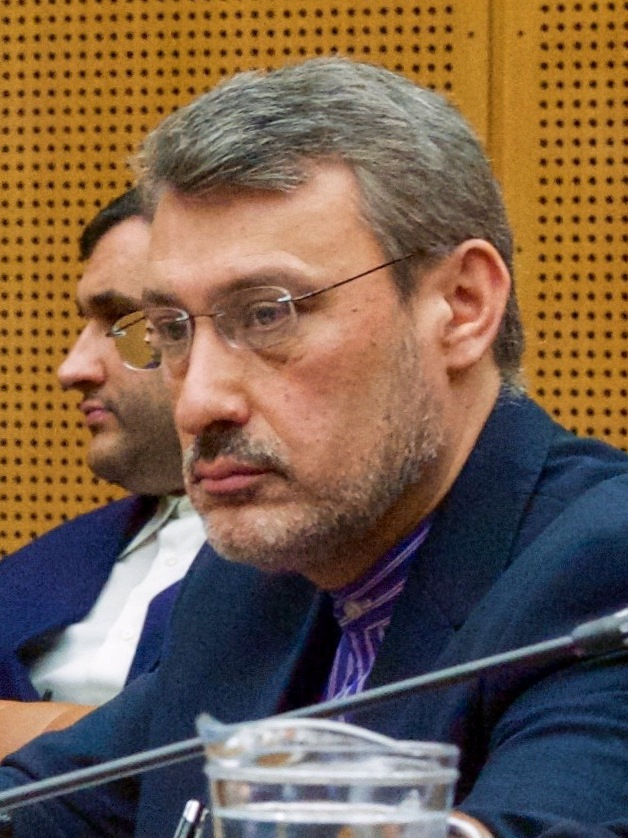

Iranian Ambassador to the United Kingdom
- In office 5 September 2016 – 5 April 2021
- President: Hassan Rouhani
- Minister: Mohammad Javad Zarif
- Preceded by: Rasoul Movahedian
- Succeeded by: Mohsen Baharvand

Director-General for Political Affairs and International Security Affairs, Ministry of Foreign Affairs
- In office 29 August 2013 – 5 September 2016
- Minister: Mohammad Javad Zarif
- Preceded by: Hossein Sheikholeslam
- Succeeded by: TBD

Personal details
- Born: October 11, 1962 (age 63) Tehran, Iran
- Education: School of International Relations
- Awards: Order of Merit and Management (3rd class)

Hamid Baeidinejad (Persian: حمید بعیدی‌نژاد; born 11 October 1962 in Tehran) is an Iranian diplomat who served as the Iranian Ambassador to the United Kingdom from 2016 to 2021. He was formerly the Director-General for Political Affairs and International Security Affairs in the Ministry of Foreign Affairs.

Baeidinejad graduated from the Ministry of Foreign Affair's School of International Relations in 1989. He joined the Ministry of Foreign Affairs the same year and has worked for the ministry ever since, working in the field of disarmament. Baeidinejad served as one of Iran's negotiators in negotiations for curtailing Iran's nuclear program that lead to the Joint Comprehensive Plan of Action in 2015. He previously served in various capacities with Iran's missions to the United Nations, including a term from 2008-2011 as Iran's Ambassador and deputy Permanent Representative to the United Nations Office at Geneva.
