= Esmail Baghaei =

Iranian diplomat (born 1975)

- اسماعیل بقایی
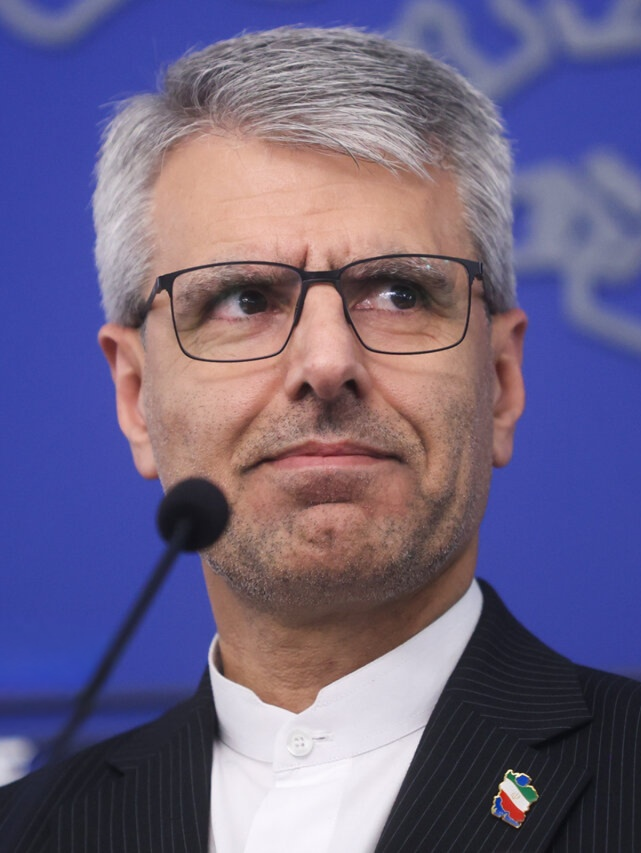
- Baghaei in 2026

Spokesperson for the Ministry of Foreign Affairs of Iran
- Incumbent
- Assumed office 2 October 2024
- Appointed by: Abbas Araghchi
- President: Masoud Pezeshkian
- Preceded by: Nasser Kanaani

Permanent Representative of Iran to the United Nations Office at Geneva
- In office 14 August 2018 – 28 September 2022
- President: Hassan Rouhani; Ebrahim Raisi
- Preceded by: Mohsen Naziri Asl
- Succeeded by: Ali Bahreyni

Personal details
- Born: Esmail Baghaei Hamaneh; 1975 (age 50–51) Yazd, Iran
- Education: University of Tehran; Shahid Beheshti University; School of International Relations

Esmail Baghaei Hamaneh (Note: Persian: اسماعیل بقایی هامانه, romanized: Esmâil Bağâi Hâmâneh) (born 1975) is an Iranian diplomat who has been the Spokesperson for the Ministry of Foreign Affairs of Iran since October 2024. He previously served as a senior assistant to the Iranian foreign minister from 2022 to 2024.

Baghaei holds a law degree and a master's degree in diplomacy and international organisations. He began his career at Iran's Ministry of Foreign Affairs in 2001 as a legal officer at Iran's General Directorate for International Legal Affairs before serving as legal adviser in the Permanent Mission of Iran to the United Nations in New York City from 2006 until 2010. He was Iran's ambassador and Permanent Representative of the Islamic Republic of Iran to the UN Office in Geneva from 2018 until 2022.

== Early life and education ==
Esmail (or Esmaeil) Baghaei Hamaneh was born in 1975 in Yazd, Iran.

He earned an LLM in international law at Shahid Beheshti University, and a master's degree in diplomacy and international organisations at the School of International Relations in Tehran, Iran. Later he was a PhD candidate in public international law at the University of Tehran. From 1999 to 2000, Baghaei took specialised journalism courses in institutions affiliated with the Ministry of Culture and Islamic Guidance.

== Career ==
=== Early career (2001–2010) ===
Baghaei began his career in 2001 as a legal officer at Iran's General Directorate for International Legal Affairs, within the Iranian Ministry of Foreign Affairs. He was responsible for following up on international legal issues related to terrorism, crime, and criminal justice.

Baghaei left for New York City in 2006 as legal adviser in the Permanent Mission of Iran to the UN. During his tenure (2006–2010), he was also the Iranian representative on the UN General Assembly Sixth Committee of the West Asia region. He was also responsible for coordinating the Legal Committee of the Non-Aligned Movement during this time.

=== Iran Ministry of Foreign Affairs roles in Iran and Geneva (2010–2024) ===
Returning to Iran, he was appointed head of the Division for Treaties and International Law within Foreign Affairs. He held the position until 2015, when he was appointed senior adviser to Iran's top negotiator for the Joint Comprehensive Plan of Action.

Baghaei was appointed as Iran's ambassador and Permanent Representative of the Islamic Republic of Iran to the UN Office in Geneva, as well as other international organisations there, from 2018 until 2022. He attended the UN Conference on Trade and Development (UNCTAD) in 2021.

After returning to Tehran, he continued to serve at the Foreign Ministry as an advisor and assistant to the Foreign Minister of Iran, then Hossein Amir-Abdollahian.

=== Spokesperson for Iran Ministry of Foreign Affairs (2024–present) ===
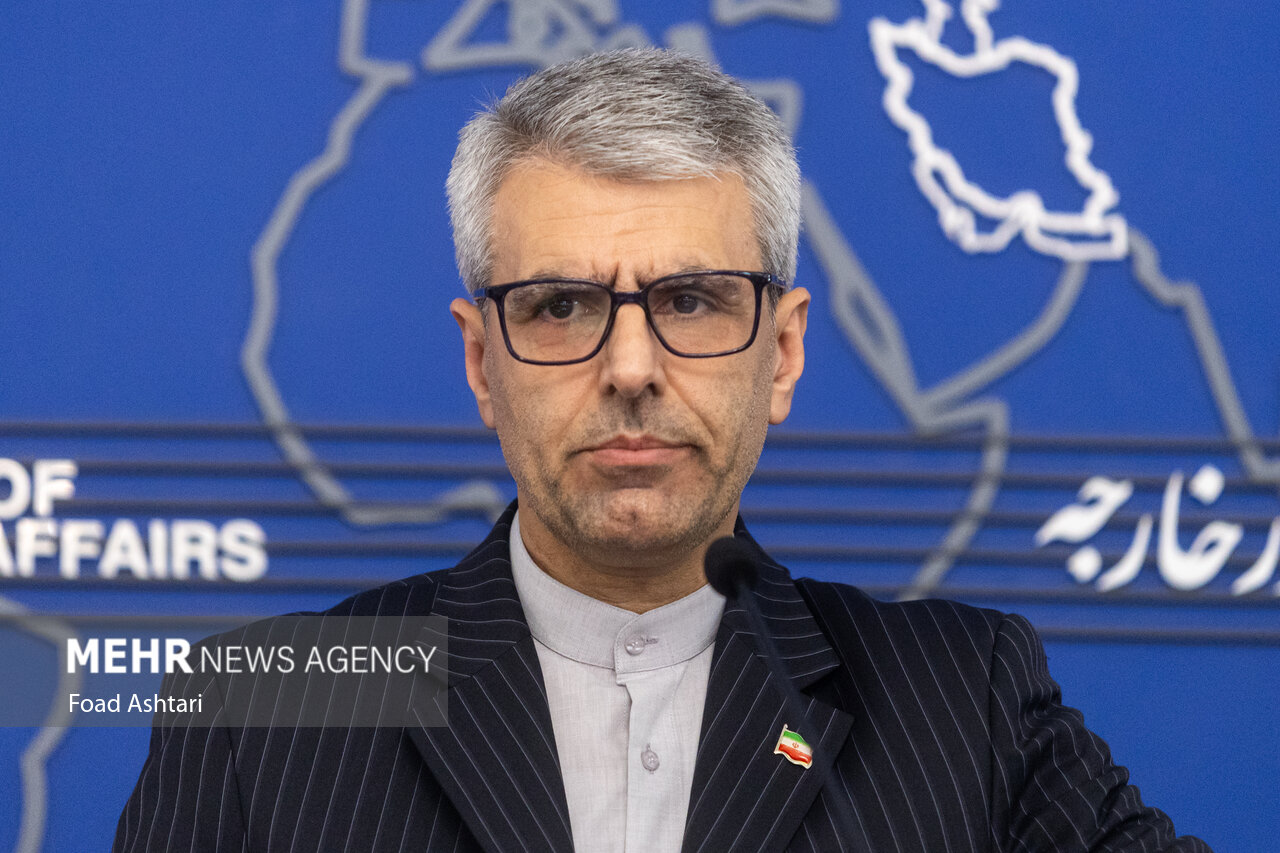
Baghaei during a press conference in April 2025

On 2 October 2024, foreign minister of Iran Abbas Araghchi appointed Baghaei as the spokesman for the Iranian Ministry of Foreign Affairs. He succeeded Nasser Kanaani.

In January 2026, he said that Iran had full confidence in its defensive capabilities in a war, warned that Iran would launch a "regret‑inducing response" if it were attacked, and alluded to Iran's "heroic battle" – his description of the Twelve-Day War in June 2025. On 10 February 2026, he warned that if Iran were attacked by the United States and Israel, Iran would respond with crushing force.

On 28 February 2026, after it was reported (correctly) that Israeli airstrikes had killed Iran's supreme leader Ali Khamenei in Tehran, Baghaei falsely asserted to the press that Khamenei was "safe and sound".

On 19 March 2026, during the 2026 Iran war, Baghaei was interviewed by Sarah Ferguson on the Australian ABC Television current affairs program 7.30. In the interview, he accused the United States and Israel of "terrorist acts" for assassinating Iran's supreme leader Ali Khamenei and other top figures in Iran in what he called an "illegal war" against the country. He also said that Australia's military assets in the Gulf were legitimate targets for Iran to attack in self-defence, without regard to whether they were offensive or defensive Australian military assets, after the Australian Government had deployed a surveillance aircraft along with personnel and defensive air-to-air missiles to the United Arab Emirates. Commenting on the defection of some of the Iran women's national football team members to Australia during the 2026 Asia Cup, he claimed that the players were taken "hostage" by Australia.

After the successful April 2026 U.S. rescue operation in Iran, in which the U.S. military rescued two crew members of an F-15E Strike Eagle who had been shot down over Iran by Iranian forces during the 2026 Iran war, Baghaei claimed that the rescue operation had been "a disaster" for the United States.

On 8 September 2026, Baghaei criticized Canada's support for U.S. led efforts to restore freedom of navigation in the Strait of Hormuz, accusing Ottawa of supporting U.S. military actions against Iran.

== Publications ==
Baghaei has authored or co-authored a number of papers. One paper is titled "The legitimacy of the US military attack on Iraq and Afghanistan", and several are about international terrorism.
