= Mizan (Iranian newspaper) =

Defunct daily newspaper in Iran (1980–1981)

- Front page of the first number
- Type: Daily newspaper
- Editor: Abdolali Bazargan
- General manager: Reza Sadr
- Launched: 7 September 1980
- Ceased publication: 7 June 1981 (ban)
- Political alignment: Freedom Movement of Iran
- Language: Persian
- Headquarters: No. 243, Motahari St., Tehran
- Country: Iran
- OCLC number: 175778651
- Free online archives: Archive

Mizan (Persian: میزان, romanized: Mīzān, lit. 'The scale [of justice]') was an Iranian daily newspaper that was published from 1980 to 1981 as the organ of the Freedom Movement of Iran.

It was one of the most influential publications during that period and was described as the "largest opposition newspaper" in the country at the time it was banned.

== History ==
The first issue of Mizan was published on 7 September 1980. On 18 November 1980, masked men attacked the newspaper's offices. Though they did not reveal their identity, The Washington Post reported that they are believed to be hezbollahi youth who were "acting on an exhortation from Khomeini Sunday to "resist" newspapers with articles reflecting views of those who want to remove the clergy from the political scene".

Mizan extensively covered trial of Abbas Amir-Entezam, who was charged with espionage, and strongly supported his defense arguments. The reports led to lawsuits against the newspaper and charges of publishing "confusing reports... designed to discredit the court". According to The Christian Science Monitor, an editorial in the paper embarrassed judicial authorities when it revealed Amir-Entezam had been charged before any official translation of U.S. embassy documents on which the charges were based, was made.

The newspaper was critical of the hostage crisis and after the Americans were released in January 1981, it slammed handling of the issue by asking why it had not been "resolved sooner and better", and "why is the government and the speaker of parliament calling this a big victory and congratulating each other?". On 27 January 1981, 120 MPs wrote an open letter which said some newspapers were "using every means to poison the mind of the public", referring to Mizan and Enghelab-e-Eslami without explicit naming them.

On 7 April 1981, the prosecutor-general closed down the newspaper and arrested its managing editor. The information ministry also ordered printing companies not to print it. In the last issue published on that day, the newspaper had written in response to the accusations that its "only offense was to raise one basic question: whether the secretary general of a political party should also be chief justice", referring to Mohammad Beheshti who was secretary-general of the Islamic Republican Party.

The newspaper reappeared on the newsstands on 26 April with a pledge to "defend the independence of the judicial system and safeguard the liberties provided in the Constitution and the freedom of the press". However, it was soon banned indefinitely on 7 June 1981 and mobs attacked its main office.

== Political leaning ==
The newspaper claimed in its first editorial that it should not be considered the official organ of the Freedom Movement, and it does not belong neither to left-wing nor right-wing, rather would choose a moderate course as its name, Mizan, suggests. Orientation of the publication was described as "liberal" and "relatively moderate". It was under constant attack from fundamentalists as well as communists like Tudeh Party of Iran. Polemics of Mardom, Tudeh's official newspaper, constituted a regular topic on the newspaper. It also sided with president Abolhassan Banisadr. Mizan occasionally printed statements from the People's Mujahedin.

== Staff ==
Reza Sadr was the managing editor of Mizan while Abdolali Bazargan served as its editor. The newspaper regularly published articles by progressive clerics and figures associated with the Freedom Movement. Among contributors to the paper were Ezatollah Sahabi, Mohammad-Mehdi Jafari and Ebrahim Yazdi.
