= Parviz C. Radji =

Iranian diplomat (1936–2014)

Parviz Camran Radji
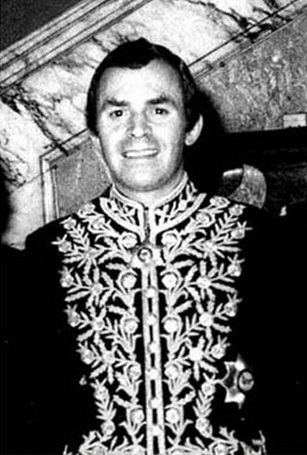

Ambassador of Iran to the United Kingdom
- In office 1976–1979
- Monarch: Mohammad Reza Pahlavi
- Preceded by: Amir Khosrow Afshar
- Succeeded by: Mahmoud Mohammadi

Personal details
- Born: October 16, 1936 Tehran, Pahlavi Iran
- Died: March 23, 2014 (aged 77) London, United Kingdom
- Spouse: Goli Partovi
- Relatives: Abdulhossein Radji (father)
- Education: University of Cambridge

Parviz Camran Radji ((Persian: پرویز‌ کامران راجی) 16 October 1936, Tehran – 23 March 2014, London) was an Iranian diplomat and the last ambassador in London, under Shah Mohammad Reza Pahlavi.

== Life ==
Radji was the son of an orthopedic surgeon born in 1936 in Tehran. After finishing elementary school in Tehran, Radji attended Alborz High School in Tehran and then The Hill School in the United States. After graduation from high school he studied economics at Trinity Hall, Cambridge. Back in Iran, he began his career in 1959 at National Iranian Oil Company as a trainee. *By that time Amir-Abbas Hoveyda, future prime minister, who was the director of the Administration Department of NIOC appointed Radji as his assistant.

In 1965 Prime Minister Hassan-Ali Mansur was killed in an attack and Hoveyda succeeded him as prime minister. Radji worked four years as private secretary in the office of Hoveyda. Through Hoveyda he met Princess Ashraf Pahlavi, by that time Iran's representative in the Human Rights Commission of the United Nations and was chairman of numerous foundations. From 1970 to 1973 Radji worked in the office of Pahlavi at the Iranian United Nations delegation in New York City. In 1973 Radji returned to Iran and until 1976 he was special adviser to Hoveyda.

From 1976 Radji was sent as the ambassador to London. He served in this position from 4 June 1976 until 26 January 1979 just before the Islamic revolution in Iran. On 16 January 1979, the day Shah Mohammad Reza Pahlavi left Iran, Ahmad Mirfendereski who was the new foreign minister under Prime Minister Shapur Bakhtiar, called Radji and informed him that he no longer was Iranian ambassador in London. He stayed for few days in his office, packed his belongings and permanently left the Embassy on 26 January 1979. After the revolution, Radji did not return to Iran; instead stayed in the United Kingdom.
