= Nasser Kanaani =

Iranian diplomat

- ناصر کنعانی
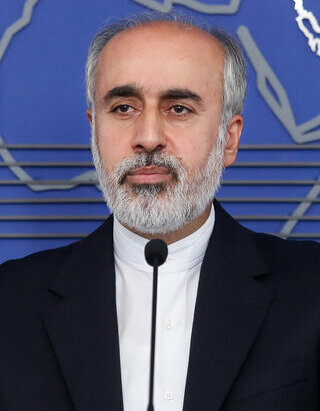
- Kanaani in 2022

Spokesman for the Ministry of Foreign Affairs of the Islamic Republic of Iran
- In office 27 June 2022 – 2 October 2024
- Appointed by: Hossein Amir-Abdollahian
- President: Ebrahim Raisi
- Preceded by: Saeed Khatibzadeh
- Succeeded by: Esmail Baghaei

Personal details
- Born: Langarud, Gilan Province, Iran
- Occupation: Politician; Diplomat
- Profession: Political science and international relations

Nasser Kanaani (Persian: ناصر کنعانی) is an Iranian diplomat and was the spokesman of the Ministry of Foreign Affairs of Iran from 2022 to 2024. He was the head of Iran's interests protection office in Cairo from July 2018 to July 2022.

Kanaani previously served as head of the Iraqi staff of the Ministry of Foreign Affairs, deputy director of the Arab Middle East and North Africa Department and the Iranian ambassador in Jordan. Besides his native Persian, he is fluent in English and Arabic.
