= Seyed Ali Mousavi =

Seyed Ali Mousavi may refer to:

- Ali Mousavi (footballer), Iranian footballer
- Seyed Ali Mousavi, nephew of Iranian politician Mir-Hossein Mousavi, see Death of Seyed Ali Mousavi
- Ali Mousavi (diplomat), Iranian diplomat
