= Spokesperson for the Ministry of Foreign Affairs of Iran =

Iranian Government official

Spokesperson of the Ministry of Foreign Affairs
- سخنگوی وزارت امور خارجه ایران
- Logo of the Iran Ministry of Foreign Affairs

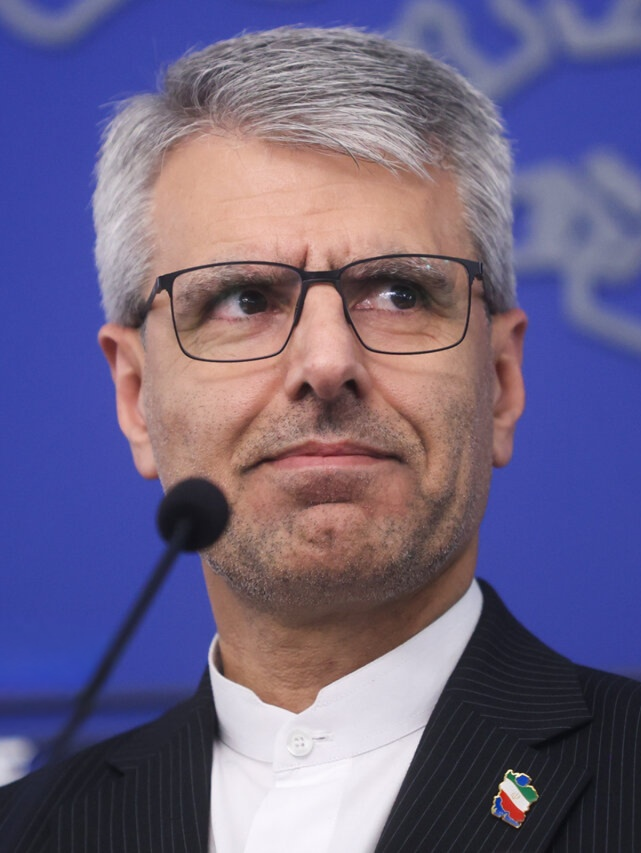
- Incumbent; Esmail Baghaei since 3 October 2024
- Seat: Tehran, Iran
- Appointer: Minister of Foreign Affairs
- Formation: 1982; 44 years ago
- First holder: Morteza Sarmadi

The Spokesperson for the Ministry of Foreign Affairs (Persian: سخنگوی وزارت امور خارجه) is an Iranian Government official whose primary responsibility is to serve as the spokesperson for Iranian Ministry of Foreign Affairs.

== History ==
Until 2011, responsibility for media relations was one of the duties of an independent department of the ministry, the General Directorate of Information and Press, but there was no established position in the ministry for spokespersons, and the spokesperson was appointed as an adviser to the minister or a special assistant to the minister. In September 2011, the responsibility of the spokesperson was defined and the legal status of the head of the Center for Public Diplomacy and Media of the Ministry of Foreign Affairs was appointed as the spokesperson.

== List of spokespeople ==
Tenure	Spokesperson	Minister	Supreme Leader	President
1982 – 1997	Morteza Sarmadi	Ali-Akbar Velayati	Ruhollah Khomeini, Ali Khamenei	Ali Khamenei, Akbar Hashemi Rafsanjani
1992 – 16 November 1998	Mahmoud Mohammadi	Ali-Akbar Velayati	Ali Khamenei	Ali Khamenei, Akbar Hashemi Rafsanjani
1992 – 16 November 1998	Mahmoud Mohammadi	Kamal Kharazi	Ali Khamenei	Akbar Hashemi Rafsanjani, Mohammad Khatami
16 November 1998 – 10 September 2006	Hamid-Reza Assefi	Kamal Kharazi	Ali Khamenei	Akbar Hashemi Rafsanjani, Mohammad Khatami
16 November 1998 – 10 September 2006	Hamid-Reza Assefi	Manouchehr Mottaki	Ali Khamenei	Mahmoud Ahmadinejad
10 September 2006 – 21 July 2008	Mohammad Ali Hosseini	Manouchehr Mottaki	Ali Khamenei	Mahmoud Ahmadinejad
21 July 2008 – 12 October 2009	Hassan Ghashghavi	Manouchehr Mottaki	Ali Khamenei	Mahmoud Ahmadinejad
12 October 2009 – 11 May 2013	Ramin Mehmanparast	Manouchehr Mottaki	Ali Khamenei	Mahmoud Ahmadinejad
12 October 2009 – 11 May 2013	Ramin Mehmanparast	Ali Akbar Salehi	Ali Khamenei	Mahmoud Ahmadinejad
11 May 2013 – 30 August 2013	Abbas Araghchi (Acting)	Ali Akbar Salehi	Ali Khamenei	Mahmoud Ahmadinejad
1 September 2013 – 8 November 2015	Marzieh Afkham	Ali Akbar Salehi	Ali Khamenei	Mahmoud Ahmadinejad
1 September 2013 – 8 November 2015	Marzieh Afkham	Mohammad Javad Zarif	Ali Khamenei	Hassan Rouhani
8 November 2015 – 19 June 2016	Hossein Jaberi-Ansari	Mohammad Javad Zarif	Ali Khamenei	Hassan Rouhani
19 June 2016 – 12 April 2019	Bahram Ghasemi	Mohammad Javad Zarif	Ali Khamenei	Hassan Rouhani
12 April 2019 – 16 August 2020	Abbas Mousavi	Mohammad Javad Zarif	Ali Khamenei	Hassan Rouhani
16 August 2020 – 27 June 2022	Saeed Khatibzadeh	Mohammad Javad Zarif, Hossein Amir-Abdollahian	Ali Khamenei	Hassan Rouhani, Ebrahim Raisi
27 June 2022 – 2 October 2024	Nasser Kanaani	Hossein Amir-Abdollahian	Ali Khamenei	Ebrahim Raisi
2 October 2024 – Present	Esmail Baghaei	Abbas Araghchi	Ali Khamenei, Mojtaba Khamenei	Masoud Pezeshkian

== See also ==
- Spokesperson of the Government of Iran
