= Bahram Ghasemi =

Iranian diplomat (born 1956)

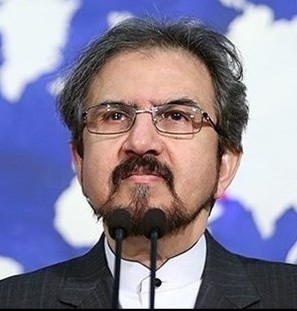

Ambassador of Iran to the France
- In office 2019–2022
- President: Hassan Rouhani Ebrahim Raisi
- Preceded by: Mohammad Taheri
- Succeeded by: Mohammad Amin-Nejad

Spokesperson for the Ministry of Foreign Affairs of Iran
- In office 19 June 2016 – 12 April 2019
- President: Hassan Rouhani
- Preceded by: Hossein Jaberi Ansari
- Succeeded by: Abbas Mousavi

Ambassador of Iran to Italy
- In office 2001–2006

Ambassador of Iran to Spain
- In office 1993–1998

Ambassador of Iran to Ireland
- In office 1987–1990

Personal details
- Born: 1956 (age 69–70) Borujerd, iran
- Occupation: diplomat

Bahram Ghasemi is an Iranian diplomat. He is a former Spokesperson for the Ministry of Foreign Affairs of Iran. He was ambassador of Iran to France from 2019 to 2022.
