= Hamid-Reza Assefi =

Iranian politician

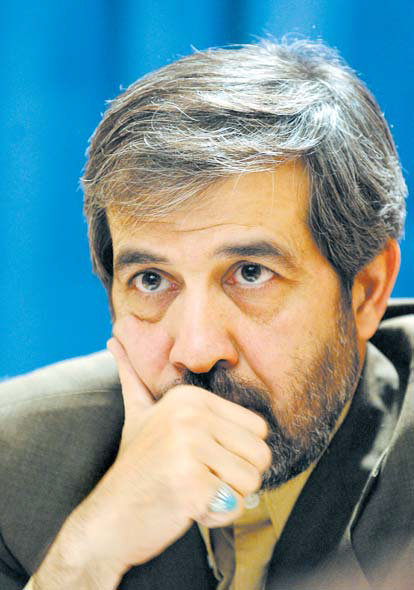
- Hamid-Reza Assefi on June 23, 2003

Ambassador of Iran to United Arab Emirates
- In office 2006–2009
- President: Mahmoud Ahmadinejad
- Preceded by: Mohammadi-Ali Najafabadi
- Succeeded by: Mahdi Aghajafari (Chargé d'affaires)

Spokesperson for the Ministry of Foreign Affairs
- In office 16 November 1998 – 10 September 2006
- President: Mohammad Khatami Mahmoud Ahmadinejad
- Preceded by: Mahmoud Mohammadi
- Succeeded by: Mohammad Ali Hosseini

Ambassador of Iran to France
- In office 1993–1998
- President: Akbar Hashemi Rafsanjani Mohammad Khatami

Ambassador of Iran to East Germany
- In office 1983–1990
- President: Ali Khamenei Akbar Hashemi Rafsanjani

Personal details
- Born: 1952 (age 73–74) Tehran, Imperial State of Iran

Hamid Reza Assefi (Persian: حمیدرضا آصفی) was born in Tehran, Iran. Spokesman, Vice Minister of Parliamentary and Consular Affairs and Communication, and the Special Assistant to the Minister at the Iranian Ministry of Foreign Affairs under President Khatami.

He was an ambassador of Iran during 1994 till 1998. He was also Ambassador of Iran to France during the 1998 World Cup where he gave the Iranian fans flags and posters of the Iranian national football team.

On 12 February 2006, he stated that "I believe the crimes committed by the Zionist regime are greater than the Holocaust. Unfortunately, the Zionist regime is blackmailing the Europeans with the Holocaust."

Speaking about Baghdad bridge stampede that occurred on 31 August 2005 when up to 1,000 people died he said: "[Iran offers its] condolences and sympathy with the Iraqi people and government. Suspicious hands are involved in conspiracies to incite violence and bloodshed among the different Iraqi groups and tribes so that they disturb the security and calm of the Iraqi people"

He was Iran's ambassador to the United Arab Emirates.

Diplomatic posts
Preceded by Mahmoud Mohammadi	Spokesperson for the Ministry of Foreign Affairs of Iran; 1998–2006	Succeeded by Mohammad Ali Hosseini
