= Mohsen Baharvand =

Iranian diplomat

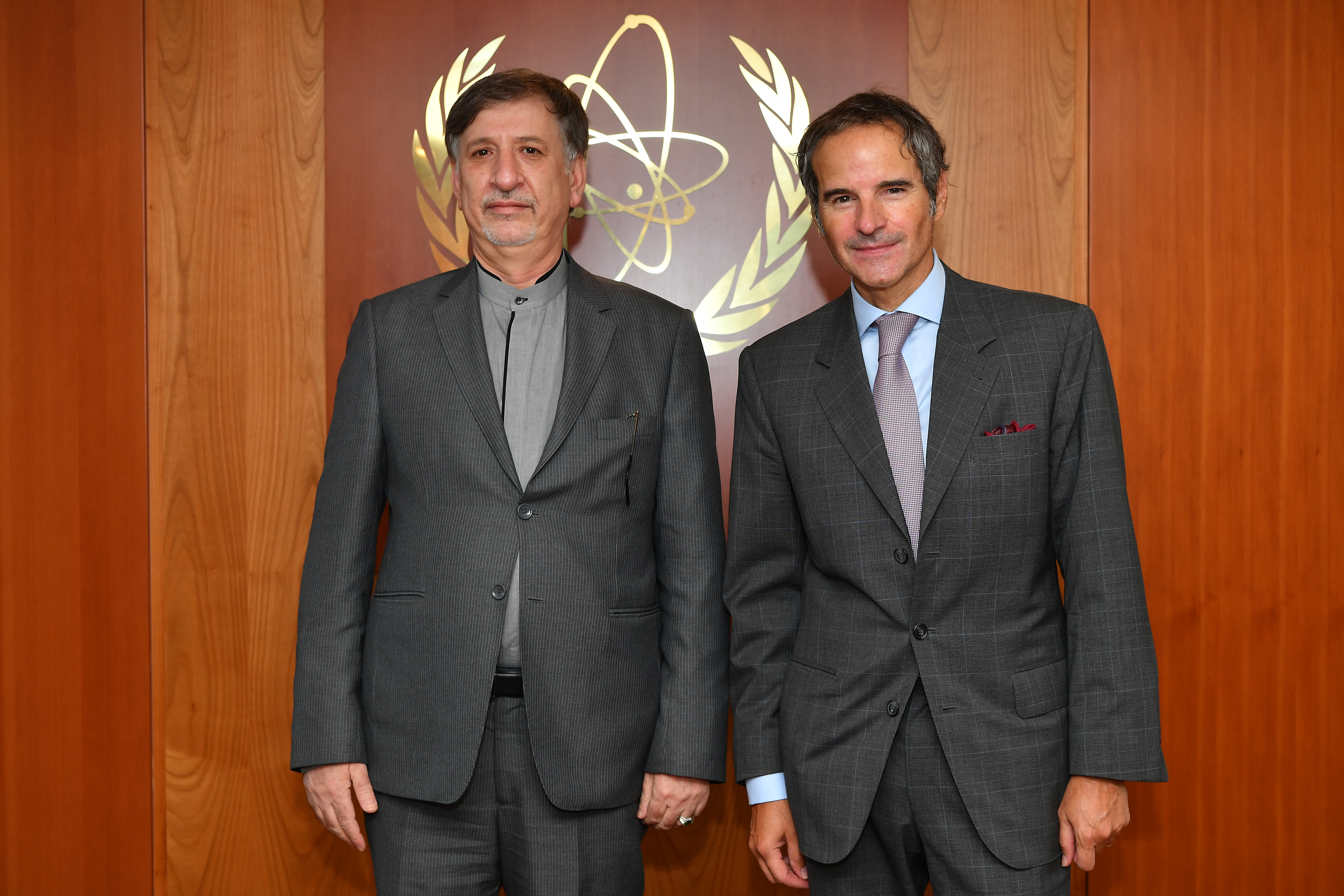
- Mohsen Baharvand in 2021

Ambassador of Iran to United Kingdom
- In office July 2021 – February 2022
- President: Hassan Rouhani Ebrahim Raisi
- Preceded by: Hamid Baeidinejad
- Succeeded by: Mehdi Hosseini Matin (Chargé d'affaires)

Personal details
- Born: April 4, 1966 (age 60) Khorramabad, Iran
- Education: School of International Relations in Tehran Shahid Beheshti (National) University
- Occupation: Diplomat

Note: Mohsen Baharvand (April 4, 1966) is an Iranian diplomat who served as ambassador of Iran to United Kingdom from July 2021 to February 2022. In February 2022, Baharvand organized an event to celebrate the 43rd anniversary of the Islamic Revolution. A video circulated showing an embassy reception in London. A woman playing piano alongside a male violinist and several other women were not wearing their hijab, despite the hijab being required in Iran. After the video circulated, he was ordered back to Tehran by the Foreign Ministry and was removed from position as diplomat.

== Early life and education ==
Baharvand was born in Khorramabad, Iran, on April 4, 1966. In 1989–1993, he studied at the School of International Relations in Tehran, Iran. In 2010–2012, he received an M.A. in Human Rights Law from the Faculty of Law in Shahid Beheshti (National) University.

== Career ==
From 1994 to 1995, Baharvand worked as a Legal Counsel at the Ministry of Foreign Affairs' Legal Affairs Division. He worked as a deputy director of the Ministry of Foreign Affairs' Legal Affairs Division from 1995 to 1996. He was a member of Iran's Permanent Mission in Geneva from 1996 until 2000. He served as Director of the Ministry of Foreign Affairs' Legal Affairs Division from 2001 until 2005. From 2006 to 2009, he was the Chargé d'affaires and Head of the Islamic Republic of Iran's Embassy in Buenos Aires. He served as the Ministry of Foreign Affairs Deputy Director-General for Latin American Countries from 2009 to 2014. He was the Deputy Secretary-General of the Asian African Legal Consultative Organization from 2014 to 2022.
