= List of current ambassadors from Iran =

This is a list of ambassadors from Iran

== Current Iranian ambassadors ==
Host country	Location	Ambassador
Afghanistan	Kabul	Hassan Kazemi Qomi
Albania	Tirana	Vacant
Algeria	Algiers	Mohammad-Reza Babaei
Angola	Luanda	Mansour Shakib-Mehr Dual accreditation
Argentina	Buenos Aires	Amir Houshang Karimi Chargé d'affaires
Armenia	Yerevan	Mahdi Sobhani
Australia	Canberra	Ahmad Sadeghi
Austria	Vienna	Asadollah Eshragh Jahromi
Azerbaijan	Baku	Vacant
Bahrain	Manama	Vacant
Bangladesh	Dhaka	Mansour Chavoshi
Belarus	Minsk	Alireza Sanei
Belgium	Brussels	Mohammad Ali Robatjazi
Belize	Belmopan	Vacant
Benin	Porto-Novo	Ali Tiztak Dual accreditation
Bolivia	La Paz	Bahram Shahaboddin
Bosnia and Herzegovina	Sarajevo	Abuzar Ebrahimi Torkaman
Botswana	Gaborone	Vacant
Brazil	Brasília	Abdollah Nekounam
Brunei	Bandar Seri Begawan	Mohammad Taghi Rajabi
Bulgaria	Sofia	Alireza Irvash
Burkina Faso	Ouagadougou	Mojtaba Faghihi
Burundi	Gitega	Majid Saffar Dual accreditation
Cameroon	Yaoundé	Vacant
Cambodia	Phnom Penh	Vacant
Cape Verde	Praia	Hassan Asgari Dual accreditation
Chad	N'Djamena	Ali Tiztak Dual accreditation
Chile	Santiago	Mahmoud Babaei Chargé d'affaires
China	Beijing	Mohsen Bakhtiar
Colombia	Bogotá	Ahmadreza Kheirmand
Croatia	Zagreb	Amir-Hossein Gharibnejad
Cuba	Havana	Zabihollah Naderi
Cyprus	Nicosia	Alireza Salarian
Czech Republic	Prague	Seyed Majid Ghafeleh Bashi
Democratic Republic of the Congo	Kinshasa	Amir Hosseini
Denmark	Copenhagen	Mohammad Reza Sajjadi
Dominican Republic	Santo Domingo	Vacant
Ecuador	Quito	Saadat Aghajani
Egypt	Cairo	Mohammad Hossein Soltanifard Head of Iran's Interest Section in Cairo
Estonia	Tallinn	Vacant
Eswatini	Mbabane	Vacant
Eritrea	Asmara	Vacant
Ethiopia	Addis Ababa	Samad Ali Lakizadeh
Finland	Helsinki	Javad Aghazadeh Khoei
France	Paris	Mohammad Amin-Nejad
Gabon	Libreville	Vacant
Gambia	Banjul	Vacant
Georgia	Tbilisi	Mahmoud Adib
Germany	Berlin	Majid Nili Ahmadabadi
Ghana	Accra	Ali Ghomeshi
Guatemala	Guatemala City	Alireza Ghezili Dual accreditation
Guinea	Conakry	Jamshid Parvizi
Guinea-Bissau	Bissau	Vacant
Greece	Athens	Malek Hossein Givzad
Haiti	Port-au-Prince	Vacant
Hungary	Budapest	Morteza Moradian
Iceland	Reykjavík	Alireza Yousefi Dual accreditation
India	Delhi	Iraj Elahi
Indonesia	Jakarta	Mohammad Boroujerdi
Iraq	Baghdad	Mohammad-Kazem Ale-Sadegh
Ireland	Dublin	Kazem Sharif Kazemi Chargé d'affaires
Italy	Rome	Mohammad Reza Sabouri
Ivory Coast	Abidjan	Seyed Gholamreza Mirmohammad Meigoni
Jamaica	Kingston	Vacant
Japan	Tokyo	Peyman Saadat
Jordan	Amman	Ali Asghar Naseri Chargé d'affaires
Kazakhstan	Nur-Sultan	Ali Akbar Jokar
Kenya	Nairobi	Ali Gholampour
Kuwait	Kuwait	Mohammad Toutounchi
Kyrgyzstan	Bishkek	Gholamhossein Yadegari
Laos	Vientiane	Nassereddin Heydari Dual accreditation
Latvia	Riga	Hojjatollah Faghani Dual accreditation
Lebanon	Beirut	Mojtaba Amani
Lesotho	Maseru	Vacant
Liechtenstein	Vaduz	Mahmoud Barimani Dual accreditation
Lithuania	Vilnius	Vacant
Liberia	Monrovia	Vacant
Libya	Tripoli	Einollah Souri
Luxembourg	Luxembourg	Mohammad Ali Robatjazi Dual accreditation
Madagascar	Antananarivo	Hassan Ali-Bakhshi
Malawi	Lilongwe	Vacant
Malaysia	Kuala Lumpur	Valiollah Mohammadi Nasrabadi
Maldives	Malé	Alireza Delkhosh Dual accreditation
Mali	Bamako	Mahmoud Khani-Jooyabad
Malta	Valletta	Mohammad Reza Sabouri Dual accreditation
Mauritania	Nouakchott	Javad Abu
Mauritius	Port Louis	Hassan Ali-Bakhshi Dual accreditation
Mexico	Mexico City	Abolfazl Pasandideh
Mongolia	Ulaanbaatar	Mohsen Bakhtiar Dual accreditation
Moldova	Chișinău	Vacant
Monaco	Monaco City	Mohammad Amin-Nejad Dual accreditation
Montenegro	Podgorica	Vacant
Morocco	Rabat	Vacant
Mozambique	Maputo	Mansour Shakib-Mehr Dual accreditation
Myanmar	Naypyidaw	Nassereddin Heydari Dual accreditation
Namibia	Windhoek	Ali Sharifi Sadati
Nepal	Kathmandu	Iraj Elahi Dual accreditation
Netherlands	The Hague	Hadi Farajvand
New Zealand	Wellington	Reza Nazarahari
Nicaragua	Managua	Ramin Zare
Niger	Niamey	Ali Tiztak
Nigeria	Abuja	Gholamreza Mahdavi Raja
North Korea	Pyongyang	Abbas Talebifar
North Macedonia	Skopje	Alireza Irvash Dual accreditation
Norway	Oslo	Alireza Yousefi
Oman	Muscat	Mousa Farhang
Pakistan	Islamabad	Reza Amiri-Moghaddam
Panama	Panama City	Vacant
Paraguay	Asunción	Vacant
Peru	Lima	Vacant
Philippines	Manila	Yousef Esmaeilzadeh
Poland	Warsaw	Isa Kameli
Portugal	Lisbon	Seyed Majid Tafreshi
Qatar	Doha	Ali Salehabadi
Republic of the Congo	Brazzaville	Vacant
Romania	Bucharest	Seyed Hossein Sadat Meidani
Russia	Moscow	Kazem Jalali
São Tomé and Príncipe	São Tomé	Vacant
Saudi Arabia	Riyadh	Alireza Enayati
Senegal	Dakar	Hassan Asgari
Seychelles	Victoria	Hassan Ali-Bakhshi Dual accreditation
Serbia	Belgrade	Mohammad-Sadegh Fazli
Sierra Leone	Freetown	Seyed Khalil Sadati-Amiri
Singapore	Singapore	Behnam Bolourian
Slovakia	Bratislava	Asadollah Eshragh Jahromi Dual accreditation
Slovenia	Ljubljana	Marzieh Afkham
South Africa	Pretoria	Mansour Shakib-Mehr
South Korea	Seoul	Saeed Kouzehchi
Suriname	Paramaribo	Hojjatollah Soltani Dual accreditation
Spain	Madrid	Reza Zabib
Sri Lanka	Colombo	Alireza Delkhosh
State of Palestine	Ramallah	Vacant
Sudan	Khartoum	Hassan Shah Hosseini
Sweden	Stockholm	Hojjatollah Faghani
Switzerland	Bern	Mahmoud Barimani
Syria	Damascus	Hossein Akbari
Tajikistan	Dushanbe	Alireza Haghighian
Tanzania	Dodoma	Hossein Alvandi
Thailand	Bangkok	Nassereddin Heydari
Timor-Leste	Dili	Mohammad Boroujerdi Dual accreditation
Tunisia	Tunis	Mir-Masoud Hosseinian
Turkey	Ankara	Mohammad Hassan Habibollahzadeh
Turkmenistan	Ashgabat	Ali Mojtaba Rouzbehani
Uganda	Kampala	Majid Saffar
Ukraine	Kyiv	Manouchehr Moradi
United Arab Emirates	Abu Dhabi	Reza Ameri
United Kingdom	London	Seyed Ali Mousavi
United States	Washington, D.C.	Vacant
United Nations	New York City	Saeed Iravani
Uruguay	Montevideo	Mojtaba Bani-Asad
Uzbekistan	Tashkent	Mohammad Ali Eskandari
Vatican City	Vatican City	Mohammad Hossein Mokhtari
Venezuela	Caracas	Ali Chegini
Vietnam	Hanoi	Ali Akbar Nazari
Yemen	Sana'a	Ali Mohammad Rezaei
Zambia	Lusaka	Vacant
Zimbabwe	Harare	Abbas Navazani
