= Reza Sadr =

Iranian politician

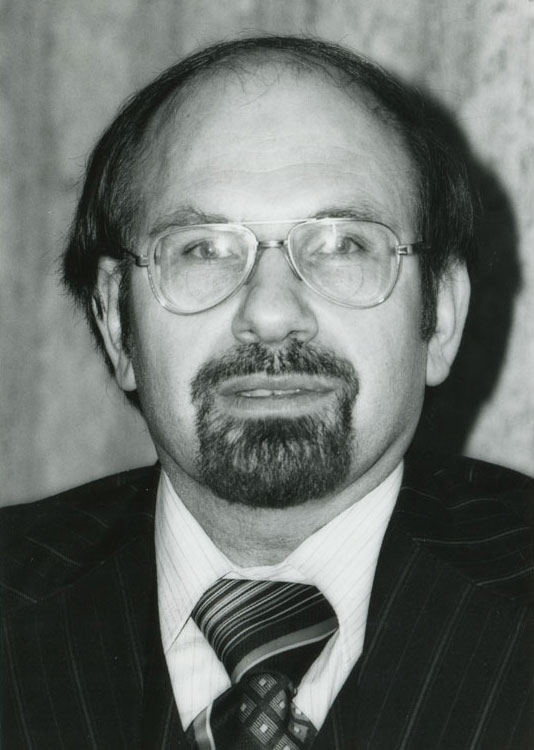

Minister of Commerce
- In office 18 February 1979 – 20 July 1980
- Prime Minister: Mehdi Bazargan

Personal details
- Born: 1932 (age 93–94) Qom, Iran
- Party: Freedom Movement of Iran

Reza Sadr (Persian: رضا صدر) is an Iranian politician who served in the interim government of Bazargan and the cabinet of Revolutionary Council as the minister of commerce.

He came from a family with a clerical background and studied chemistry, as well as business administration. Sadr was editor-in-chief of Mizan newspaper, the official organ of the Freedom Movement of Iran.

Media offices
New title Newspaper founded	Managing director of Mizan; 1980–1981	Vacant Newspaper banned
Government offices
Preceded by Abbasgholi Bakhtiar as Acting Minister	Minister of Commerce; 1979–1981	Succeeded by Hossein Kazempour Ardebili
