= Abuzar Ebrahimi Torkaman =

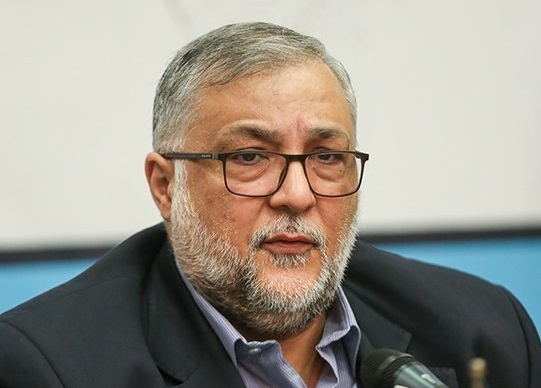

Ambassador of Iran to Bosnia and Herzegovina
- Incumbent
- Assumed office October 2023
- President: Ebrahim Raisi
- Preceded by: Gholamreza Ghelichkhan

Personal details
- Born: Abuzar Ebrahimi Torkaman; 1968 (age 57–58) Tehran
- Occupation: Head of "Islamic Culture and Communication Organization" (2013–2021)

Abuzar Ebrahimi Torkaman (Persian: ابوذر ابراهیمی ترکمان) (born: in Tehran), is the current Iranian ambassador to Bosnia and Herzegovina since October 2023.

He was the head of "Islamic Culture and Relations Organization" from 2013 to 2021. He has a doctorate-degree in private law as well as having seminary education. Ebrahimi possesses the following positions in his executive record:

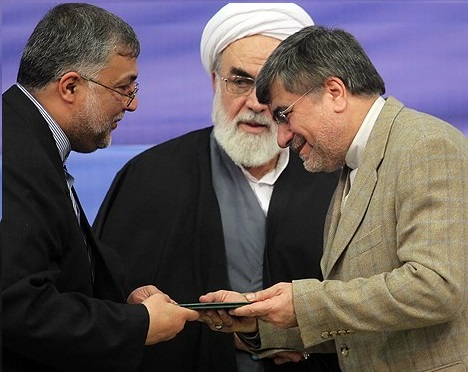
Introduction of Abuzar Ebrahimi Torkaman (as the Head of "Islamic Culture/Communication Organization");; beside the head of the Office of the Supreme Leader of Iran (presently Ali Khamenei), and Ali-Jannati

The cultural attaché of the Embassy of the Islamic Republic of Iran in Ankara (Turkey), the cultural attaché of the Embassy of the Islamic Republic of Iran in Ashgabat (Turkmenistan), a member of the "Editorial-Board of the Journal" in the field of "International-Culture".

Ebrahimi's other record positions are as follows: deputy of general directorate of "Asia-Pacific Culture" in the "Organization of Islamic Culture and Communication"; general manager of Asia-Pacific Culture in the "Organization of Islamic Culture and Communication"; cultural adviser of the Islamic Republic of Iran in the Russian Federation since March 10, 2008, and so on.

Abuzar Ebrahimi's scientific/religious works include:

- Quranic-Latifehha,
- Scholars in Russian story,
- Russian culture through customs
- Three cities (about the Islamic cities and celebrities of Greater Khorasan (story)),

and more than one hundred scientific articles in Persian, English, Russian, Turkmen and Istanbul Turkish languages which have been published in the press inside/outside Iran.

== See also ==
- Mohammad-Ali Taskhiri; a former head of "Islamic culture and relations organization"
