= Morteza Sarmadi =

Iranian politician and diplomat (born 1954)

- مرتضی سرمدی
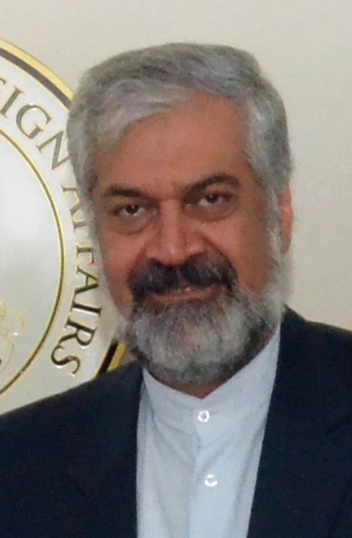
- Sarmadi in 2019

Vice Minister of Foreign Affairs
- In office 2013–2019
- President: Hassan Rouhani

Ambassador of Iran to United Kingdom
- In office 2000–2004
- President: Mohammad Khatami
- Preceded by: Gholamreza Ansari
- Succeeded by: Mohammad Hossein Adeli

Spokesperson for the Ministry of Foreign Affairs
- In office 1982–1997
- President: Ali Khamenei Akbar Hashemi Rafsanjani
- Preceded by: Reza Alavi Tabataba'i
- Succeeded by: Mahmoud Mohammadi

Personal details
- Born: 1954 (age 71–72) Tehran, Iran

Morteza Sarmadi (Persian: مرتضی سرمدی) was an Iranian diplomat and former Vice Minister of Foreign Affairs in Iran's Ministry of Foreign Affairs, from 2013 until his retirement in 2019. He also served as an Iranian Ambassador to the UK from 2000 to 2004 and Spokesperson for the Ministry of Foreign Affairs from 1982 to 1997.

Diplomatic posts
Preceded by Reza Alavi Tabataba'i	Spokesperson for the Ministry of Foreign Affairs of Iran; 1982–1997	Succeeded by Mahmoud Mohammadi
