= Hossein Kazempour Ardebili =

Iranian politician (1952–2020)

Hossein Kazempour Ardabili

Ambassador of Iran to Japan
- In office 1991–1995
- Preceded by: Mohammad Hossein Adeli
- Succeeded by: Manouchehr Mottaki

Minister of Commerce
- In office 11 March 1981 – 17 August 1981
- President: Abolhassan Banisadr
- Preceded by: Reza Sadr
- Succeeded by: Habibollah Asgaroladi

Personal details
- Born: 1952 Tehran, Iran
- Died: 16 May 2020 (aged 67–68) Tehran, Iran
- Education: Allameh Tabataba'i University (BBA); Oklahoma State University (MBA)

Hossein Kazempour Ardebili (Persian: حسین کاظم‌پور اردبیلی, also spelled Hoseyn Kazempur-Ardabili or similar variations, 1952 – 16 May 2020) was an Iranian diplomat and politician, serving as Iran's representative to OPEC from 1995 to 2008 and again from 2013 to his death in 2020. Previously, he served as the nation's commerce minister, as well as deputy foreign minister and deputy oil minister at various times in the 1980s. He served as the Iranian ambassador to Japan from 1990 to 1994. He died in 2020 due to a brain haemorrhage caused by COVID-19. Bloomberg News called Ardebili the "ultimate OPEC negotiator" who "defended Iran's oil interests through war and sanctions".

== Biography ==
Hossein Kazempour Ardebili was born in Tehran in 1952. He earned a bachelor's degree in business administration from what is now the Allameh Tabataba'i University in 1974 and an MBA from the Oklahoma State University before the start of the Iranian Revolution.

== Career ==
To cover his expenses during his studies in the U.S. he worked as a pizza delivery man. He was Iran's Commerce Minister in 1981 under Prime Minister Mohammad-Ali Rajai, when he was wounded in a bomb attack against the Islamic Republican Party headquarters. He related that the attack initially left him unable to walk and caused hearing loss. He had to go to Switzerland for treatment. During the international isolation against Iran in the early phase of Iran–Iraq War (1980–1988), he unsuccessfully lobbied Western governments to sell weapons to Iran. According to him, he had to sell Iranian oil to India at a low price of $10/barrel. At various times during the 1980s, he served as deputy foreign minister and deputy oil minister under Prime Minister Mir-Hossein Mousavi.

He served as the Iranian ambassador to Japan between March 1990 and December 1994. A Japanese police investigation in 2000 accused him of having been involved in exports of parts of antitank rocket launchers to Iran, violating Japanese restrictions against exports of weapons to Iran since 1967. According to the accusation, Kazempour and another employee of the embassy signed checks for Sun Beam, the Japanese company making the delivery. The former leaders of the (now-bankrupt) company pleaded guilty in March 2000, while the Iranian embassy at the time denied involvement and said that the sale was unauthorised. Kazempour was not charged because of diplomatic immunity, and afterwards refused to comment on the subject.

After returning from Japan he initially became an adviser to the foreign minister, and was subsequently appointed Iran's representative to Organization of the Petroleum Exporting Countries (OPEC) between 1995 and 2008, serving under presidents of various political sides including Mohammad Khatami and Mahmoud Ahmadinejad. Between 1996 and 1999 he was chairman of OPEC's Board of Governors. In the late 1990s he arranged a deal with Saudi Arabia to reduce oil production after a price war. In 2000 Iran nominated him as OPEC's secretary general, but he was defeated by Venezuela's Alí Rodríguez Araque. By 2005 he was a board member of the National Iranian Oil Company (NIOC) and Chairman of its Swiss-based subsidiary NICO.

He served again as his country's top representative to OPEC from 2013 to his death in 2020. He was an advisor to the Oil Minister Bijan Namdar Zangeneh, and at multiple occasions attended OPEC meetings on the minister's behalf. He helped improve the Islamic Republic's negotiating position in OPEC and played a role in the recovery of its oil industry during the lifting of sanctions following the nuclear deal in 2015. When the U.S. president Donald Trump pulled out from the multinational deal and reimposed sanctions, he taunted Trump that his tweets helped Iran by increasing oil prices.

== Death ==
On 5 March 2020, amid the coronavirus pandemic, he missed an OPEC extraordinary meeting that resulted in a price war between Saudi Arabia and Russia. He stayed home because his preexisting heart problems put him at a higher health risk if he were to travel. He was hospitalized in Tehran in early May due to a brain haemorrhage, and fell into coma. He died on 16 May at the hospital. His funeral was held on May 17 in Tehran, and the ceremony was attended by both Oil Minister Zangeneh and Foreign Minister Mohammad Javad Zarif. A few days later, OPEC headquarters held a special condolence ceremony over his death, attended by the Secretary General Mohammed Barkindo.

== Evaluation ==
According to Bloomberg News, he was an "ultimate OPEC negotiator" who "defended Iran's oil interests through war and sanctions." The news agency's report on his death describes him as "a constant" in the world's oil diplomacy, and was a "stubborn negotiator" in OPEC's meetings, especially during clashes with Iran's rival Saudi Arabia. In 2008, Kazempour told the Hamshahri newspaper that, "If Iran has had success in the international energy sector, I have been one of the main agents of this success." Arne Walther, former secretary general of the International Energy Forum describes him as having a "poker face" and having mastered "the art of bureaucratic mischief". Iran's foreign minister Mohammad Javad Zarif described him as a "strong defender of national interests ... and candid advisor to the Islamic Republic's officials".
