= List of ambassadors of Iran to Jordan =

Coordinates: 31.954757°N 35.903830°E

Ambassador of Iran to Jordan
- Coat of Arms of Iran
- Incumbent; Ali Asghar Naseri; Chargé d'affaires
- Inaugural holder: Zain al Abedin Khaksar
- Formation: March 15, 1951

The Iranian ambassador in Amman is the official representative of the Government in Tehran to the Government of Jordan.

== List of representatives ==
| Diplomatic accreditation | Diplomatic accreditation Solar Hijri calendar | Ambassador | Persian language | Observations | List of presidents of Iran | List of kings of Jordan | Term end | Term end Solar Hijri calendar |
|---|---|---|---|---|---|---|---|---|
| March 15, 1951 | 1329 | Zain al Abedin Khaksar | | M. Zain al Abedin Khaksar established the Iranian Embassy in Hashemi, Jordan. Appointed March 15, 1951 | Mohammad Reza Pahlavi | Talal of Jordan | | |
| 1956 | 1334 | Zain al Abedin Khaksar | Persian: زین‌العابدین خاکسار | | Mohammad Reza Pahlavi | Hussein of Jordan | | |
| 1963 | 1341 | Kazem Niamir | Persian: کاظم نیامیر | (* 1913 in Zanjan, Iran); P. Diplomat; E. Graduate of Political Council, Head of the 3rd Political Department (1959–63); Ambassador to Jordan (1963–65); 1973: Imperial Embassy of Iran Jima Road — Old Airport Area Addis Ababa, Ethiopia | Mohammad Reza Pahlavi | Hussein of Jordan | 1965 | |
| 1968 | 1346 | Mansour Qadar | Persian: تیپ منصور قدر | ( * 1923, Qadar, Iran) Military Intelligence Officer; Ambassador to Jordan, 1967-1973; Ambassador to Lebanon, 1973-1979. Beginning service in the military; recollections of General Qarane'i; recollections of ambassadorship to Jordan and King Hussein's drive against the Palestinians in 1970 | Mohammad Reza Pahlavi | Hussein of Jordan | | 1352 |
| 1974 | 1352 | Fereydoun Moustaghi | Persian: فریدون موثقی | Fereidun Mowassaqi, From 1968 to 1970 he was Iranian ambassador to Turkey. | Mohammad Reza Pahlavi | Hussein of Jordan | April 1, 1977 | |
| 1977 | 1355 | | | Fereydoun Movassaghi | Mohammad Reza Pahlavi | Hussein of Jordan | | |
| April 1, 1977 | 1355 | Mohammad Noorzarf | Persian: محمد نورشرف | Chargé d'affaires | Mohammad Reza Pahlavi | Hussein of Jordan | | 1357 |
| 1979 | 1357 | Ali Reza Bayat | Persian: علیرضا بیات | In 1964 he was first secretary in Paris. From 1974 to 1978 he was consul general at Munich | Mohammad Reza Pahlavi | Hussein of Jordan | | 1357 |
| 1979 | 1357 | Hamza Akhavan | Persian: ه اخوان (سفیر) | Hamzeh Akhavan-Nagavi | Mohammad Reza Pahlavi | Hussein of Jordan | | |
| January 1, 1981 | 1359 | | | Jordan (Diplomatic relations broken Feb 1981) Head of Interest Section. | Abolhassan Banisadr | Hussein of Jordan | | |
| January 1, 1981 | 1359 | Hassan Tabariyan | Persian: حسن تبرائیان | Head of the Office for the Protection of Interests Mohammad Ali Tabatabae Hesan | Abolhassan Banisadr | Hussein of Jordan | | |
| 1982 | 1360 | Laurainejad | Persian: لورائی نژاد | Head of the Office for the Protection of Interests | Ali Khamenei | Hussein of Jordan | | 1363 |
| 1988 | 1366 | Bijan Namdar Zangeneh | Persian: باقر زنگنه | Head of the Office for the Protection of Interests | Ali Khamenei | Hussein of Jordan | | |
| January 1991 | 1369 | Hosein Qolam Reza Naraqian | | Chargé d'affaires | Akbar Hashemi Rafsanjani | Hussein of Jordan | May 1991 | |
| October 26, 1993 | 1371 | Ahmad Dastamalchian | Persian: احمد دستمالچیان | | Akbar Hashemi Rafsanjani | Hussein of Jordan | | |
| 1997 | 1375 | Mohammad Ali Sobhani | Persian: محمدعلی سبحانی | | Mohammad Khatami | Hussein of Jordan | 1999 | |
| 1999 | 1377 | Nosratollah Tajik | Persian: نصرت‌الله تاجیک | | Mohammad Khatami | Abdullah II of Jordan | 2003 | |
| October 1, 2005 | 1383 | Mohammad Irani | Persian: محمد ایرانی | Muhammad Irani | Mahmoud Ahmadinejad | Abdullah II of Jordan | 2007 | |
| March 1, 2009 | 1387 | Mostafa Mosleh-Zadeh | Persian: مصطفی مصلح‌زاده | former Iranian Ambassador to Jordania Mosalhzadeh | Mahmoud Ahmadinejad | Abdullah II of Jordan | November 28, 2012 | |
| November 28, 2012 | 1390 | Ahmad Hosseini | | Chargé d'affaires in 2019 he is charge in Beiruth. | Mahmoud Ahmadinejad | Abdullah II of Jordan | | |
| June 22, 2014 | 1392 | Mojtaba Ferdosipour | Persian: مجتبی فردوسی‌پور | | Hassan Rouhani | Abdullah II of Jordan | February 21, 2019 | 1397 |
| 2019 | 1398 | Karang Ghaffari | Persian: کارنگ غفاری | Chargé d'affaires | Hassan Rouhani | Abdullah II of Jordan | 2021 | 1400 |
| 2021 | 1400 | Ali Asghar Naseri | Persian: علی اصغر ناصری | Chargé d'affaires | Ebrahim Raisi | Abdullah II of Jordan | | |

== See also ==
- Iran–Jordan relations
