= Mohammad Ali Hosseini =

Iranian politician and diplomat (born 1969)

Mohammad-Ali Hosseini سید محمد علی حسینی
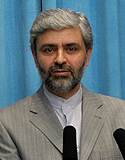

Ambassador of Iran to the Pakistan
- In office 09 January 2020 – 7 June 2023
- President: Hassan Rouhani Ebrahim Raisi
- Preceded by: Mehdi Honardoost
- Succeeded by: Reza Amiri-Moghaddam

Ambassador of Iran to Italy
- In office 2009–2013
- President: Mahmoud Ahmadinejad
- Preceded by: Fereydon Haghbin
- Succeeded by: Jahanbakhsh Mozaffari

Spokesperson for the Ministry of Foreign Affairs of Iran
- In office 10 September 2006 – 21 July 2008
- President: Mahmoud Ahmadinejad
- Preceded by: Hamid-Reza Assefi
- Succeeded by: Hassan Ghashghavi

Personal details
- Born: 16 September 1969 (age 56)

Mohammad-Ali Hosseini (Persian: محمد علی حسینی) is an Iranian diplomat and politician who was formerly the deputy Minister of Foreign Affairs of Iran. He was the Assistant to Minister for Foreign Affairs from 2017 until December 2019 and also vice minister of parliamentary affairs. he was formerly Ambassador of Islamic Republic of Iran to Pakistan.

Seyed Mohammad Ali Hosseini in an exclusive interview with IRNA in Islamabad said Foreign Minister Shah Mahmood Qureshi’s visit is considered very important at this critical time because Iran and Pakistan as two main neighbors of Afghanistan have been exposed to the consequences of the 20-year occupation of the country by the United States and its Western allies.

With his efforts Pakistan and Iran Inaugurated the third border crossing point at Pishin Mand region in balochistan, The two countries inaugurated the Rimadan-Gabd border gateway in December last year, whereas the Taftan border has been operational for decades.

Diplomatic posts
Preceded by Hamid-Reza Assefi	Spokesperson for the Ministry of Foreign Affairs of Iran; 2006–2008	Succeeded by Hassan Ghashghavi
