= List of ambassadors of Iran to Japan =

Coordinates: 35.648072°N 139.731249°E

Ambassador of Iran to Japan
- Coat of Arms of Iran
- Incumbent; Peyman Saadat since March 2023
- Inaugural holder: Hovhannes Masehyan
- Formation: July 1, 1930

The Iranian ambassador in Tokyo is the official representative of the Government in Tehran to the Government of Japan.

Till August 16, 1971 the Iranian Ambassador to Japan was accredited in Taipei.

== List of representatives ==
Diplomatic accreditation	Diplomatic accreditation Solar Hijri calendar	Ambassador	Persian language	Observations	List of heads of state of Iran	List of prime ministers of Japan	Term end	Term end Solar Hijri calendar
July 1, 1930	1308	Hovhannes Masehyan			Reza Shah Pahlavi	Hamaguchi Osachi	August 1, 1931	1309
September 1, 1931	1309	Hovhannes Masehyan	Persian: هوهانس ماسحیان Armenian: Հովհաննես Մասեհյան		Reza Shah Pahlavi	Wakatsuki Reijirō	October 1, 1933	1310
October 1, 1933	1310	Hassan-Ali Kamal Hedayat (fa)	Persian: حسنعلی کمال هدایت		Reza Shah Pahlavi	Saitō Makoto	October 1, 1933	1312
July 2, 1934	1312	Bagher Azimi (fa)	Persian: باقر عظیمی		Reza Shah Pahlavi	Okada Keisuke	May 1, 1937	1316
May 1, 1937	1316	Ali-Mohammad Saybani	Persian: علی‌محمد شیبانی		Reza Shah Pahlavi	Hayashi Senjūrō	November 1, 1938	1317
1939	1317	Mahmoud Bahadori	Persian: محمود بهادری	From 1316 to 1319, Iran did not have a minister in Japan. On December 25, 1318, the National Salvation Council approved a friendly treaty between the governments of Iran and Japan. Japan was Hitler's German ally.	Reza Shah Pahlavi	Hiranuma Kiichirō	1941	1319
March 1, 1941	1319	Abolqasem Najm	Persian: ابوالقاسم نجم	25 August to 17 September 1941 Anglo-Soviet invasion of Iran	Reza Shah Pahlavi	Yonai Mitsumasa	May 1, 1943	1321
January 28, 1945	1323			On January 28, 1945 occupied Iran declared war on Japan under pressure from Britain and Russia. Ali Soheili ordered the interruption of his diplomatic relation with the Japanese government and summoned Abolqasem Najm to Tehran. This breakup continued until March 1, 1955.	Mohammad Reza Shah Pahlavi	Shidehara Kijūrō	1954	1332
March 1, 1955	1333	Musa Nuri Esfandiari	Persian: موسی نوری اسفندیاری		Mohammad Reza Shah Pahlavi	Hatoyama Ichirō	April 1, 1955	1335
1957	1335	Hossein Ghods-Nakhai	Persian: حسین قدس نخعی		Mohammad Reza Shah Pahlavi	Kishi Nobusuke	1958	1336
1958	1336	Abbas Aram	Persian: عباس آرام		Mohammad Reza Shah Pahlavi	Kishi Nobusuke	1960	1338
1960	1338	Javad Sadr	Persian: جواد صدر		Mohammad Reza Shah Pahlavi	Ikeda Hayato	1964	1342
1964	1342	Hormoz Qarib (fa)	Persian: هرمز قریب		Mohammad Reza Shah Pahlavi	Satō Eisaku	1969	1347
1969	1347	Fazlollah Nureddin Kia	Persian: فضل‌الله نورالدین کیا		Mohammad Reza Shah Pahlavi	Satō Eisaku	1973	1351
July 1, 1976	1354	Abdol-Hossein Hamzavi	Persian: عبدالحسین حمزاوی		Mohammad Reza Shah Pahlavi	Fukuda Takeo	July 1, 1979	
1978	1356	Naser Majd Ardakani	Persian: ناصر مجد اردکانی		Mohammad Reza Shah Pahlavi	Ōhira Masayoshi	1980	1358
1980	1358	Qasem Salehkhu	Persian: قاسم صالح‌خو		Abolhassan Banisadr	Suzuki Zenkō	1981	
1983	1361	Abdorrahim Govahi (ja)	Persian: عبدالرحیم گواهی		Ali Khamenei	Nakasone Yasuhiro		1365
1987	1365	Mohammad Hossein Adeli	Persian: محمدحسین عادلی		Ali Khamenei	Nakasone Yasuhiro	1989	
1991	1369	Hossein Kazempour Ardabili	Persian: حسین کاظم‌پور اردبیلی		Akbar Hashemi Rafsanjani	Miyazawa Kiichi		1373
1995	1373	Manouchehr Mottaki	Persian: منوچهر متکی		Akbar Hashemi Rafsanjani	Murayama Tomiichi	November 1, 2000	
2000	1378	Ali Majedi (fa)	Persian: علی ماجدی		Mohammad Khatami	Mori Yoshirō	September 1, 2004	
November 1, 2004	1382	Mohsen Talaei	Persian: محسن طلایی		Mohammad Khatami	Koizumi Jun’ichirō	January 1, 2007	
March 11, 2008	1385	Abbas Araghchi	Persian: سید عباس عراقچی		Mahmoud Ahmadinejad	Asō Tarō	October 1, 2011	
October 1, 2011	1389	Majid Mojtahed Shabestari	Persian: مجید مجتهد شبستری	Chargé d'affaires is a brother of Mohammad Mojtahed-Shabestari (1936–) Hojjat al-Islam. The third brother, Ali Ashraf Mojtahed-Shabestari, served as ambassador to Tajikistan, ambassador and assistant to the Permanent Representative Office of Iran at the Geneva office of the United Nations, head of the Foreign Ministry's Finance	Mahmoud Ahmadinejad	Noda Yoshihiko	September 1, 2012	
August 28, 2012	1397	Reza Nazar-Ahari	Persian: رضا نظرآهاری		Mahmoud Ahmadinejad	Noda Yoshihiko	April 1, 1997	
September 11, 2018	1397	Morteza Rahmani-Movahed (ja)	Persian: مرتضی رحمانی موحد		Hassan Rouhani	Shinzō Abe	2022	1400
2022	1400	Mohammad Reza Loghmani	Persian: محمد رضا لقمانی	Chargé d'Affaires	Ebrahim Raisi	Fumio Kishida	2023	1401
March 2023	1401	Peyman Saadat	Persian: پیمان سعادت		Ebrahim Raisi	Fumio Kishida		

== See also ==
- Iran–Japan relations
