= List of permanent representatives of Iran to the United Nations Office at Geneva =

Coordinates: 46.222807°N 6.132608°E

Permanent Representative of Iran next the United Nations Office at Geneva
- Persian: نماینده دائم جمهوری اسلامی ایران در دفتر سازمان ملل متحد در ژنو
- Coat of Arms of Iran
- Incumbent; Ali Bahreyni since September 28, 2022
- Inaugural holder: Mirza Riza Khan
- Formation: 1926

The Iranian Permanent Representative in Geneva is the official representative of the Government in Tehran next the United Nations Office at Geneva.

== List of representatives ==
Diplomatic accreditation	Diplomatic accreditation Solar Hijri calendar	Permanent Representative	Persian language	Observations	List of presidents of Iran	Term end	Term end Solar Hijri calendar
1926	1304	Mirza Riza Khan	Mirza Reza Khan (Arfa ed-Dowleh), the Persian representative at the League of Nations, Arfa ed-Dowleh, he was the father of Hasan Arfa.	پرنس ارفع	Reza Shah	1926	1304
March 1, 1933	1311	Ali-Akbar Davar	In March 1933 he headed the Iranian delegation to the League of Nations in Geneva.	علی‌اکبر داور	Reza Shah		1311
1933	1311	Nasrollah Entezam	Persian Representative at the League of Nations in Geneva	نصرالله انتظام‌سلطنه	Reza Shah		1311
1954	1332	Javad Mansur	(*1926) Minister of Information. Javad Mansur was a brother of Hassan Ali Mansur.	علی منصور	Mohammad Reza Pahlavi	1956	1334
1956	1334	Fazlollah Zahedi	(* 1892 † 2.9.1963) Lieutenant General, He was named Iran's permanent representative to the United Nations European headquarters in Geneva in 1960.	الله زاهدی	Mohammad Reza Pahlavi	September 2, 1963	1341
1963	1341	Sadegh Azimi	AZIMI, Sadegh, b. 15 Jan. 1915, Teheran, Iran. Diplomat. Educ. Dip, in Civil Engring., Special Schl. of Pub. Works, Paris, 1935: Town Planning study, Univ. of Paris, 1935–36, BS (Pol. Sci.), Univ. of Geneva, 1957; PhD, Grad. inst of Int. Studies, Plenipotentiary, Iranian Permanent Mission to UN Off, Geneva, 1963–72; Ambassador, ibid., & Iranian Govt. Deleg. to ILO, 1972- Publs. Road construction, 1973, Iran During world War II & the Azerbaijan Crisis. Hons. Order of Homayoun, 4th,	صادق عظیمی	Mohammad Reza Pahlavi	1972	1350
1969	1347	Rahmat Atabaki	ATABAKI, Rahmat: P. P. Iranian Ambassador to European UN Bureau, Geneva; B. 1904, Tehran; From 1963 to 1967 he was Iranian ambassador to Austria.	رحمت اتابکی	Mohammad Reza Pahlavi	1971	1349
1970	1348	Mohammad Ali Masoud Ansari		محمدعلی مسعود انصاری	Mohammad Reza Pahlavi		1350
1972	1350	Khosrow Hedayat Azar	Khosrow Hedayat (*1905 in Tehran 1974 in Geneva) In the fifteenth parliament, the representative of Tehran was appointed to the cabinet of Zahedi, Deputy Prime Minister. For some time, he served in the positions of chairman of the board of directors of the National Oil Company and the head of the Supreme Board of Inspection of the National Oil Company. Khosrow Hedayat served as Ambassador to the Iranian embassies in Brussels and the Vatican. He also served as Iran's ambassador to the European United Nations Office.He is the brother of the commanding officer Abdullah Hedayat.	خسرو هدایت	Mohammad Reza Pahlavi	1974	1352
1974	1352	Manuchehr Fartash		منوچهر فرتاش	Mohammad Reza Pahlavi	1979	1357
1979	1357	Jafar Nadim		جعفر ندیم	Mohammad Reza Pahlavi	1979	Esfand 1357
1980	1358	Kazem Rajavi	24.04.1990	کاظم رجوی	Abolhassan Banisadr	1981	1359
1980	1358	Mostafa Dabiri	Chargé d'affaires	مصطفی دبیری	Abolhassan Banisadr	1982	1360
1983	1361	Nasrollah Kazemi Kamyab		نصرالله کاظمی کامیاب	Ali Khamenei	1987	1365
1987	1365	Cyrus Nasseri	Siroos Nasseri	سیروس ناصری	Ali Khamenei	1998	1376
1998	1376	Ali Khorram	From 1982 to 1986 he was Iranian ambassador to China. List of ambassadors of Iran to China	سید علی خرم	Mohammad Khatami	2003	1381
2003	1381	Mohammad Reza Alborzi		محمدرضا البرزی	Mohammad Khatami	October 31, 2005	1384
February 1, 2005	1384	Ali Reza Moaiyeri	Alireza Ma'ari (*1957 in Rasht, Iran From 1982 to 1988 he was Deputy Prime Minister of Iran in political affairs in the Prime Minister Mir Hossein Mousavi's Cabinet (1360–1366)	علیرضا معیری	Mahmoud Ahmadinejad	2009	1388
March 22, 2010	1388	Mohammad Reza Sajjadi		سید محمدرضا سجادی	Mahmoud Ahmadinejad	2013	1392
May 1, 2013	1392	Mohsen Naziri Asl		محسن نذیری اصل	Hassan Rouhani	2018	1397
August 14, 2018	1397	Esmail Baghaei		اسماعیل بقایی	Hassan Rouhani	2022	1401
September 28, 2022	1401	Ali Bahreyni		علی بحرینی	Ebrahim Raisi		
