= Mohammad Hossein Adeli =

Iranian politician, diplomat, economist and academic

Seyyed Mohammad Hossein Adeli
- محمدحسین عادلی
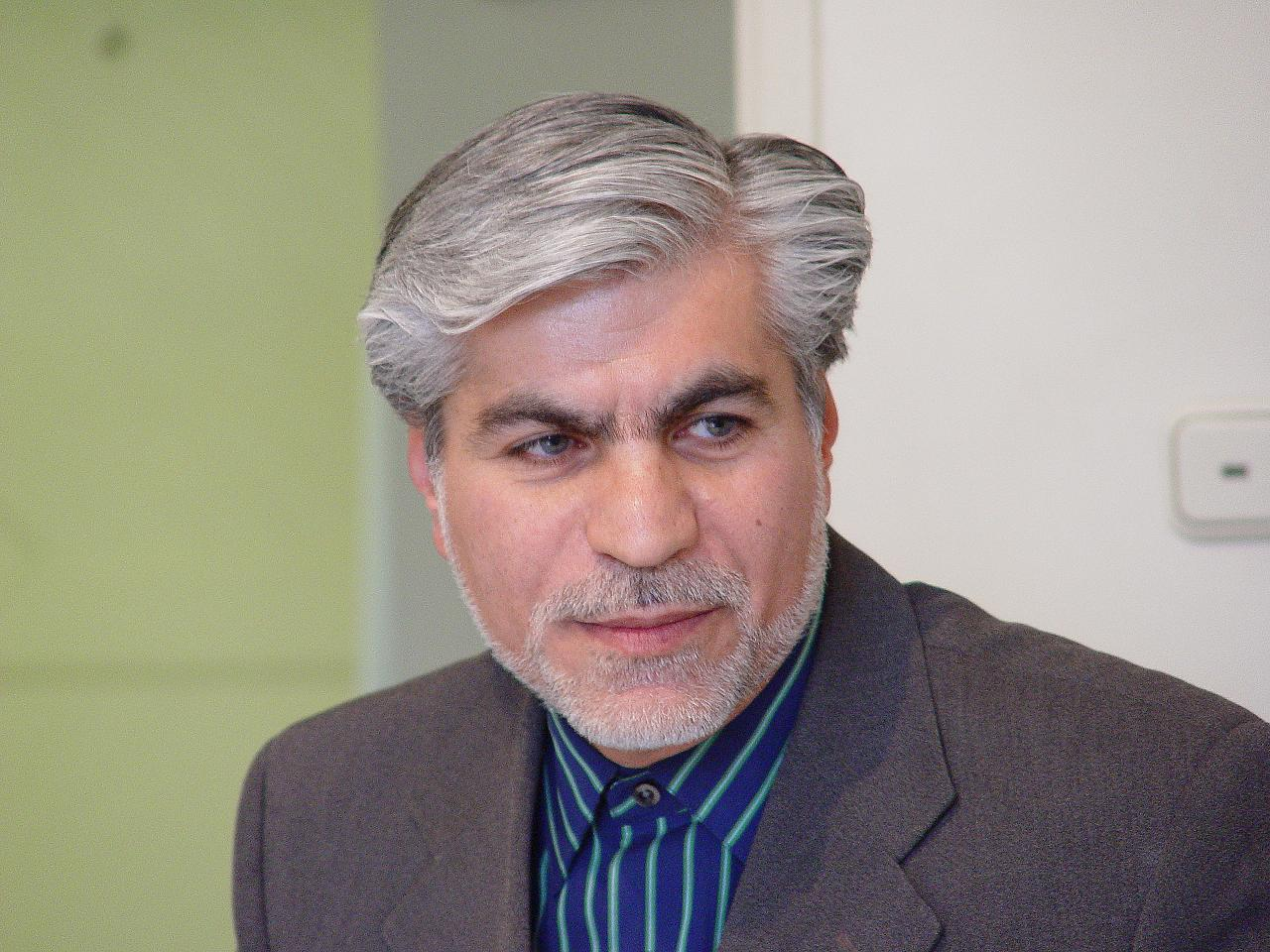

Secretary-General of Gas Exporting Countries Forum
- In office 1 January 2014 – 12 January 2018
- Preceded by: Leonid Bokhanovsky
- Succeeded by: Yury Sentyurin

Ambassador of Iran to the United Kingdom
- In office 2004–2005
- President: Mohammad Khatami
- Preceded by: Morteza Sarmadi
- Succeeded by: Rasoul Movahedian

Ambassador of Iran to Canada
- In office 1995–1999
- President: Akbar Hashemi Rafsanjani Mohammad Khatami
- Preceded by: Hamid Moulayi
- Succeeded by: Ali Ahmadi

Ambassador of Iran to Japan
- In office 1987–1989
- President: Akbar Hashemi Rafsanjani
- Preceded by: Abdolrahim Gavahi
- Succeeded by: Hossein Kazempour Ardabili

Governor of the Central Bank of Iran
- In office 1989–1994
- Appointed by: Akbar Hashemi Rafsanjani
- Preceded by: Majid Ghassemi
- Succeeded by: Mohsen Nourbakhsh

Personal details
- Born: 16 February 1953 (age 73) Ahvaz, Iran
- Party: Executives of Construction Party
- Education: University of Tehran; Jamia Millia Islamia; California Coast University

Mohammad Hossein Adeli (Persian: محمدحسین عادلی, born in 1953 in Ahvaz) is an Iranian politician, diplomat, economist and academic. He was the Secretary General of the Gas Exporting Countries Forum from 2014 until 2018. He is the founder of Ravand Institute. He was the chairman of Iran's first Investment Bank Amin Investment Bank until 2011. In May 2014, he received the Order of the Rising Sun from the Emperor of Japan, Akihito, the highest Order given to any Iranian National for his important role in the Iran–Japan relations.

== Personal life and education ==
Hossein Adeli is one of the few Iranian politicians to have an international background, having studied Business Administration at Tehran Business School, he continued his Masters in International Economics at University of Tehran before earning his Doctor of Business Administration in California Coast University. He attended his Ph.D. courses in Stony Brook University and New School University. He obtained his second Ph.D. in Economics from Jamia Millia Islamia.

== Political and academic career ==
Adeli was educated in Dar ul-Funun (Persian: دار الفنون) in Tehran. Beginning his career teaching at various universities in Tehran, at age of 27 he became the Director General of the Economic Affairs Department in Iranian Ministry of Foreign Affairs. Five years later, he became special advisor to the Foreign Ministry. In the following year, he acted as advisor to the Minister of Petroleum. Adeli went on to represent Iran at various OPEC meetings. Adeli is one of the only dignitaries of the Islamic Republic to have actively participated to the World Economic Forum activities.

== Diplomatic career ==
Adeli's diplomatic career began with his appointment as Iran's Ambassador to Japan between 1986 and 1989, during which he played a key role in revitalising Iranian and Japanese business/political relations. While he was in office, Hirohito, the 124th Emperor of Japan who ruled for over 60 years died on January 7, 1989, and his imperial funeral was held on the next month. On February 24, Adeli and his wife attended the Rites of Imperial Funeral with Mostafa Mir-Salim, Vice President and Hossein Saffar Harandi, a Member of Parliament and the Chairman of Parliament Committee on Agriculture.

Soon thereafter, at the age of 36 he was appointed Governor of Central Bank of Iran. Adeli is credited a pioneer of the economic reform package during the critical years of reconstruction following the Iraq-Iran War.

Adeli's diplomatic career progressed through his appointment as Iranian Ambassador to Canada in 1995. At the end of his term in 1999, Adeli was nominated as Deputy Foreign Minister for Economic Affairs and the chairman of the Coordinating Council for Foreign Economic Relations until 2004. During these years, Adeli initiated two special committees for Reconstruction of Afghanistan and Reconstruction of Iraq through a series of multilateral arrangements, and filled the role of secretary general for both committees.

As his last official post, he served as Ambassador Extraordinary Plenipotentiary of Iran to the United Kingdom. At his time, he along with John Curtis and several others lobbied with Iranian Government to borrow 80 items for a new exhibition named "The Forgotten Empire".

== Career in Energy ==
Having served in the Ministry of Oil as international advisor. He has been the advocate and chief negotiator of many energy plans and projects, including the following:

- Iran-Pakistan-India pipeline; where he served as the co-chair of the joint commission of Iran, Pakistan and India.
- Iran-Armenia Gas pipeline; headed the gas diplomacy for this project
- Iran-EU energy cooperation; for which he negotiated for establishment of Iran-EU energy center in Iran, and headed the team to engage with Nabucco project to export gas to EU.
- Iran Gas cooperation with southern neighbors; where he led the talks with Kuwait and Saudi Arabia for development of Arash field in the Persian Gulf and the export of gas to KSA
- Iran-CIS gas and Oil cooperation; gas cooperation with Turkmenistan, Azerbaijan, and Kazakhstan.

== Awards and recognition ==
Adeli has also been active in regional and international groups and organisations, including the D-8, the G15, the Indian Ocean Rim Association for Regional Cooperation and the European Union. He has received many awards including a distinction by the Economic Cooperation Organization Secretary General for "Special Recognition and Appreciation" for his contribution and proposition of the name ECO. He also won the Crans-Montana Development and Peace Award in 2002 in Geneva.

Adeli has also received special recognition for various activities including: spearheading monetary reforms as Central Bank Governor; innovation of a new Islamic banking financial instrument called "Participation Paper", now widely used in Iran and other Islamic countries under the name of Sukuk; initiating the law for Official Development Assistance of Iran which aims to contribute to the development of least developing countries; initiating Economic Diplomacy for the first time in Iran; initiating Economic partnership with Africa through Iran–Africa economic summit; being head of Coordination for assistance to Iraqi reconstruction, and Coordination for assisting Afghanistan reconstruction through international organization. He has been a frequent guest speaker at many international conferences, including OPEC, South-South Cooperation, United Nations, World Economic Forum, Islamic Banking and Finance, World Bank, International Trade Centre and International Monetary Fund as well as major investment banks such as Goldman Sachs.

== Creation of Ravand Institute ==
After leaving the government, Adeli founded the Ravand Institute for Economic and International Studies, Iran’s first private non-governmental, non-partisan research centre (think-tank). He is the founder of Ravand Institute.

Diplomatic posts
| Preceded by Morteza Sarmadi | Iranian Ambassador to the United Kingdom; 2004–2005 | Succeeded by Rasoul Movahedian |
| Preceded by Hamid Molaei | Iranian Ambassador to Canada; 1995–1999 | Succeeded by Ali Ahmadi |
| Preceded by Abdolrahim Gavahi | Iranian Ambassador to Japan; 1987–1989 | Succeeded by Hossein Kazempour Ardabili |
Government offices
| Preceded by Majid Ghassemi | Governor of the Central Bank of Iran; 1989–1994 | Succeeded by Mohsen Nourbakhsh |
