= List of ambassadors of Iran to the United Kingdom =

Ambassador to the United Kingdom
- Emblem of Iran
- Incumbent; Seyed Ali Mousavi since June 12, 2025
- Style: His Excellency
- Residence: 16 Princes Gate; Knightsbridge; London
- Inaugural holder: Robert Shirley; Persian Ambassador
- Website: Iran Embassy in the UK

This is a list of Iranian ambassadors to the United Kingdom.

- 1608, Robert Shirley and Nakd Ali Beg
- 1809–1810, Mirza Abolhassan Khan Ilchi
- 1810, Set Khan Astvatsatourian
- 1839, Mirza Hossein Khan Moghaddam (Great Britain refused to receive him and rejected his mission)
- 1850–1855, Shafi' Khan (Chargé d'affaires)
- 1860–1861, Jafar Khan Moshir od-Dowleh
- 1862–1865, Mirza Mahmoud Khan Naser al-Molk (Minister Plenipotentiary) (ru)
- 1865–1867, Mirza Mohammad-Ali Khan (acting)
- 1867–1872, Mirza Mohsen Khan Moein ol-Molk (First as Chargé d'affaires then as Minister Resident and finally as Minister Plenipotentiary) (de)
- 1872–1889, Mirza Malkam Khan Nazem od-Dowleh (Minister Plenipotentiary)
- 1889–1906, Mohammad-Ali Khan Ala os-Saltaneh (Minister Plenipotentiary)
- 1907–1920, Mehdi Khan Ala os-Saltaneh (First as Chargé d'affaires then as Minister Resident and finally as Minister Plenipotentiary)
- 1921–1926, Davoud Khan Meftah os-Saltaneh (Minister Plenipotentiary) (fa)
- 1926–1927, Abdolali Khan Sadigh os-Saltaneh (Minister Plenipotentiary) (de)
- 1927–1929, Hovhannes Khan Masehian Moased os-Saltaneh (Minister Plenipotentiary)
- 1929–1930, Hassan Taqizadeh (Minister Plenipotentiary)
- 1931–1932, Ali-Qoli Masoud Ansari Moshaver ol-Mamalek (Minister Plenipotentiary) (ru)
- 1935–1937, Hossein Ala' (CMG) (Minister Plenipotentiary)
- 1938–1938, Ali Soheili (Minister Plenipotentiary)
- 1938–1940, Fazlollah Nabil (acting)
- 1940–1941, Mohammad-Ali Moghaddam (Minister Plenipotentiary) (fa)
- 1941–1947, Hassan Taqizadeh (First as Minister Plenipotentiary then as Ambassador)
- 1947–1950, Mohsen Rais
- 1950–1951, Ali Soheili
- 1951–1952, Mohammad Hadjeb Davallou (Chargé d'affaires a.i.)
- 1954–1954, Amir Khosrow Afshar (Chargé d'affaires a.i.)
- 1954–1958, Ali Soheili
- 1958–1961, Hossein Ghods-Nakhai
- 1961–1962, Mohsen Raïs
- 1962–1966, Ardeshir Zahedi
- 1967–1969, Abbas Aram
- 1969–1972, Amir Khosrow Afshar
- 1972–1975, Shuaauddin Ghotb
- 1976–1979, Parviz C. Radji
- 1979, Houshang Mahdavi (Abdolreza Mahdavi) (Chargé d'affaires) (fa)
- 1979–1980, Gholam-Ali Afrouz (Chargé d'affaires) (fa) (Ambassador during the 1980 Iranian Embassy Siege)
- 1980–1981, Seyfollah Ehdaei (Chargé d'affaires)
- 1981–1982, Alireza Farrokhrouz (Chargé d'affaires)
- 1982–1986, Jalal Sadatian (Chargé d'affaires) (fa)
- 1986–1989, Mohammad-Mehdi Akhondzadeh (Chargé d'affaires) (de)
- 1989–1990, Jamal Haj-Esmaili (Head of Iran's interest section in London)
- 1990–1992, Shamseddin Khareghani (Chargé d'affaires)
- 1992–1998, Gholamreza Ansari (Chargé d'affaires)(ru)
- 1998–1999, Mahmoud Mohammadi
- 1999–2000, Gholamreza Ansari
- 2000–2004, Morteza Sarmadi
- 2004–2005, Mohammad-Hossein Adeli
- 2006–2010, Rasoul Movahedian
- 2010–2012, Safar-Ali Eslamian Koupaei (Chargé d'affaires)
- 2013–2016, Mohammad-Hassan Habibollahzadeh (Chargé d'affaires)
- 2016–2021, Hamid Baeidinejad
- 2021, Mehdi Hosseini Matin (Chargé d'affaires)
- 2021–2022, Mohsen Baharvand
- 2022–2024, Mehdi Hosseini Matin (Chargé d'affaires)
- 2024–2025, Ali Matinfar (Chargé d'affaires)
- 2025–present, Seyed Ali Mousavi

== See also ==
- List of diplomats of the United Kingdom to Iran
