= Ravand Institute =

Iranian think tank

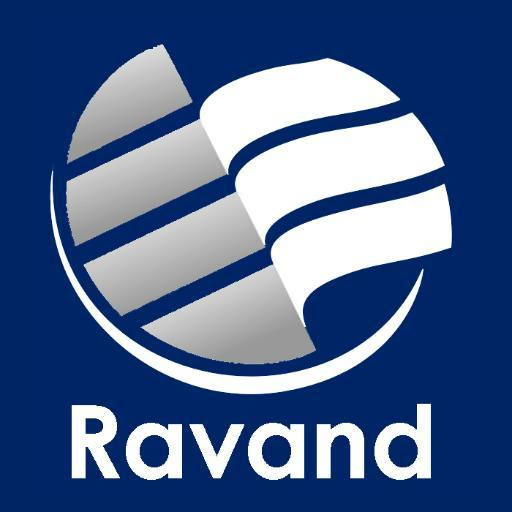
- Formation: 2005
- Type: Non-governmental organization
- Headquarters: Tehran, Iran
- Chairman: Mohammad-Hossein Adeli
- Website: RavandInstitute.com

The Ravand Institute for Economic and International Studies is the first Iranian think tank of its kind. It is an independent, private, non-partisan, non-governmental organization focusing on important policy issues facing Iran.

== Publications ==
The publications of this institute include policy papers and specialized reports, a Persian magazine called "Ravand-e Eghtesadi", Analytical periodical in English: Economic Trends, Monographs and books and Annual Conference Proceeding and Executive Summary.

== Ravand Conference ==
Dubbed by the media as the Davos of Iran, Ravand Conference is an international forum, held annually, where Iranian and international officials, corporate and business executives, international organizations, NGOs, the media, and academics are invited to participate and interact and to debate on a diversity of political and economic subjects with a view to contributing to the shaping of policies. The conference is also an opportune setting for networking and for meeting potential partners.

Notable people who attended Ravand conference are Mohammad Reza Bahonar, Iranian MP and Vice Speaker in Islamic Consultative Assembly; Adel Abdul Mahdi, Iraqi Vice President; Gholam Hossein Nozari, Managing Director, National Iranian Oil Company; Mohammadreza Nematzadeh, Deputy Minister of Oil and president of National Iranian Oil Company; Rosemary Hollis, Director of Research in Royal Institute of International Affairs, Chatham House; Ali Shamkhani, Centre for Strategic Defense Research; Mohammad Nahavandian, Head of National Globalization Center; and Vera de Ladoucette, Senior Vice President in Cambridge Energy Research Associates (CERA).

== See also ==
- Economy of Iran
- International Rankings of Iran in Economy
