= Iason Athanasiadis =

British-Greek journalist

- Education: Oxford University
- Occupations: Writer, photographer, political analyst, and television producer
- Employer: Harvard University

Iason Athanasiadis (Greek: Ιάσων Αθανασιάδης) is a writer, photographer, political analyst, and television producer who has contributed to a range of media, including the BBC, Al Jazeera English, and Channel 4. He specializes in the Middle East.

== Biography ==
A graduate of Oxford University, Iason has written for the Christian Science Monitor, the Financial Times, the International Herald Tribune, the Sunday Telegraph, The Guardian, the Toronto Star, the Spectator, Newsweek, the Washington Times, the Athens News, and Australia's leading current affairs magazine The Diplomat.

He was a Nieman Fellow at Harvard University from 2007 to 2008.

He was detained in Tehran on 17 June 2009, in the course of his reporting on the disputed Iranian elections. No details of his alleged crime were released and no charges were made public. He was released after twenty days of incarceration on 6 July 2009.

Between 2011 and 2018, he worked as a videographer for the United Nations, covering humanitarian crises and political negotiations in Afghanistan, Libya, Jordan, Iraq and Lebanon. He quit the organization to return to freelance journalism.

Iason holds a master's degree from the Tehran School of International Relations.

== See also ==
- List of foreign nationals detained in Iran
