= Manouchehr Mottaki =

Iranian politician and diplomat (born 1953)

- منوچهر متکی
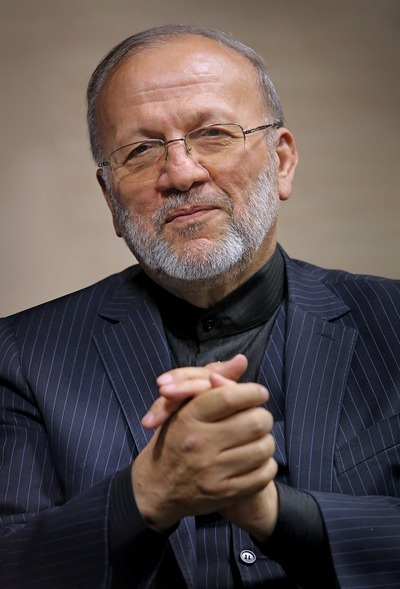
- Mottaki in 2015

Minister of Foreign Affairs of Iran
- In office 24 August 2005 – 13 December 2010
- President: Mahmoud Ahmadinejad
- Preceded by: Kamal Kharazi
- Succeeded by: Ali Akbar Salehi

Ambassador of Iran to Japan
- In office 1995–1999
- President: Akbar Hashemi Rafsanjani Mohammad Khatami
- Preceded by: Hossein Kazempour Ardebili
- Succeeded by: Ali Majedi

Ambassador of Iran to Turkey
- In office 1985–1989
- President: Ali Khamenei
- Preceded by: Mohammad Ganjidost
- Succeeded by: Mohammad Reza Bagheri

Member of the Parliament of Iran
- Incumbent
- Assumed office 27 May 2024
- Constituency: Tehran, Rey, Shemiranat, Eslamshahr and Pardis
- Majority: 404,615 (25.77%)
- In office 27 May 2004 – 24 August 2005
- Constituency: Tehran, Rey, Shemiranat and Eslamshahr
- Majority: 493,214 (25.01%)
- In office 27 May 1980 – 26 May 1984
- Constituency: Bandar Gaz
- Majority: 24,928 (70.25%)

Personal details
- Born: 12 May 1953 (age 73) Bandar Gaz, Iran
- Party: Association of Graduates of Indian Subcontinent
- Other political affiliations: Front of Followers of the Line of the Imam and the Leader; Alliance of Builders of Islamic Iran (2004)

Military service
- Branch/service: Revolutionary Committee
- Years of service: 1979–1980

Manouchehr Mottaki (Persian: منوچهر متکی; born 12 May 1953) is an Iranian politician and diplomat who currently is a member of the Parliament of Iran representing Tehran, Rey, Shemiranat, Eslamshahr and Pardis since 2024. He was the Iranian Minister of Foreign Affairs from 2005 to 2010.

Whilst technically appointed by Mahmoud Ahmadinejad, he is considered to be closer to more pragmatic conservative factions and during the 2005 presidential election, he was the campaign manager of Ali Larijani, the conservative candidate. He was also a presidential candidate in the 2013 presidential election, but withdrew before the polling began. It was rumored that his nomination was rejected by Guardian Council, which he denied.

== Early life and education ==
Mottaki was born in Bandar-e-gaz County in 1953 and went to school there. After graduation, he joined the army and as national plan joined the public education program by that day which was conducted by the government. He went to Khorasan province and established a school in a poor village around Mashhad and taught there. After his service in the army, since he was interested in social and political issues, he decided to travel abroad both for experience and study. By that time many Iranians travelled to India, which was seen as a popular academic destination. So he traveled there for a few years before the Iranian Revolution.

Mottaki earned a bachelor's degree from Bangalore University in India in 1977. He also holds a master's degree in international relations that he received from the University of Tehran.

== Career ==
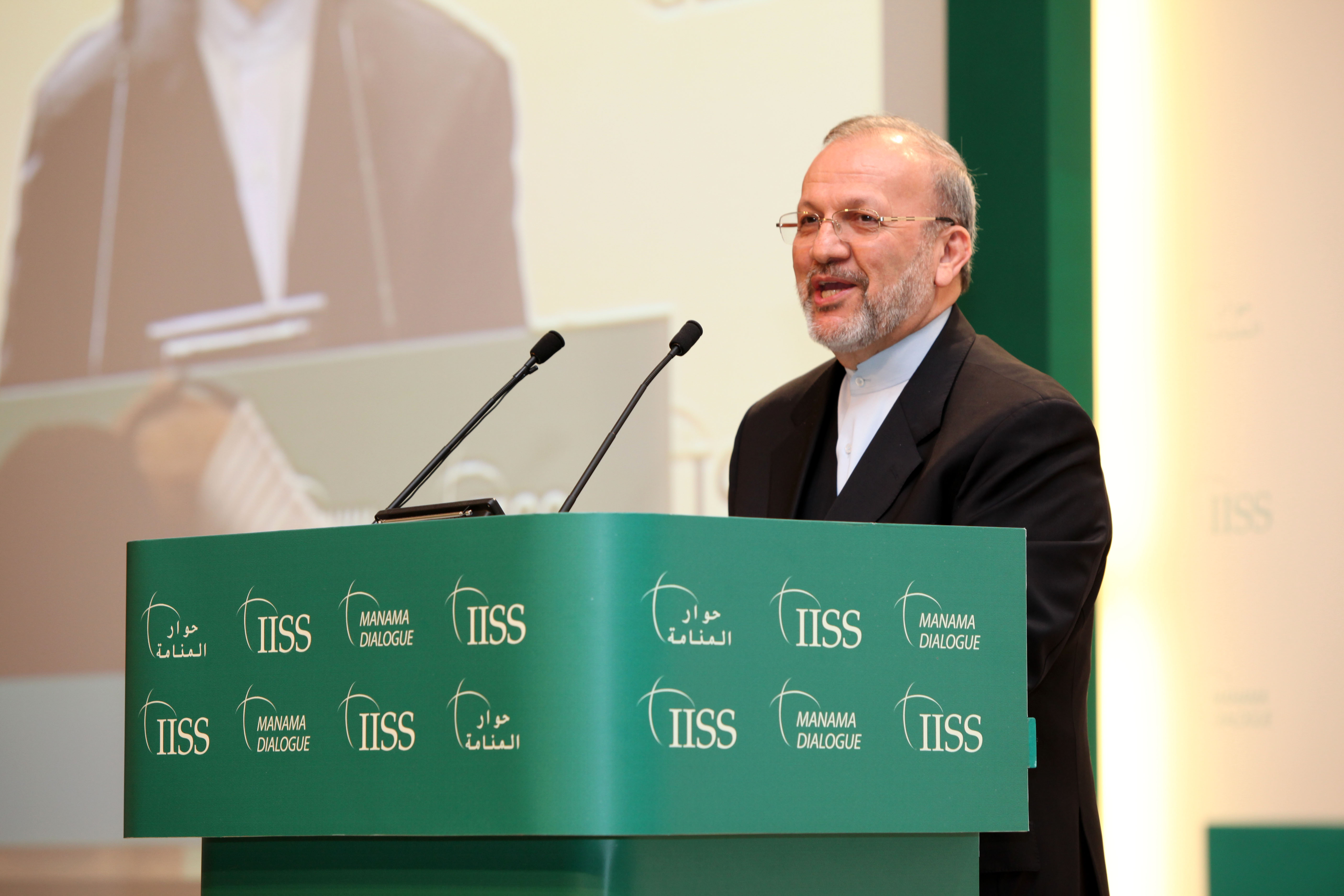
Manouchehr Mottaki, April 2010

After the revolution, Mottaki was elected as the first parliament representative and assigned by other representatives as the head of the national security and foreign policy committee due to his politic and diplomatic talents. During his years in Majlis (Congress) and effective collaboration with the foreign ministry, he was employed by the ministry after parliament. He served as the member of parliament in the first Majlis, head of the 7th political bureau of foreign ministry (1984), Iran's ambassador to Turkey (1985), ministry's secretary general for Western European affairs (1989), deputy foreign minister for international affairs (1989) and deputy foreign minister for legal, consular and parliamentary affairs (1992). He was also Iran's ambassador to Japan (1994), advisor to foreign minister (1999), deputy head of culture and Islamic communications organization (2001) and head of foreign relations committee of the 7th Majlis national security and foreign policy commission. He then developed within the ministry during 24 years of continuous presence in different positions.

On 24 August 2005, Mottaki was appointed foreign minister after the Majlis approved him as minister with 220 votes in favor. He was also appointed foreign minister to the second cabinet of Ahmadinejad in 2009. His term ended on 13 December 2010 when he was dismissed, something that had been widely speculated as a power struggle within the conservative establishment. Mottaki said, "Dismissing a minister during a mission is un-Islamic, undiplomatic and offensive." IRIB reported that Ali Akbar Salehi would replace Mottaki in a caretaker position. Commenting on Mottaki's dismissal, U.S. Secretary of State Hillary Clinton said the U.S. relationship with Iran "is not toward any individual . . . it is toward the country, the government, which is complex and challenging to deal with".

On 27 February 2012, he announced his nomination for the 2013 presidential election. He was supported by Front of Followers of the Line of the Imam and the Leader, which the party later changed its presidential candidate from Mottaki to Mohammad-Hassan Aboutorabi Fard. He registered as a presidential candidate in the first day of nomination in the Ministry of Interior. However, it was reported that Mottaki's nomination will be rejected by Guardian Council. He withdrew from his nomination and suspended his presidential campaign just hours before the council's announcement of final candidates.

=== Views ===
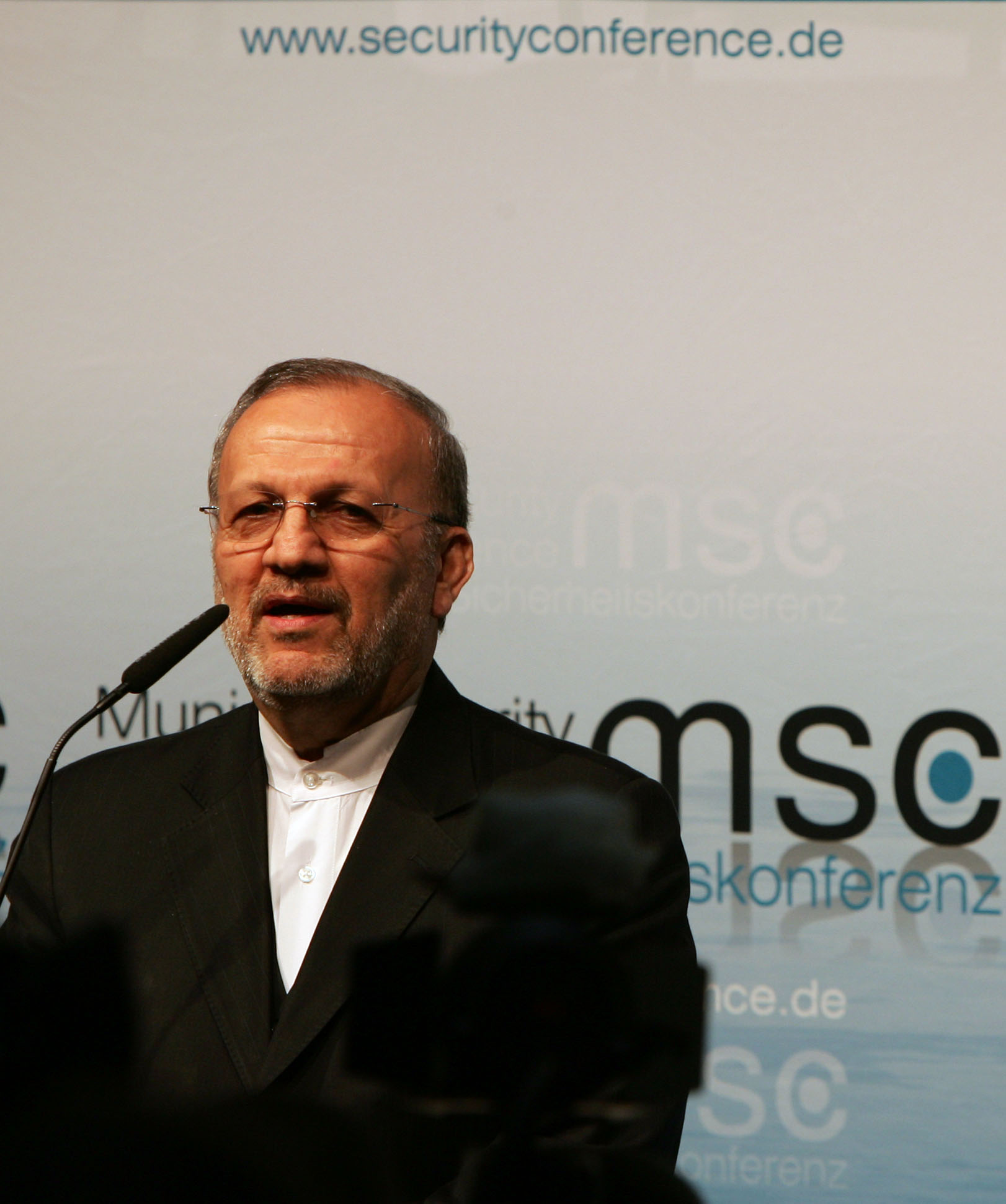
Mottaki in 2010 Munich Security Conference

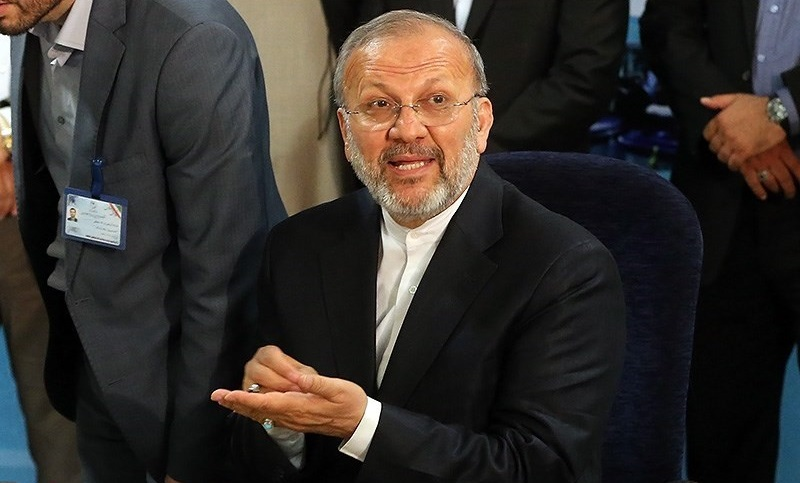
Mottaki registering in the election

Referring to the controversy over Iran's nuclear program, Mottaki said the referral of the issue to the UN Security Council would be a detrimental move. He called for negotiations and said Iran does not seek nuclear weapons, and instead wants the same rights as other members of the Nuclear Nonproliferation Treaty.

Mottaki condemned the outcry over President Ahmadinejad's comments on Israel, calling them a "misunderstanding." At the same time, he called the Israeli government a "Zionist regime" and said of Israel that Iran was "facing a mad people, which is ruled by madmen."

In July, 2010, in one report from the International Foreign Ministerial Meeting in Kabul, "American, European and other foreign leaders [including] ... Mottaki ... and Pakistan's Foreign Minister Shah Mehmood Qureshi [and] Secretary-General of the United Nations Ban Ki-moon met ... to pledge anew their support for Afghanistan as they committed to complete transition of security and budgeting responsibility to the Afghan government by 2014. They acknowledged that neither the people of their own countries nor those in Afghanistan had much patience left. ... The Iranian Foreign Minister used the conference as an opportunity to get in some digs at the foreign forces. The criticism came just a few weeks after the United Nations Security Council voted to enforce sanctions against Iran for failing to halt its nuclear program. 'The presence and increase in the number of foreign forces is one of the factors in the insecurity, violence and dissatisfaction of the public,' said ... Mottaki .... A moment later the United Nations special representative to Afghanistan, Staffan de Mistura, interrupted and told him to get to the point." Another report from Kabul added "Mottaki accused the U.S., Pakistan and allied forces of utilizing Afghanistan to support terrorist strikes inside Iran, including last week's bomb blasts in ... Zahedan, ... Sistan-Baluchistan province." This report said United States Secretary of State Hillary Clinton "hadn't heard [the] comments ... charging the U.S. with supporting terrorism inside Iran"; and said that "Mottaki exceeded his allotted time giving his speech, earning a rebuke from the conference's organizers. The Iranian diplomat said he had the right to give an extended account of the situation in Afghanistan, as Iran has been forced to absorb three million Afghans evading the fighting in their country." A third report said, in part, that Mottaki said "Increase in terrorism because of the active support of the US and NATO of terrorist groups in the region as part of their policy to sow ethnic and religious discord, is proof of the fact that the undesirable presence of the occupation forces has intensified insecurity and violence. Today, insecurity is not just plaguing the Afghan people but is in fact directly mushrooming in neighbouring states, especially in Pakistan."

Mottaki defended the International Conference to Review the Global Vision of the Holocaust as a "gathering of truth-seekers". He also claimed that "there has never been such a phenomenon as Antisemitism" in the Muslim world.

== Honors ==
- Grand Cordon of the Order of the Rising Sun, 2017

Political offices
Preceded by Kamal Kharazi	Minister of Foreign Affairs; 2005–2010	Succeeded by Ali Akbar Salehi
