= Iran–Jordan relations =

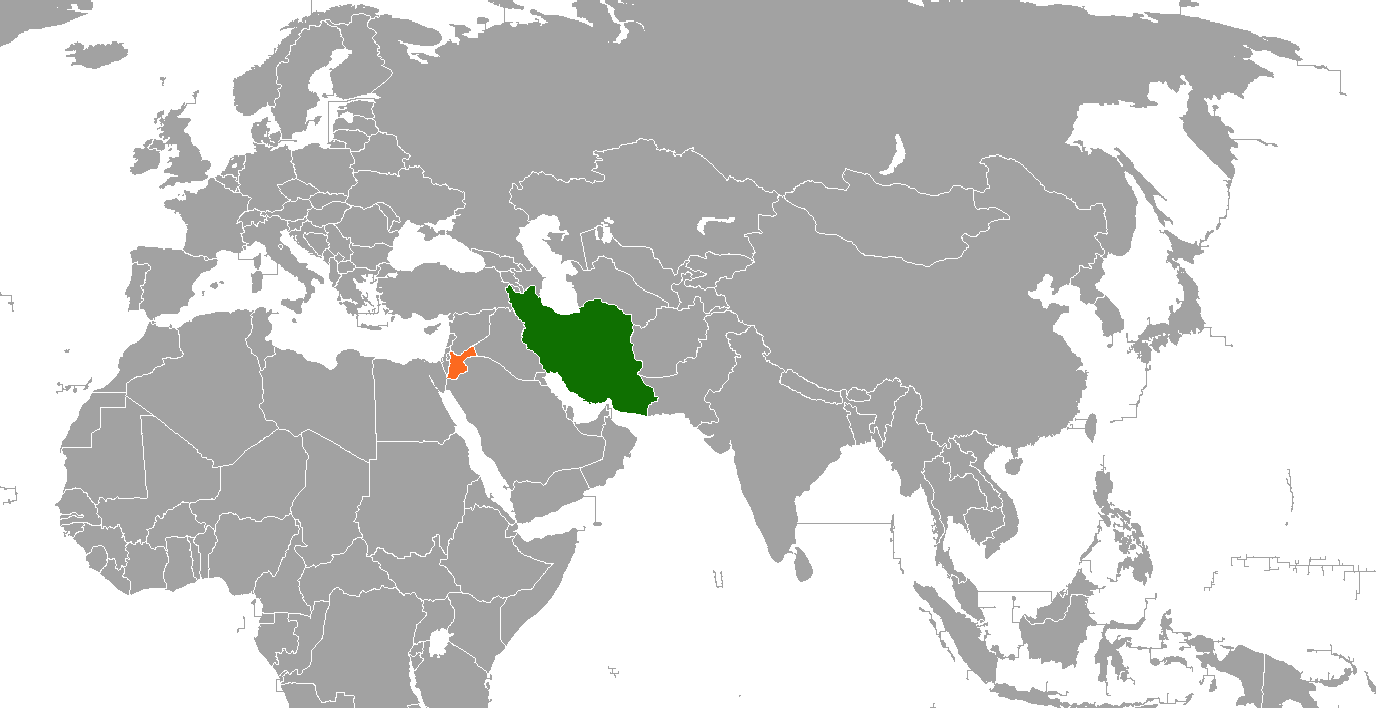

- Iran: Jordan

The Islamic Republic of Iran and Hashemite Kingdom of Jordan share a long and complicated relationship which has, at times, been tense and unstable. Jordan has an embassy in Tehran.

== Historical relations ==
=== Antiquity ===
While there had been historical contacts between the two nations, for most of Jordanian history, the country fell under various Persian rule which started from the Achaemenid Empire to the Sasanian Empire. Both countries later embraced Islam, though Jordan went to become a Sunni country in contrast to the Shi'a-dominated Iran.

=== Pahlavi Iran ===
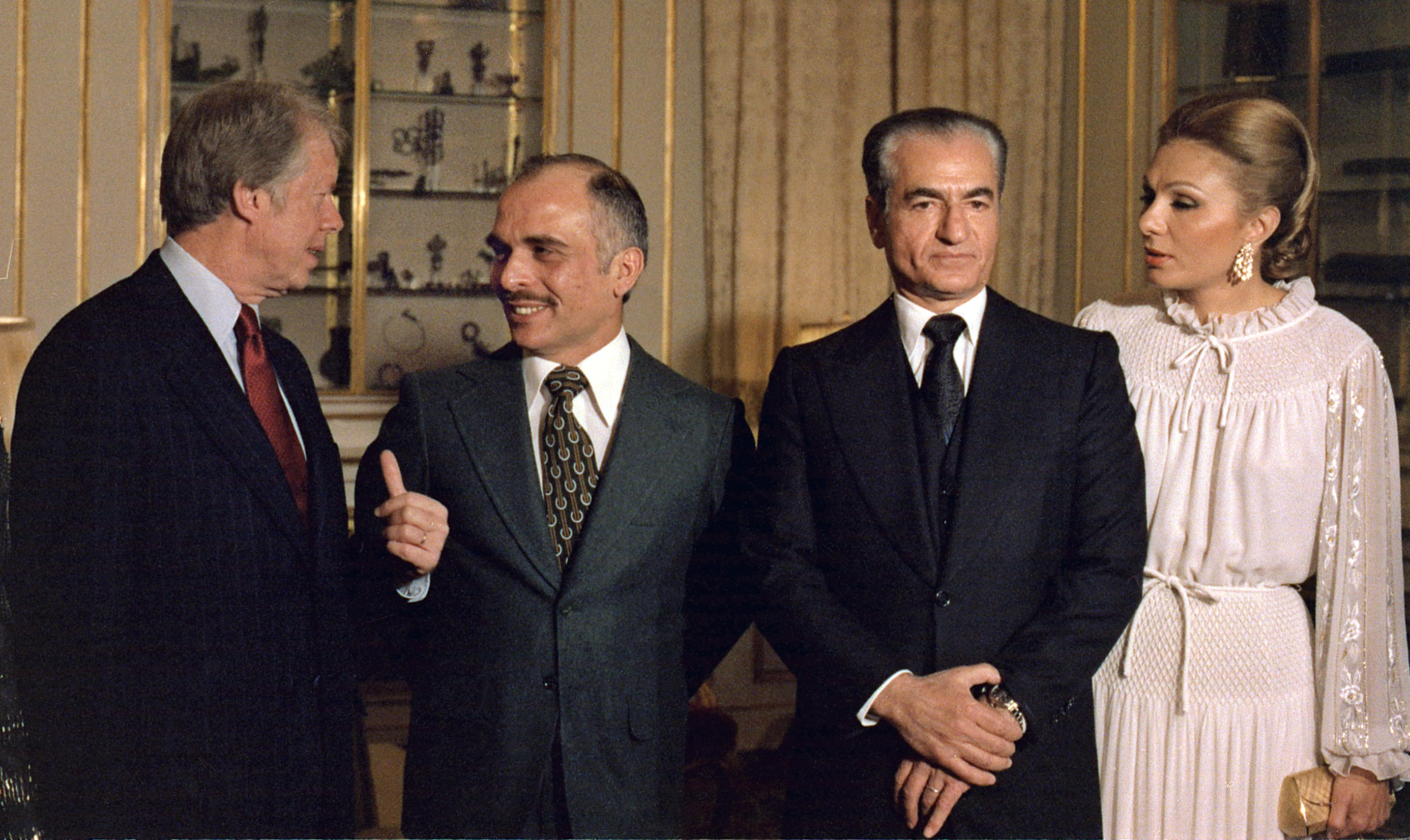
American President Jimmy Carter with King Hussein of Jordan, the Shah of Iran, Mohammad Reza Pahlavi, and Queen Farah Pahlavi of Iran, 31 December 1977.

Iranian–Jordanian relations under the Pahlavi dynasty in Iran was cordial, being pro-West oriented and hostile against communism. In the 1950s, King Hussein of Jordan inaugurated a Jordanian embassy in Tehran, officially establishing relations with Iran. However, sometimes the relationship was tense, as Iran under Pahlavi dynasty had official relations with Israel, which Jordan did not. Nonetheless, they were able to have a secure and healthy relationship. Hussein also made a number of visits to Iran under Pahlavi.

=== Islamic Republic of Iran ===
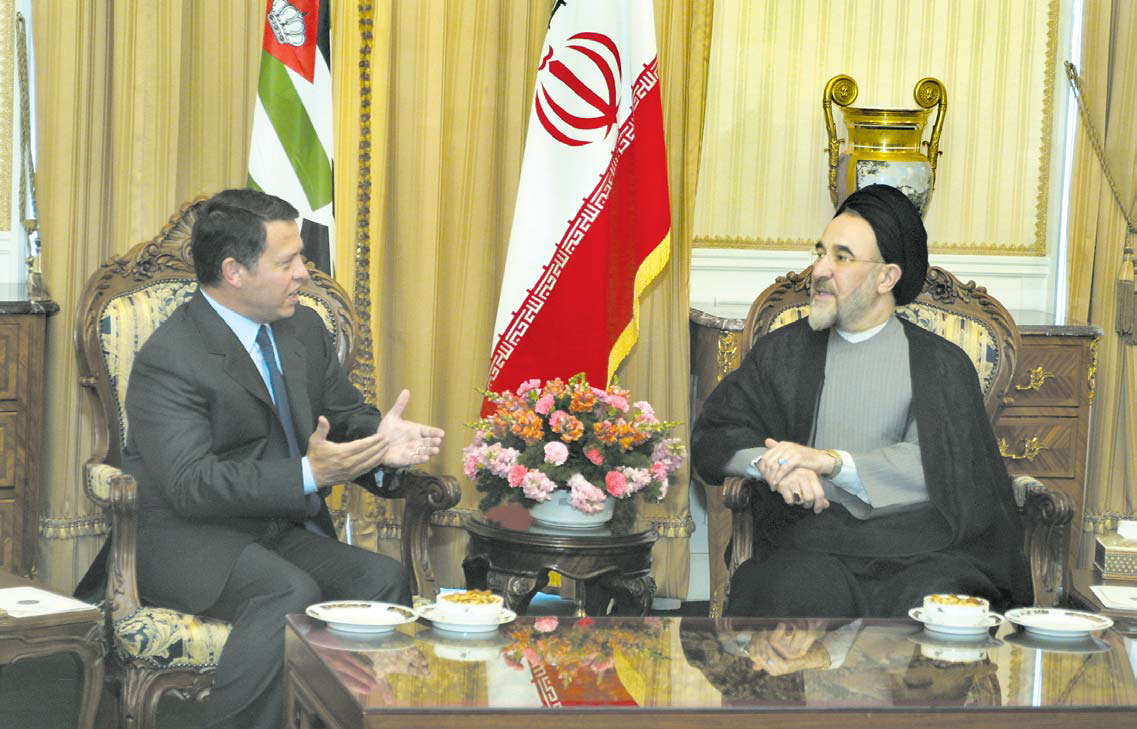
King Abdullah II (left) with Iranian president Mohammad Khatami during the Abdullah's visit to Iran, September 2, 2003.

The outbreak of Iranian Revolution and subsequent establishment of an Islamic republic in Iran changed their relationship drastically from positive to negative. Jordan, along with most of the Arabian states of the Persian gulf, immediately backed Saddam Hussein on the Iran–Iraq War of 1980s. Due to Jordan's support for Iraq, even during the Gulf War, it took a decade before Iran and Jordan could re-normalize their relations.

On 2 and 3 September 2003, King Abdullah II of Jordan visited Tehran, making him the first Jordanian king to visit Tehran since the launching of the Islamic revolution in Iran in 1979.

Nonetheless, the relation between the two countries remain tense, with Iran seeing Jordan's alliance with the West as a threat, and there being little economic cooperation between the two countries. In 2018, Jordan ruled out economic ties, reasoning that Iran is not a member of the World Trade Organization.

==== Syrian Civil War ====
Jordan's relations with Iran became even more complicated as Jordan unofficially came out against the government of Bashar al-Assad in Syria (an ally of Iran), considering Iranian long-term presence in Syria as a threat to its security. Jordan was also alleged to have been working with Saudi Arabia, Russia, and Israel in an attempt to curb Iranian involvement in Syria.

On July 19, 2021, US president Joe Biden met with Jordanian King Abdullah II and discussed, among other things, the future of the Syrian crisis. In that meeting, King Abdullah suggested Biden to cooperate with Russia and the Syrian Government to help stabilize Syria and restore Syrian sovereignty and unity.

==== Iraq ====
During the rule of Saddam Hussein, Jordan maintained a "special status" with Iraq as it relied on Iraqi oil. Iraq also relied on Jordan during this time for use of its ports, as the UN had placed sanctions on Iraq for the invasion of Kuwait.

This support of Baathist Iraq resulted in a complete severance of ties between Jordan and Iran on January 31, 1981, and since then relations have remained fairly hostile, even after the two countries resumed diplomatic ties in 1991.

==== Jordan's ties with Israel and Saudi Arabia ====
Another key reason for tensions between Jordan and Iran is Jordan's relationship with Saudi Arabia and Israel.

For many years, Jordan heavily depended on Saudi economic assistance. Jordan also shares similar political structure with Saudi Arabia, both are Arab monarchies and closely tied to the West. Growing Iranian influence brought Jordan and Saudi Arabia closer, with both denouncing Iran together in spite of the rise of Crown Prince Mohammed Bin Salman.

Jordan also shares a close tie with Israel, since the Hashemites had unofficial relations with Israel throughout the Cold War until 1994, when the two countries established relations.

The Iranian Government has called for the elimination of Israel and pro-West Arab monarchies, prompting anti-Iranian reactions in both Jordan and Israel.

Some have alleged Saudi Arabian and Israeli involvement in the failed April 2021 coup attempt in Jordan, which has been related to Jordanian unofficial opposition to the 'deal of the century' proposed by the United States as a solution to the Israeli-Palestinian Conflict.

==== Qatar crisis ====
Both Iran and Jordan had called to solve the Qatar crisis diplomatically in hope to limit tensions. Jordan, while still maintaining its diplomatic presence within the country, had limited ties with Qatar, as Jordan is dependent on Gulf economically, especially after the 2018 Jordanian protests. On the other side, Jordan feared the escalation of tensions between Qatar and its Gulf neighbors Saudi Arabia, Bahrain and the United Arab Emirates might give Iran an upper hand.

==== The New Levant Initiative ====
On 27 June 2021, at a trilateral summit in Baghdad, the Jordanian king announced an agreement with Egypt and Iraq to increase cooperation and trade, including the transport of oil from Iraq through Jordan (and Egypt). This officially became known as the “New Levant Initiative'' (NLI). Following this agreement, Jordanian state media began promoting Iranian-Jordanian cooperation, and suggesting that this deal would increase Jordanian ties with Iran. It was suggested that Iran could build an airport in al-Kerak, and begin the supply of oil to Jordan via Iraq to fulfill Jordan's economic needs. Some Jordanian politicians such as Zaid Nabulsi, a member of the king's advisory board, and Mouafaq Mahadeen, a journalist with close ties to the ruling family, have also began promoting the idea of Iranian religious tourism to the shrine of Jafar ibn Abu Talib in the city of Karak, the home of Jordan's Shiite minority. Jordanian king Abdullah II also visited the site of the shrine in July 2021 in an attempt to promote it.

==== Iran-Israel war ====
On 13 April 2024, Iran for the first time fired missiles directly at Israel, Jordan's neighbour. Most of them were shot down by Israeli, American, British and Jordanian military personnel. Iran then made threats towards Jordan.

In October 2024, following Iran's strikes against Israel, Jordan, along with other Arab countries, has been warned by Iran through secret diplomatic channels not to assist Israel or the US in any retaliatory attack on Iran. Arab officials have indicated that Iran would retaliate against these states if their territories or airspace were used in such operations.

==== 2026 Iran war ====
During the 2026 Iran War, Jordan tried to maintain neutral while facing growing security pressures due to its strategic location in the Middle East. Officials, including Foreign Minister Ayman Safadi, have repeatedly stated that the kingdom will not allow its territory or airspace to be used for attacks against Iran and will not become a battlefield in the conflict. At the same time, Jordanian air defenses have intercepted drones and missiles entering its airspace as fighting between Israel, the United States, and Iran spreads across the region. International concern has also grown after reports that foreign partners and additional defensive systems were deployed to help protect U.S. military bases in Jordan from Iranian drone attacks.

== Iranian network intelligence in Jordan ==
Iranian intelligence networks in Jordan became more active after the establishment of an Islamic regime in Iran. In 2004, Jordanian King Abdullah II accused Ahmed Chalabi, an Iraqi, of being an Iranian agent conspiring to attack Jordan.

In 2018, a top military commander of the Armed Forces of the Islamic Republic of Iran, Brigadier General Ahmad Reza Pourdastan, revealed that Iran had intelligence data about military activity in a number of Arab countries in the Middle East, including Jordan, and threatened to attack if provoked.

== Iranian embassy ==
The Iranian embassy is located in Amman.

- Ambassador Mojtaba Ferdosipour

== Jordanian embassy ==
The Jordanian embassy is located in Tehran.

- Ambassador Nizar Nathir Mustafa Al-Qaisi
