= Mehdi Danesh-Yazdi =

Iranian politician (born 1952)

Mehdi Danesh-Yazdi (born 1952 in Yazd) is currently an Iranian attorney-at-law and a member of the Iranian Central Bar Association. He previously served as the Deputy Minister of Foreign Affairs for Administrative and Financial Affairs of Iran until his retirement in January 2018. He served as Ambassador and Deputy Permanent Representative to the United Nations in New York from 1995 to 1999 and also 2003 to 2008 and Ambassador to Sweden from 1987 to 1992. At the international level, he served as President of the UNICEF Executive Board in 2005 and as Chairman of the United Nations Commission for Social Development in 2006. He was the President of the Asian-African Legal Consultative Organization from 2014 to 2015.He joined the Ministry of Foreign Affairs as Director for the Department of Treaties in 1982.
