= Abdolali Bazargan =

Iranian politician

- عبدالعلی بازرگان
- Born: 14 August 1943 (age 83); Tehran, Iran
- Education: Shahid Beheshti University
- Political party: Freedom Movement of Iran
- Children: 3
- Parent(s): Mehdi Bazargan; Malak Tabatabayi

Abdolali Bazargan (Persian: عبدالعلی بازرگان, pronounced [æbdolæˈliː bɒːzæɾˈɡɒːn]; born 14 August 1943) is an Iranian liberal politician, writer and intellectual who is current deputy leader of Freedom Movement of Iran. He was one of five major figures in the Green Movement to author a manifesto calling for the resignation of Iranian President Mahmoud Ahmadinejad in 2009.

== Early life ==
He was born on 14 August 1943 in Tehran. He is the son of Mehdi Bazargan, Iran's first prime minister following the Iranian Revolution in 1979. He is married and has three children.

== Political life ==
He joined the National Front of Iran in 1961 but in 1963 he left party and joined to his father's established party Freedom Movement in 1977.
