= Mahmoud Mohammadi =

Iranian diplomat and politician

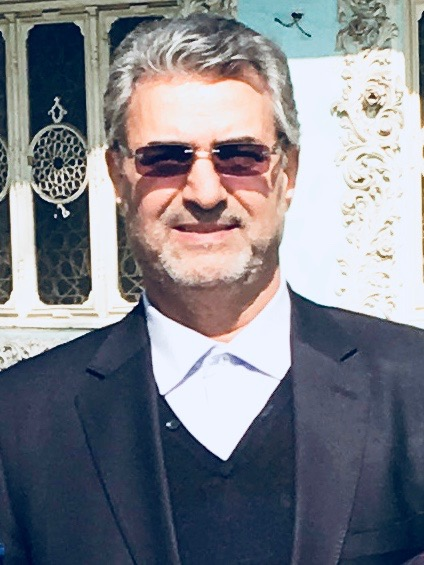

Ambassador of Iran to Algeria
- In office 2010–2014
- President: Mahmoud Ahmadinejad

Member of the Parliament
- In office 28 May 2004 – 28 May 2008
- Constituency: Abadeh
- Majority: 32,048 (35.23)

Ambassador of Iran to Tunisia
- In office 1999–2003
- President: Mohammad Khatami

Ambassador of Iran to United Kingdom
- In office 1998–1999
- President: Mohammad Khatami

Spokesperson for the Ministry of Foreign Affairs of Iran
- In office 1992 – 16 November 1998
- President: Akbar Hashemi Rafsanjani Mohammad Khatami
- Preceded by: Morteza Sarmadi
- Succeeded by: Hamid-Reza Assefi

Personal details
- Born: 1953 (age 72–73) Abadeh, Iran
- Party: Moderation and Development Party
- Education: Università degli Studi di Napoli "L'Orientale"

Mahmoud Mohammadi (Persian: محمود محمدی) is an Iranian diplomat and politician.

Diplomatic posts
Preceded by Morteza Sarmadi	Spokesperson for the Ministry of Foreign Affairs of Iran; 1992–1998	Succeeded by Hamid-Reza Assefi
