= Marzieh Afkham =

Iranian diplomat

- مرضیه افخم
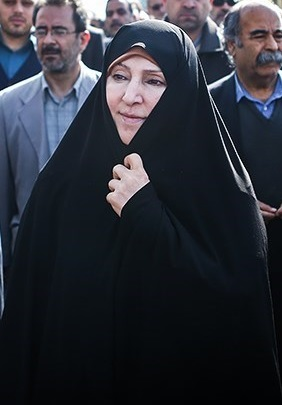

Iranian Ambassador to Slovenia
- Incumbent
- Assumed office March 2025
- President: Masoud Pezeshkian
- Minister: Abbas Araghchi
- Preceded by: Kazem Shafeei

Iranian Ambassador to Malaysia
- In office 1 December 2015 – 15 November 2019
- President: Hassan Rouhani
- Minister: Mohammad Javad Zarif
- Preceded by: Mohammad Jalal Firouznia
- Succeeded by: Ali Asghar Mohammadi

Spokesperson for the Ministry of Foreign Affairs
- In office 1 September 2013 – 8 November 2015
- President: Hassan Rouhani
- Preceded by: Abbas Araghchi
- Succeeded by: Hossein Jaberi Ansari

Personal details
- Born: December 1962/January 1963 (age 63) Tehran, Iran
- Education: Allameh Tabatabaei University; Islamic Azad University

Marzieh Afkham (Persian: مرضیه افخم) is an Iranian diplomat who serves as the Iranian ambassador to Slovenia since 2025. She also served as the ambassador to Malaysia for four years. She is considered "one of Iran's most high-profile female public figures".

Afkham is the former spokeswoman and head of the Center for Public and Media Diplomacy in Iran's Ministry of Foreign Affairs, the first female spokesperson for the ministry. On 8 November 2015 she was appointed as ambassador to Malaysia, becoming the first female Iranian ambassador since the 1979 revolution and the second in history after Mehrangiz Dowlatshahi.

== See also ==
- List of Iranian women politicians

Diplomatic posts
Preceded by Abbas Araghchi	Spokesperson for the Ministry of Foreign Affairs of Iran; 2013–2015	Succeeded by Hossein Jaberi Ansari
