= Ali Mousavi (diplomat) =

Iranian diplomat

Ambassador of Iran to the United Kingdom
- Incumbent
- Assumed office 3 February 2025
- President: Masoud Pezeshkian
- Preceded by: Ali Matinfar (Chargé d'affaires)

Seyed Ali Mousavi is an Iranian diplomat, serving as the Ambassador of Iran to the United Kingdom since 2025. He previously served as Director General of the Department for International Legal Affairs for Iran's Ministry of Foreign Affairs.

== Career ==
On 3 February 2025, Mousavi was appointed Ambassador to the United Kingdom.

On 19 May 2025, Mousavi was summoned by the Foreign, Commonwealth and Development Office in response to the three Iranian nationals charged under the National Security Act.

On 12 June 2025, Mousavi presented his credentials to King Charles III.

On 17 June 2025, Mousavi testified in front of the House of Commons Foreign Affairs Committee that Iran's nuclear program was “only peaceful”.

On 17 June 2025, Mousavi testified in front of the House of Commons Foreign Affairs Committee that Iran's nuclear program was “only peaceful”.

On 29 April 2026, Mousavi was summoned by the Foreign, Commonwealth and Development Office following social media posts by the Iranian embassy that UK officials described as “unacceptable and inflammatory”. Reports indicated that a message on the embassy’s Telegram channel appeared to encourage Iranian expatriates to “sacrifice their lives” and “lay down our lives” in defence of Iran. The Foreign Office stated that such communications were “completely unacceptable” and must cease.
