= School of International Relations =

Iranian higher education institution

- دانشکده روابط بین‌الملل وزارت امور خارجه
- Type: Institute of higher education
- Affiliations: Ministry of Foreign Affairs
- Dean: Dr. Mohammad Reza Dehshiri
- Location: Tehran, Iran
- Website: Official website

The School of International Relations (SIR) (Persian: دانشکده روابط بین‌الملل وزارت امور خارجه) is an institute of higher education in Tehran, Iran. It trains an international student body. It is run by the Iranian Ministry of Foreign Affairs, under the supervision of the Iranian Ministry of Science, Research and Technology.

More than 750 of the school's graduates have held diplomatic and government positions inside and outside Iran.

SIR houses the Iranian Diplomatic Training Center (DTC) who trains domestic as well as foreign young diplomats. Mohammad Javad Zarif is a faculty member of the school.

Iason Athanasiadis is a graduate of the school.

== Faculty members ==
- Mohammad Javad Zarif, Former Foreign Minister
- Abbas Araghchi, Foreign Minister
- Mohammad Kazem Sajjadpour, Former Head of the Institute for Political and International Studies (IPIS)
