= Muhsin =

- Pronunciation: Arabic: [ˈmʊħsɪn, ˈmoħsen]
- Gender: Male

Origin
- Language: Arabic

Other names
- Variant form: Mohssen (United States)

Muhsin, Mouhsine, Mohsen, Mohsin, Mukhsin, Mohsine, Mohseen, or Muhsen (Arabic: محسن) is a masculine given name and surname of Arabic origin. The first person known to have the name "Muhsin" was Muhsin ibn Ali, the son of Ali ibn Abi Talib and Fatimah bint Muhammad. In Arabic, it means "the one who beautifies, improves, or enriches, particularly one's worship of or relationship with God, or one's actions or conduct toward others". It can also mean "helper, attractive, beneficent, benefactor, or charitable". Notable people with the name include:

== Given name ==
=== Mohseen ===
- Mohseen Moosa, South African lawyer, businessman, and politician

=== Mohsen ===
- Mohsen Adeli (born 1972), Iranian chemist
- Mohsen Aghahosseini (born 1975), Iranian judge and arbitrator
- Mohsen Heidari Alekasir (born 1957), Iranian Shia cleric
- Mohsen Alijani-Zamani, Iranian physician and politician
- Mohsen Alimardani (born 1968), Iranian politician
- Mohsen Ali Haidarah Qasem Alomari (born 1970), Yemeni politician and aviation executive
- Mohsen Amini (born 1993), Scottish musician
- Mohsen Aminzadeh (born 1957), Iranian politician and diplomat
- Mohsen Amiraslani (1977–2014), Iranian psychoanalyst
- Mohsen Amiryoussefi (born 1972), Iranian director and screenwriter
- Mohsen Amoo-Aghaei, Iranian Paralympic athlete
- Mohsen Mohamed Anani (born 1985), Egyptian hammer thrower
- Mohsen Araki (born 1956), Iranian scholar, cleric, university lecturer, and politician
- Mohsen Armin (born 1954), Iranian politician
- Mohsen Arzani (born 1984), Iranian footballer
- Mohsen Ashouri (born 1965), Iranian football player and coach
- Mohsen Ayed (born 1976), Yemeni author, journalist, and human rights activist
- Mohsen Azad, Iranian footballer
- Mohsen Azarbad (born 1989), Iranian footballer
- Mohsen Babasafari (born 1987), Iranian handball player
- Mohsen Badawi (born 1956), Egyptian businessman
- Mohsen Baharvand (born 1966), Iranian diplomat
- Mohsen Bahmani (born 1988), Iranian-German inventor and mechanical engineer
- Mohsen Bahrami (born 1982), Iranian actor, presenter, and voice actor
- Mohsen Bahramzadeh (born 1990), Iranian weightlifter
- Mohsen Bakhtiar (born 1998), Iranian Paralympic powerlifter
- Mohsen Bayat (born 1984), Iranian footballer
- Mohsen Bayatinia (born 1980), Iranian football player and coach
- Mohsen Beiranvand (born 1981), Iranian weightlifter
- Mohsen Bengar (born 1979), Iranian football player and coach
- Mohsen Chavoshi (born 1979), Iranian musician, singer, record producer, and songwriter
- Mohsen Chegini (born 1967), Iranian film producer and director
- Mohsen al-Daeri (born 1965), Yemeni Army officer
- Mohsen Dalloul (1933–2026), Lebanese journalist and politician
- Mohsen Darrebaghi (1963–2026), Iranian Army general
- Mohsen Delir (born 1988), Iranian footballer
- Mohsen Al-Duhaylib (born 1994), Saudi weightlifter
- Mohsen Ebrahimzadeh (born 1987), Iranian singer
- Mohsen Al-Eisa (born 1987), Saudi footballer
- Mohsen Eliasi (born 1985), Iranian footballer
- Mohsen Emadi (born 1976), Iranian-Mexican poet, translator, and filmmaker
- Mohsen Eslamzadeh (born 1980), Iranian documentary filmmaker
- Mohsen Esmaeili (born 1964), Iranian politician
- Mohsen Fakhrizadeh (1958–2020), Iranian nuclear physicist
- Mohsen al-Fanagry, Egyptian Army officer
- Mohsen Faqihi (born 1952), Iranian Shia cleric
- Mohsen Safaei Farahani (born 1948), Iranian politician
- Mohsen Farahvashi (born 1947), Iranian wrestler
- Mohsen Foroughi (1907–1983), Iranian architect
- Mohsen Forouzan (born 1988), Iranian footballer
- Mohsen Al-Garni (born 1985), Saudi footballer
- Mohsen Garousi (born 1968), Iranian football player and manager
- Mohsen Ghaedpouri (born 1982), Iranian footballer
- Mohsen Ghahremani (born 1974), Iranian football referee
- Mohsen Gharaei (born 1984), Iranian film director and screenwriter
- Mohsen Gheytaslou (1990–2016), Iranian soldier
- Mohsen Gilani, Pakistani football administrator
- Mohsen Goudarzi, Iranian Islamic scholar
- Mohsen Abo Gresha (born 1981), Egyptian footballer
- Mohsen Habacha (1942–2025), Tunisian footballer
- Mohsen Haji-Mirzaei (born 1959), Iranian politician
- Mohsen Hajipour (born 1988), Iranian Greco-Roman wrestler
- Mohsen Abdel Hamid (born 1937), Iraqi politician and Islamic scholar
- Mohsen Hamidi (born 1985), Iranian footballer
- Mohsen Al-Hashemi (born 1990), Emirati footballer
- Mohsen Hashtroodi (1907–1976), Iranian mathematician, public intellectual, and lecturer
- Mohsen Hassanzadeh (born 1974), Iranian futsal coach and player
- Mohsen al-Haymed, Syrian militant
- Mohsen Hendawy (born 1981), Egyptian footballer
- Mohsen Hojaji (1991–2017), Iranian Army officer
- Mohsen Hojeij, Lebanese businessman
- Mohsen Hosseini (born 1985), Iranian footballer
- Mohsen Ibrahim (1935–2020), Lebanese politician
- Mohsen Irannejad (born 1985), Iranian footballer
- Mohsen Izadi, Iranian mechanical engineer and academic
- Mohsen Kadivar (born 1959), Iranian philosopher
- Mohsen Kaedi (born 1987), Iranian Paralympic athlete
- Mohsen Karami (born 1995), Iranian footballer
- Mohsen Karimi (born 1994), Iranian footballer
- Mohsen Fayz Kashani (1598–1680), Iranian Akhbari Twelver Shi'i mystic, poet, philosopher, and muhaddith
- Mohsen Khalili (born 1981), Iranian footballer
- Mohsen Kharazi (born 1937), Iranian Shia cleric
- Mohsen Khazaei (1972–2016), Iranian correspondent
- Mohsen Kouhkan (born 1957), Iranian economist and politician
- Mohsen Labidi (born 1954), Tunisian footballer
- Mohsen Mahdawi, Palestinian activist
- Mohsen Makhmalbaf (born 1957), Iranian filmmaker
- Mohsen Marzouk (born 1965), Tunisian politician
- Mohsen Mehralizadeh (born 1956), Iranian politician
- Mohsen Milani, American political scientist, foreign policy analyst, academic, and public commentator
- Mohsen Mirabi (born 1983), Iranian footballer
- Mohsen Mirdamadi (born 1955), Iranian politician
- Mohsen Moazami, Iranian-American entrepreneur
- Mohsen Moeini (born 1979), Iranian author and director
- Mohsen Moghaddam (1900–1987), Iranian archaeologist, art historian, painter, academic, and art collector
- Mohsen Mohammadpour (2002–2019), Iranian protester
- Mohsen Mohammadseifi (born 1989), Iranian mixed martial artist and wushu athlete
- Mohsen Mosalman (born 1991), Iranian footballer
- Mohsen Mostafavi (born 1954), Iranian-American architect and educator
- Mohsen Nabavi (born 1979), Iranian-Canadian director, scriptwriter, and actor
- Mohsen Naghavi, Iranian-American researcher
- Mohsen Namjoo (born 1976), Iranian musician
- Mohsen Neysani (born 1982), Iranian footballer
- Mohsen Nourbakhsh (1948–2003), Iranian economist
- Mohsen Paknejad (born 1966), Iranian politician
- Mohsen Pezeshkpour (1927–2011), Iranian politician
- Mohsen Pirhadi (born 1980), Iranian politician
- Mohsen Qarawi (born 1989), Yemeni footballer
- Mohsen Qomi (born 1960), Iranian Shia cleric and politician
- Mohsen Rabbani (born 1983), Iranian pole vaulter
- Mohsen Rabikhah (born 1987), Iranian footballer
- Mohsen Beheshti Rad (born 1984), Iranian mountaineer and competition climber
- Mohsen Jafari Rad (1986–2022), Iranian journalist, film writer, critic, and film director
- Mohsen Rafighdoost (born 1940), Iranian Army officer and politician
- Mohsen Hashemi Rafsanjani (born 1961), Iranian politician, academic, and engineer
- Mohsen Rais (1895–1975), Iranian diplomat and politician
- Mohsen Rastani (1958–2026), Iranian photographer
- Mohsen Modarres Razavy (born 1934), Iranian-Canadian theoretical physicist
- Mohsen Rezaee (taekwondo) (born 1998), Afghan taekwondo practitioner
- Mohsen Rezaei (born 1954), Iranian Army officer and politician
- Mohsen Rohami (born 1963), Iranian lawyer, Shia cleric, and politician
- Mohsen Rouholamini (1984–2009), Iranian protester and prisoner
- Mohsen Sadr (1871–1962), Iranian politician
- Mohsen Saleh (born 1949), Egyptian football analyst, player, and manager
- Mohsen Sarhan (1914–1993), Egyptian actor
- Mohsen Sazegara (born 1955), Iranian journalist and political activist
- Mohsen Shaalan (1951–2014), Egyptian artist and politician
- Mohsen Mojtahed Shabestari (1937–2021), Iranian Shia cleric
- Mohsen Shadi (born 1988), Iranian rower
- Mohsen Shah-Ebrahimi (born 1954), Iranian art director, costume designer, and actor
- Mohsen Shahinpoor (born 1943), Iranian-American engineer and researcher
- Mohsen Sorkhou (born 1956), Iranian politician
- Mohsen Subhi (1963–2009), Palestinian musician
- Mohsen al-Sukkari, Egyptian police officer and assassin
- Mohsen Tabatabaei (1927–??), Iranian weightlifter
- Mohsen Koochebaghi Tabrizi (1924–2011), Iranian Shia cleric
- Mohsen Taheri (born 1968), Iranian handball player, coach, and football administrator
- Mohsen Tanabandeh (born 1975), Iranian actor, screenwriter, and director
- Mohsen Torky (born 1973), Iranian football referee
- Mohsen Vaziri-Moghaddam (1924–2018), Iranian painter and academic
- Mohsen Vezvaei (1960–1982), Iranian Army officer
- Mohsen Medhat Warda (born 1955), Egyptian basketball player
- Mohsen Yazdani (born 1969), Iranian bodybuilder
- Mohsen Al-Yazidi (born 1987), Qatari footballer
- Mohsen Yeganeh (born 1985), Iranian singer, songwriter, composer, arranger, musician, and music producer
- Mohsen Yousefi (footballer, born 1954) (born 1954), Iranian footballer
- Mohsen Yousefi (footballer, born 1984) (born 1984), Iranian footballer
- Mohsen Asle Zaeem, American materials scientist and engineer
- Mohsen Zayed (1944–2003), Egyptian author, writer, and screenwriter

=== Mohsin ===
- Mohsin Uddin Ahmed (1939–1981), Bangladeshi Army general
- Mohsin Ahmad al-Aini (1932–2021), Yemeni politician
- Mohsin Ali (born 1987), Pakistani track and field athlete
- Mohsin Ali (cricketer), Kenyan cricketer
- Mohsin Ali (footballer) (born 1996), Pakistani footballer
- Mohsin Aziz, Pakistani politician
- Mohsin Bhopali (1932–2007), Pakistani poet
- Mohsin Changezi, (born 1979), Pakistani poet
- Mohsin Charania (born 1985), American poker player
- Mohsin Dawar (born 1984), Pakistani politician
- Mohsin Ahmedbhai Dodia (born 1984), Indian cricketer
- Mohsin Fani (1615–??), Persian historian
- Mohsin Abbas Haider (born 1986), Pakistani actor, singer-songwriter, music composer, poet, and television presenter
- Mohsin Hamid (born 1971), British-Pakistani author
- Mohsin Al-Harbi (born 1980), Omani footballer
- Mohsin al-Harthi (born 1976), Saudi footballer
- Mohsin Iqbal (born 1983), Indian cricketer
- Mohsin Issa (born 1971), British-Indian businessman
- Mohsin Kamal (born 1963), Pakistani cricketer
- Mohsin Kamal (general) (1953–2020), Pakistani Army general
- Mohsin Akhtar Kayani (born 1970), Pakistani jurist
- Mohsin Al-Khaldi (born 1988), Omani footballer
- Mohsin Khan (Hong Kong cricketer) (born 1998), Hong Kong cricketer
- Mohsin Khan (Indian actor) (born 1991), Indian actor
- Mohsin Khan (Indian cricketer) (born 1998), Indian cricketer
- Mohsin Khan (Pakistani actor and cricketer) (born 1955), Pakistani cricket coach, player, and actor
- Mohsin Khan (writer), Indian novelist
- Mohsin Ali Khan, Bangladeshi diplomat and politician
- Mohsin Ayub Khan, Pakistani politician
- Mohsin Nazar Khan (1928–??), Pakistani hurdler
- Mohsin Atta Khan Khosa (born 1960), Pakistani politician
- Mohsin Latif (born 1971), Pakistani politician
- Mohsin Mighiana (born 1956), Pakistani physician, writer, columnist, and humorist
- Mohsin Mufti (born 1990), Indian cricketer
- Mohsin-ul-Mulk (1837–1907), Indian politician
- Mohsin Mulla (born 1981), Indian-Canadian cricketer
- Mohsin Nadeem (born 1994), Pakistani cricketer
- Mohsin Naqvi (1947–1996), Pakistani poet
- Mohsin Naqvi (poet) (1947−1996), Pakistani poet
- Mohsin Nawaz (born 1983), Pakistani long range shooter, sports psychologist, and nutritionist
- Mohsin Peramban (born 2002), Indian motorcycle racer
- Mohsin Qara'ati (born 1945), Iranian Shia cleric
- Mohsin Ali Qureshi (1948–2014), Pakistani politician
- Mohsin Muhammad Qureshi, Pakistani Army officer and physician
- Mohsin Shahnawaz Ranjha (born 1977), Pakistani politician
- Mohsin Raza (born 1968), Indian politician
- Mohsin Raza (composer) (born 1956), Pakistani television music director
- Mohsin Razi (born 1955), Pakistani diplomat
- Mohsin Fadzli Samsuri (1945–2022), Malaysian politician
- Mohsin Sayyed (born 1995), Indian cricketer
- Mohsin Shaikh (born 1987), Indian lyricist and composer
- Mohsin Siddiqui (died 1990), Pakistani politician and businessman
- Mohsin Wali (born 1953), Indian cardiologist
- Mohsin Zaidi (1935–2003), Indian poet
- Mohsin Zaidi (author) (born 1984/85), British author, keynote speaker, and management consultant

=== Mohsine ===
- Mohsine Loukili (born 1978), Moroccan novelist
- Mohsine Moutouali (born 1986), Moroccan footballer

=== Mouhsine ===
- Mouhsine Bodda (born 1997), Mauritanian footballer

=== Muhsen ===
- Muhsen Basma (born 1966), Syrian football referee
- Muhsen Bilal (born 1944), Syrian surgeon, diplomat, and politician
- Muhsen Al-Ghassani (born 1997), Omani footballer

=== Muhsin ===
- Muhsindzhon Abdugaffor (born 1997), Tajik footballer
- Muhsin Abu-Tabikh (1878–1961), Iraqi politician
- Muhsin ibn Ali (died 632), Arab descendent of the Islamic prophet Muhammad
- Muhsin Musa Matwalli Atwah (1964–2006), Egyptian terrorist
- Muhsin al-Barazi (1904–1949), Syrian lawyer, academic, and politician
- Muhsin Batur (1920–1999), Turkish military officer and politician
- Muhsin Ertuğral (born 1959), Turkish football coach
- Muhsin Ertuğrul (1892–1979), Turkish actor and director
- Muhsin al-Fadhli (1981–2015), Kuwaiti militant
- Muhsin al-Hakim (1889–1970), Iraqi ayatollah
- Muhsin Hakimzadeh (1882–1967), Azerbaijani Shia cleric
- Muhsin Hendricks (1967–2025), South African imam, Islamic scholar, and activist
- Muhsin ibn Husayn (1576–1629), Emir of Mecca and ruler of the Hejaz
- Muhsin Khidr al-Khafaji (1945–2017), Iraqi politician
- Muhsin Mahdi (1926–2007), Iraqi-American Islamic scholar and Arabist
- Muhsin Al-Mandalawi (born 1968), Iraqi businessman and politician
- Muhsin Muhammad (born 1973), American football player
- Muhsin Musabah (born 1964), Emirati footballer
- Muhsin Jassim Al-Musawi (born 1944), Iraqi scholar
- Muhsin Parari (born 1988), Indian film director, writer, producer, and lyricist
- Muhsin ibn Qaid (died 1055), ruler of the Hammadids
- Muhsin al-Qazwini (born 1952), Iraqi author, politician, essayist, and academic
- Muhsin al-Ramli (born 1967), Iraqi writer
- Muhsin Syihab (born 1970), Indonesian diplomat
- Muhsin Yaşar (born 1995), Turkish basketball player
- Muhsin Yazıcıoğlu (1954–2009), Turkish politician

=== Mukhsin ===
- Mukhsin Mukhamadiev (1966–2026), Tajik footballer player and manager

== Surname ==
=== Mohsen ===
- Marwan Mohsen (born 1989), Egyptian footballer
- Monti Mohsen (born 2000), Canadian footballer
- Salah Mohsen (born 1998), Egyptian footballer
- Zuheir Mohsen (1936–1979), Palestinian politician

=== Mohsin ===
- Hani Mohsin (1965–2006), Malaysian actor and television host
- Jugnu Mohsin (born 1959), Pakistani publisher and newspaper editor
- Moni Mohsin (born 1963), Pakistani-British writer
- Muhammad Mohsin (1732–1812), Indian philanthropist
- Saima Mohsin (born 1977), British journalist

=== Muhsen ===
- Ghassan Muhsen (born 1945), Iraqi painter
- Zana Muhsen (born 1965), British author

== See also ==
- Daulatpur Mohsin High School, high school in Daulatpur, Khulna District, Bangladesh
- Government Hazi Mohammad Mohshin College, government college in Chittagong, Bangladesh
- Hooghly Mohsin College, undergraduate college in Chinsurah, Bardhaman, in West Bengal, India
- Kotla Mohsin Khan, 16th century domed tombs and majestic gateway in the old city of Peshawar
- Abdulqadir Khan, Pakistani engineer and physicist known as 'Muhsin-i-Pakistan'
- Muhlis, list of people with a similar name
