= Moghaddam House and Museum =

Historic mansion and museum in Tehran

Coordinates: 35°41′13″N 51°24′17″E

Moghadam house is a museum and residence of the Qajar family
UNESCO World Heritage Site
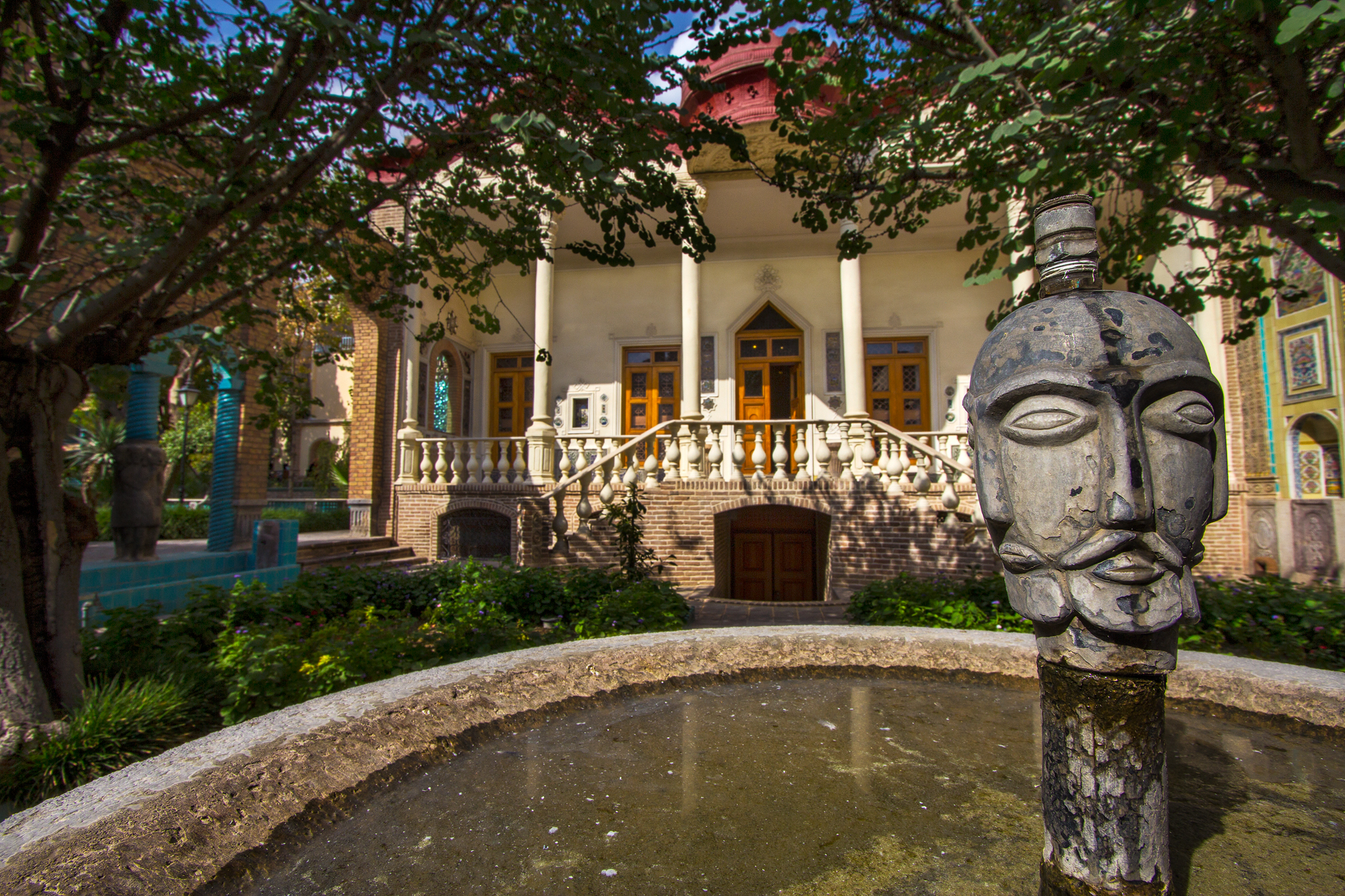
- Moghadam House and Museum
- Interactive map of Moghadam house is a museum and residence of the Qajar family
- Official name: Moghadam House and Museum
- Location: University of Tehran, Tehran
- Criteria: historic heritage
- Reference: 2929
- Website: http://museums.ut.ac.ir/mm/default-18.htm

Moghaddam House (Persian: خانه مقدم) or Moghaddam Museum House of the University of Tehran is a Qajar era mansion in Tehran which is now a museum of historic objects. Originally a large and luxurious mansion, it was the residence of the family of Mohammad Taghi Khan Ehtesab al-Molk, a famous official of the Qajar court and the head of the time accounting office (municipality) of Tehran and the sovereign minister of Iran in Bern, Switzerland.

It was later owned by his son, Mohsen Moghaddam, a professor of archeology at the University of Tehran. He and his wife, Selma Kuyumjian, lived in their father's house in Tehran. Mohsen Moghaddam and Selma, who was born in Bulgaria and is the director of the Library of the National Museum of Iran, in addition to scientific activities, collected many works and objects with the aim of preserving the cultural and historical heritage of Iran.

Mohsen Moghaddam has installed many valuable collected works such as tiles, carved stone pieces, etc., inspired by the traditional-historical spaces, in a significant way in this old building. He has also gathered some other pieces such as the collection of fabric, Chibouk, smoke pot, hookah, pottery. He has kept glass works, paintings, mosaics, coins, historical documents, etc. in a special order in his parental house.

== Architecture ==
The space with an area of 2117 square meters includes three outer, inner and caretaker courtyards.

== Outer courtyard ==
=== Hosekhane ===
This basement was built in the Mozaffari period (1324–1313 AH) at the same time as the house was built by Mohammad Taqi Khan Ekhbal al-Molk, Mohsen Moghaddam's father. The "Hozkhaneh" is decorated with tiles and fragments of terracotta vessels taken from exquisite works belonging to the 4th to 13th centuries A.H., which show the evolution of Iran's pottery and tile industry.

== Gallery ==
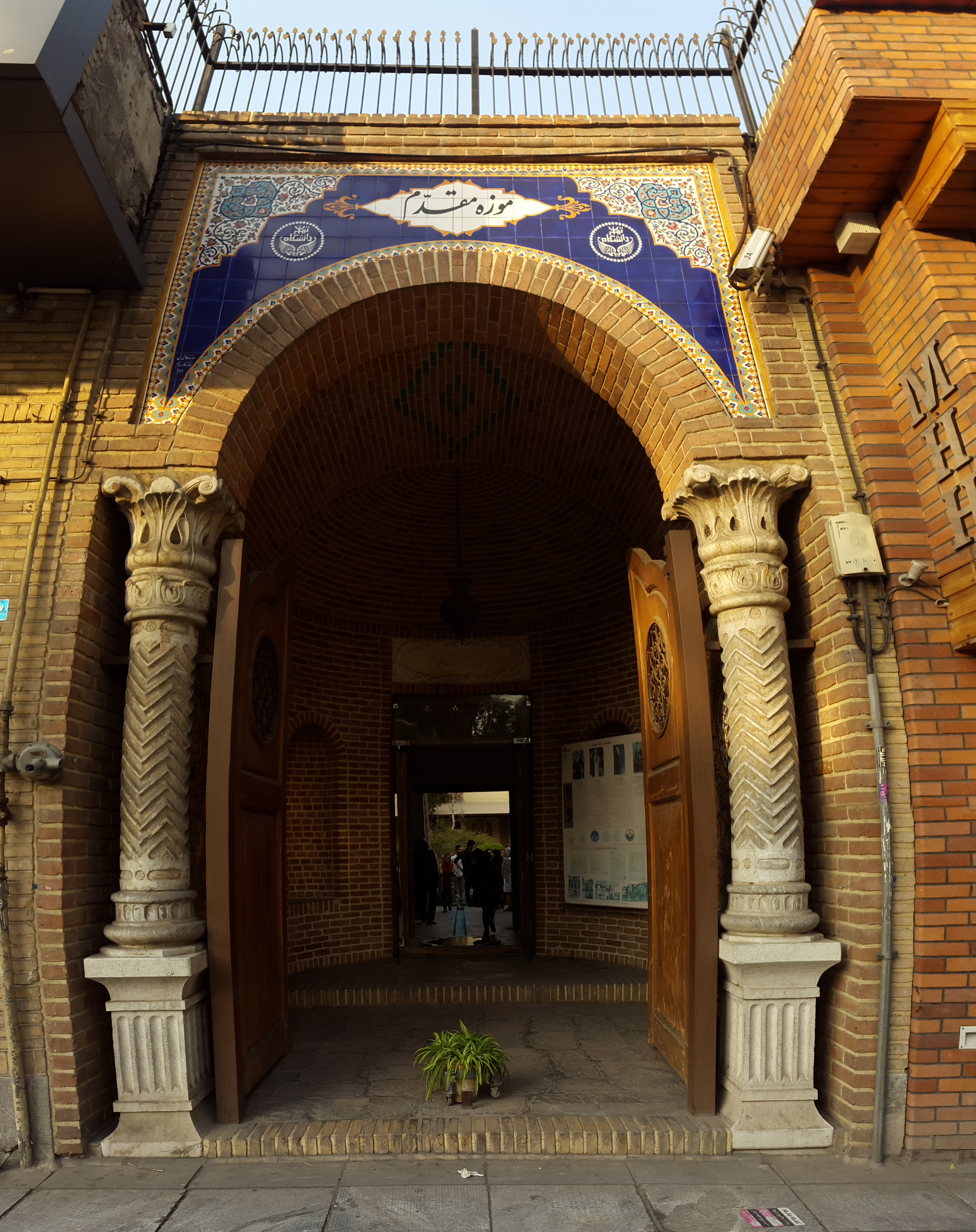
Museum entrance

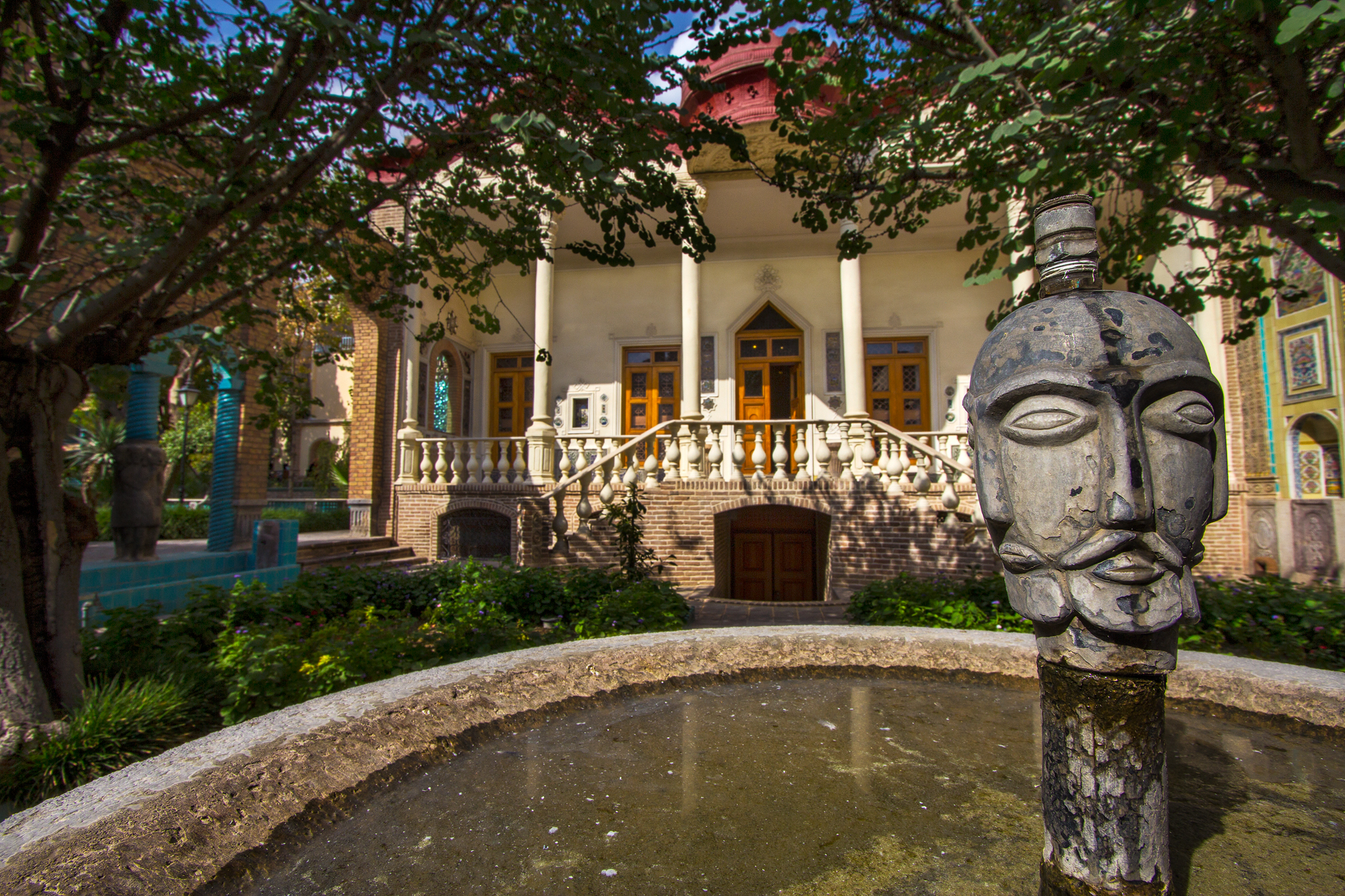
Moghadam House

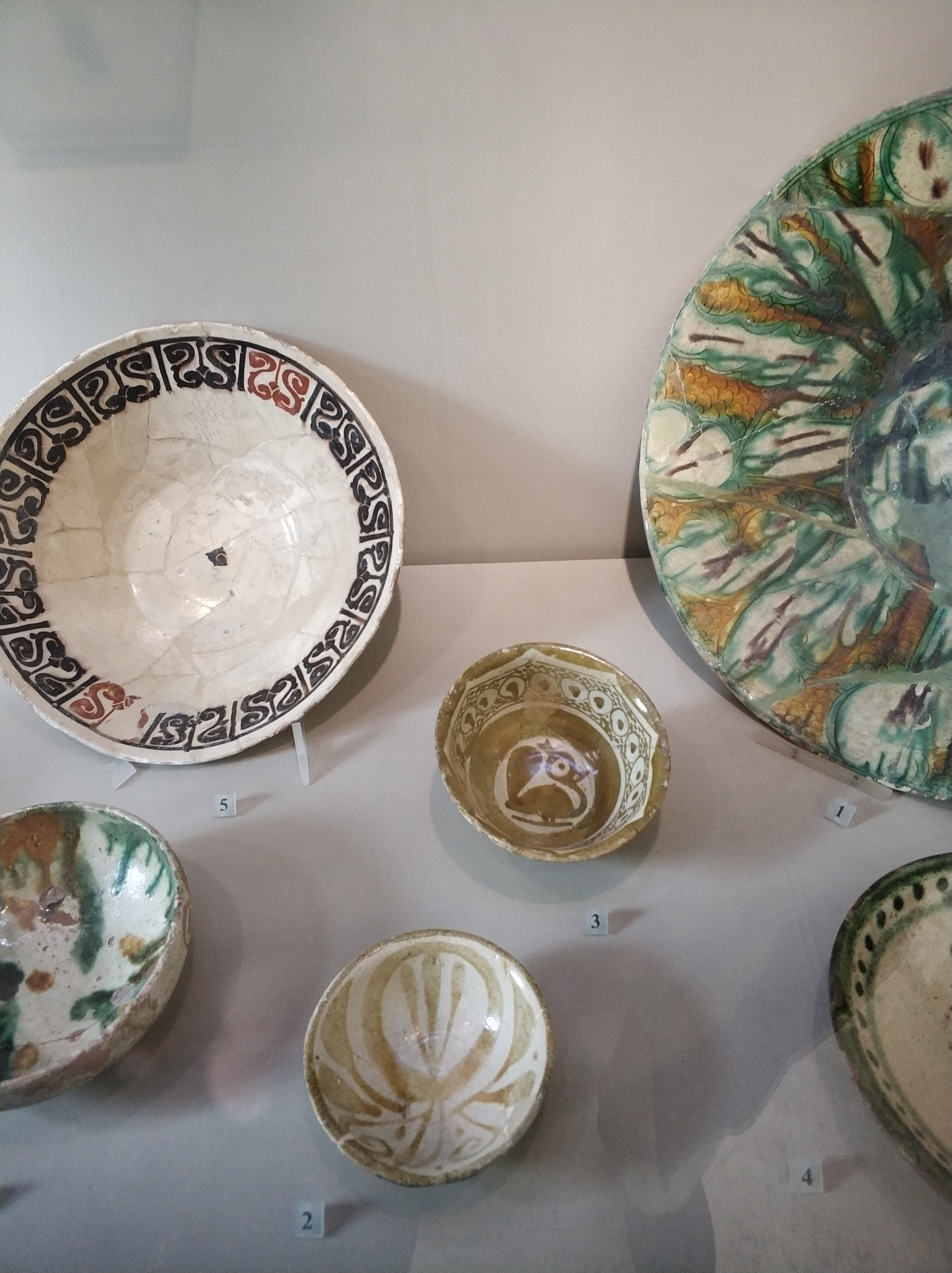
Museum

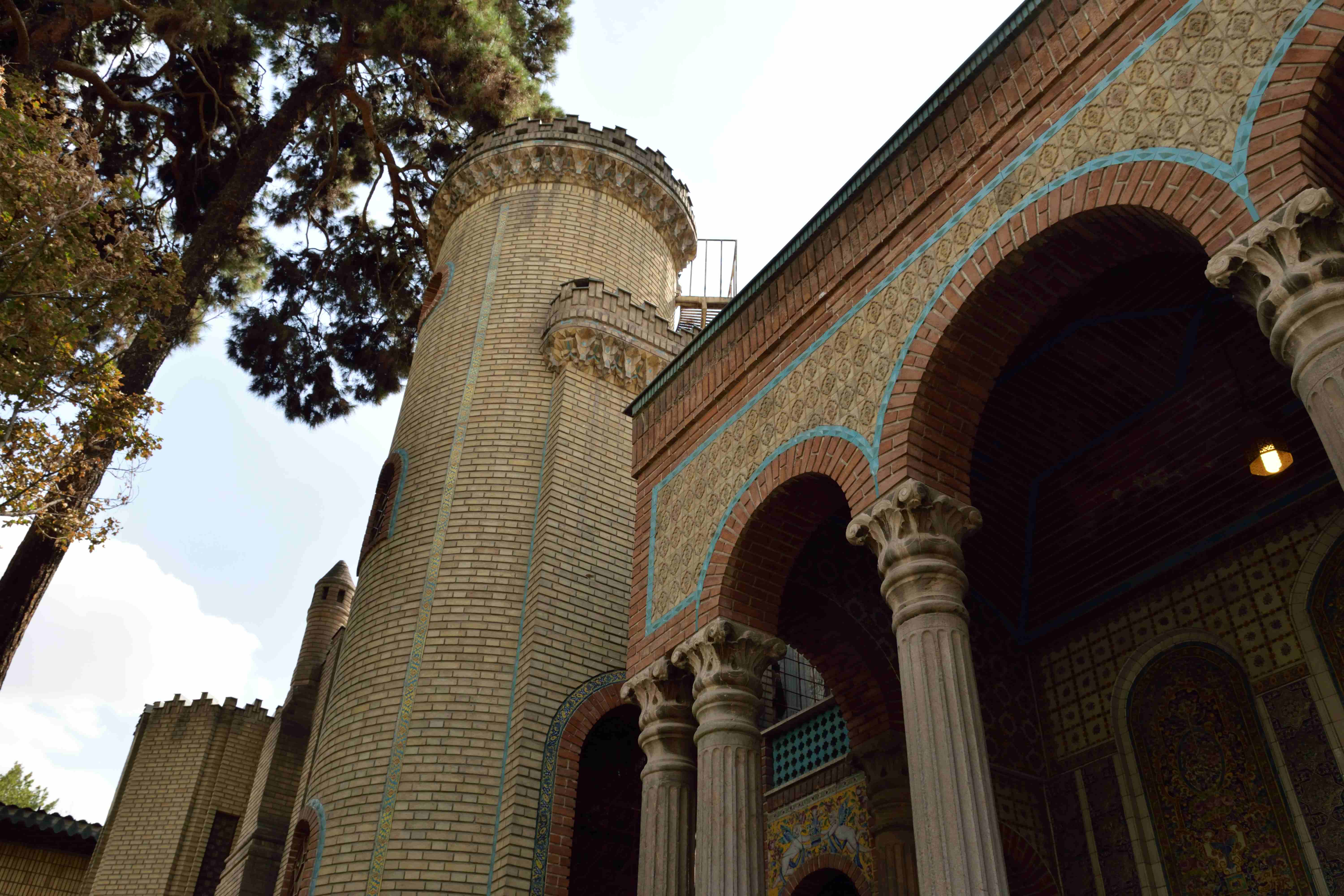
Moghadam House and Museum

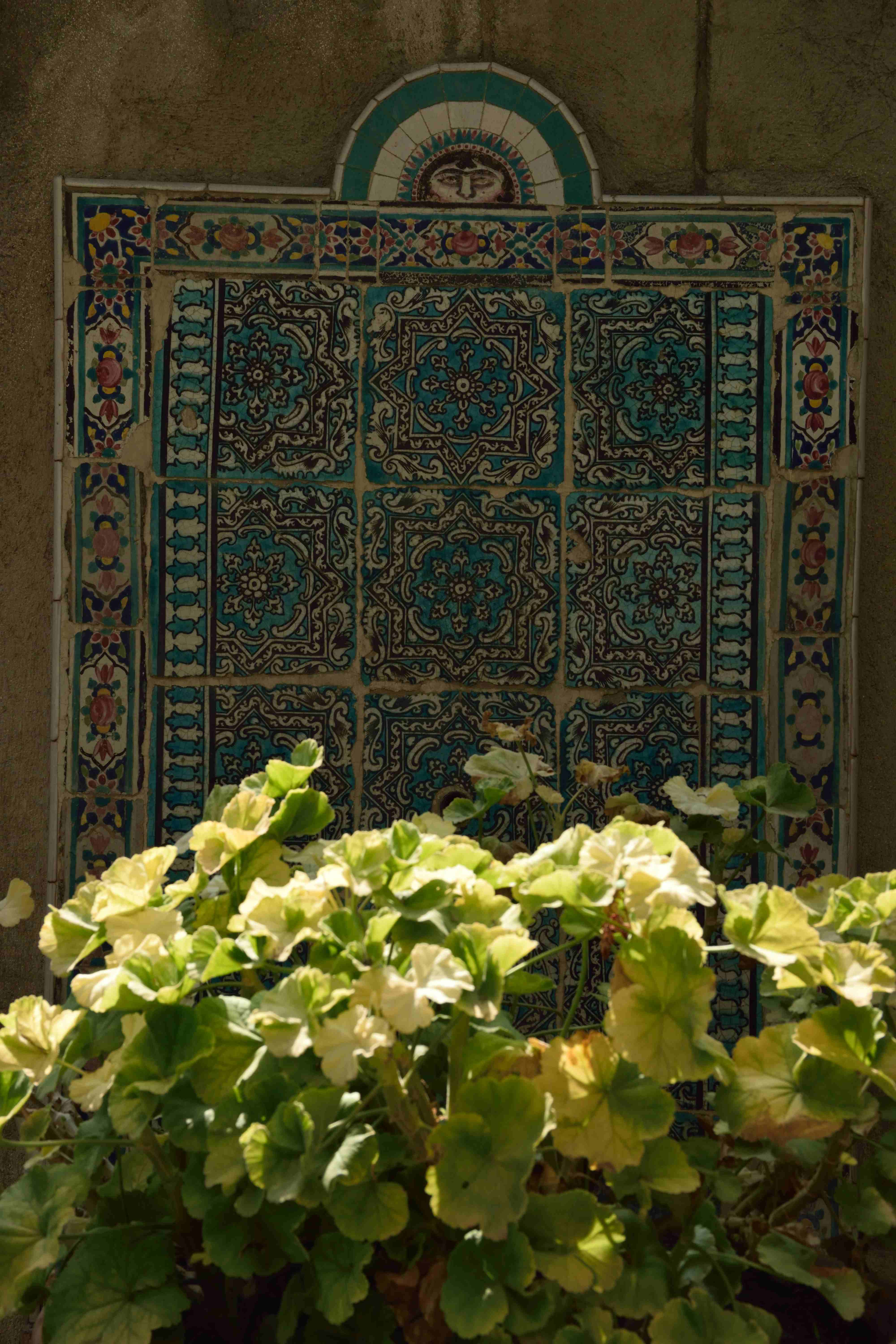
House

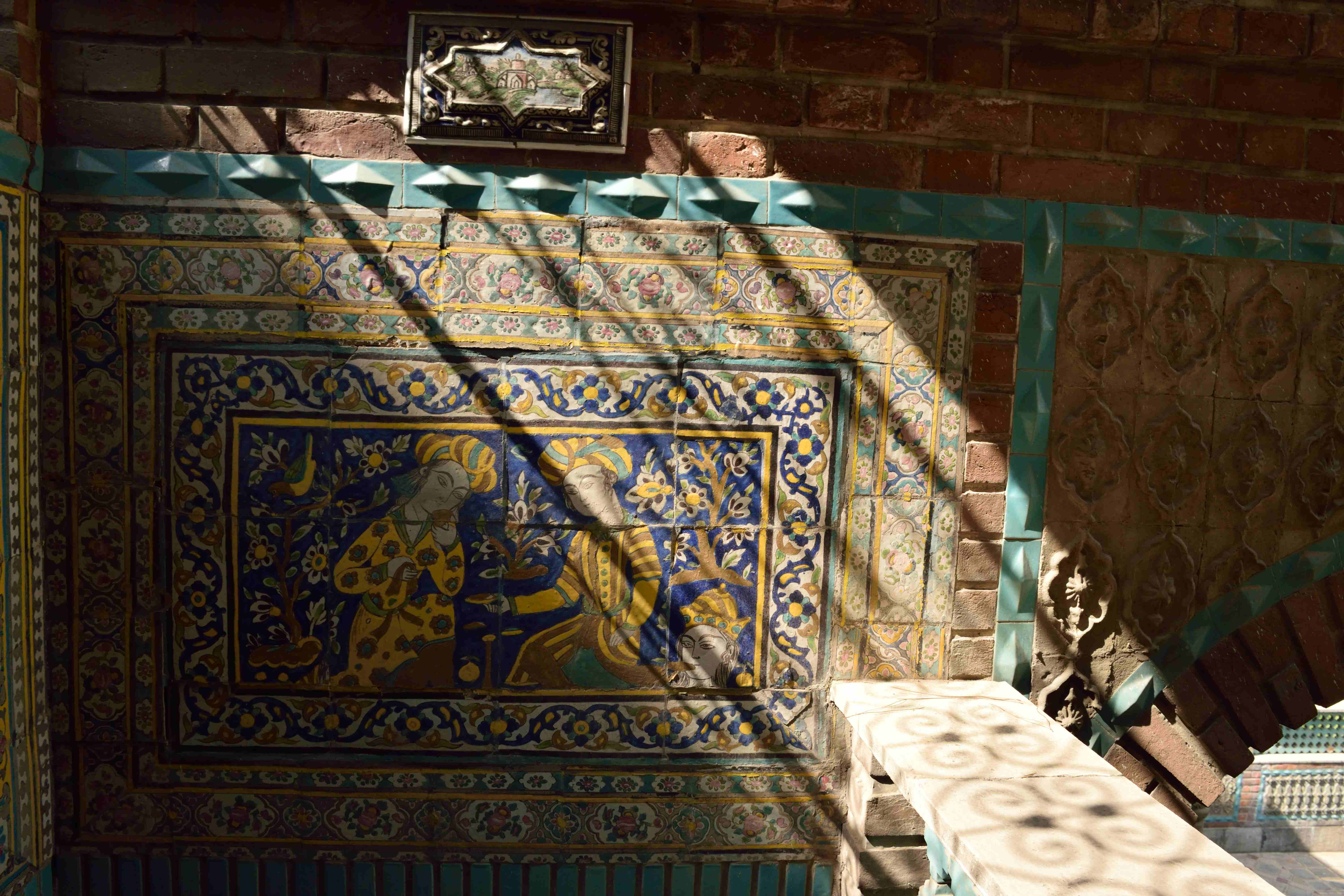
House

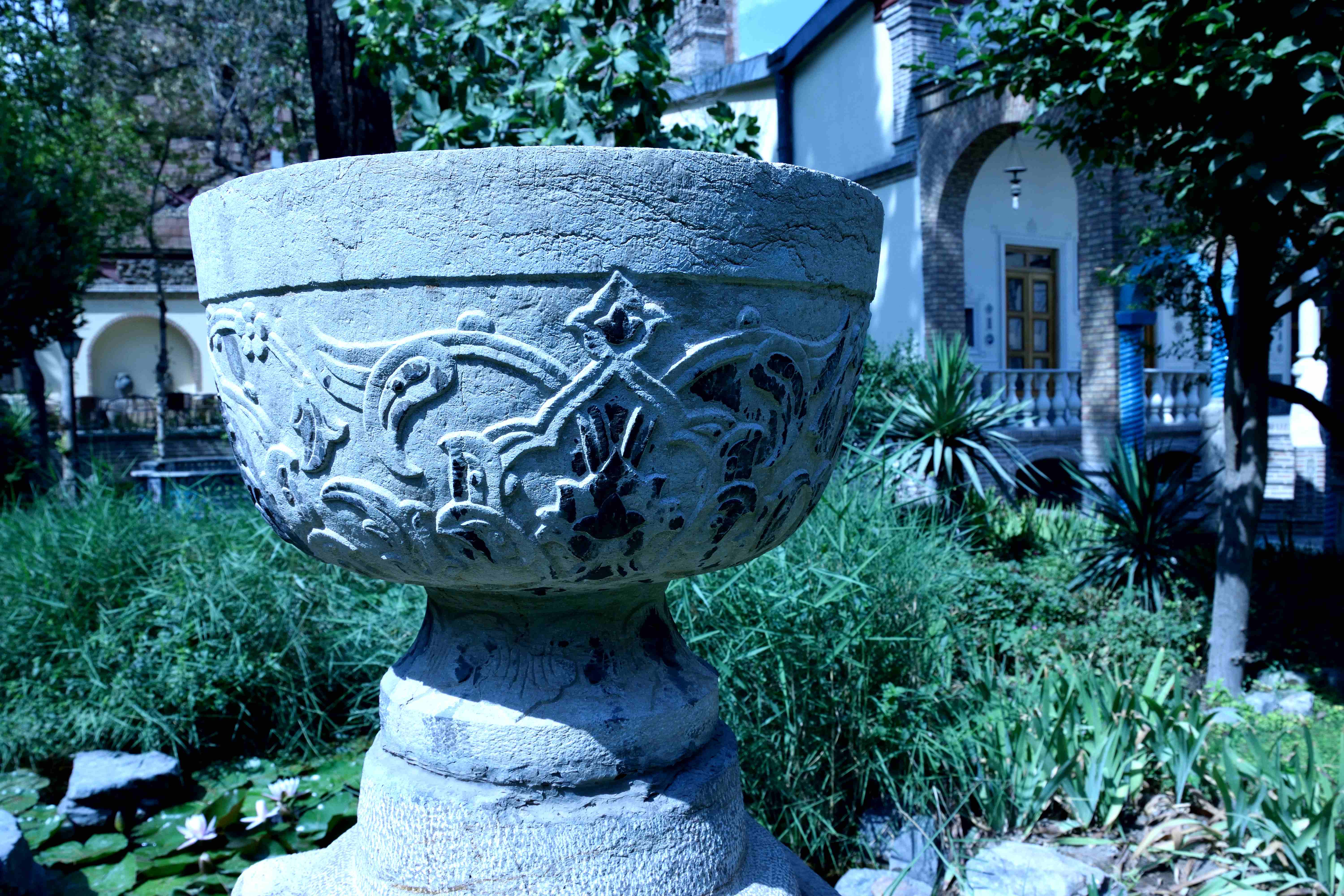
House

== See also ==
- Hooshang Seyhoun
- University of Tehran
- List of museums in Tehran
- List of museums in Iran
