= Muhlis =

Muhlis is a masculine given name used in Turkey. In Turkish it refers to those who are sincere in their friendship and beliefs. The word is of Arabic origin with the meaning of sincere and pure. It is also used as a surname in Turkey.

Notable people with the name include:

- Muhlis Akarsu (1948–1993), Turkish musical artist
- Muhlis Erkmen (1891–1985), Turkish farmer and politician
- Muhlis Suner (1887–1969), Turkish politician
- Muhlis Tayfur (1922–2008), Turkish wrestler
