= Hasan Moqaddam =

Iranian playwright, writer and diplomat (c. 1895–1925)

- حسن مقدم
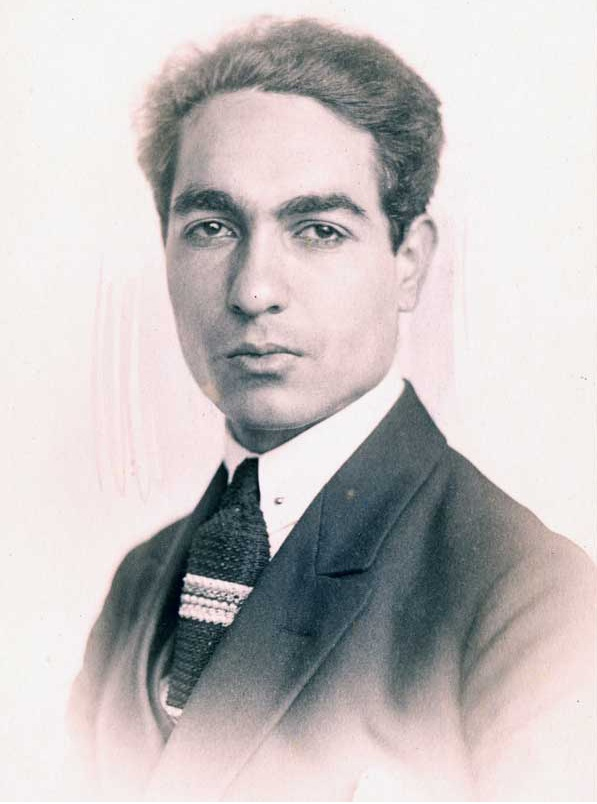
- Born: c. 1895–1898; Tehran, Qajar Iran
- Died: 1925; Leysin, Switzerland
- Occupations: Playwright, writer, journalist, diplomat
- Relatives: Mohsen Moghaddam (brother)
- Writing career
- Language: Persian, French
- Notable work: Ja'far Khan az Farang Amadeh

Hasan Moqaddam (Persian: حسن مقدم; c. 1895–1898 – 1925), also spelled Hassan Moghaddam, was an Iranian playwright, short-story writer, journalist, theatre critic and diplomat. He is best known for the one-act comedy Ja'far Khan az Farang Amadeh (Ja'far Khan Returns from Europe, 1922), a satire of both superficial Westernisation and social traditionalism in early twentieth-century Iran.

Moqaddam's play is regarded as an important work in the emergence of modern Persian drama. Theatre historian Farrokh Ghaffary described him as a gifted early modern playwright, while later scholarship has repeatedly examined Ja'far Khan in discussions of modernity, cultural identity and the encounter between Iran and Europe.

== Name and dates ==
Moqaddam's name appears in English-language publications in several forms, including Hasan Moqaddam, Hassan Moghaddam and Hasan Moghaddam.

Sources also disagree on his exact year of birth. Published accounts give dates ranging from 1895 to 1898. Iranian sources generally place his birth in Tehran in the late 1890s. He died in Switzerland in 1925.

== Early life and education ==
Moqaddam was born in Tehran into the family of Mohammad-Taqi Khan Ehtesab al-Molk, a Qajar official. His younger brother, Mohsen Moghaddam, later became an archaeologist and professor at the University of Tehran.

He initially attended the Tarbiat School in Tehran. When his father was appointed to a diplomatic post in Switzerland, Moqaddam accompanied him to Europe and continued his education in Lausanne. Iranian biographical sources state that he studied literature and social sciences there.

His long residence in Europe gave him a familiarity with European languages, literature and social life that later became central to both his writing and his critique of Iranian encounters with modernity.

== Writing and journalism ==
Moqaddam wrote in both Persian and French. His early literary work included short stories and humorous prose. One of his first published stories, Hendavaneh (Watermelon), appeared in Istanbul in the late 1910s. Other stories attributed to him include Narges, The Wife of Haji Aqa and Princess Taji.

He contributed to Persian-language periodicals and wrote literary and theatrical criticism. Research on early Iranian theatre has identified some contemporary reviews published under initials or pseudonyms as writings by Moqaddam himself.

Moqaddam also used the pen name Ali Nowruz (Persian: علی نوروز).

== Iran-e Javan ==
After returning to Iran, Moqaddam became involved with a circle of young, European-educated intellectuals who founded an association initially called Sorush-e Danesh. It was subsequently renamed Iran-e Javan (Young Iran). Members associated with the circle included Ali-Akbar Siassi, Morteza Moshfeq Kazemi, Ali Soheili and Abdolhossein Meykadeh.

The association advocated cultural and social reform and sought to adopt aspects of European modernity while avoiding what its members regarded as superficial imitation. A scholarly study of the group has linked its reformist programme directly to the themes of Moqaddam's best-known play.

== Ja'far Khan az Farang Amadeh ==
Moqaddam wrote the one-act comedy Ja'far Khan az Farang Amadeh (Persian: جعفرخان از فرنگ آمده) around 1921–1922. It was first performed in Tehran at the Grand Hotel and constituted the first major theatrical activity of the Iran-e Javan association.

Moqaddam himself participated in the performance.

The play centres on Ja'far Khan, a young Iranian who returns home after studying in Europe. He arrives dressed in the latest European fashion, mixes French expressions into his Persian and brings with him new habits that clash with those of his conservative family. Rather than presenting either side as entirely admirable, Moqaddam satirises both Ja'far Khan's shallow imitation of European manners and the superstition, rigidity and social conventions of his family.

The resulting conflict has frequently been interpreted as an early literary representation of the tensions surrounding Westernisation and modernity in Iran. Mehrzad Boroujerdi has described the play as a particularly effective representation of the conflict between imported European values and local Iranian social norms.

Contemporary reception of the play was unusually extensive. Reviews appeared in Tehran newspapers, and the expression “Ja'far Khan has returned from Europe” entered popular usage as a description of an Iranian who had adopted European manners superficially.

The Centre for the Great Islamic Encyclopedia describes the play as having had an unusually strong impact in the years following the Persian Constitutional Revolution, both for its subject matter and for its theatrical presentation.

== Irani Bazi ==
Moqaddam's other major dramatic work was Irani Bazi (Persian: ایرانی بازی), published in 1924 under the name Ali Nowruz. The four-act satire again employed a character named Ja'far Khan but transferred him to an imagined future Iran at the end of the twentieth century.

The play focuses particularly on bureaucracy, government administration and the difficulties faced by an educated individual attempting to function within dysfunctional institutions. Its comic devices include animated objects and deliberately exaggerated theatrical effects, which scholars have identified as experiments in the development of modern Iranian stage writing.

== Diplomatic career ==
Alongside his literary activities, Moqaddam worked in the Iranian diplomatic service. Biographical studies describe him as a diplomat as well as a writer, journalist and theatre critic.

His diplomatic and journalistic travels through Europe and the Middle East provided material for articles on political and social conditions outside Iran.

== Death ==
Moqaddam developed tuberculosis and was eventually treated at a sanatorium in Leysin, Switzerland. He died there in 1925 while still in his twenties.

His early death limited his literary output, but Ja'far Khan az Farang Amadeh continued to be performed, republished and studied throughout the twentieth and twenty-first centuries.

== Legacy ==
Scholars of Iranian theatre have placed Moqaddam among the important playwrights of the formative period of modern Persian drama. The Great Islamic Encyclopedia describes him as the most important playwright of the beginning of the fourteenth century in the Solar Hijri calendar.

His work remains particularly significant for its treatment of the cultural encounter between Iran and Europe. Later literary and cultural studies have repeatedly returned to Ja'far Khan as an early representation of the farangi-ma'ab, the superficially Europeanised Iranian.

An English-language scholarly study at the University of Texas has argued that the 1922 staging of Ja'far Khan Returns from the West contributed significantly to the development of the modern theatre movement in Iran.

== Selected works ==
- Hendavaneh (Watermelon), short story
- Narges, short story
- Zan-e Haji Aqa (The Wife of Haji Aqa), short story
- Shahzadeh Khanom Taji (Princess Taji), short story
- Ja'far Khan az Farang Amadeh (Ja'far Khan Returns from Europe), 1922
- Irani Bazi, 1924

== See also ==
- Persian theatre
- Persian literature
- Mohsen Moghaddam
