= Selma Kuyumjian =

Armenian archaeologist and librarian in Iran (1907–1990)

- Սալմա Գույումճյան (Armenian); سلما کویومجیان (Persian)
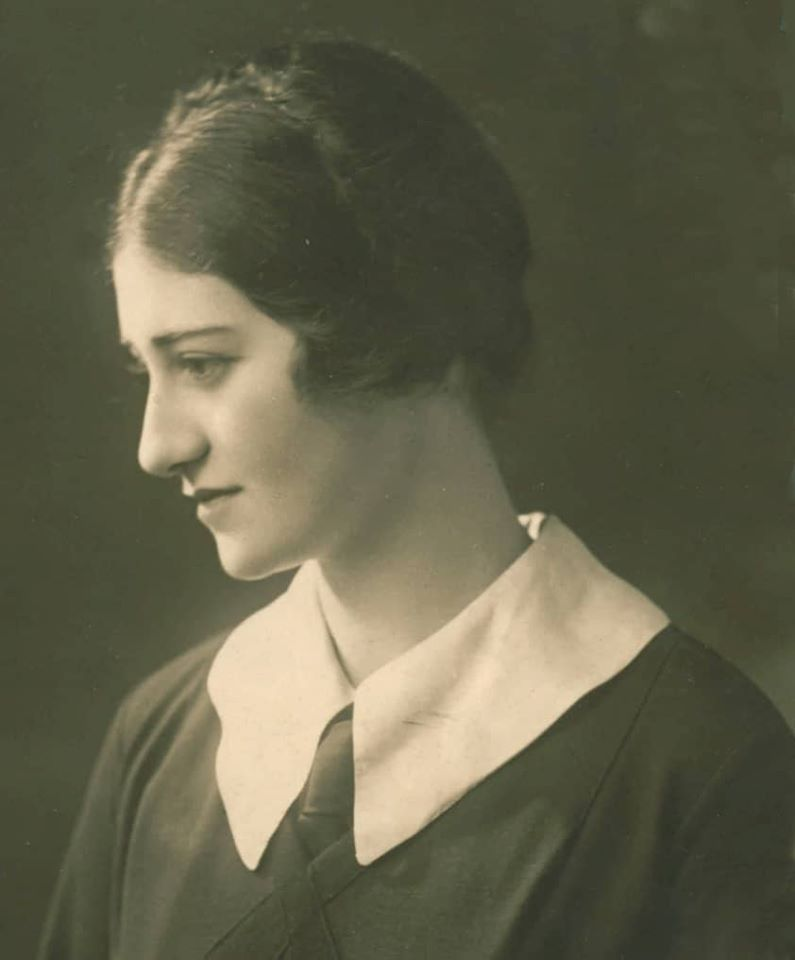
- Born: December 26, 1907; Ruse, Bulgaria
- Died: 1990 (aged 82–83); Tehran, Iran
- Education: École du Louvre
- Known for: Archaeological work in Iran; head of the library of the National Museum of Iran; co-formation of the collection of the Moghadam House and Museum
- Spouse: Mohsen Moghaddam
- Scientific career
- Fields: Archaeology, museum studies
- Institutions: National Museum of Iran; Iranian Archaeological Service

Selma Kuyumjian (Persian: سلما کویومجیان, Armenian: Սալմա Գույումճյան; 26 December 1907 – 1990), also known as Selma Kouyoumjian and, after her marriage, Selma Moghaddam, was a Bulgarian-born Armenian archaeologist and librarian who lived and worked in Iran from 1936 until her death. She served as head of the library of the National Museum of Iran and undertook archaeological assignments for Iran's antiquities administration.

Together with her husband, Iranian archaeologist and professor Mohsen Moghaddam, Kuyumjian assembled and preserved a collection of Iranian archaeological objects, architectural fragments and works of decorative art in their Tehran residence. The house and collection later became the Moghadam House and Museum of the University of Tehran.

== Early life and education ==
Kuyumjian was born on 26 December 1907 in Ruse (then commonly known as Ruschuk), Bulgaria, to an Armenian family. Her parents, Vagharshak and Arsine Kuyumjian, were Armenians whose family origins were in the region of Kars, then part of the Ottoman Empire.

She spent much of her childhood and youth in Western Europe, living for periods in Switzerland, England and France. She received training in several fields and obtained a qualification in archaeology from the École du Louvre in Paris. She also studied at the school of decorative arts and at archaeological institutions in Paris and received a diploma for teaching English in Switzerland.

Her archaeological interests included Sasanian Iran and the archaeology of India and East Asia.

While in France she worked for several years as one of the secretaries of an association devoted to the study of Iran and Iranian art. Through this circle she met Mohsen Moghaddam, an Iranian painter and archaeologist then studying and working in France. They married on 29 June 1936 and moved to Iran the same year.

== Archaeological and museum career ==
After settling in Iran, Kuyumjian and Moghaddam entered the service of the Ministry of Education and were assigned to inspect archaeological monuments and sites. Both worked as technical inspectors for the Iranian antiquities administration in connection with the French archaeological excavations at Susa.

Moghaddam later recalled that Kuyumjian received the same technical-inspector appointment as he did, although at a lower salary, and identified her as the first woman appointed to that position in Iran.

Kuyumjian subsequently became head of the library of the Archaeological Museum of Iran, now the National Museum of Iran. The University of Tehran has also described her as an archaeologist and former head of the museum library.

Alongside her library responsibilities, she continued to undertake archaeological and museum-related assignments. In 1961 she participated in work connected with the international exhibition 7000 Years of Iranian Art in Paris and represented Iran at an international meeting of museum professionals in Tokyo. The Paris exhibition, held at the Petit Palais in 1961–1962, was one of the major international surveys of Iranian art of the period.

Kuyumjian retired from Iran's Ministry of Culture and Art in 1966. After her retirement she worked at the library of the museum of the Iranian Parliament.

== Guide de Suse et de Tchogha-Zanbil ==
Kuyumjian published an archaeological guide to two of Iran's major ancient sites under her married name, Selma Moghaddam. Guide de Suse et de Tchogha-Zanbil was issued in Tehran by the Iranian Archaeological Service in 1963. The volume was published in French and Persian, with the Persian translation by Noushin Nafisi.

The book provides an introduction to the archaeological history and monuments of Susa and Chogha Zanbil, including the results of the excavations that had revealed the importance of the two sites for the study of ancient Elam.

== Moghaddam House and collection ==
After arriving in Tehran in 1936, Kuyumjian and Moghaddam lived in Moghaddam's family home, a Qajar-period mansion inherited from his father, Mohammad-Taqi Khan Ehtesab al-Molk.

Over the following decades the couple assembled a large collection of objects connected with Iranian history and material culture. The collection included tiles and other architectural fragments, carved stone, ceramics, glass, textiles, seals, coins, paintings and historical documents.

Many architectural fragments were incorporated directly into the house and its gardens rather than being treated simply as detached museum objects. The resulting arrangement combined the couple's residence, archaeological collection and their interest in historical Iranian architecture.

In 1972 Moghaddam formally endowed the house and its collections to the University of Tehran so that they could be used for teaching and research in archaeology, art and related fields. Following Moghaddam's death in 1987, Kuyumjian continued to live in the house until her own death in 1990. The property then passed fully into the custody of the University of Tehran and was eventually opened to the public as the Moghaddam House Museum.

== Recognition ==
At a memorial held for Kuyumjian at the Moghaddam House Museum in 2021, researcher Grigor Ghazarian stated that she had been awarded the French Legion of Honour by Charles de Gaulle for her cultural activities.

The University of Tehran has subsequently held programmes and exhibitions devoted to Kuyumjian's life and her contribution to the preservation of Iranian cultural heritage.

== Death and legacy ==
Kuyumjian died in Tehran in 1990, four years after her husband. She was buried in the Armenian cemetery in Tehran.

Her professional career and her work with Moghaddam have been revisited in later publications and documentary projects. In 2021, Peyman Cultural Quarterly published a biographical study of her and the Moghaddam House Museum. The University of Tehran organized a formal commemoration of her in December of the same year.

A documentary titled Sedā-ye Selma (The Voice of Selma), directed by Roya Iravani, has also been produced about her life.

== Selected publication ==
- Moghaddam, Selma (1963). Guide de Suse et de Tchogha-Zanbil. Persian translation by Noushin Nafisi. Tehran: Service Archéologique de l'Iran. French and Persian.

== See also ==
- Mohsen Moghaddam
- Moghadam House and Museum
- National Museum of Iran
- Susa
- Chogha Zanbil
