= Mohsen Moghaddam =

Iranian archaeologist, art historian and professor (1900–1987)

- محسن مقدم
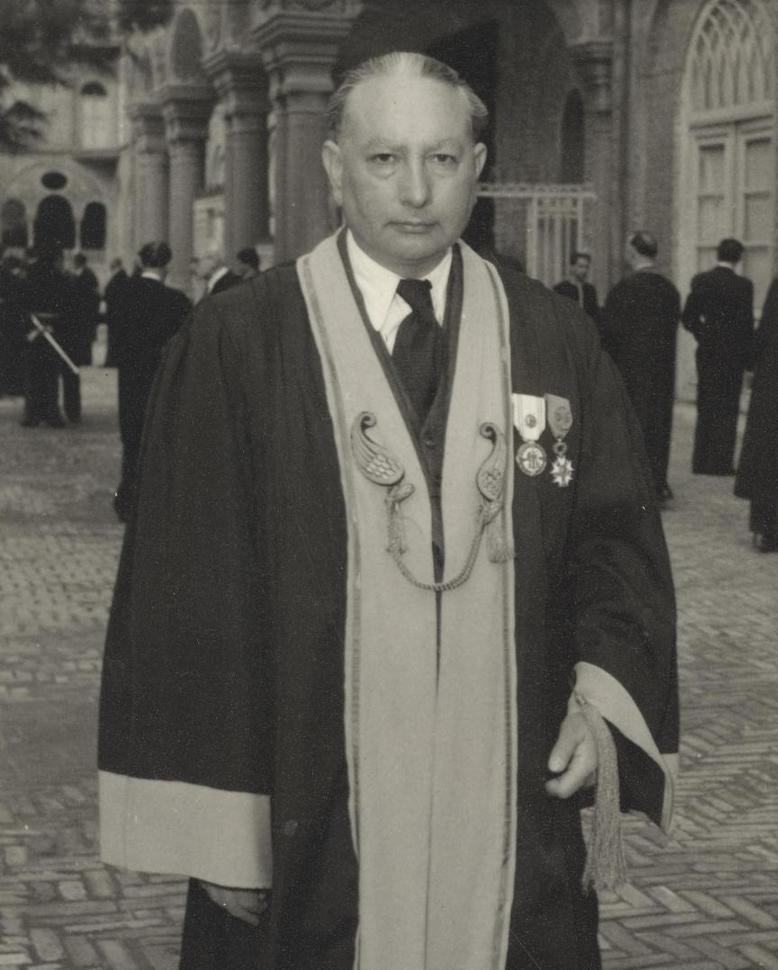
- Born: 2 December 1900; Tehran, Qajar Iran
- Died: 10 November 1987 (aged 86); Tehran, Iran
- Known for: Archaeological research; co-founding the Faculty of Fine Arts at the University of Tehran; design of the University of Tehran emblem; Moghadam House and Museum
- Spouse: Selma Kuyumjian
- Relatives: Hasan Moqaddam (brother)

Academic work
- Institutions: University of Tehran

Mohsen Moghaddam (Persian: محسن مقدم; 2 December 1900 – 10 November 1987) was an Iranian archaeologist, art historian, painter, professor and art collector. He was among the figures involved in the establishment of the Faculty of Fine Arts at the University of Tehran and became one of the university's early professors of archaeology and art history.

Moghaddam also designed the emblem of the University of Tehran, basing it on a Sasanian stucco motif from Ctesiphon. Together with his wife, Selma Kuyumjian, he assembled a substantial collection of Iranian art and archaeological material in his family home in Tehran. In 1972 he endowed the house and its collections to the University of Tehran for use by students and researchers; it later became the Moghadam House and Museum.

== Early life and education ==
Moghaddam was born in Tehran in 1900, the son of Mohammad-Taqi Khan Ehtesab al-Molk, a Qajar official. His elder brother was the playwright and writer Hasan Moqaddam.

He was sent to Europe for his education in 1912. During the First World War he returned to Iran and studied painting at the School of Fine Arts established by Kamal-ol-molk. He later returned to Europe and studied archaeology in Paris, attending courses at the archaeological department of the Louvre under French archaeologist Georges Contenau. He also continued his training in painting while in Paris.

In 1936 Moghaddam married Selma Kuyumjian, who had also studied archaeology and art. The couple returned to Iran that year and settled in Moghaddam's family home in central Tehran.

== Archaeology ==
Moghaddam began working professionally in Iranian archaeology in the late 1930s. In 1937 he served as technical inspector for the French archaeological mission at Susa, then directed by Roland de Mecquenem. He and Kuyumjian subsequently worked in connection with the Ancient Iran Museum, now the National Museum of Iran, during the period in which André Godard played a leading role in Iranian archaeological administration.

Moghaddam participated in archaeological research at sites including Susa and in northern Iran. His work was particularly associated with surveys and excavations in Gilan. In the early 1960s he directed excavations at Ghiasabad as part of wider research into the archaeological landscape south of the Caspian Sea.

His archaeological work formed part of a period in which Iranian scholars increasingly assumed responsibility for field research that had previously been dominated by foreign archaeological missions.

Moghaddam was also involved in debates over the preservation and authentication of Iranian antiquities. Archival research published in Iranian Studies records his criticism of André Godard's acquisition of bronze objects for the Ancient Iran Museum, some of which Moghaddam regarded as forgeries.

== University of Tehran ==
Moghaddam was among the artists, architects and scholars invited to participate in discussions surrounding the establishment of the University of Tehran's art school in 1940. The institution later became the Faculty of Fine Arts.

He subsequently taught archaeology and art history at the university and attained the rank of professor. When the Archaeological Institute of the University of Tehran was formally established in 1959, Moghaddam was appointed to its governing council alongside scholars including Ezzatollah Negahban, Isa Behnam and Ebrahim Pourdavoud.

Several members of the next generation of Iranian archaeologists, including Negahban, worked within the academic environment in which Moghaddam taught and carried out research.

== University of Tehran emblem ==
Moghaddam designed the emblem of the University of Tehran. According to the university, the design was adapted from a Sasanian stucco relief from Ctesiphon consisting of two stylised wings surrounding a central element. Moghaddam adapted the motif and incorporated lettering inspired by Sasanian Pahlavi script.

The emblem has remained the principal institutional symbol of the University of Tehran despite later modifications and graphic adaptations.

== Collection and Moghaddam House ==
Moghaddam and Kuyumjian collected archaeological objects, architectural fragments and works of Iranian decorative art over several decades. Their collection included tiles, carved stone fragments, ceramics, glass, textiles, seals, coins, paintings, historical documents and objects associated with everyday life.

Rather than keeping all of the material in cabinets, Moghaddam incorporated architectural fragments, tiles and stonework into the fabric and gardens of the house, creating historical and architectural settings in which objects from different periods of Iranian art were displayed.

His collection has subsequently been cited in scholarship on Iranian architectural decoration. A 2024 study published by the Getty Research Institute referred to medieval tiles preserved in the Moghaddam Museum and to Moghaddam's own published description of the house and its collections.

In October 1972, Moghaddam formally endowed the property and its contents to the University of Tehran. The endowment stipulated that the house should serve students of the faculty of fine arts, the university's Archaeological Institute and other researchers. After the deaths of Moghaddam and Kuyumjian, the university assumed direct responsibility for the property, which was eventually opened to the public as the Moghaddam House Museum.

== Painting ==
Although best known for archaeology and teaching, Moghaddam was also trained as a painter and remained active in the visual arts. His early artistic education included study under Kamal-ol-molk in Tehran and further training in Paris.

His paintings have been discussed in studies of the development of modern art in Iran and of the generation of Iranian artists active during the first half of the twentieth century.

== Honours ==
Moghaddam was appointed an Officer of the French Legion of Honour. Iranian sources associate the distinction with his cultural and scholarly activities and his contribution to relations between Iran and France.

== Selected publication ==
- Moghaddam, Mohsen (1967). “An Old House in Tehran: Its Gardens, Its Collections.” In Arthur Upham Pope and Phyllis Ackerman (eds.), A Survey of Persian Art from Prehistoric Times to the Present, vol. 14.

== Legacy ==
Moghaddam's legacy combines archaeology, art-historical teaching, collecting and institutional development. The house and collection he and Kuyumjian assembled remain part of the University of Tehran and serve as a museum and research resource.

His role in the early development of the Faculty of Fine Arts and Archaeological Institute also places him among the generation that contributed to the institutionalisation of archaeology and art history within Iranian universities.

== See also ==
- Moghadam House and Museum
- Ezzatollah Negahban
- André Godard
- National Museum of Iran
