= Mohsen Nabavi =

Iranian director, scriptwriter and actor

- محسن نبوی
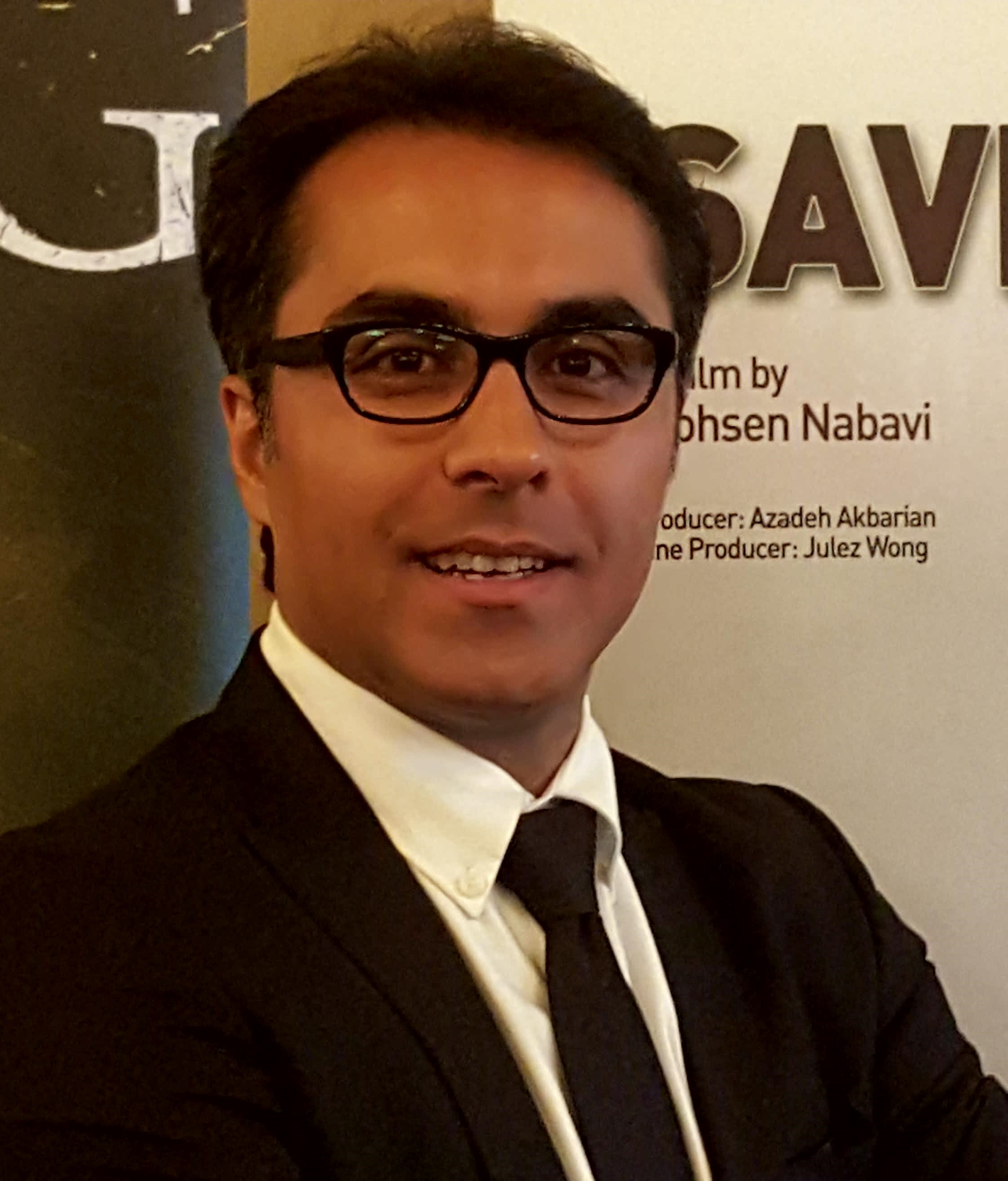
- Mohsen Nabavi at the Global Short Film Awards festival in Cannes, France 2019 (Best Short Film and Best Drama Film)
- Born: 2 August 1979 (age 47); Shiraz, Iran
- Education: MA in Dramatic Literature
- Occupations: Film director, scriptwriter, actor
- Years active: 2006–present

Mohsen Nabavi (Persian: محسن نبوی; born 2 August 1979 in Shiraz) is an Iranian-Canadian director, scriptwriter, and actor.

He started his work by making short narrative film entitled "These Days" for Iranian Young Cinema Society (IYCS). He has also written for several movie newspapers and magazines like 'Banifilm' and 'Shortfilmnews'. He has won numerous awards from national and international film festivals for short film "Save me", such as "Best Drama" at 'Global Short Film Awards', Kuala Lumpur, Savigliano, Greenmotion.

== Movies ==
=== Short narrative films ===
- These Days (2005)
- Aquarium (2008)
- The Last Sounds of Earth (2010)
- Being Butterfly (2014)
- Save Me! (Amidst the Trees) (2016)
- Jumping (2021)
- PHOENIX (2022)
- Un-Decided (2025)
- The Last Wave (2026)

=== Writer ===
- The Day Mina Disappeared (2011)
- Time Travel (2012)
- A Romantic Robbery (2015)

=== Actor ===
- gorge (2010)
- Hamsengar (2011)
- Ferris Wheel (2012)
- The Red, The Lizard, Mr. & Mrs. Smith (2012)
- Before Sunrise (2014)
- Leave Your Problems to Us (2014)
- Under Eyelid (2015)
- A man on the silver mountain (2020)

=== Books ===
- Secrets of attracting a film sponsor and investor (2016)
- Video marketing for teachers (2019)

=== Awards ===
- Global Short Film Awards (Cannes 2019) – Winner Best Drama Film
- Global Short Film Awards (Cannes 2019) – Winner Best Film
- Eurasia International (Russia 2017) – Winner Best Film
- Eurasia International (Russia 2017) – Winner Best Director
- Rural Filmfest (Spain 2018) – Winner Best Drama Film
- Greenmotions Filmfest (Germany 2017) – Winner Best Movie
- Savigliano Filmfest (Italy 2017) – Winner Best Movie
- 10TH International Kuala Lumpur Eco Film Festival (Malaysia 2017) – Winner Best Short Film
- 6Th Persian Film Festivals (Australia 2017) – Winner Best Short Film

=== Official selected ===
- Versi di Luce Short Film Festival (Italy 2018)
- Philadelphia Environmental Film Festival (USA 2018)
- Norwich Radical Film Festival (UK 2018)
- Mexico Silent Film Festival (Mexico 2018)
- Sustainability Shorts Film Festival (2018)
- Oxford Film Festival (USA 2018)
- Chandler International Film Festival (USA January 2018)
- Sose International Film Festival (Armenia Aug 2017)
- Lyons Film Festival (USA June 2017)
- Canada's Yes! Let's Make a Movie Film Festival (Canada June 2017)
- Golden Bridge International Film Festival (Russia Feb 2018)
- Berlin Flash Film Festival (Germany March 2017)
- 8th Jagran Film Festival (India Sep 2017)
- Carmarthen Bay Film Festival (BAFTA Cymru Qualifying Festival) (UK May 2017)
- Caribbean Film Festival & Market (Bahama Aug 2017)
- Minikino Film Week (Indonesia 2017)
- 8TH Independent Short Film Festival (Iran 2017)
- Yari Iranian Film Festival (Sweden 2017)
- Adana International Film Festival (Turkey 2019)
- Savigliano Film Festival (Italy 2017)
- Art for Peace Film Festival (Iran 2017)
- All Lights India International Film Festival (India 2017)
- Cardiff International Film Festival (UK 2017)
- International Children's Film Festival, The Golden Elephant (India 2017)
- Persian Film Festival (Australia 2017)
- Fake Flash Film Fest (Canada 2017)
- MedFF (Italy 2017)
- 2017 Kaohsiung Film Festival International Short Film Completion (Taiwan 2017)
- Peace Film Festival (Iran 2017)
- 16th Third Eye Asian Film Festival (India 2017)
- 12thLecce Film Fest (Italy 2017)
- 21 Islands International Short Film Fest (USA 2017)
- Lebanon International Short Films Festival (Lebanon 2017)
- Independent Days International Filmfestival (Germany 2017)
- International Short Film Festival Kolkata (India 2017)
