= Mohsen Bahmani =

Iranian-German inventor and mechanical engineer

- محسن بهمنی
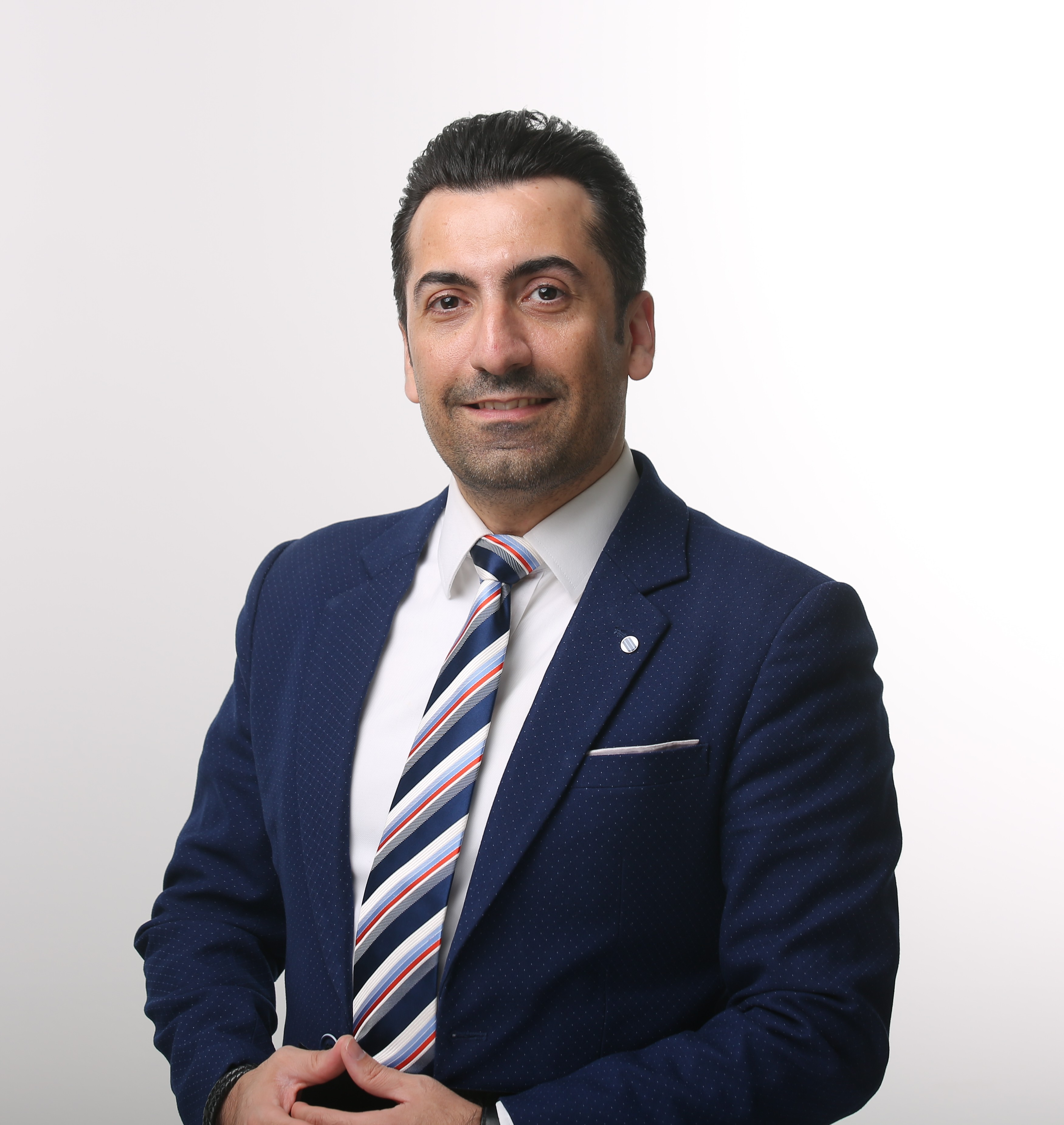
- Born: 1988
- Education: Karlsruhe Institute of Technology
- Occupations: Inventor, mechanical engineer
- Known for: Floating shoes; propeller-free propulsion concept
- Website: www.mohsenbahmani.com

Mohsen Bahmani (Persian: محسن بهمنی; born 1988) is an Iranian-German inventor and mechanical engineer. He studied mechanical engineering at the Karlsruhe Institute of Technology. He is known for his water-walking shoe invention and for a propeller-free propulsion concept intended for drones, flying taxis and other aerial vehicles.

== Early life and education ==
Bahmani was born in 1988 in Iran and developed an early interest in invention. He studied mechanical engineering at Karaj Azad University before moving to Germany, where he completed a further degree in mechanical engineering at the Karlsruhe Institute of Technology. By 2025 he had been working on inventions for more than twenty years.

== Floating shoes ==
Bahmani is among the subjects described in Alain de Botton's 2009 book The Pleasures and Sorrows of Work (Pantheon Books), which includes a description of his water-walking shoe invention and development process. De Botton described the shoes as fiberglass units fitted with miniature outboard motors, used alongside adapted ski-poles for balance, and designed to travel at fifteen kilometres per hour. De Botton wrote that Bahmani had spent five years refining the device, testing it in the waters near Mahmudabad on the Caspian Sea, and envisioned applications in both recreational and military markets.

In a May 2008 interview with Mehr News Agency, Bahmani described the shoes as consisting of two fiberglass air cushions beneath each foot, powered by a small lithium-battery motor providing two hours of operation per four-hour charge. The Student News Network reported in May 2008 that Bahmani described the device as consisting of three sections: fiberglass air cushions at the base providing buoyancy, a motor and differential unit as the power source, and a propeller in the upper section, and that the device had taken three years to develop.

Iran Newspaper (روزنامه ایران), one of Iran's largest national dailies, also reported on the floating shoe invention in May 2008, noting that Bahmani had succeeded in making one of humanity's most historic ideas — maintaining balance on the surface of water — a reality.

Catalan newspaper El Punt Avui reported that the devices were catamaran-like units attached to the feet, using a hydraulic system to help a person move across a water surface.

bne IntelliNews reported that Bahmani won a silver medal at the Archimedes Invention Competition in Moscow, a prize in Romania, and a second prize and scholarship at the Geneva Inventions Fair in April 2008. Following the Geneva exhibition, Mehr News Agency reported that he received a special prize from Romania's Ministry of Science and Research. El Universo, an Ecuadorian newspaper, additionally reported prizes at competitions in Moscow, Romania and Switzerland. Baden TV reported that the floating shoes were presented at international invention fairs. According to bne IntelliNews, Iranian authorities subsequently exempted Bahmani from national service and permitted him to continue his studies abroad. He later sold the rights to the floating shoe design to an Italian company.

== Propulsion concept ==
Bahmani's later work has focused on a propeller-free propulsion concept intended for drones, flying taxis and other aerial vehicles. German regional newspaper Wochenblatt described the concept as a closed-loop track with straight and curved sections, in which small electric impellers move through acceleration, energy-transfer, deceleration and return phases to generate a directed force.

Wochenblatt quoted Bahmani's description of an electrical supply method using a wire loop carrying high-frequency alternating current to power the moving impeller units wirelessly. The publication attributed to Bahmani the view that the concept is not a reactionless drive, as it interacts with gas molecules outside its own frame of reference. bne IntelliNews reported that Bahmani completed a working prototype in 2018 and that the invention was formally patented by the European Patent Office in 2022.

Autonomy Global, an advanced air mobility publication, noted in a 2026 analysis by aviation specialist Dawn M. Zoldi that the concept would require large-scale experimental validation of thrust-to-power ratios before commercial adoption, and that technical validation, commercialization and aviation certification remain unresolved.

In November 2022, the European Patent Office granted patent EP3565971B8, titled "Method and a system for generating fuel efficient force by accelerating object and using centrifugal force", to Bahmani and co-inventor Hossain Vafaey. The application had been filed on 14 February 2018.

== Mansory concept ==
In late 2023, German automotive customization company Mansory presented a flying-car concept called Empower. Design and technology publication Designboom reported on the concept in January 2024, describing it as a speculative render of a flying supercar that ditched wheels entirely, and noting that Mansory had not indicated a production timeline. Brazilian automotive publication Revista FullPower reported that the concept was developed in partnership with Bahmani.
