= Mohsen Mohammadpour =

Iranian protestor (2002–2018)

- محسن محمدپور
- Born: August 18, 2002; Khorramshahr, Iran
- Died: November 2019 (aged 17); Khorramshahr, Iran
- Education: High school Student
- Occupations: Student, Construction Worker

Mohsen Mohammadpour (Persian: محسن محمدپور) (August 18, 2002 – November 2019) was injured by the Islamic Republic regime's security forces during Iran's November 2019 protests and died shortly after.

== Life ==
Mohsen Mohammadpour Abu Jadiei was born in Khoramshahr in 2002. He was a high school student and worked as a construction worker after school to support his family. He was an avid football lover and a Persepolis F.C fan.

== Death ==
On November 16, 2019, Mohsen Mohammadpour was injured in the clashes with security forces during a protest rally at the Darvazeh Khorramshahr square on Hafez Street. He fell into a coma after being tased and receiving severe beatings by the security forces. He was hit by a baton in the neck and skull which sent him into a coma. He died after several days in the Valiasr hospital in Khorramshahr. Sources differ on the exact date of his death.

== Burial ==
After Mohsen Mohammadpour's death, his body was stolen by the Islamic regime security forces, and his family was extorted a hefty amount by IRGC forces (more than most Iranian families make in a year) to retrieve his body. When the family of Mohammadpour received their son's body, they realized that his body had been autopsied and some of his organs had been removed. Security forces had a heavy presence in his funeral and burial ceremony and his family was threatened not to speak to any media or inform others of the time and location of the ceremony in an attempt to cover up the situation concerning his death and the role of the security forces. In an effort to hijack the victims in the name of the regime, Islamic republic authorities later changed his gravestone and declared him a martyr, without his family's permission. The new tombstone is inscribed with the emblem and the name of the Islamic Republic Foundation of Martyrs and Veterans Affairs.

== Legacy ==
Graffiti and stencil paintings with Mohsen Mohammadpour's image were painted on walls in Tehran and other cities in his memory and as a protest to his brutal murder.
