= Mohsen al-Fanagry =

Egyptian Assistant of Defense Minister

Major General Mohsen Al-Fanagry is the Egyptian Assistant of Defense Minister. He is a member of the Supreme Council of the Armed Forces which ruled Egypt after Hosni Mubarak resigned in February 2011. He was given the responsibility of announcing the military communiques on Egyptian state TV during the 25th of January revolution.
