= Mohsen Shah-Ebrahimi =

Iranian art director, costume director and actor

Seyyed Mohsen Shah Ebrahimi (in Persian: سید محسن شاه ابراهیمی) is an Iranian art director, costume designer and actor.

== Early life and education ==
He was born in 1954, Iran. He studied art directing in the Faculty of Fine Arts in Florence, Italy (1980).

== Career ==
He started his career with By the Ponds (1986, Y. Noasri), and received the prize in FFF for The Night Nurse (1987, M.-A. Najafi). As well as being an art director, he has also acted in two films.

== Works ==
=== Production designer ===
- Mum's Guest (2004)
- In Amethyst Color (2005)
- Mokhtarnameh (2010 TV series)
- Muhammad: The Messenger of God (2015)
- Daughter (2016)
- Bomb: A Love Story (2018)
- Salman the Persian (2019 TV series)

=== Actor ===
- Eye of the Hurricane (1989}
- What Else Is New? (1991)
- The Snowman (1997)
- Mummy 3 (1998)
- Traveler of Rey (2000)
