= Mohsen Moazami =

Iranian-American entrepreneur

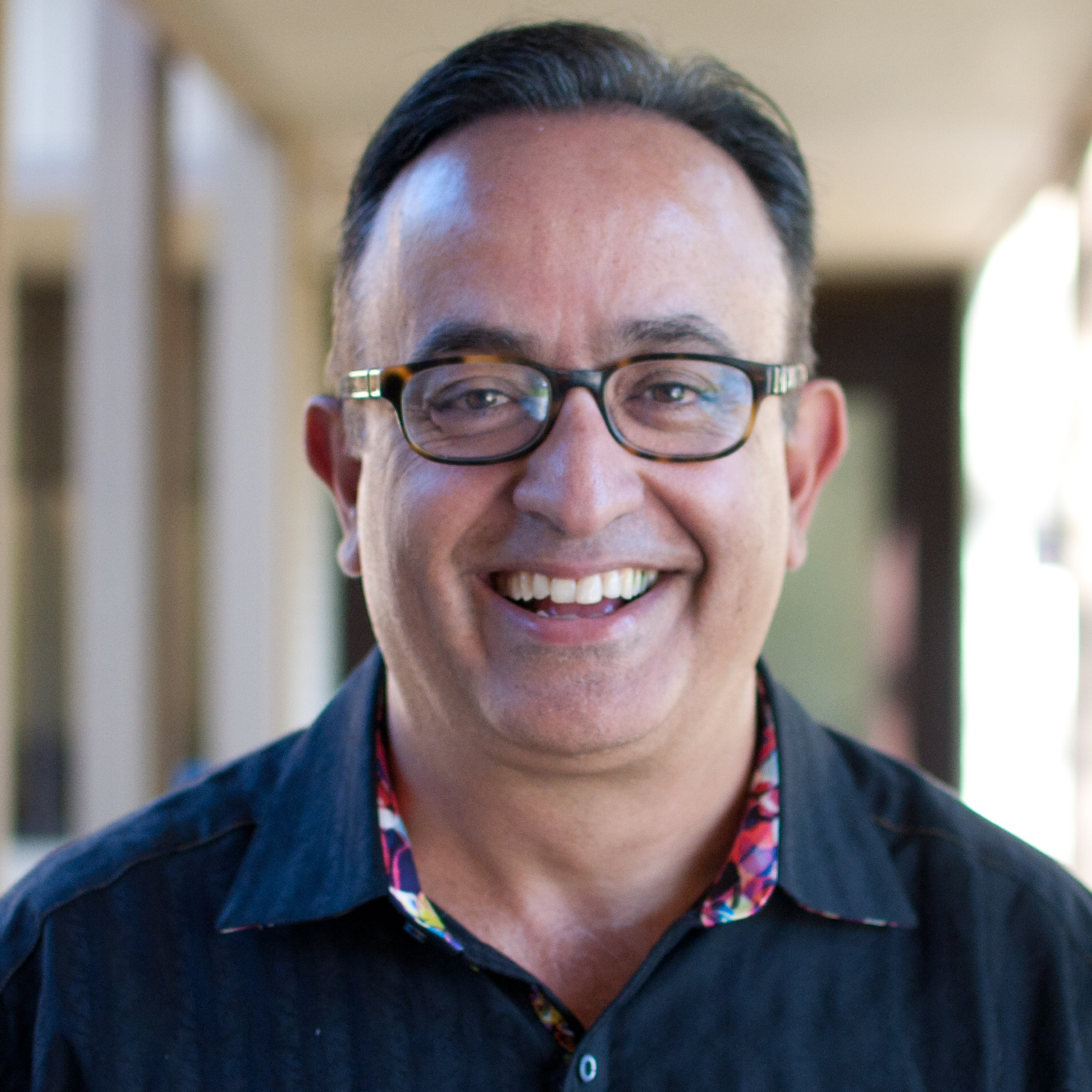
- Born: Tehran, Iran
- Education: Stanford University
- Occupation: entrepreneur

Mohsen Moazami is an Iranian-American entrepreneur. He has founded companies including Stanford Business Systems, CNTP, and Seif Capital. Moazami has also served as a member of Cisco Systems executive staff for 12 years, including as a member of the senior leadership team for emerging markets.

== Early life and education ==
Moazami was born and raised in Tehran, where he attended Iranzamin School. After earning his high school diploma, he moved to the U.S. for college and earned his master's degree at Stanford University.

== Career ==
Moazami founded Stanford Business Systems, which was acquired in 1995 by Kurt Salmon Associates, an Accenture company. Moazami became vice president in charge of global e-business. Additionally, he was senior partner and national director of the advanced technology group of Kurt Salmon Associates. He received the Ellis Island Medal of Honor in 2010.

For 12 years, Moazami worked for Cisco Systems in various roles, including membership in the senior leadership team for emerging markets. In 2011, Moazami invested in Bina Technologies, a startup company which builds hardware and software for genomic analysis. Bina was acquired by Hoffmann-La Roche in December 2014 Moazami is also founder, general partner, and managing director of CNTP. He joined the board of Aerospike in June 2014.

In August 2014, Moazami joined the board of vArmour, when CNTP invested in the firm. He served on the board of EPCglobal, a nonprofit radio-frequency identification standards group. Moazami is also on the board of Kaazing Corporation, Global Capacity, and UNDESA-GAID. He is founder and general partner of Seif Capital, a health and bio-science venture capital firm. Moazami and his wife, Laleh Amirteymour Kalali, opened a donor-advised fund with PARSA Community Foundation, an organization which aims to help various Persian causes. In 2015, Moazami joined the board of directors for Frame, a California-based cloud platform. In 2019, Moazami joined as an advisor for Inxeption, a California-based technology platform.
