= Mohsen Jafari Rad =

Iranian film director

- محسن جعفری‌راد

Mohsen Jafari Rad (Persian: محسن جعفری‌راد; November 1, 1986 – January 18, 2022) was an Iranian journalist, film writer, critic, film director and documentary maker from Rudsar.

== Career ==
Rad held a masters' degree in Cinema.

Most of his activities were carried out in the film magazine from 2006 to 2018.

He was simultaneously active as a reporter, journalist and critic in the fields of sociology, cinema and literature. He worked with multiple publications, including Hamshahri, Sharq, Etemad, Jam Jam, Farhikhtegan, Gilan Moroz, Hamdali, and Navavaran, and specialized monthly and weekly magazines such as Film, Experience, and Chalcheragh.

Rad started filmmaking in 2007 with Lahijan Youth Cinema Association, making short fiction and documentary films. He collaborated with the Iranian Youth Cinema Association, Lahijan, Rasht, Chalus offices, the Center for the Development of Documentary and Experimental Cinema, the Documentary House. Rad also taught cinema in colleges and private institutions and the Iranian Youth Cinema Association.

== Filmography ==
=== Documentaries ===
- Suffering under the Skin
- Green Shadows
- One of Us (series)

=== Short fiction films ===
- Only Meh is Real; produced by Rambad Javan.

== Protest activity and death ==
Mohsen Jafari was arrested at his home for taking part in the Mahsa Amini protests. He was released on bail after two weeks. He died shortly after, according to state sources due to suicide. His death was among tens of other unexplained deaths following release of Woman Life Freedom protesters.
