= Mohsin Siddiqui =

Pakistani politician

Senator Muhammad Mohsin Siddiqui

Member of the Senate of Pakistan
- In office 1985–1988

Personal details
- Died: 28 May 1990
- Occupation: Politician; Businessman

Muhammad Mohsin Siddiqui was a Pakistani politician and businessman who was the founder of Pakland Cement. He was the member of the Senate of Pakistan from 1985 to 1990.

Siddiqui was murdered in 1990 following ethnic clash during the 1988 Hyderabad, Sindh massacre.
