= Muhlis Suner =

Turkish politician

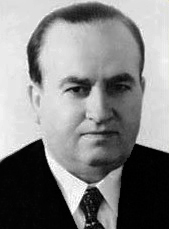

Member of the Grand National Assembly

Personal details
- Born: 1887 Bilecik, Ottoman Empire
- Died: 23 September 1969 (aged 81–82)

Muhlis Suner (1887 – 23 September 1969) was a Turkish Kemalist politician, and a prominent member of the CHP.
