= Mohsen Modarres Razavy =

Iranian-Canadian physicist, Contributor to the Theory of Quantum Tunneling

Mohsen Razavy
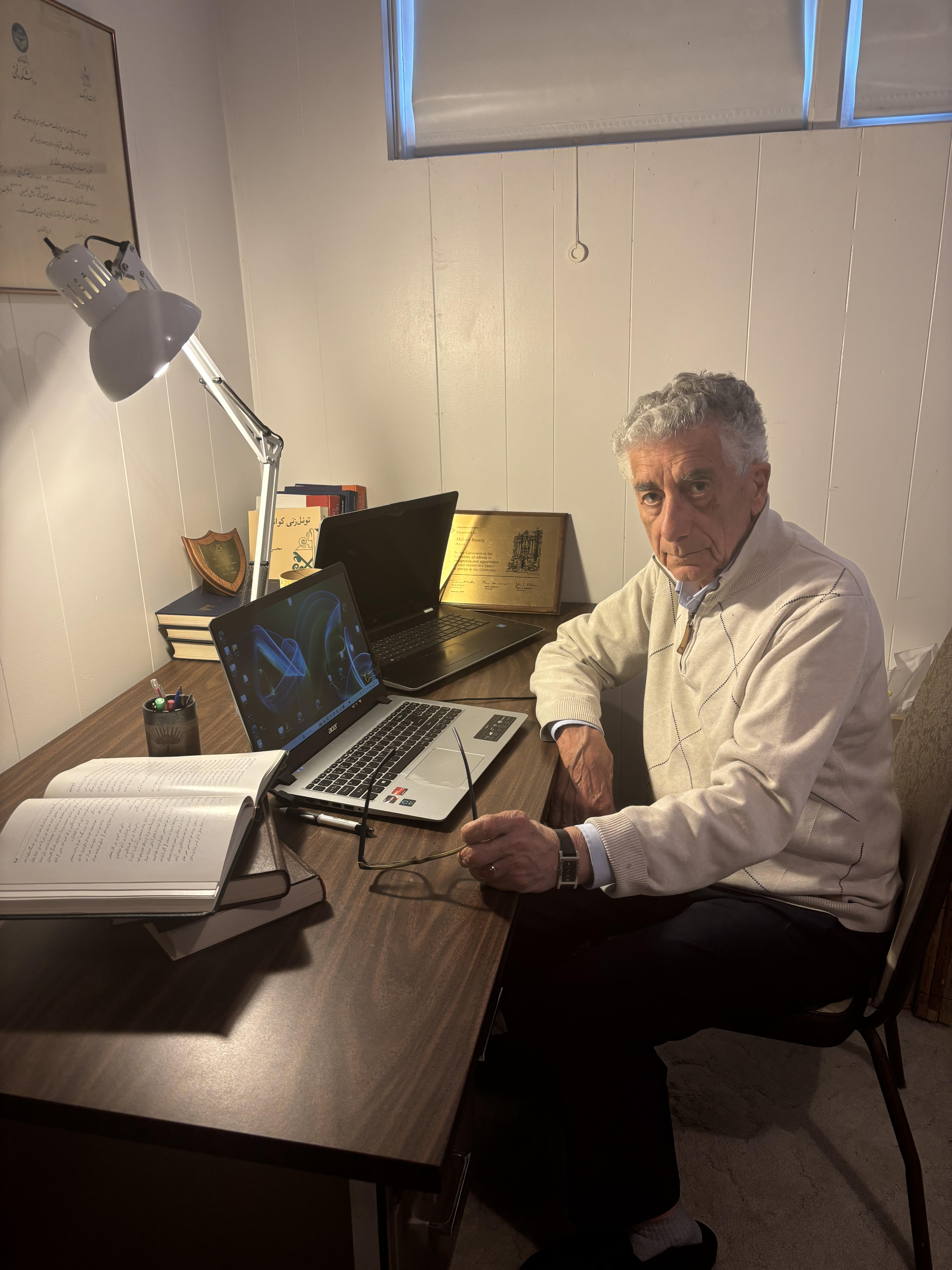
- Born: 25 February 1934 (age 92); Mashhad, Iran
- Citizenship: Iranian, Canadian
- Education: University of Tehran, Louisiana State University
- Relatives: Mohammad Taghi Modarres Razavi (father)

Mohsen (Modarres) Razavy (Persian: محسن مدرس رضوی) born 25 February 1934, is an Iranian-Canadian theoretical physicist known for his contributions to quantum mechanics, particularly in quantum tunneling, quasi-exactly solvable systems, and analytically tractable model potentials. He was a professor in the Department of Physics at the University of Alberta and is now Emeritus Professor.

== Early life and education ==
Razavy was born in Mashhad, Iran. He comes from a family with academic associations, and his father, Mohammad Taghi Modarres Razavi, was a professor at the University of Tehran.

Razavy received his Ph.D. in theoretical physics from Louisiana State University in 1961, submitting the thesis entitled Velocity‑Dependent Nuclear Forces. In July 1960, his first paper titled "Perturbation Theory Applied to the Nuclear Many‑Body Problem", co‑authored with J. S. Levinger, was published in Physical Review.

After completing his doctorate, Razavy joined the Nuclear Physics Laboratory at Cornell University, where he worked on calculating binding energies in atomic nuclei.

In 1962, Razavy joined the Department of Physics at the University of Alberta in Edmonton, Canada, where he remained for nearly four decades, and retired in 2000.

== Research Contributions ==
In 1966, Razavy was awarded the E.W.R. Steacie Memorial Fellowship by the Natural Sciences and Engineering Research Council of Canada (NSERC) in theoretical nuclear physics.

Razavy introduced the Razavy potential, a one-dimensional double-well potential constructed from hyperbolic functions. The model is quasi-exactly solvable, meaning that part of its energy spectrum and corresponding eigenfunctions can be obtained in closed analytic form, while the remaining states must be computed numerically.

The Razavy potential and related hyperbolic double-well potentials have been studied as examples of quasi-exactly solvable quantum mechanical systems. In these models, part of the energy spectrum and corresponding eigenfunctions can be obtained in analytic form, while the remaining eigenvalues are determined using numerical or semi-analytical methods.

Analytical and semi-analytical treatments of Razavy-type potentials have been developed using different approaches, including the asymptotic iteration method and related algebraic techniques. These studies confirm that such potentials allow exact solutions for certain parameter regimes while requiring numerical methods for the full spectrum.

== Publications ==
Razavy is the author of the following scientific books and over 150 peer-reviewed articles.

- Quantum Theory of Tunneling
  - Institute for Advanced Studies in Basic Sciences, 2004 (Persian edition))
  - 1st Edition: World Scientific, 2003 (English edition)
  - 2nd Edition: World Scientific, 2014 (English edition)
- Classical and Quantum Dissipative Systems
  - 1st Edition: Imperial College Press, 2005
  - 2nd Edition: World Scientific, 2015
- Heisenberg Quantum Mechanics
  - World Scientific, 2011
- An Introduction to Inverse Problems in Physics
  - World Scientific, 2020

In a review in Physics Today, J. G. Muga described Quantum Theory of Tunneling as providing “a rather impressive sweep of theoretical techniques” and considered it “useful for students and researchers alike”.

In a review in CERN Courier, A. Abbas described the book Classical and Quantum Dissipative Systems as a detailed and systematic account of dissipative phenomena in classical and quantum mechanics with applications to areas such as scattering and radiation effects.

In a review in Contemporary Physics, J. Rogel-Salazar described Heisenberg's Quantum Mechanics as a clear and accessible presentation of Heisenberg's formulation of quantum mechanics, suitable for advanced students and researchers.

Razavy is the author of the monograph An Introduction to Inverse Problems in Physics (2002), which presents mathematical methods for solving inverse problems in physics.
