= Mohsen Eslamzadeh =

Iranian documentary filmmaker

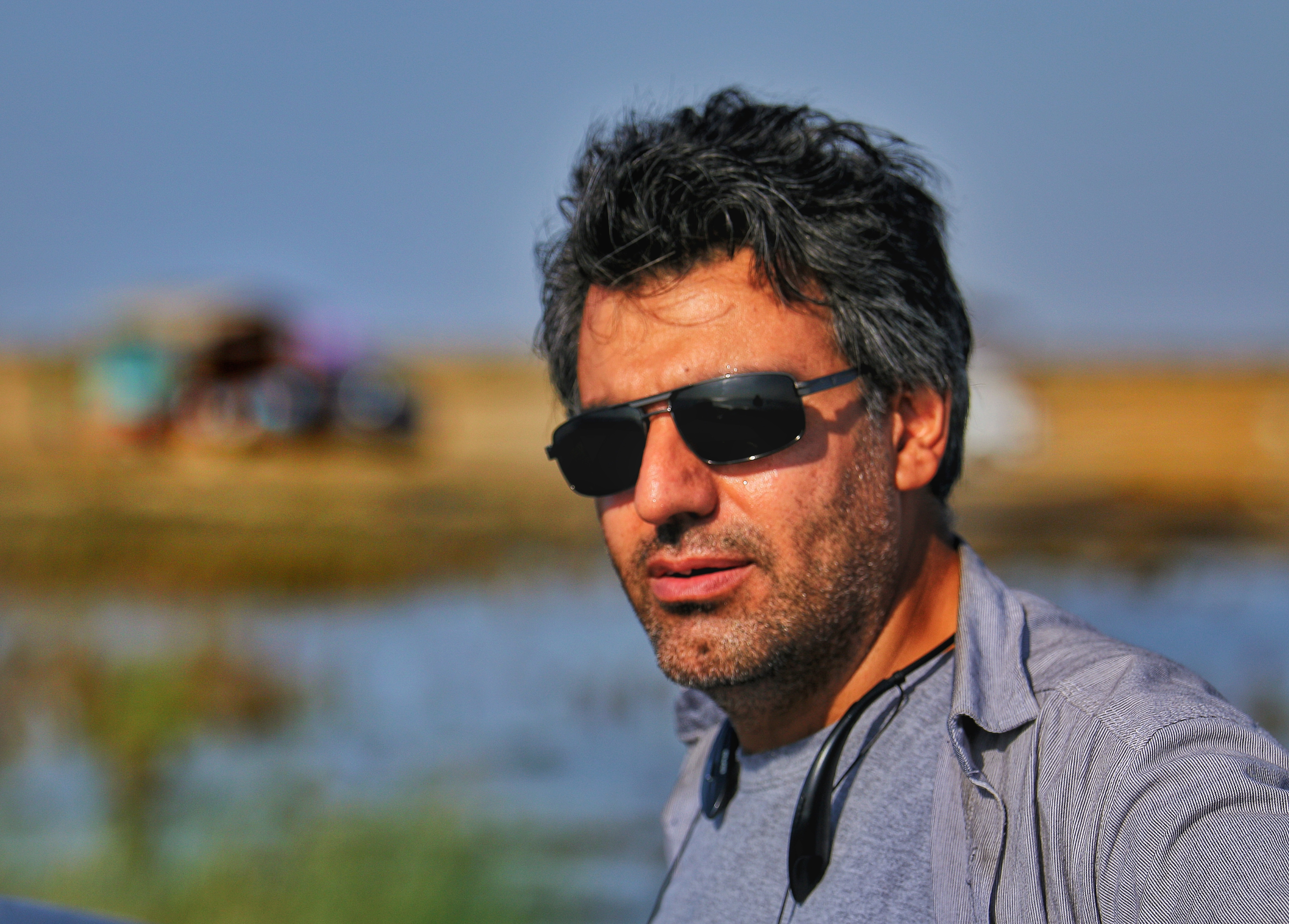
- Born: 1980 (age 45–46); Mashhad, Iran
- Occupations: Director, Producer

Mohsen Eslamzadeh is an Iranian documentary filmmaker. He is the director of Alone Among The Taliban. This film has won the best documentary award at the 44th Athens International Film and Video Festival in the United States. This film has won the best documentary award at the 12th Marbella International Film Festival in Spain. This film has won the Shahid Avini Award offers.

== Filmography ==
- “The Sunnies of Iran”
- “Mothers of the Revolution”
- “Mysteries of Abu-Salim Prison”
- “In the name of Liberty”
- “Looking for Peace”
- “Alone Among The Taliban”
- The Dream of Marjaan

== Awards and honors ==
- The competition of the international festival of documentary films "Meetings in Siberia" | Russia, 2018
- The competition of the "Tiburon International Film Festival" | USA, 2017
- The best documentary of “Athen international film + video festival” | USA, 2017
- The best documentary of “Marbella international film festival” | Spain, 2017
- The “Moscow detective film festival” | Russia, 2017
- The competition of the “Thin line film festival” | USA, 2017
- The competition of the “Asia-Pacific Film Festival” | 2016
- The competition of the “Human rights film festival” | Italy, 2017
- The competition of the “Ismailia international film festival” | Egypt, 2017
- The winner of the “Shahid Avini” international section of the “Cinema Verite” | Iran, 2015
- The winner of the “Ammar popular film festival” | Iran, 2015
- The 8th “Ammar film festival” for The Documentary of “Qasr-e-Qand” | Iran, 2018
- The 7th “Ammar film festival” for The TV show of “Vatandar” | Iran, 2017
- The winner of the 5th Ammar festival for the film "Sunnis in Iran"
- The winner of the international section of the forth Ammar festival for the film "Journey to the Land of Pashtuns"
- The winner of the special section of “Ruyesh” (growth) festival for the film “Mother of the Revolution”
- The winner of the international section of the third Ammar festival for the film “ the Thought of Being”
- The honored young documentary director from Mashhad in 2010 chosen by Mashhad's Islamic Revolution Cultural Centre.
- The honored in the “Awakening Sequence” for the film “the Lover”
- The honored in the first Ammar film Festival for the film “the Street of Martyrdom”

He is a former guest of the many film festivals such as:

- The “Nahj film festival” for The documentary of “Me and the commander” | Iraq, 2016
- The Festival as a guest speaker “Aljazeera film festival” for the film “Mysteries of Abusalim Prison” | Qatar, 2013
- The “Resistance international film festival” for the film of “Al-Sheikh Sabah” | Iran, 2015

Eslamzadeh participated in few film festivals such as: “Fajr”, “Cinema Verity” and “Rooyesh” in Iran. Eslamzadeh has won numerous awards and fellowships including “Aljazeera” in Qatar and “Human Rights” in Spain and he awarded in some of them.
