= Mohsen Ali Haidarah Qasem Alomari =

Yemeni politician

Mohsen Ali Haidarah Qasem Al-Omari
- محسن علي حيدرة قاسم العمري
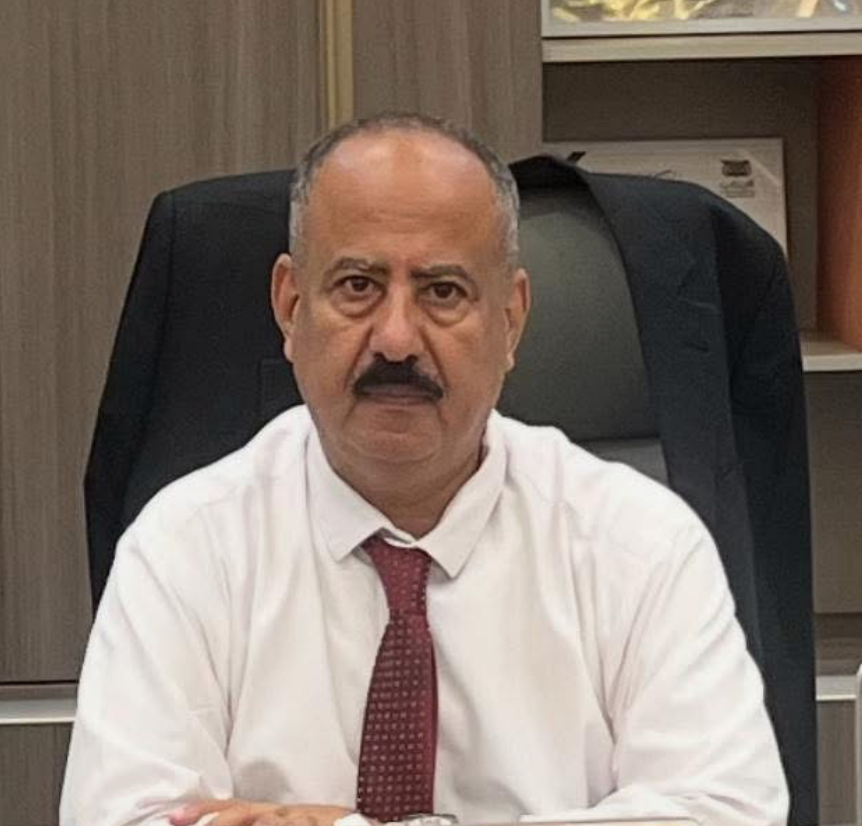
- Mohsen Ali Haidarah Qasem Al-Omari, Minister of Transport of Yemen

Minister of Transport
- Incumbent
- Assumed office 6 February 2026

Personal details
- Born: 30 December 1970 (age 55) Aden, Yemen

Mohsen Ali Haidarah Qasem Al-Omari (Arabic: محسن علي حيدرة قاسم العمري; born 30 December 1970) is a Yemeni politician and aviation executive who has served as the Minister of Transport of Yemen since 6 February 2026.

== Career ==
Before his appointment as minister, Al-Omari held senior positions at Yemenia Airways, including serving as Deputy General Manager for Commercial Affairs and Commercial Director.

== Minister of Transport ==
On 6 February 2026, Al-Omari was appointed Minister of Transport in the Government of Yemen as part of the newly formed cabinet.
