= Mohsen Bahrami =

Iranian actor

- محسن بهرامی
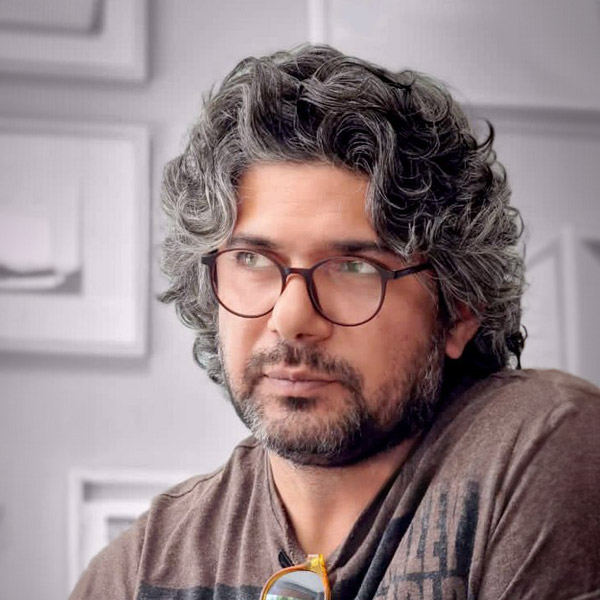
- Born: March 25, 1982 (age 43); Tehran, Iran
- Occupation: Actor، presenter، voice actor
- Years active: 1994–present

Mohsen Bahrami (Persian: محسن بهرامی; born 25 March 1982, in Tehran) is an Iranian actor, presenter and voice actor. He is a graduate of the high school of acting in the field of art and started his career in 1994 with the series "Friend's Footprint" (Persian: ردپای دوست), but his professional career started with acting in the theater "Lost" (Persian: از دست رفته) directed by Farhad Aslani in 2001.

== Activities ==
=== Theater ===
He started acting in the theater by playing in the "Lost" directed by Farhad Aslani . In recent years, he has acted in many plays, the most prominent of which are " Cherry Orchard " directed by Akbar Zanjanpour, "Dar Amaaq" directed by Mustafa Abdullahi, "Gol va Qadare" directed by Behzad Farahani, "Rag" directed by Ayub Aghakhani, "Father" directed by Mahmoud Zendenaam, "Molly Sweeney" and "The house is closed" directed by Shima Farahmand.

Year	Display Name	Director
2001	Lost	Farhad Aslani
2012	Molly Sweeney	Shima Farhamand
2014	The House is Closed	Shima Farhamand
2014	My Love is Football	Shayan Afkari
2014	A play for you (Play Reading)	Ehsan Karami
2015	Tehran under The Wings of Angels (Play Reading)	Nader Borhani Marand
2015	Gol va Qadare	Behzad Farahani
2015	The Lower Depths	Mustafa Abdullahi
2015	Happy Birthday Peyman	Shayan Afkari
2016	The Cherry Orchard	Akbar Zanjanpur
2017	Hafte Asr Haftome Payeez	Ayub Aghakhani
2017	The Father	Mahmoud Zendenaam
2018	Trucage (Dubbing)	Mohammad Reza Qolipour
2019	Rag	Ayub Aghakhani
2019	The Son	Ali Moghadam
2020	A room in the Plaza Hotel (Movie Theater)	Maryam Bagheri
2021	Qajari Mansion	Maryam Bagheri
2023	Rhino reading (Play Reading)	Keyvan Kasirian
2024	Bijan and Manijeh	Shokrkhoda Goodarzi
2024	Songs of Thebes	Ayub Aghakhani
2024	Acting	Akbar Zanjanpur

In one of his conversations, Bahrami described acting in the theater as follows: "A theater actor must always be ready physically and in terms of acting, and he cannot retouch his mistakes. In the picture, the image of the actor is filmed according to the size of the frame that the director wants from you. In the theater you have to be perfect and flawless."

=== Television ===
So far, he has appeared in series such as "City Lights" directed by Masoud Keramati, "The Innocents" directed by Ahmad Amini, "It Might Happen to You Too" directed by Ahmad Moazzami, " Navar Zard " directed by Pouria Azarbaijani, "Puzzle" series and " Najva " directed by Ebrahim Sheibani and "Salaam Aghaaye Modir" directed by Alireza Tavana, and in addition to that, he appeared in telefilms such as "Dar Miyaane Saayeh Haa" directed by Masoud Keramati and "Hidden Wisdom" directed by Majid Torbati. He has also played a role in the TV series "Shahrag" directed by Seyyed Jalal Dehghani Ashkezari.

Year	Title	Director
1994	Rade Paaye Dust Series	Abbas Ranjbar
2004	City Lights Series	Masoud Keramati
2006	Hidden Wisdom Telefilm	Majid Torbati
2007	Bone Telefilm	Farhad Alizadeh Aahi
2008	The Innocents series	Ahmad Amini
2008	Dar Miyane Saaye Haa Telefilm	Masoud Keramati
2009	It Might Happen to You Too	Ahmed Moazzemi
2014	Puzzle	Ebrahim Sheibani
2017	Najva Series	Ebrahim Sheibani
2017	Navaare Zard Series	Pouria Azarbaijani
2019	Salaam Aghaaye Modir	Alireza Tavana
2020	Shahrag Series	Seyyed Jalal Ashkezari
2023	Bazpors Series	Ahmad Moazzami
2024	Hasht Paa Series	Ahmad Moazzami

Bahrami was the host of the "Rade Paa" television contest that was broadcast on IRIB TV5 channel.

He also had the experience of performing in the "Radio Haft" program of the IRIB Amoozesh TV channel.

Bahrami also has a prominent presence in the "Barge Aval" program produced in 1400 by iFilm Channel, which is a program centered on books and reading.

=== Streaming Media Services ===
Year	Title	Role	Director
2024	The Asphalt Jungle Series	Houman	Pejman Teymourtash

=== Sevina ===
Bahrami has had several collaborations with "Sevina Group" (special cinema for the blind people). This group was established in 2018 by Gelareh Abbasi to provide cultural and artistic products to the blind people and also to support the abilities of the blind people in the cultural and artistic fields of the country.

=== Radio ===
Mohsen Bahrami has also been active as a radio actor in the General Department of Performing Arts of Radio since 2009.

The "Namvarnameh" program narrated and acted by Mohsen Bahrami is the first radio drama version of Shahnameh, which started broadcasting on May 15, 2022, coinciding with the day of preservation of Persian language and commemoration of Ferdowsi on IRIB Radio Namayesh.

=== Cinema ===
Voice acting of the role of Abbas Bin Ali in the movie "Hussein Who Said No" directed by Ahmad Reza Darvish was performed by Mohsen Bahrami.

=== Audio Books and Shows ===
He has also performed significant activities in the field of voiceover for audio books and audio shows, which can be seen from his presence as a narrator and announcer in the Sherlock Holmes book, Rebecca audio show, The Picture of Dorian Gray book, Fear and Trembling book, etc.

Playing the role of Gol Mohammad by Mohsen Bahrami in the audio version of the book "Kelidar" by Mahmoud Dowlatabadi, which is considered one of the most prominent Persian audio works, was well received by the audience.

== Awards ==
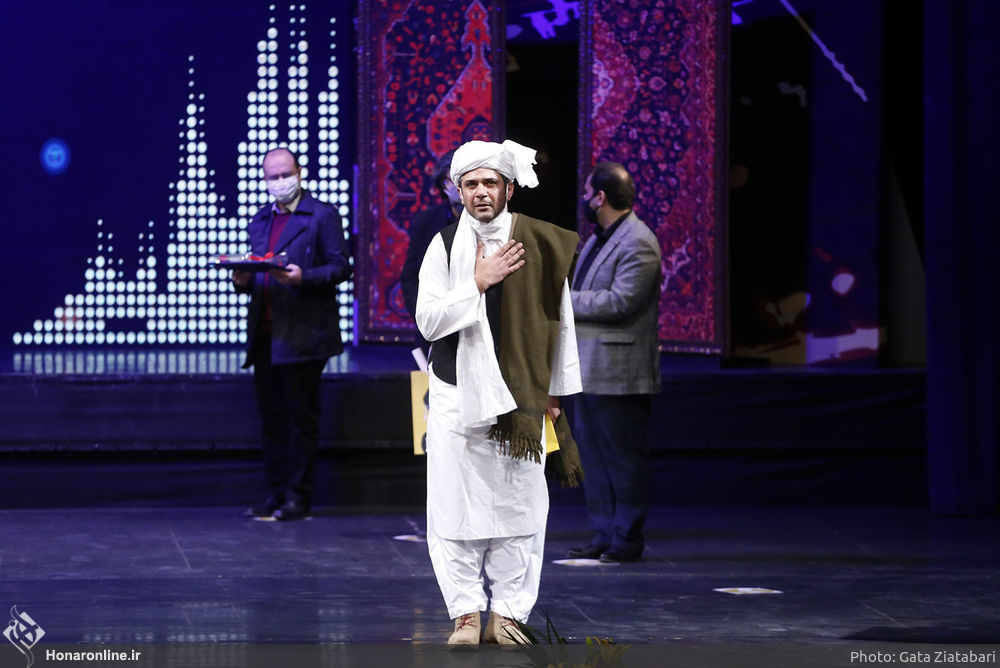
Mohsen Bahrami at the closing ceremony of the 36th Fajr Music Festival

In 2009, Bahrami received the statue of the first male actor in the radio drama section of the 13th Student Theater Festival.

Also, in the section announcing the electronic works of the Children's Book Council, which was held in August 2021, Bahrami was awarded the selected plaque and "The Small Black Fish Badge" (2019) for the narration of Sherlock Holmes book.

Attending the closing ceremony of the 36th Fajr Music Festival, as a representative of the Dorpour family, he received an honorary diploma for the best singing of the region's music (Noor Mohammad Dorpour for the Dordaneh album).
