= Mohsen Asle Zaeem =

American materials scientist and engineer

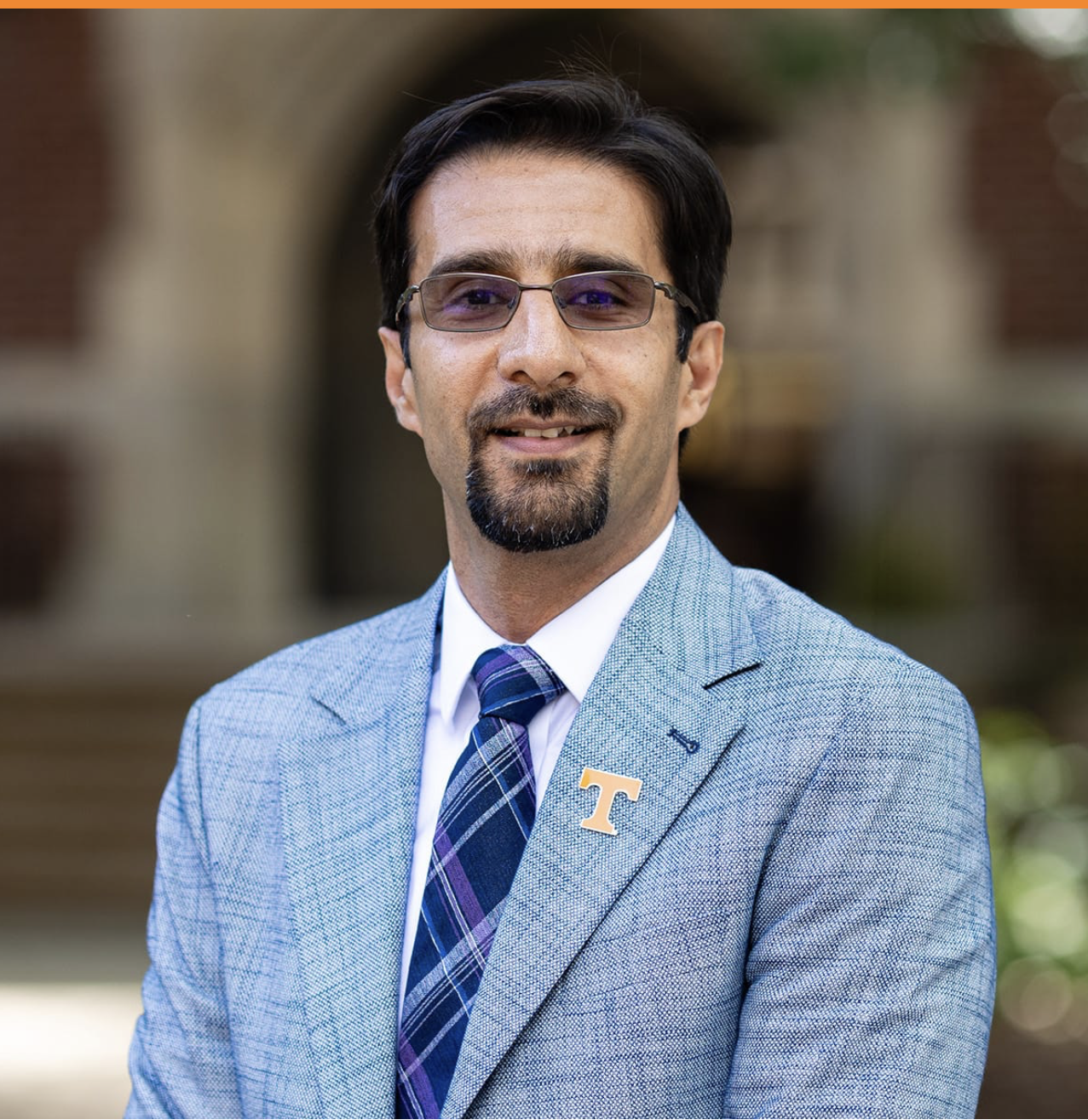
- Education: Shiraz University (BSc, MSc); Washington State University (PhD)
- Awards: Brimacombe Medal (2024); Fellow of the ASME (2018); TMS–FEMS Young Leader International Scholar Award (2017)
- Scientific career
- Fields: Materials science; mechanical engineering; computational materials science
- Workplaces: University of Tennessee, Knoxville; Colorado School of Mines; Missouri University of Science and Technology

Mohsen Asle Zaeem is a materials scientist and engineer who is currently serving as Department Head and Cook Eversole Endowed Chair Professor in the Department of Materials Science and Engineering at the University of Tennessee, Knoxville. His research is in the area of computational materials science, multiscale modeling, phase-field modeling, and the design of shape-memory ceramics, metallic alloys, and two-dimensional materials.

== Education ==
Asle Zaeem received his Bachelor of Science and Master of Science degrees in Mechanical Engineering from Shiraz University in 2003 and 2006, respectively, and his Ph.D. in Mechanical Engineering from Washington State University in 2010.

== Academic career ==
After completing his doctorate, Asle Zaeem joined the Center for Advanced Vehicular Systems at Mississippi State University, where he served as a post-doctoral research associate and later as an assistant research professor and lecturer. In 2012 he joined the Missouri University of Science and Technology as an assistant professor of materials science and engineering, later becoming the Roberta and G. Robert Couch Associate Professor after earning tenure. In 2018 he joined the Colorado School of Mines as an associate professor and was subsequently appointed Fryrear Endowed Chair Professor for Innovation and Excellence. in the Department of Mechanical Engineering and Materials Science.

From 2022 to 2024, Asle Zaeem served as a Program Director at the National Science Foundation in the Division of Materials Research, overseeing the Designing Materials to Revolutionize and Engineer our Future (DMREF) program. In 2025 he became Department Head and Cook Eversole Endowed Chair Professor at the University of Tennessee, Knoxville.

== Research and contributions ==
He has authored more than 130 peer-reviewed journal articles, two book chapters, and delivered over 50 invited lectures internationally. According to Google Scholar (October 2025), his work has received over 6,500 citations with an h-index of 45.

== Selected honors and awards ==
- Brimacombe Medal (2024), The Minerals, Metals & Materials Society (TMS).
- Faculty Research Excellence Award, Colorado School of Mines (2021).
- ASME Materials Processing Technical Committee Chair (2020).
- Fellow of the American Society of Mechanical Engineers (2018).
- TMS–FEMS Young Leader International Scholar Award (2017).
- Faculty Research Excellence Award, Missouri University of Science and Technology (2016).

== Selected publications ==
1. Kavousi S., and Prof. Asle Zaeem M. “Integration of multiscale simulations and machine learning for predicting dendritic microstructures in solidification of alloys.” Acta Materialia 289 (2025): 120860.
2. Bhattacharya A., and Prof. Asle Zaeem M. “Kinetics of ferroelastic domain switching with and without back-switching events: A phase-field study.” Acta Materialia 286 (2025): 120702.
3. Asle Zaeem M., Thomas S., Kavousi S., Zhang N., Mukhopadhyay T., and Mahata A. “Multiscale computational modeling techniques in study and design of 2D materials: recent advances, challenges, and opportunities.” 2D Materials 11 (2024): 042004.
4. Kavousi S., Ankudinov V., Galenko P. K., and Prof. Asle Zaeem M. “Atomistic-informed kinetic phase-field modeling of non-equilibrium crystal growth during rapid solidification.” Acta Materialia 253 (2023): 118960.
5. Kavousi S., Novak B., Moldovan D., and Prof. Asle Zaeem M. “Quantitative prediction of rapid solidification by integrated atomistic and phase-field modeling.” Acta Materialia 211 (2021): 116885.
6. Mahata A., Mukhopadhyay T., Chakraborty S., and Prof. Asle Zaeem M. “Atomistic simulation-assisted error-inclusive Bayesian machine learning for probabilistically unraveling mechanical properties of solidified metals.” npj Computational Materials 10 (2024): 22.

== See also ==
- University of Tennessee, Knoxville
- Computational materials science
- Phase-field model
