= Roland de Mecquenem =

Roland de Mecquenem may refer to:

- Roland de Mecquenem (archaeologist) (1877–1957), French archaeologist
- Roland de Mecquenem (soldier), French army officer
