= Muhsin Jassim Al-Musawi =

Iraqi academic and literary critic

- Born: 1944 (age 81–82); Nasiriyah, Iraq
- Education: University of Baghdad (BA) Dalhousie University (PhD)
- Occupations: Literary critic, author, and educator.
- Notable work: The Medieval Islamic Republic of Letters: Arabic Knowledge Construction, Postcolonical Arabic Novel: Debating Ambivalence

Muhsin Jassim Al-Musawi, (محسن جاسم الموسوي; born in 1944), is an Iraqi scholar and a professor of Classical and Modern Arabic Literature, Comparative and Cultural Studies at Columbia University. He has written books like The Arabian Nights in Contemporary World Cultures: Global Commodification, Translation, and the Culture Industry and The Medieval Islamic Republic of Letters: Arabic Knowledge Construction.

In 1978, he received his PhD from Dalhousie University, Nova Scotia, Canada. His doctoral thesis here was later revised, then published as Scheherazade in England : a study of nineteenth-century English criticism of the Arabian nights.

== Occupations ==
Muhsin Jassim Al-Musawi is currently a professor of Classical and Modern Arabic Literature, Comparative and Cultural Studies at Columbia University in New York. In addition, he is the editor-in-chief for the Journal of Arabic Literature.

== Awards ==
In 2002, Muhsin Jassim Al-Musawi won the Sultan Bin Ali Al-Owais Cultural Award, honored in the Literary Studies and Criticism category.

In 2018, Al-Musawi won the Kuwait Prize for Arts and Literature. The Kuwait Foundation for the Advancement of Sciences announced the award, based on Al-Musawi's "research on critical studies of the rich Arabic cultural and innovative contributions to postcolonial literature in English." In addition, he won the Tunis International Book Fair Prize in recognition of his scholarly works in general.

In 2022, Al-Musawi won the King Faisal International Prize, an award for "dedicated men and women whose contributions make a positive difference". According to kingfaisalprize.org, he was awarded the prize for his "encyclopedic knowledge in both classical and modern Arabic literature". In the same year, he won the Sheikh Zayed Book Award for writing The Arabian Nights in Contemporary World Cultures: Global Commodification, Translation, and the Culture Industry.
