= Lists of ambassadors of Iran =

Lists of ambassadors of Iran is divided into:

- List of ambassadors of Iran to Australia
- List of ambassadors of Iran to Armenia
- List of ambassadors of Iran to Azerbaijan
- List of ambassadors of Iran to Bahrain
- List of ambassadors of Iran to China
- List of ambassadors of Iran to Egypt
- List of ambassadors of Iran to Germany
- List of ambassadors of Iran to India
- List of ambassadors of Iran to Indonesia
- List of ambassadors of Iran to Iraq
- List of ambassadors of Iran to Japan
- List of ambassadors of Iran to Jordan
- List of ambassadors of Iran to Morocco
- List of ambassadors of Iran to Pakistan
- List of ambassadors of Iran to Saudi Arabia
- List of ambassadors of Iran to Spain
- List of ambassadors of Iran to Switzerland
- List of ambassadors of Iran to Syria
- List of ambassadors of Iran to Tajikistan
- List of ambassadors of Iran to Thailand
- List of ambassadors of Iran to Turkey
- List of ambassadors of Iran to Turkmenistan
- List of ambassadors of Iran to the United Arab Emirates
- List of ambassadors of Iran to the United Kingdom
- List of ambassadors of Iran to United Nations Office at Vienna
- List of ambassadors of Iran to the United States
- List of ambassadors of Iran to Uzbekistan
- List of Iranian ambassadors under President Khatami
- List of current ambassadors from Iran
