= List of ambassadors of Iran to Iraq =

Coordinates: 33.323539°N 44.397469°E

Ambassador of Iran to Iraq
- Coat of Arms of Iran
- Incumbent; Mohammad-Kazem Ale-Sadegh since May 17, 2022
- Nominator: Quds Force
- Appointer: President of Iran
- Inaugural holder: Hassan Ali Kamal Hedayat
- Formation: 1931

The Iranian ambassador in Baghdad is the official representative of the Government in Tehran to the Government of Iraq. The ambassador is nominated by Quds Force.

== List of representatives ==
Diplomatic accreditation	Diplomatic accreditation Solar Hijri calendar	Ambassador	Persian language	Observations	List of presidents of Iran	List of prime ministers of Iraq	Term end	Term end Solar Hijri calendar
1931	1309	Hassan Ali Kamal Hedayat	Persian: حسنعلی کمال هدایت	Hassan Ali Kamal Hedayat	Reza Shah	Nuri al-Said	1929	1307
1931	1309	Taqi Nabavi	Persian: تقی نبوی	Muazziz-ud-Dauleb, Mohammed Taqi Nabavi (Moazid-ud-Dowleh) (F.O. 150; M.A. 188) to be Persian Minister to Czechoslovakia. He is father-in-law to Abul Hasan Ibtehaj, Governor of the Banque-i-Milli.	Reza Shah	Nuri al-Said	1933	1311
1933	1311	Bagher Kazemi	Persian: باقر کاظمی		Reza Shah	Jamil al-Midfai	1934	1312
1934	1312	Anajat-ollah Samii	Persian: عنایت‌الله سمیعی	Enayatollah Sami'i, From February 1932 to 1934 he was Iranian ambassador to Germany. The new Persian Minister to Iraq, Sami Khan, arrived in Baghdad in December from Berlin, where he has been Persian Minister for a few years. Sami Khan was Persian Minister in Iraq in 1928, when the first Iraqi-Persian treaty was signed.	Reza Shah	Ali Jawdat al-Aiyubi	1937	1315
1937	1315	Mozaffar Alam	Persian: مظفر اعلم		Reza Shah	Jamil al-Midfai	1939	1317
1941	1319	Abol Qassem Nadschm	Persian: ابوالقاسم نجم		Mohammad Reza Pahlavi	Jamil al-Midfai	1941	1319
1942	1320	Musa Nuri Esfandiari	Persian: موسی نوری اسفندیاری		Mohammad Reza Pahlavi	Nuri al-Said	1944	1322
1944	1322	Mohsen Rais	Persian: محسن رئیس		Mohammad Reza Pahlavi	Hamdi al-Pachachi	1948	1326
1949	1327	Mohammad Shayesteh	Persian: محمد شایسته	From February 7, 1940 /February 13, 1940 to November 19, 1945 he was Iranian ambassador to the United States	Mohammad Reza Pahlavi	Muzahim al-Pachachi	1951	1329
1951	1329	Mahmud Salahi	Persian: محمود صلاحی		Mohammad Reza Pahlavi	Nuri al-Said	1952	1330
1952	1330	Hossein Ghods-Nakhai	Persian: حسین قدس نخعی		Mohammad Reza Pahlavi	Mustafa Mahmud al-Umari	1953	1331
1954	1332	Mozaffar Alam	Persian: مظفر اعلم		Mohammad Reza Pahlavi	Nuri al-Said	1954	1332
1954	1332	Hossein Ghods-Nakhai	Persian: حسین قدس نخعی		Mohammad Reza Pahlavi	Nuri al-Said	1957	1335
1957	1335	Nader Batmanghelidj	Persian: نادر باتمانقلیچ	Major General	Mohammad Reza Pahlavi	Ali Jawdat al-Aiyubi	1959	1337
1959	1337	Amanullah Ardalan	Persian: برادران اردلان	Ardalan, Amanullah (Haji Izz-uI-Mamalik) Born about 1888.	Mohammad Reza Pahlavi	Abd al-Karim Qasim	1961	1339
1961	1339	Yadollah Azodi	Persian: یدالله عضدی		Mohammad Reza Pahlavi	Abd al-Karim Qasim	1961	1339
1961	1339	Abbas Aram	Persian: غلام‌عباس آرام		Mohammad Reza Pahlavi	Abd al-Karim Qasim	1963	1341
1963	1341	Mohammad Hossein Mashayekh Faridani	Persian: محمدحسین مشایخ فریدنی	Doctor In 1961 he was Iranian ambassador to Saudi Arabia	Mohammad Reza Pahlavi	Ahmed Hassan al-Bakr	1965	1343
1965	1343	Seid-Mehdi Pirasteh	Persian: سید مهدی پیراسته	1962-1972 he was Iranian ambassador to Belgium	Mohammad Reza Pahlavi	Abd al-Rahman al-Bazzaz	1968	1346
1968	1346	Ezatullah Ameli	Persian: عزت‌الله عاملی	Jan 24, 1970 - TEHRAN The Iranian Ambassador to Baghdad, Ezatullah Ameli, who was asked to leave the country immediately by the Government of Iraq, arrived in Tehran from Baghdad by plane the night before.	Mohammad Reza Pahlavi	Ahmed Hassan al-Bakr	January 24, 1970	1348
1970	1348	Majid Mehran	Persian: مجید کامران	Chargé d'affaires	Mohammad Reza Pahlavi	Ahmed Hassan al-Bakr	1972	1350
1974	1352	Hossein Shahidzadeh	Persian: حسین شهیدزاده	(* 1922 in Qom Diplomat and Painter. Graduated from the Tehran University, Doctorate in Political science from the University of Neuchâtel. Fifth Political Department in Foreign Ministry (1971–74); Promote in the Rank of Ambassador in 1972; Iranian Ambassador to Baghdad (1974); Painter of the religious subjects (Exhibition, November 1973, Tehran)	Mohammad Reza Pahlavi	Ahmad Hasan al-Bakr	1977	1355
1977	1355	Mir Sadegh Sadrieh	Persian: میرصادق صدریه	Sadegh Sadrieh (Persian: میرصادق صدریه; (2 February 1925 – 5 November 2009) was a prominent Iranian politician and diplomat who served as Foreign Ministry Office Counselor and as Ambassador during the Pahlavi era	Mohammad Reza Pahlavi	Ahmad Hasan al-Bakr	1979	1357
1979	1357	Fereydoun Adamyat	Persian: فریدون زندفرد		Mohammad Reza Pahlavi	Saddam Hussein	1979	1357
1979	1357	Seyyed Mahmoud Doaei	Persian: سید محمود دعایی	Chargé d'affaires	Mohammad Reza Pahlavi	Saddam Hussein	1981	1359
September 22, 1980	1358			Interruption of the diplomatic relation due to the Iran–Iraq War, the Protecting power was Turkey	Abolhassan Banisadr	Saddam Hussein	August 20, 1988	1366
October 1, 1988	1366			Coalition Provisional Authority	Ali Khamenei	Saddam Hussein		
2005	1385	Hassan Kazemi Qomi	Persian: حسن کاظمی قمی		Mahmoud Ahmadinejad	Ibrahim al-Dschafari	2010	1389
2017	1389	Hassan Danaeifar	Persian: حسن دانایی‌فر		Mahmoud Ahmadinejad	Nouri al-Maliki	2017	1395
April 18, 2017	1395	Iraj Masjedi	Persian: ایرج مسجدی		Hassan Rouhani	Haider al-Abadi	April 11, 2022	1401
May 17, 2022	1401	Mohammad-Kazem Al-e Sadegh	Persian: محمدکاظم آل صادق		Ebrahim Raisi	Mustafa Al-Kadhimi		

== See also ==
- Iran–Iraq relations
