= The Fall of Heaven =

2016 book by Andrew Scott Cooper

The Fall of Heaven: The Pahlavis and the Final Days of Imperial Iran
- Author: Andrew Scott Cooper
- Language: English
- Genre: Contemporary history, biography
- Publisher: Henry Holt and Co.
- Publication date: August 2, 2016
- Publication place: United States
- Pages: 608
- ISBN: 9780805098976
- OCLC: 922169321
- Preceded by: The Oil Kings: How the U.S., Iran, and Saudi Arabia Changed the Balance of Power in the Middle East

The Fall of Heaven: The Pahlavis and the Final Days of Imperial Iran is a 2016 book by Andrew Scott Cooper. It documents the Pahlavi family and the overthrow of the Shah of Iran.

Cooper stated that the person who succeeded Pahlavi as Iran's ruler, Ruhollah Khomeini, unfairly tainted Pahlavi's image and that the shah was a "benevolent autocrat". The book's primary audience is the lay public rather than academics. Cooper stated that The Fall of Heaven "is not intended as the final word on Mohammad Reza Shah or the 1979 revolution—far from it".

== Background ==
Andrew Scott Cooper, born in New Zealand, previously worked for Human Rights Watch as a researcher. The author, who does not understand Persian, used declassified documents from the U.S. federal government made around the period of the Shah's overthrow, as well as interviews of members of Pahlavi's government and family, including that of Shahbanou Farah Pahlavi. Brent G., an author of a review of the Center for the Study of Intelligence, Central Intelligence Agency, stated that the book "relied heavily" on these interviews. The family members were in various locations. Cooper stated that interviewers felt more comfortable talking to him since he was not Iranian. Roham Alvandi, an associate professor at the London School of Economics and Political Science stated that his lack of Persian fluency made it easy for his interviewees to manipulate him.

== Content ==
Brent G. stated that the author describes Farah Pahlavi as "a frustrated reformer" in a "flattering portrait" and that according to the book Farah "probably deserves more credit than contemporary observers gave her". Cooper stated a belief that Sayyid Musa Sadr would have been a good leader of Islamic moderates in Iran.

== Reception ==
Alvandi stated that the book is a "refreshingly revisionist account".

Aram Bakshian wrote in the Washington Times that the book "is thoroughly researched and documented" and "is also highly readable and does justice to the tragic grandeur of his subject."

Charmaine Chan of the South China Morning Post ranked the book four of five stars and described it as "a page-turner, especially when it relives the day-by-day events leading to the shah’s flight to exile."

David Holahan of the USA Today ranked the book three and one half of four stars.

Publishers Weekly described it as "a fascinating, distinctive, and personal account of the Shah and his rule."

Jay Freeman of Booklist stated that the book "is a fine revisionist study".

Brent G. concluded that the book "is more nuanced and balanced than most other Shah biographies to date" although he believed it was inferior to The Shah by Abbas Milani. He stated it had "excessive" positive statements about Pahlavi and that sections of the initial chapters "read like a panegyric he might have drafted to convince [members of Pahlavi's family and government] to lend him their time and memories."
