= Abdollah Entezam =

Iranian diplomat

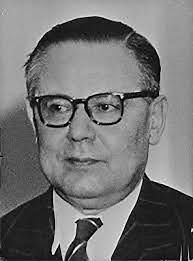
Abdollah Entezam

Abdollah Entezam was an Iranian diplomat (Seyed Abdollah Entezam), son of Seyed Mohamad also known as "Binesh Ali", leader of Safi Ali Shahi order of dervishes in Iran. His father was also a diplomat. Older brother of Nasrollah Entezam, also a career diplomat and Iranian minister of Health (also spelt Nasrullah by Abbas Milani). His son was Hume Horan, US ambassador to Saudi Arabia.

He was born in 1895 in Tehran, Iran, according to Encyclopædia Iranica.

Encyclopædia Iranica says of him: "ʿAbd-Allāh Enteẓām diplomat and politician (b. 1274 Š./1895 in Tehran, d. 2 Farvardīn 1362 Š./22 March 1983 was the eldest son of Khorshidlaqa Ghaffari and Sayyed Moḥammad Entezam-al-Saltaneh.

He was educated in Tehran at the German Technical School, Dar ul-Funun and the School of Political Science. After this he joined the Ministry of Foreign Affairs in 1919 and served as the secretary at the Iranian embassy in Washington, D.C.
While in the United States, he studied mechanical engineering and married an American woman named Margaret Robinson Hume from whom he was subsequently divorced. They had a son, Hume Horan, who later joined the U.S. State Department and became a leading Arabist. In May 1958, he married Farah Ansari, granddaughter of Aliqoli Ansari Mosawer-al-Mamalek, to whom he was vaguely related. Her grandfather had been minister of foreign affairs several times.

== Career: diplomacy and Sufism ==
Abbas Milani in his book on Eminent Persians says: "Both diplomacy and Sufism became inseparable parts of Abdollah’s character and career."

Iran's ambassador to France in 1927,

Presented Iran’s case against Britain to the League of Nations in 1933,

Iran's ambassador to West Germany,

Minister of Finance under Mohammad Reza Shah, then Foreign Minister 1953-56,

Negotiated the resumption of diplomatic relations with Britain and the oil contracts after Mosaddegh.

Chairman of the board of directors and Managing Director of NIOC (National Iranian Oil Company) 1957-63.

Dismissed by the Shah after the uprisings of 1963, for suggesting that the pace of reforms should be slowed down.

Marvin Zonis wrote in The Political Elite of Iran that in June 1963 Hossein Ala the court minister, called together a council of elite statesmen to convey their mounting concern to the Shah, in relation to the extreme response of the military to demonstrations against the arrest of Khomeini.
People were demonstrating peacefully but Iranian troops had shot at the crowd and killed some people. The council of elite statesmen were: Ala himself, Abdollah Entezam, General Morteza Yazdanpanah, & Sardar Fakher Hekmat. After the four officials carried their foreboding to His Majesty, it was reported that the Shah was infuriated. Ala was relieved of his duties as minister of court, Yazdanpanah was dropped from the inspectorate, Hekmat was forbidden to campaign for the parliament & Entezam was retired from the National Iranian Oil Company and sent 'home'.

Entezam then set up an ironmongery workshop from which he earned his living for the next 15 years.
In 1978 the Shah realising his mistake begged him to return and accept the post of Prime Minister but it was too late. Entezam was too old and a revolution was well under way. There was nothing Entezam could do to dissuade the striking oil workers, despite the warm welcome that he received at the now in-turmoil oil company. He advised the Shah to remain in the country and not flee to the West. Once again his advice was not heeded.

== Patronage and freemasonry ==
According to Abbas Milani's The Persian Sphinx, he was the mentor of the Prime Minister Amir-Abbas Hoveida who referred to him as arbab (the boss).

Milani said in The Persian Sphinx (page 115):

"In the mid-1950s when the Shah began to demand absolute obedience from all those around him, and as a token of this submission expected everyone to kiss the royal hand at each audience, Entezam was one of very few people in government who refused to comply."

He was also a Freemason, and in 1960, apparently at his behest, Hoveida (spelt Hoveyda by Milani) joined the Foroughi Lodge, newly created in 1960 with Entezam as its grand master.

In Ismail Raeen's (also spelt Ra'in) book on Freemasonry in Iran, Faramooshkhaneh va Faramasonery dar Iran Vol3, p505, Hoveida is listed as a Freemason and Entezam as the grand master of the Independent Grand Lodge of Iran.

In Religion and politics in modern Iran : a reader, Lloyd V J Ridgeon on p. 150 states that "several Masonic Iranian Lodges connected to the United Grand Lodges of Germany operated from the premises of the Safi Ali Shahi Brotherhood Society in Tehran and Entezam had been a founder member in Tehran since 1960 of one of these, the Mehr Lodge and also guided another, the Safa Lodge, which had been established in 1962 ".

According to Alaeddin Rouhani, Masonic lodges connected to Germany were set up in Iran after WWII because they were not tainted with a history of colonialism and imperialism like the British lodges.

According to Mahmoud Tolooie "although Entezam was a founder member of these Iranian lodges, he gave up on them after the death of Seyed Hassan Taghizadeh in 1970 and did not attend their meetings anymore".

== Sufism ==
Upon the death of his father he became the leader of the Safi Ali Shahi order of dervishes in Iran.

A New Perspective on Mysticism and Sufism: Abdollah Entezam, Introduced and translated by Matthijs van der Bos.

In 1977 Entezam wrote a series of articles entitled ‘A New Perspective on Mysticism and Sufism – Nazari tazeh be erfan va tassavof-. He used the pseudonym ‘I do not know’ (la adri) and the articles reported the question and answer sessions of a Sufi Master. The essays were republished after the revolution by Vahid Publishers, under the pseudonym of Abdollah Azadeh in 1984.

== End of life ==
At the start of the Iranian revolution, in 1978 the 86-year-old Entezam was offered the role of Prime minister by the Shah, but was said to have turned it down on health grounds. Some have said he was imprisoned by the new Islamist regime and released before his death in spring 1983.

His obituary appeared in the Times by Sir Denis Wright on 23 April 1983, in which he said: "Untainted by corruption, he was, in the words of a British ambassador who knew him well, a "man of charm, modesty, and considerable ability, ... spoke excellent English, French, and German, ... shunned high society and lacked ambition but had a great capacity for friendship and was respected by all who knew him. The Shah would never have lost his throne had he listened to and made full use of men such as Abdollah.
