= Hidayah (disambiguation) =

Hidayah is an Arabic word meaning guidance. It is commonly spelled as hidaya, hedaya, and (in its Persian form) hedayat.

Hidayah may also refer to:

- Al-Hidayah, an influential work of Islamic jurisprudence by Burhan al-Din al-Marghinani
- Al Hidayah (organisation)
- Al Hidayah Mosque
- Hidayah (2005 film), an Islamic spiritual television series
- Pintu Hidayah, a 2005 Indonesian soap opera

== See also ==
- Hedayat family
- Hedayat Mosque
- Tafsir Hedayat
