= Morteza Gholi Khan Hedayat =

Iranian politician (1856–1911)

Morteza Gholi Khan Hedayat Sani od-Dowleh
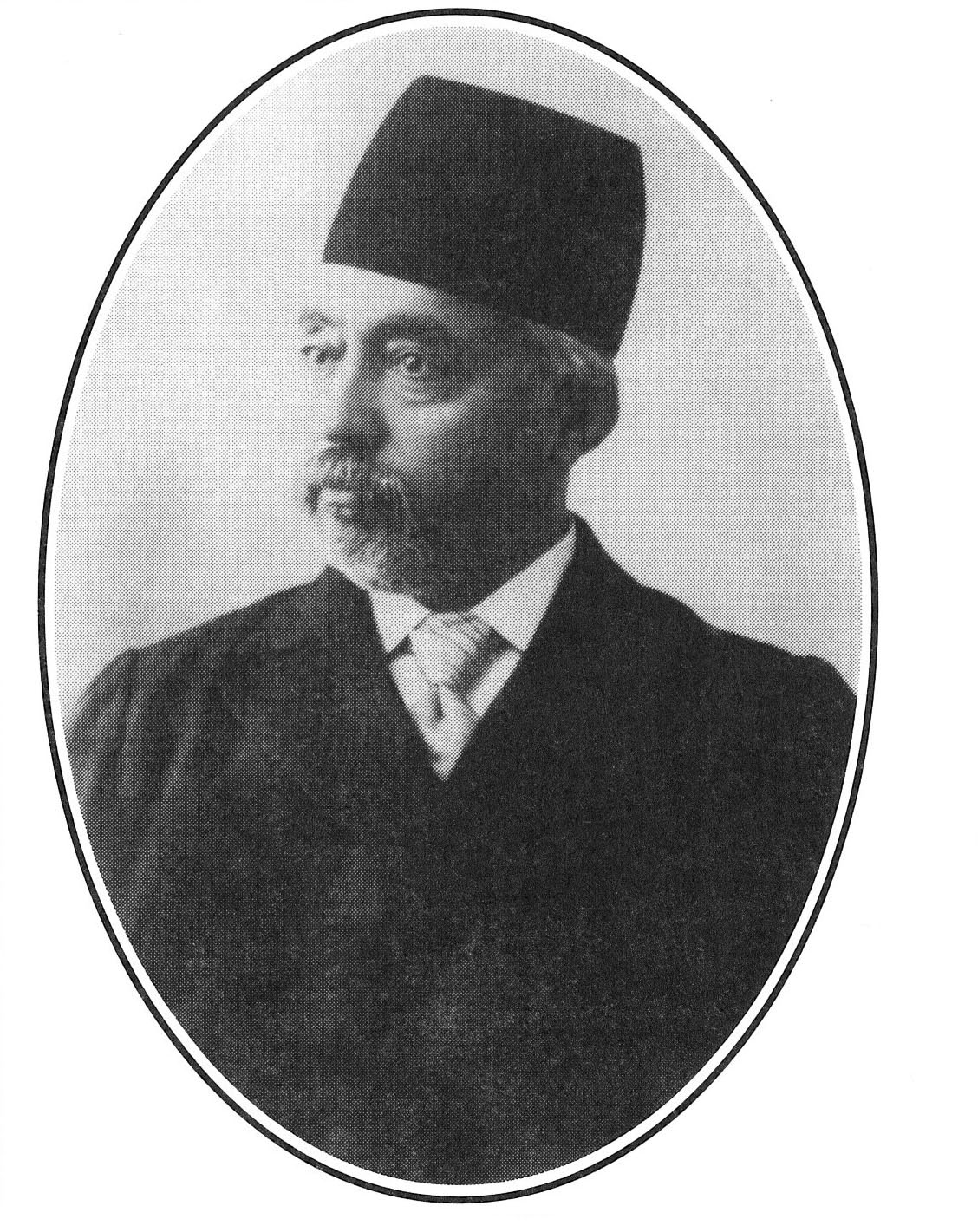

1st Speaker of the Parliament of Iran
- In office 6 October 1906 – 23 June 1907
- Preceded by: First holder
- Succeeded by: Mirza Mahmoud Khan

Personal details
- Born: 1856 Tehran, Sublime State of Iran
- Died: 6 February 1911 (aged 55) Tehran, Sublime State of Iran
- Resting place: Hedayat Mosque
- Party: Moderates
- Spouse: Ehteram as-Saltaneh
- Children: 10

Morteza Gholi Khan Hedayat (Persian: مرتضی‌قلی‌خان هدایت; 1856–1911), also known as Sani od-Dowleh (Persian: صنیع‌الدوله), was a leader of the Persian Constitutional Revolution and the first Chairman of the first Majlis. A member of the Hedayat family, he served as the Minister of Finance of Iran for seven months. He also proposed the creation of Iran's first museum in 1906.

== Life ==
At the turn of the century, Iran was being plundered out of its resources by the British and Russians who had also obtained taxation rights on all significant resources, keeping the county and some of the ruling class under effective financial control. Realizing that a country cannot be independent without self sufficiency and monetary independence, he initiated financial reforms and the overhaul of the taxation system, including bringing in the American adviser William Morgan Shuster. He also proposed the creation of Iran's first museum, the National Museum of Iran. His activities with regards to his financial reforms led to his assassination by the Russians on 6 February 1911. His assassination was conducted by two Georgian nationals in Tehran.
