= Hedaya =

Hedaya may refer to:

- Hidayah (disambiguation), Arabic word meaning "guidance"

== People ==
- Dan Hedaya, American character actor
- Hedaya Malak, Egyptian taekwondo practitioner
- Ovadia Hedaya, leading Israeli rabbi
