= Hovhannes Masehyan =

Iranian Armenian translator and diplomat

Hovhannes Masehian
- Հովհաննես Մասեհյան
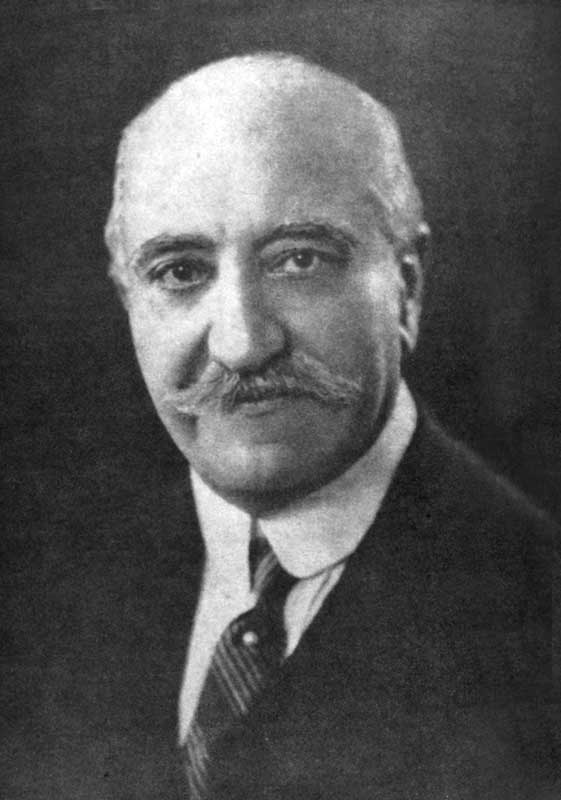

1st Ambassador of Persia to Japan
- In office 1930–1931
- Preceded by: Position created
- Succeeded by: Hassanali Kamal Hedayat

Ambassador of Persia to United Kingdom (Minister Plenipotentiary)
- In office 1927–1929
- Preceded by: Hassan Taqizadeh
- Constituency: Abdul Ali Khan Sadigh-es-Saltaneh

Persian Ambassador to Germany
- Incumbent
- Assumed office 1912

Member National Consultative Majlis
- In office 1927–1927
- Preceded by: vacant
- Succeeded by: Hovsep Mirzaians

Personal details
- Born: 1864 Tehran,
- Died: 1931 (aged 66–67) Harbin,
- Resting place: Cemetery of Surp Minas Chapel, Vanak, Tehran
- Occupation: Politician, Diplomat
- Profession: Translator

Hovhannes Khan Masehian (Armenian: Հովհաննես Խան-Մասեհյան, February 23, 1864 in Tehran - November 19, 1931 in Harbin) was an Iranian Armenian translator and diplomat, well known as the translator of Shakespeare's and Byron's works into Armenian. In 1912, he became the Ambassador of Persia to Germany. From 1927 to 1929 he was the Ambassador of Persia to Great Britain. He was the first Ambassador of Persia in Japan.

Masehian's Armenian translation of Hamlet was printed in 1894 by the Armenian Publishing Society. The contemporary Armenian poets Hovhannes Hovhannisyan and Hovhannes Tumanyan praised this translation in their reviews. According to Gevorg Emin, a later Armenian poet, Masehian's translations are "excellent" and "sound so wonderful in Armenian".

Masehian was the editor of the Armenian journal Shavigh (Tehran, 1894).

As a diplomat, he was responsible for introducing Western political thought and technological innovations into Iran. He was a delegate to the Sixth Majles (the Persian parliament).

After holding the position of ambassador to Great Britain from 1927 to 1929, in 1930 Masehian was appointed ambassador to Japan, but resigned the following year because of severe illness. He died in Harbin while traveling from Tokyo to China. He was mistreated by the Islamic ritual in Harbin, causing the indignation of the local Armenians. The Armenian National Department of Harbin demanded Khan Masehian's coffin. After presenting relevant documents, the board members received the coffin, which was taken to the Armenian church in the presence of the local Armenian community. The funeral ceremony was held in an Armenian restaurant. He was buried in Tehran.

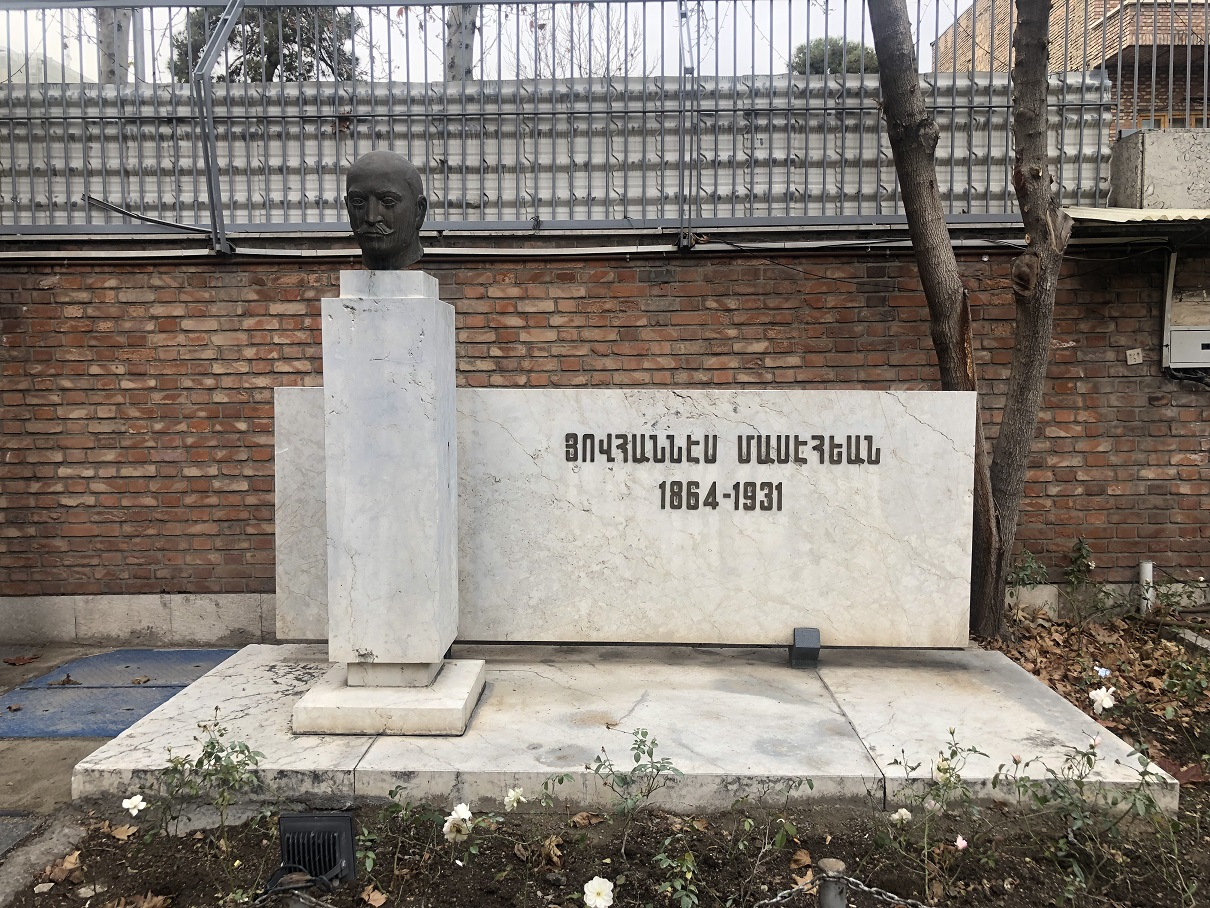
Hovhannes Masehyan in St. Mary Church, Tehran
