= Iran–Uzbekistan relations =

- Iran: Uzbekistan

Iran and Uzbekistan share deep cultural and historical ties. Both countries are members of the Economic Cooperation Organization (ECO).

== Historical importance ==
Iran is an Islamic theocracy, while Uzbekistan is a secular presidential defective democracy. The two nations have been apprehensive on their difference of politics, but still have been active in improving their relations. They also have ancient cultural ties with each other, with Uzbekistan being a part of ancient Persia, as Sogdia and Bactria were considered parts of Greater Iran.

The Timurid Empire, founded by the Karluk Timur and glorified as national hero of Uzbekistan today, once ruled a massive empire that included Iran, and the name of his state was "Iran-o-Turan", reflecting this deeply intertwined relations. The Timurid dynasty later on survived in India as the Mughal Empire, where they had developed extensive relations with the Persians. At the same time, the Uzbek khanates of Central Asia, originally Kipchak Shaybanids, underwent massive Uzbekisation after seizing control from the Timurids at the 16th century, and by the 17th century, they were entirely Karlukified and even took on Persian titles, norms in their cultures, and even proclaimed themselves heirs of Timurid culture and heritage in response.

== Trade ==
Iran and Uzbekistan have signed bilateral agreements to cooperate in various fields including, agriculture, transport, oil and gas production, construction, pharmaceuticals, and banking. The two nations have also worked on overland links and other joint ventures.

Uzbekistan exports many commodities to Iran including cotton, ferrous and non-ferrous metals, fertilizers, and chemical fibers. Iran exports construction materials, detergents, foods, tea, and fruits to Uzbekistan. The Iranian-Uzbekistan trade turnover exceeded $600 million in 2008.

In 2018, Uzbekistan's ambassador to Iran stated that they intend to increase their trade volume with Iran, by expanding bilateral ties and enhancing cooperation with Iran, according to Mehr News.

In February 2025, the $400 transit fee for each entry of the two side cargo vehicles was mutually canceled.

== Resident diplomatic missions ==
- Iran has an embassy in Tashkent.
- Uzbekistan has an embassy in Tehran.

== See also ==
- List of ambassadors of Iran to Uzbekistan
- Foreign relations of Iran
- Foreign relations of Uzbekistan
