= First Majles =

1st term of the Iranian Majles

1st National Consultative Assembly
2nd	→
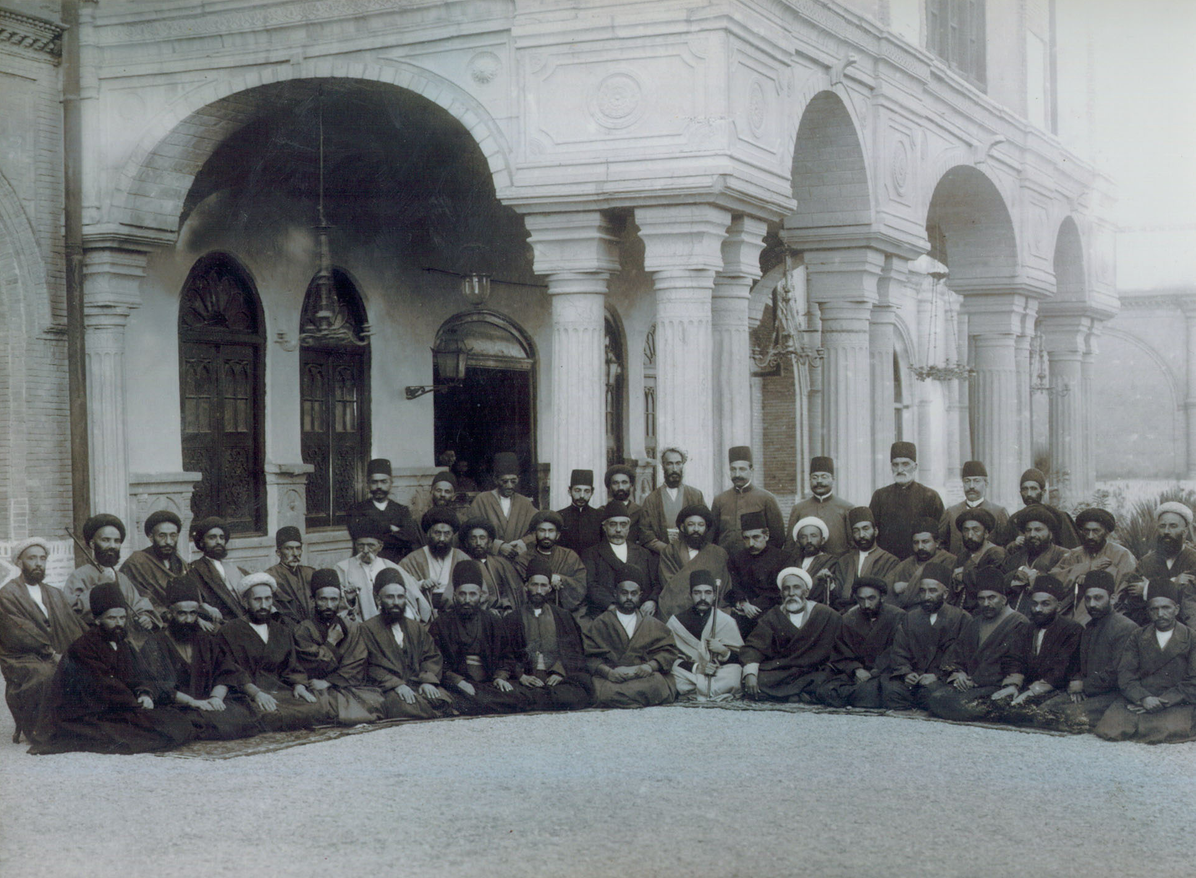
- Members of the First Majles

Overview
- Jurisdiction: Sublime State of Iran
- Meeting place: Baharestan
- Term: 7 October 1906 – 23 June 1908
- Election: 1906

National Consultative Assembly
- Members: 160
- Speaker: Morteza Gholi Khan Hedayat

The First Majles was a national legislative assembly from 7 October 1906, to 23 June 1908. This was the result of the constitutional movement emerging in Iran, opposing growing foreign influence, and aiming at limiting the Shah's power.The ruling Shah when the Assembly first opened was Mozaffar ad-Din Shah Qajar.

The main result of the First Majles was the 1906 constitution, limiting the shah's authority, and conditioning foreign concessions to the newly established Parliament's approval

Mozaffar's son and successor, Mohammad Ali Shah Qajar, became Shah on 21 January 1907. He was against the constitution that was ratified during the reign of his father. In 1907, Mohammad Ali dissolved the Majles (Iranian parliament/National assembly) and declared the Constitution abolished because it was contrary to Islamic law. On 23 June 1908, the Shah bombarded the Majles with the military and political support of Russia and Britain.

Morteza Gholi Khan Hedayat was the first Chairman of the period. According to W. Morgan Shuster, "Five days later [measured from February 1st] the Persian Minister of Finance, Saniu'd-Dawleh was shot and killed in the streets of Tehran by two Georgians, who also succeeded in wounding four of the Persian police before they were captured. The Russian consular authorities promptly refused to allow these men to be tried by the Persian Government, and took them out of the country under Russian protection, claiming that they would be suitably punished".

== Prime ministers ==
- Mirza Nasrullah Khan 1 August 1906 – 17 March 1907, Constitutional Movement
- Mirza Ali Asghar Khan Amin al-Soltan (1 May 1907 – 31 August 1907)(assassinated), Independent
- Mohammad Vali Khan Khalatbari Tonekaboni (1st Term) 13 September 1907 – 21 December 1907, Constitutional Movement
- Hossein-Qoli Nezam al-Saltaneh Mafi, 21 December 1907 – 21 May 1908, Justice Party
- Morteza-Gholi Khan Hedayat, 21 May 1908 – 7 June 1908, Constitutional Movement

== See also ==
- Persian Constitution of 1906
- Persian Constitutional Revolution
