= Iraj Masjedi =

Iranian military personnel

Sardar Iraj Masjedi
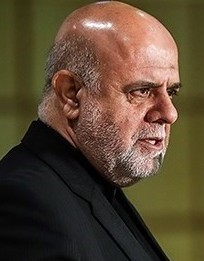

Ambassador of Iran to Iraq
- In office 18 April 2017 – 11 April 2022
- President: Hassan Rouhani Ebrahim Raisi
- Preceded by: Hassan Danaeifar
- Succeeded by: Mohammad-Kazem Ale-Sadegh

Personal details
- Born: 1956 or 1957 (age 69–70) Khuzestan, Iran

Military service
- Allegiance: Iran
- Branch/service: Revolutionary Guards
- Years of service: 1982–2017
- Rank: Brigadier general
- Unit: Quds Force
- Commands: Quds Base; Ramazan Base
- Battles/wars: Iran–Iraq War; Iraqi insurgency (2003–11)

Iraj Masjedi (Persian: ایرج مسجدی) was the former Iranian ambassador to Iraq, having previously served in the Revolutionary Guards for 35 years. A veteran of Iran–Iraq War, Masjedi was a senior Quds Force commander and served as a top advisor to Qasem Soleimani. He was designated as the ambassador to Iraq in January 2017 and assumed office in April 2017. On October 22, 2020, the U.S. designated Masjedi under Executive Order 13224, imposing sanctions on him “for acting for or on behalf of the IRGC-QF.“

Diplomatic posts
Preceded by Hassan Danaeifar	Iranian Ambassador to Iraq; 2017–present	Incumbent
