= Abbas Mousavi =

Iranian diplomat

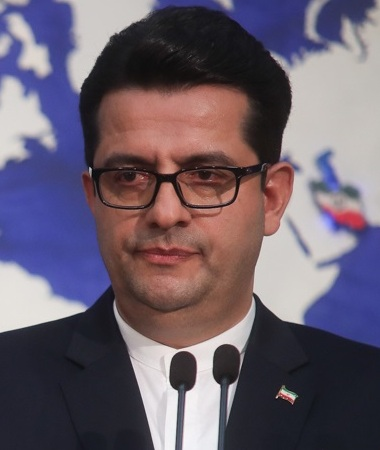

Ambassador of Iran to Azerbaijan
- In office 15 August 2020 – 20 May 2024
- President: Hassan Rouhani Ebrahim Raisi
- Preceded by: Javad Jahangirzadeh
- Succeeded by: Mojtaba Demirchilu

Spokesperson for the Ministry of Foreign Affairs of Iran
- In office 12 April 2019 – 16 August 2020
- President: Hassan Rouhani
- Preceded by: Bahram Ghasemi
- Succeeded by: Saeed Khatibzadeh

Personal details
- Born: 29 May 1971 (age 55) Moallem Kola, Mahmudabad, Mazandaran, Iran

Abbas Mousavi (Persian: سید عباس موسوی) is an Iranian career diplomat and acting Deputy of Political Affairs of the President's Office since 2026. He was spokesman for the Ministry of Foreign Affairs of Iran from 2019 to 2020. In August 2020, he was appointed as an ambassador of Iran to Azerbaijan. He was dismissed from the role in 2024, reportedly for attending an interview with an unveiled woman.
