= Mahmoud Alamir =

Iranian diplomat and politician (1863–1936)

Mahmoud Alamir Ehtesham os-Saltaneh
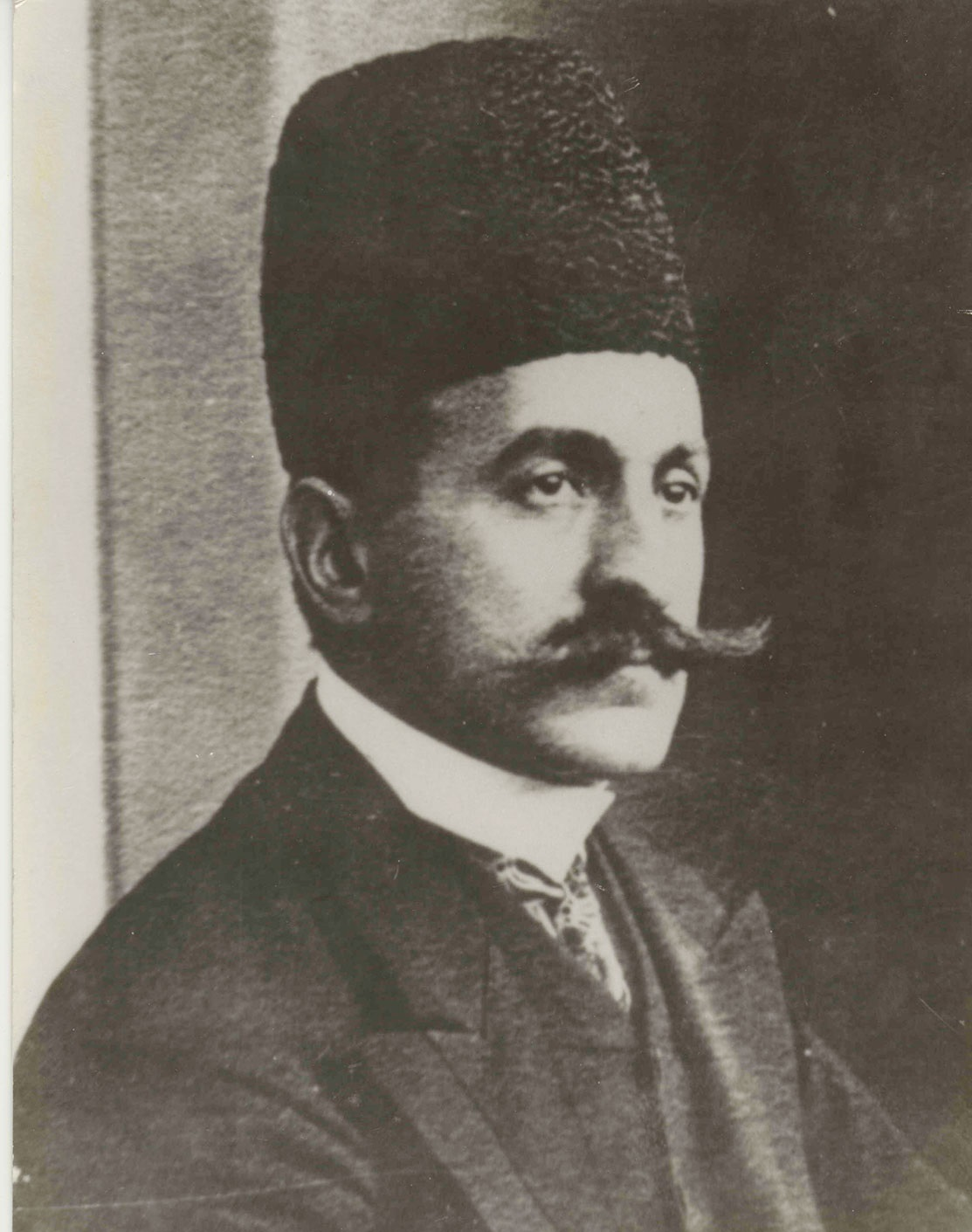

2nd Speaker of the Parliament of Iran
- In office 10 September 1907 – 28 March 1908
- Preceded by: Morteza Hedayat
- Succeeded by: Esmail Momtaz

Member of Parliament
- In office 6 December 1914 – 13 November 1915
- In office 15 November 1909 – 25 December 1911
- In office 7 October 1906 – 23 June 1908

Iranian ambassador to the Ottoman Empire
- In office September 1910 – September 1919
- Monarch: Ahmad Shah Qajar

Iranian envoy to the German Empire
- In office February 1910 – September 1910
- Monarch: Ahmad Shah Qajar
- In office March 1908 – August 1908
- Monarch: Mohammad Ali Shah Qajar
- In office June 1901 – December 1905
- Monarch: Mozaffar ad-Din Shah Qajar

Vali of Kurdistan
- In office 1898–1901
- Monarch: Mozaffar ad-Din Shah Qajar

Vali of Zanjan
- In office 1889–1891
- Monarch: Naser al-Din Shah Qajar

Personal details
- Born: Mīrzā Maḥmūd ʿAlāmīr Qajar; 27 January 1863 Tehran, Sublime State of Iran
- Died: 26 January 1936 (aged 72) Tehran, Imperial State of Iran
- Parent: Mohammad Rahim Khan Ala ad-Dowleh (father)
- Occupation: Diplomat

Maḥmūd ʿAlāmīr (Persian: محمود علامیر), also known as Masʿūd Davallū (Persian: مسعود دولّو) and by the bestowed title Ehtesham os-Saltaneh (Persian: احتشام‌السلطنه) was a Qajar nobleman, diplomat and constitutionalist politician.
