= List of ambassadors of Iran to Indonesia =

Coordinates: 6.200478°S 106.827782°E

Ambassador of Iran to Indonesia
- Duta Besar Republik Islam Iran untuk Indonesia
- Coat of Arms of Iran
- Incumbent; Mohammad Boroujerdi since September 20, 2023
- Inaugural holder: Abdolahad Yekta
- Formation: May 1, 1951

The Iranian ambassador in Jakarta is the official representative of the Government in Tehran to the Government of Indonesia.

== List of representatives ==
Diplomatic accreditation	Diplomatic accreditation Solar Hijri calendar	Ambassador	Persian language	Observations	List of heads of state of Iran	List of presidents of Indonesia	Term end	Term end Solar Hijri calendar
May 1, 1951	1330	Abdolahad Yekta	Persian: عبدالاحد یکتا	Chargé d'affaires (A).	Mohammad Reza Shah Pahlavi	Sukarno	January 1, 1952	1330
1952	1330			From 1952 to 1959 the Iranian ambassador to India was concurrently accredited in Jakarta.	Mohammad Reza Shah Pahlavi	Sukarno	1957	1335
March 6, 1957	1335	Abdol-Hossein Sadiq-Esfandiari (de)	Persian: عبدالحسین صدیق اسفندیاری	Abdol-Hossein Esfandiari, Sadiq ol-Molk, In 1962 he became Iranian ambassador to Thailand.	Mohammad Reza Shah Pahlavi	Sukarno	December 1, 1961	1340
December 1, 1961	1340	Javad Qadimi	Persian: جواد قدیمی	(Amirkabir)	Mohammad Reza Shah Pahlavi	Sukarno		
November 1, 1969	1348	Bahman Ahanin	Persian: بهمن آهنین	THE NEW AMBASSADOR TO INDONESIA, Bahman Ahanin, is expected to leave for Jakarta in November.,,, 1974: today conferred the Indonesian Government's "Bintang Jasa Utama" medal on Iranian Ambassador (Bahman Ahanin) in recognition of his services	Mohammad Reza Shah Pahlavi	Suharto	1974	1353
1974	1353	Gholamali Vahid-Mazandarani	Persian: غلامعلی وحید مازندرانی	1972: Indonesia and Australia	Mohammad Reza Shah Pahlavi	Suharto	August 1, 1976	1355
August 1, 1976	1355	Mohammad-Ali Shokouhian	Persian: محمدعلی شکوهیان	ambassador Mohammad-Ali Shekuhian	Mohammad Reza Shah Pahlavi	Hamengkubuwono IX	September 17, 1978	1357
September 17, 1978	1357	Parviz Safinia	Persian: پرویز صفی‌نیا	(1925)	Mohammad Reza Shah Pahlavi	Adam Malik	January 1, 1979	1357
January 1, 1979	1357	Mahmoud Kamyabipour	Persian: محمود کامیابی‌پور	Acting Ambassador and Charge d'affair under Safinia	Mohammad Reza Shah Pahlavi	Adam Malik	August 1, 1981	1360
March 16, 1983	1361	Abdol-Azim Hashemi Nik	Persian: عبدالعظیم هاشمی نیک		Ali Khamenei	Umar Wirahadikusumah	1986	1365
1986	1365	Hossein Mirfakhar	Persian: حسین میرفخار		Ali Khamenei	Umar Wirahadikusumah	1990	1369
1992	1371	Ali Asghar Khaji (de)	Persian: علی‌اصغر خاجی	'Ali Asghar Qoreyshi Kahangi	Akbar Hashemi Rafsanjani	Try Sutrisno	1997	1376
1997	1376	Mohsen Nabavi	Persian: محسن نبوی		Mohammad Khatami	Try Sutrisno	2000	1379
2000	1379	Abdollah Zifan	Persian: عبدالله ذیفن		Mohammad Khatami	Abdurrahman Wahid	2003	1382
2004	1382	Shaban Shahidi Moaddab	Persian: شعبان شهیدی مؤدب		Mohammad Khatami	Susilo Bambang Yudhoyono	2006	1384
2008	1386	Behrouz Kamalvandi (fa)	Persian: بهروز کمالوندی	Behrooz Kamalvandi	Mahmoud Ahmadinejad	Susilo Bambang Yudhoyono	2010	1389
March 1, 2010	1388	Mohammad Farazandeh	Persian: محمود فرازنده	Iranian Ambassador to Indonesia Mahmoud Farazandeh said that he Duta besar Iran untuk Indonesia Muhammad Farazandeh	Mahmoud Ahmadinejad	Susilo Bambang Yudhoyono	2014	1393
March 21, 2015	1394	Valiollah Mohammadi Nasrabadi	Persian: ولی‌الله محمدی نصرآبادی		Hassan Rouhani	Joko Widodo	2019	1398
November 20, 2019	1398	Mohammad Khosh Heikal Azad	Persian: محمد خوش‌هیکل آزاد		Hassan Rouhani	Joko Widodo	2023	1402
September 20, 2023	1402	Mohammad Boroujerdi	Persian: محمد بروجردی		Ebrahim Raisi	Joko Widodo		
