= List of ambassadors of Iran to Germany =

Ambassador of Iran to Germany
- Persian: سفیر ایران در آلمان
- Coat of Arms of Iran

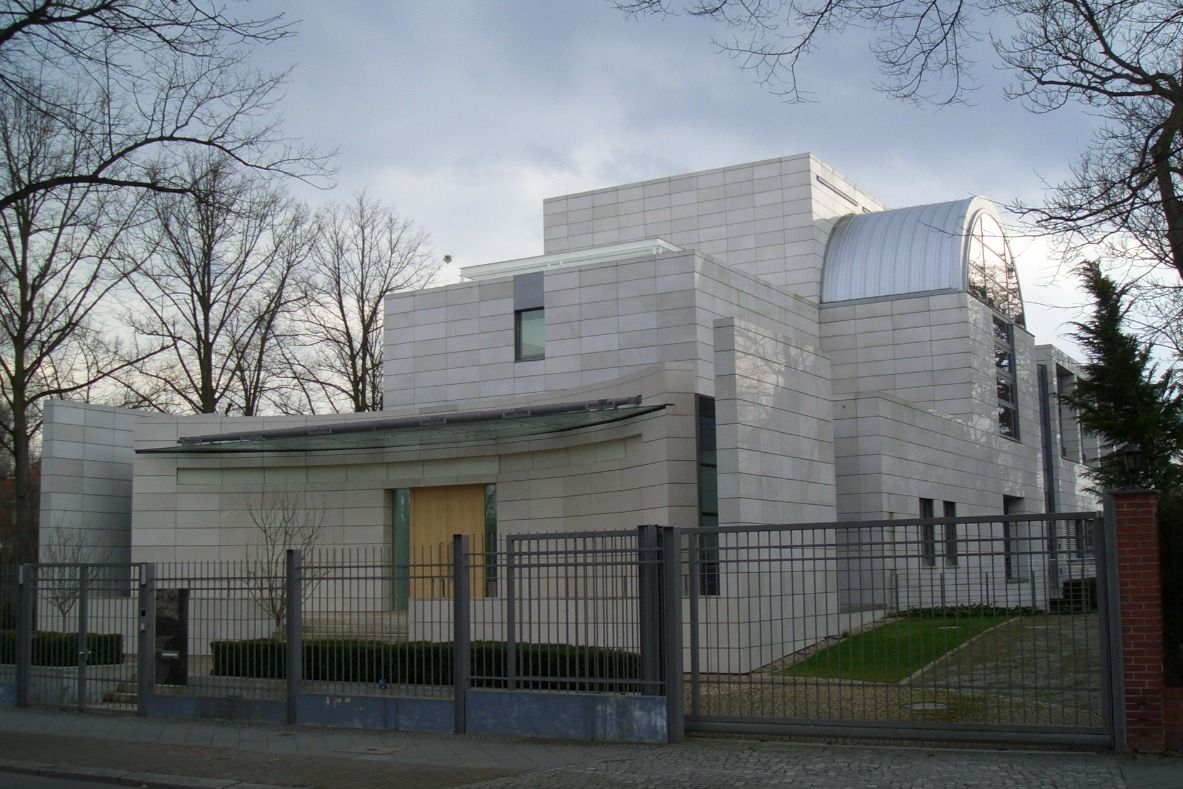
- Incumbent; Majid Nili Ahmadabadi since March 24, 2025
- Inaugural holder: Reza Khan Geranmayeh Moayyed os-Saltaneh (de)
- Formation: 1885

The Iranian ambassador in Berlin is the official representative of the Government in Tehran to the Federal Government of Germany.

== List of representatives ==
Diplomatic Accreditation	Diplomatic Accreditation (Solar Hijri calendar)	Ambassador	Persian language	Observations	List of Heads of Governments of Iran	List of Heads of Governments of Germany	Term End	Term End (Solar Hijri calendar)
1885	1264	Reza Khan Geranmayeh Moayyed os-Saltaneh (de)	Persian: رضا خان مؤیدالسلطنه	Ambassador. Establishing diplomatic relations	Naser al-Din Shah Qajar	Wilhelm I	1901	1280
1901	1280	Mahmoud Khan Alamir Ehtesham os-Saltaneh	Persian: محمود خان علامیر احتشام‌السلطنه	Ambassador	Mozaffar ad-Din Shah Qajar	Wilhelm II	1906	1285
1906	1285	Hovhannes Khan Masehian Mosaed os-Saltaneh	Armenian: Յովհաննէս Մասեհեան	Chargé d'affaires and then Ambassador	Mozaffar ad-Din Shah Qajar	Wilhelm II	1910	1288
1910	1289	Mahmoud Khan Alamir Ehtesham os-Saltaneh	Persian: محمود خان علامیر احتشام‌السلطنه	Ambassador	Ahmad Shah Qajar	Wilhelm II	1911	1290
1911	1290	Hovhannes Khan Masehian Mosaed os-Saltaneh	Armenian: Յովհաննէս Մասեհեան	Ambassador	Ahmad Shah Qajar	Wilhelm II	1915	1294
1916	1295	Hussein Kuli Khan Nawab	Persian: حسینقلی خان نواب	Ambassador	Ahmad Shah Qajar	Wilhelm II	1920	1299
1920	1299	Abdol-Ali Khan Sadri Sadigh os-Saltaneh (de)	Persian: عبدالعلی خان صدیق‌السلطنه	Ambassador	Ahmad Shah Qajar	Friedrich Ebert	1921	1300
1921	1300	Hovhannes Khan Masehian Mosaed os-Saltaneh	Armenian: Յովհաննէս Մասեհեան	Ambassador	Ahmad Shah Qajar	Friedrich Ebert	1927	1306
1930	1309	Mohammad-Ali Farzin '(fa)	Persian: محمدعلی فرزین	Ambassador	Reza Shah Pahlavi	Paul von Hindenburg	1932	1310
1932	1310	Enayatollah Samiei Modabber od-Dowleh '(fa)	Persian: عنایت‌الله سمیعی	Ambassador	Reza Shah Pahlavi	Paul von Hindenburg	1933	1312
1933	1312	Abolqasem Najm Najm ol-Molk	Persian: ابوالقاسم نجم	Ambassador	Reza Shah Pahlavi	Paul von Hindenburg	1935	1314
1935	1314	Mohsen Rais	Persian: محسن رئیس	Ambassador	Reza Shah Pahlavi	Adolf Hitler	1937	1316
1937	1316	Nader Arasteh (de)	Persian: نادر آراسته	Ambassador	Reza Shah Pahlavi	Adolf Hitler	1939	1318
1939	1318	Mousa Nouri Esfandiari	Persian: موسی نوری اسفندیاری	Ambassador	Reza Shah Pahlavi	Adolf Hitler	1941	1320
1941	1320			Break in relations			1945	1324
1946	1325	Abdollah Entezam	Persian: عبدالله انتظام	Ambassador	Mohammad Reza Shah Pahlavi	Theodor Heuss	1951	1330
1951	1330	Khalil Esfandiari	Persian: خلیل اسفندیاری	Ambassador	Mohammad Reza Shah Pahlavi	Theodor Heuss	1961	1340
1961	1340	Amir-Khosrow Afshar	Persian: امیرخسرو افشار قاسملو	Ambassador	Mohammad Reza Shah Pahlavi	Heinrich Lübke	1963	1342
1963	1342	Ali-Qoli Ardalan	Persian: علیقلی اردلان	Ambassador	Mohammad Reza Shah Pahlavi	Heinrich Lübke	1965	1344
1965	1344	Mozaffar Malek (de)	Persian: مظفر مالک	Ambassador	Mohammad Reza Shah Pahlavi	Heinrich Lübke	1970	1349
1971	1349	Hossein-Ali Loghman-Adham	Persian: حسینعلی لقمان ادهم	Ambassador	Mohammad Reza Shah Pahlavi	Gustav Heinemann	1973	1352
1973	1352	Amir-Aslan Afshar (de)	Persian: امیراصلان افشار قاسملو	Ambassador	Mohammad Reza Shah Pahlavi	Heinrich Lübke	1977	1356
1977	1356	Houshang Amir-Mokri	Persian: هوشنگ امیرمکری	Ambassador	Mohammad Reza Shah Pahlavi	Walter Scheel	1978	1357
1978	1357	Mir Sadegh Sadrieh	Persian: میرصادق صدریه	Ambassador	Mohammad Reza Shah Pahlavi	Walter Scheel	1979	1357
1979	1358	Mohammad-Mahdi Navvab Motlagh	Persian: محمدمهدی نواب مطلق	Ambassador	Interim Government of Iran	Karl Carstens	1983	1362
1983	1362	Mohammad-Javad Salari	Persian: محمدجواد سالاری	Ambassador	Ali Khamenei	Karl Carstens	1987	1366
1987	1366	Mehdi Mostafavi Ahari	Persian: مهدی مصطفوی اهری	Ambassador	Ali Khamenei	Richard von Weizsäcker	1990	1369
1990	1369	Hossein Mousavian	Persian: امیرحسین موسویان	Ambassador	Akbar Hashemi Rafsanjani	Richard von Weizsäcker	1997	1376
1997	1376	Ahmad Azizi	Persian: احمد عزیزی	Ambassador	Mohammad Khatami	Roman Herzog	2002	1381
2002	1381	Shamseddin Khareghani (de)	Persian: شمس‌الدین خارقانی	Ambassador	Mohammad Khatami	Johannes Rau	2005	1384
2006	1385	Mohammad-Mehdi Akhoundzadeh (de)	Persian: محمدمهدی آخوندزاده	Ambassador	Mahmoud Ahmadinejad	Horst Köhler	2008	1387
2008	1387	Ali-Reza Sheikh-Attar	Persian: علیرضا شیخ عطار	Ambassador	Mahmoud Ahmadinejad	Horst Köhler	2014	1393
2014	1393	Ali Majedi (fa)	Persian: علی ماجدی	Ambassador	Hassan Rouhani	Joachim Gauck	2018	1397
2019	1398	Mahmoud Farazandeh	Persian: محمود فرازنده	Ambassador	Hassan Rouhani	Frank-Walter Steinmeier	2025	1403
March 24, 2025	1404	Majid Nili Ahmadabadi	Persian: مجید نیلی احمدآبادی	Ambassador	Masoud Pezeshkian	Frank-Walter Steinmeier		

== See also ==
- List of ambassadors to Germany
- Germany–Iran relations
