= The Oil Kings =

2011 non-fiction book by Andrew Scott Cooper

The Oil Kings: How the U.S., Iran, and Saudi Arabia Changed the Balance of Power in the Middle East
- First edition
- Author: Andrew Scott Cooper
- Publisher: Simon and Schuster
- Followed by: The Fall of Heaven: The Pahlavis and the Final Days of Imperial Iran

The Oil Kings: How the U.S., Iran, and Saudi Arabia Changed the Balance of Power in the Middle East is a 2011 book by Andrew Scott Cooper, published by Simon and Schuster. It documents the relationships between the United States, Iran, and Saudi Arabia in the mid-20th century energy industry.

The book discusses Henry Kissinger, the 1970s oil embargo, and the Iranian Revolution. Cooper had stated that the story on how the U.S. became dependent on Saudi Arabia and how U.S. reliance on oil began was "Less well known" compared to the general understanding of U.S. reliance on oil.

Brian Black, a history and environmental studies teacher at Pennsylvania State University, stated in the Christian Science Monitor that the book is "a record that adds significant insight to one of the most important periods in the American relationship with petroleum."

== Background ==
Cooper used several sources that, until shortly before the book's publication, had been classified information.

== Content ==
The beginning shows how Richard Nixon met Mohammad Reza Pahlavi, the Shah of Iran, at the funeral of former U.S. president Dwight D. Eisenhower. Initially the U.S. and Iran enjoyed a close relationship, but during the 1970s oil embargo Iran insisted on keeping oil prices high, so the US switched to using Saudi Arabia as its primary ally. Iran's economy experienced significant problems after the Saudis modified production to decrease oil prices. According to Black, "Oil Kings" follows the model of the film "Syrianna" [sic] in portraying the back-channel politics that control the flow of oil and the global politics that emanate from that dynamic."

The Oil Kings details Nixon and Pahlavi in particular. Black states that the book has relatively little documentation.

== Reception ==
Christian Emery of the London School of Economics stated that the book has "prescient and often compelling" analysis and "is well-written", concluding that it is "a serious and significant contribution to the existing scholarship" even though the author "slightly overstates his case". Emery argued that the analysis in the change of relationship between the US and the Middle Eastern oil producers in the 1970s is "quite narrow".

Brandon Wolfe-Hunnicutt stated in a review for the International Journal of Middle East Studies that the book is "an intriguing narrative that should capture the attention of specialists and nonspecialists alike."

Black states that the book "excels" due to the quality of its original research as well as "discipline" and "virtue of focus".

Joan Oleck, a freelance writer in New York, wrote in an article for The National, a newspaper in Abu Dhabi, that she had a positive impression of the book. She stated that at times the author used more content than necessary, such as too many quotes.

Publishers Weekly stated that the book is "both a vivid study in sycophancy and backstabbing and a shrewd critique of Kissingerian geo-strategy."

Kirkus Reviews stated that the book was "A revelatory, impressive debut."
