= Javad Jahangirzadeh =

Iranian politician

Javad Jahanghirzadeh
- جواد جهانگیرزاده
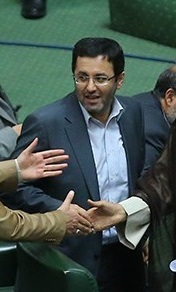

Iranian ambassador to Azerbaijan
- In office 28 August 2016 – 15 August 2020
- President: Hassan Rouhani
- Preceded by: Mohsen Pakaeein
- Succeeded by: Abbas Mousavi

Member of the Islamic Consultative Assembly
- In office 28 May 2004 – 28 May 2016
- Constituency: Urmia
- Majority: 108,133 (27.71%)

Deputy President of the Majlis Research Center
- In office 19 June 2012 – 28 May 2016
- President: Kazem Jalali

Personal details
- Born: August 11, 1966 (age 60) Urmia, Iran
- Party: Iranian Conservative
- Children: 2
- Education: PHD from Allameh Tabatabaei University

Javad Jahanghirzadeh (Persian: ‌جواد جهانگیرزاده; born 11 August 1966) is an Iranian politician.

Jahanghirzadeh was born in Urmia, West Azerbaijan. He is a member of the 7th, 8th and 9th Islamic Consultative Assembly from the electorate of Urmia with Nader Ghazipour and Abed Fattahi. He is member of Iran-China Friendship society and parliamentary relations committee between Iran and EU Jahanghirzadeh won with 108,133 (27.71%) votes. Currently he is the ambassador of Iran to the Republic of Azerbaijan.
