= List of ambassadors of Iran to Uzbekistan =

Coordinates: 41.316815°N 69.314827°E

Ambassador of Iran to Uzbekistan
- Persian: سفیر جمهوری اسلامی ایران در ازبکستان
- Coat of Arms of Iran
- Incumbent; Mohammad Ali Eskandari since October 19, 2023
- Inaugural holder: Mohammad Musa Hashemi-Golpayegani
- Formation: August 1, 1992

The Iranian ambassador in Tashkent is the official representative of the Government in Tehran to the Government of Uzbekistan.

== List of representatives ==
Diplomatic accreditation	Diplomatic accreditation Solar Hijri calendar	Ambassador	Persian language	Observations	List of presidents of Iran	List of leaders of Uzbekistan	Term end	Term end Solar Hijri calendar
August 1, 1992	1370	Mohammad Musa Hashemi-Golpayegani	Persian: سید محمدموسی هاشمی گلپایگانی		Akbar Hashemi Rafsanjani	Islam Karimov	1996	1374
September 1, 1995	1374	Mohsen Pak Ayin	Persian: محسن پاک‌آیین	(* 1955 in the Fasa County (Fars province)): He studied political science and is a professor in English.; Publications: "Political Change in Africa"; In 1982 he entered the foreign service.; From 1986 to 1988 he was Deputy head of the Far East Bureau.; In 1989 he was deputy director of the Office of the United States.; From 1989 to 1994 he was Iranian ambassador to Zambia.; In 1996 he was Advisor to the Minister for African Affairs and Chair of the African Studies Department.; From 1996 to 1999 he was Iranian ambassador to Uzbekistan.; From 1999 to he was Chief of the First East Asian Bureau.; From 2005 to 2008 he was Iranian ambassador to Thailand.; In 2011 he was Deputy of Culture of Islamic Culture and Communication Organization and Chief of Staff of Uzbekistan.; Since September 1, 2012 he is Iranian ambassador to Azerbaijan.; He is deputy director of the Office for the Preservation and Publication of Works of the Supreme Leader of the Islamic Republic of Iran.	Akbar Hashemi Rafsanjani Alī Akbar Hāschemī Rafsandschānī	Islam Karimov	2000	1378
2000	1378	Hossein Naragian	Persian: حسین نراقیان	Hossein Naraghian	Mohammad Khatami	Islam Karimov	2004	1382
2004	1382	Mohammad Fathali	Persian: محمد فتحعلی	(* 1966). Since October 18, 2017 he is Iranian ambassador to Lebanon.	Mohammad Khatami	Islam Karimov	2009	1387
May 4, 2008		Mohammad Keshavarzadeh	Persian: محمد کشاورززاده	From April 1997 to 2002 he was Iranian ambassador to Venezuela.	Mahmoud Ahmadinejad	Islam Karimov		
2013	1391	Ali Mardan Fard	Persian: علی مردانی‌فر		Hassan Rouhani	Islam Karimov	2016	1394
December 10, 2015	1394	Bahman Agharazi Dormani	Persian: بهمن آقارضی درمنی	(*1966 in Tehran): Degrees: Master of Islamic Studies and Political Science.; He obtained an PhD in strategic management.; From 1997 to 1992 he was Head of the Office of Research Affairs, Department of Communications.; From 2000 to 1997 he was Consul General in Peshawar.; From 2002 to 2000 he was Deputy General Directorate of the Commonwealth Office.; From 2002 to 2004 he was Secretary of the Secretariat of the Caspian Sea.; From 2009 to 2004 he was Iranian ambassador to Uzbekistan.; From 2014 to 2010 he was Member of the Central Election Center of the Ministry of Foreign Affairs.; From 2010 to 2009 he was Adviser to the Secretary of State.; From 2014 to 2011 he was member of the council for the establishment and support of Islamist seats in universities abroad.; From 2014 to 2013 he was Member of the State Committee for Strategic Studies.; From 2015 to 2010 he was Special Assistant to the Minister for Strategic Affairs.; Research: * The Importance of the Continental Field in the Future of International Relations.; The Impact of Oil on Economic Development of the Islamic Republic of Iran.; Explaining the Influence of Communication Technology on Diplomacy.; Explaining the Strategic Strategic Goals of the Islamic Republic of Iran.; The Cultural and Social Components Influencing Islamic Awakening and its Effects on the International Environment.	Hassan Rouhani	Nigmatilla Yuldashev	2019	1398
October 21, 2019	1398	Hamid Nayyerabadi	Persian: حمید نیرآبادی		Hassan Rouhani	Shavkat Mirziyoyev	2023	1402
October 19, 2023	1402	Mohammad Ali Eskandari	Persian: محمدعلی اسکندری		Ebrahim Raisi	Shavkat Mirziyoyev		

== See also ==
- Uzbekistan–Iran relations
