= Hedayat =

The surname Hedayat is used by different families of Middle East origins. In Iran when referring to that family name without further specification, it mostly refers to one prominent family originating from Mazanderan in Northern Iran. Notable people from this family include:

- Abdollah Hedayat (1899-1968), Iranian army general
- Ali Qoli Khan Mokhber od-Dowleh I (1830–1897), Minister of Education, Post and Telegraphs
- Jafar Qoli Khan Nayyer-ol-Molk I (1831–1913), Minister of Education
- Hassan Ali Khan Kamal-Hedayat, Nasr-ol Molk (1877–1957), Minister of Post and Telegraph
- Mehdi Qoli Khan Hedayat, Mokhber-ol Saltaneh (1864–1955), Prime Minister of Iran
- Mohammed Qoli Khan Hedayat, Mokhber-ol Molk (1865–1950), Minister of Finances
- Morteza Gholi Khan Hedayat (1856–1911), President of the 1st Majles
- Reza-Qoli Khan Hedayat (1800–1871), a Persian writer and poet
- Reza Qoli Khan Hedayat, Nayer-ol Molk II (1872–1945), Minister of Education
- Sadegh Hedayat (1903–1951), Iranian writer

== Other people with the surname ==
- Bahareh Hedayat (born 1981), Iranian student activist
- Habibollah Hedayat (1917–2013), Iranian nutritionist
- Nelufar Hedayat (born 1988), Afghanistan-born journalist and presenter

== See also ==
- Hedayat Mosque, mosque in Tehran, Iran
