= The Persian Sphinx =

Political biography of Abbas Hoveyda

- Author: Abbas Milani
- Language: English; Persian
- Genre: Political biography
- Publisher: Mage Publishers (2000, 2002); IB Tauris (2000, in the United Kingdom); Atiy-e Press (2002, in Iran)
- Publication date: 2000
- Publication place: United Kingdom
- Media type: Print
- Pages: 399 pp.
- ISBN: 0-934211-61-2
- OCLC: 491803744

The Persian Sphinx: Amir Abbas Hoveyda and the Riddle of the Iranian Revolution is a political historical biography of Amir Abbas Hoveyda by Iranian-American historian and author Abbas Milani. The book covers his early life, rise in politics and 12 year tenure as the longest serving prime minister of Iran from 1965 to 1977 during the reign of Shah Mohammad Reza Pahlavi until his trial and execution in the aftermath of the Iranian revolution in 1979.

== Title and content ==
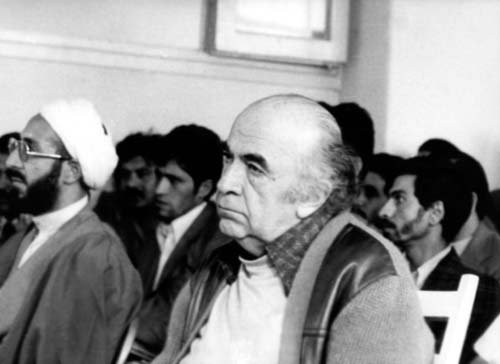
Hoveyda in court, 1979

The book is a product of Milani's four-year extensive study. The title of the book makes an analogy between Hoveyda and the Sphinx which is a figure used in Persian art and sculpture. The Sphinx is "a mythical creature with the body of a lion, most often with a human head and sometimes with wings."

The book provides a detailed biography of Hoveyda from his childhood in a middle-class family with aristocratic roots, his education at distinguished institutions in Beirut, London, and Brussels, his career, including his premiership (1965-1977), to his tragic end of death by execution in April 1979 following the 1979 revolution. In addition to Hoveyda's life, the book covers the background social developments in Iran from 1918 to 1978 and the relations between Iran and the US at this period of time. Throughout the book, Milani also highlights Hoveyda's impact and legacy on Iranian politics and history.

Milani has included nearly all information about Hoveyda through analysis of archival materials that had before not been examined including Hoveyda's unpublished correspondences and diaries and also through interviews with more than a hundred of his family members, friends, and others with differing views. The last chapter of the book, which is about Hoveyda's trial, is based on the tapes recorded during the process.

== Editions ==
The book was originally published in English by Mage Publications and by IB Tauris in the United Kingdom in 2000. The Persian language version of the book was published in 2001. Next year another Persian edition of the book was published with the translation of Milani, entitled Moamay-e Hoveyda. The publisher of this edition is Atiy-e Press in Iran. As of 2013, English version of the book was in third print and the Persian version by Milani in fifteenth print.

== Reception ==
George E. Gruen stated positive remarks about the book, arguing that the book provides the reader with very detailed account of Iran from 1918 to 1979 and of the US-Iran relations during the related period. James A. Bill adds that the book offers the reader an opportunity to fully understand the underlying mechanisms of the Iranian revolution. Mark Dankof, reviewed the book in Global News Net (GNN) and Iranian Times, praised Milani's narration, the use of footnotes and photographs, and added that the book efficiently reflects the country during the Pahlavi era. However, he also stated that some of Milani's points in the book are either contradictory or overemphasized. Mostafa Rahimi, in his review in Jahān-e Ketāb, a journal founded in post-1979 Iran, claimed that Milani's book attempts to present Hoveyda as an intellectual, arguing that Hoveyda was just "a power-hungry politician".

Another Iranian reviewer, Afshin Matin Asgari of California State University, describes the topic of the book as controversial without giving his specific reference. For him, the book is "disappointing" due to the author's overt bias towards the subject and events narrated. He further argues that although the sources are mostly scientific, the informants whose reports are frequently cited are often family members such as Hoveyda's brother, Fereydoun Hoveyda, and his former wife, Laila Emami. S. Cronin in his review also expresses similar views and argues that Milani did not adequately describe the harsh aspects of the Shah's regime. He also adds that the language used by Milani to describe the judges at the Hoveyda’s tribunal, such as Sadeq Khalkhali, is so biased that it does not help the book in enhancing his main arguments.

The book was reviewed in Journal of Islamic Studies by Shahrough Akhavi, an adjunct professor of political science at Columbia University and distinguished professor emeritus of political science at the University of South Carolina. He states that although book has some weakness, it is due to scarce scientific materials on the subject. He also remarks that the author used the available materials from the French Foreign Ministry Archives for 1944-55, the John F. Kennedy Library, the Lyndon B. Johnson Library, the National Security Archive and the National Archives in Washington, D.C., as well as scientific articles by Iranian scholars. However, he also argues that the book does not cover all details about Hoveyda's last days. For instance, there is no mention of Hoveyda's posthumous award with the title of Commander of the Legion of Honour and letters of six French prime ministers to Khomeini to save his life.

Writing in Asriran.com , Mehrdad Khadir wrote: "Although Hadi Ghaffari claims that Hoveyda's corpse has been transferred to Israel, Milani's claim about him being buried anonymously in Behesht-e Zahra is much more logical".

Persian edition of Persian Sphinx was named book of the year by Deutsch Radio in 2002.
