= Sadegh Sadrieh =

- میرصادق صدریه

Foreign Affairs of Iran

Ambassador in Germany, Romania and Iraq
- Monarch: Mohammad Reza Pahlavi
- Prime Minister: Shapour Bakhtiar

Iran Ambassador in Germany
- Appointed by: Mohammad Reza Pahlavi

Personal details
- Born: 2 February 1925 Yazd, Iran
- Died: 4 November 2009 (aged 84) Toronto, Canada
- Resting place: Mount Pleasant Cemetery, Toronto
- Party: National Resistance Movement of Iran
- Spouse(s): Mahin Banoo; Azimi, Maryam; Shaikh-Ol-Islami
- Children: 3
- Education: PhD in economics, University of Cologne

Military service
- Branch/service: Iranian Foreign Minister
- Years of service: 1930–1979
- Unit: Iranian Foreign Minister Office

Sadegh Sadrieh (Persian: میرصادق صدریه; (2 February 1925 – 5 November 2009) was a prominent Iranian politician and diplomat who served as Foreign Ministry Office counselor and as ambassador during the Pahlavi era.

He was the last Iranian ambassador in Germany before Iranian Revolution. He also served as Iran's ambassador and foreign counselor in Romania, Iraq, Israel, France, Kuwait, Pakistan, and Afghanistan.

Sadrieh moved to Paris to join Shapour Bakhtiar in support of "Nehzat Moghavemat Meli", Iranian National Resistance movement. He joined Bakhtira's team as Counselor with his accompany Ahmad Mirfendereski.

During Bakhtiar's lifetime, he represented the National Resistance Movement Council on his behalf,

In the late 1980s, because of his Iraqi connections, he was appointed to succeed Mohammad Moshiri as Chairman of NAMIR's Executive Committee.

Arranging the 1975 Algiers Agreement was done under his supervision as Director of Iranian Foreign Ministry Office.

== Life and education ==
Mirsadegh was born in Yazd in 1925. After high school, he attended Tehran University and got his BS in Political Science.

Following his uncle's recommendation who was a member of the Parlement, he joined the Iranian Ministry of Foreign Affairs. He started working as an intern in the international affairs department.

His first mission as an attaché to the Iranian delegation was to the Allied Powers in Stuttgart under the tutelage of Abdollah Entezam. Mir Sadegh got his doctoral dissertation in economics with German politician and Chancellor Heinrich Brüning. He received his doctorate in economics from the University of Cologne.

== Work courses ==
- 1954 - Receives his first award from the Government of the Federal Republic of Germany and participates in the 10th session of the UN General Assembly in New York, accompanied by a delegation of Dr. Mohammad Mosadegh, Prime Minister, from Iran.
- 1957 - He was sent to France as the first secretary of the Iranian embassy in Paris and at the same time was assigned as the European common market counselor.
- 1960 - Counselor of the Iranian Embassy and then sponsor of the Iranian Consulate General in Herat, Afghanistan
- 1961 - Sent to the Consulate General of the Iranian Embassy in Kuwait.
- 1963 - became a member of the Supreme Council of Employment Affairs and the sponsor of the seventh political department of the Persian Gulf. In the same year, for political reasons, he was sent as an adviser to the Iranian Embassy in Bern and to his place of employment in Tel Aviv, Israel.
- 1968 - Head of the Fifth Political Bureau and as an alternate member of the Iranian delegation to the 23rd session of the UN General Assembly left for New York.
- 1970 - As Iranian Ambassador to Bucharest - Romania
- 1974 - Iranian Ambassador to Baghdad - Iraq
- 1978 - Iran's ambassador to federal Germany
