= Hassan Kazemi Qomi =

Iranian Ambassador to Iraq

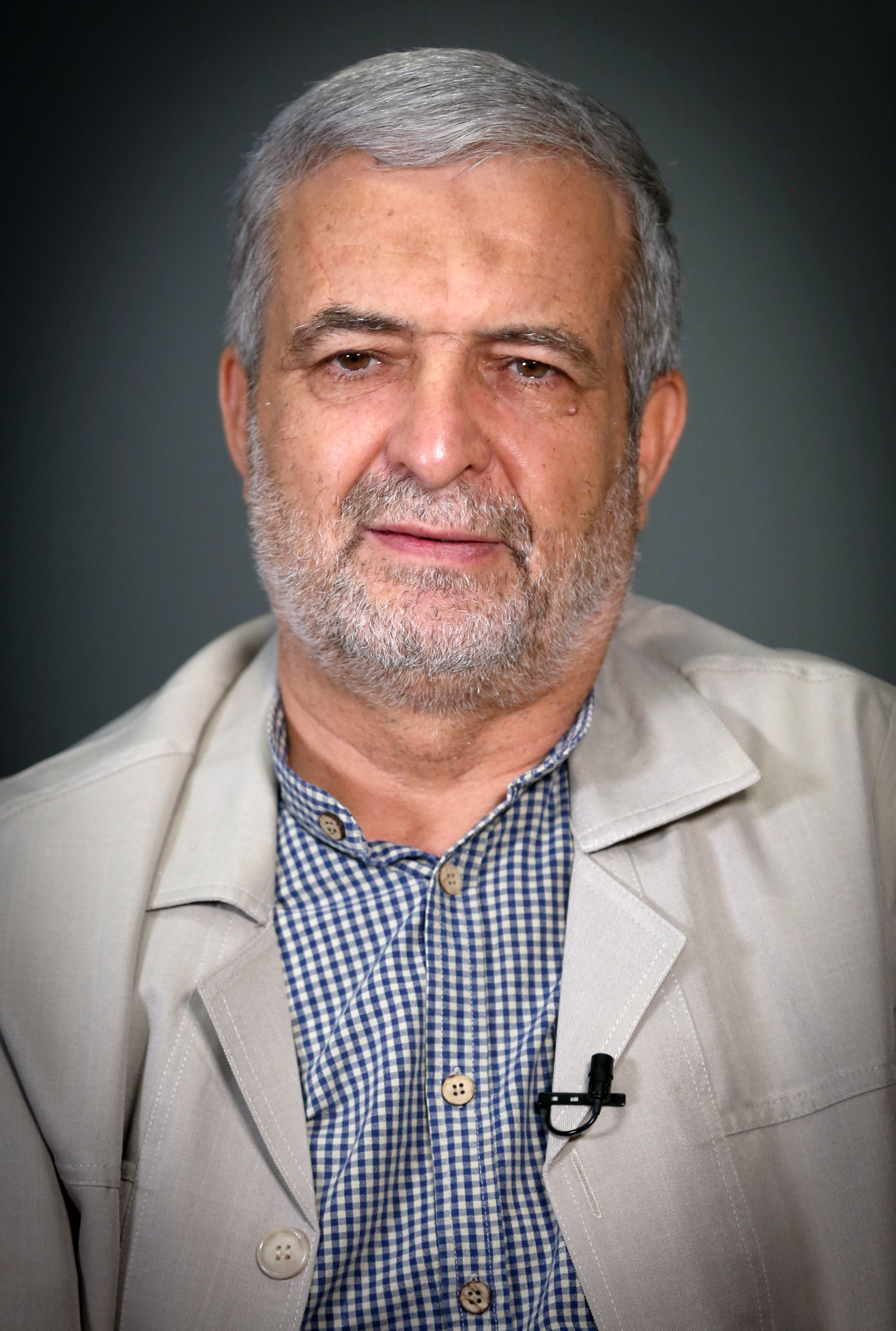
- Kazemi Qomi in 2020

Ambassador of Iran to Afghanistan
- In office 18 December 2022 – 24 November 2024
- President: Ebrahim Raisi
- Preceded by: Bahador Aminian
- Succeeded by: Alireza Bigdeli

Ambassador of Iran to Iraq
- In office 2006–2010
- President: Mahmoud Ahmadinejad
- Preceded by: Himself as Chargé d'affaires
- Succeeded by: Hassan Danaeifar

Personal details
- Born: 1959 (age 66–67) Qom, Iran
- Occupation: Diplomat

Hassan Kazemi Qomi (Persian: حسن کاظمی قمی) is an Iranian diplomat and was formerly ambassador of Iran to Afghanistan and special representative of the president of Iran to Afghanistan.

He was formerly the ambassador of Iran to Iraq. In 2007, U.S. general in Iraq David Petraeus claimed that Kazemi Qomi is a member of the Quds Force.

On October 17, 2021, President Ebrahim Raisi appointed Kazemi Qomi as the special envoy to Afghanistan.

== See also ==
- Karbala provincial headquarters raid

Diplomatic posts
Vacant Title last held by Mahmoud Doayi	Iranian Ambassador to Iraq; 2005–2010	Succeeded by Hassan Danaeifar
