= List of ambassadors of Iran to Bahrain =

Coordinates: 26.208379°N 50.579872°E

Ambassador of Iran to Bahrain
- Coat of Arms of Iran
- Inaugural holder: Majid Mehran
- Formation: 1970

The Iranian ambassador in Manama is the official representative of the Government in Tehran to the Government of Bahrain.

In 1972 a declaration on the establishment of political relations between the governments was issued at the embassy level in Tehran and Manama.

== List of representatives ==
Diplomatic accreditation	Diplomatic accreditation Solar Hijri calendar	Ambassador	Persian language	Observations	List of presidents of Iran	Prime Minister of Bahrain	Term end	Term end Solar Hijri calendar
1970	1348	Majid Mehran	Persian: مجید مهران	Chargé d'affaires, Tehran strongly objected to “ill-treatment” of Majid Mehran, Iranian Charge d' Affairs	Mohammad Reza Pahlavi	Khalifa bin Salman Al Khalifa		
1972	1350	Manuchehr Sepahbodi	Persian: منوچهر سپهبدی		Mohammad Reza Pahlavi	Khalifa bin Salman Al Khalifa	1977	1355
1977	1355	Ismail Farboud	Persian: اسماعیل فربود		Mohammad Reza Pahlavi	Khalifa bin Salman Al Khalifa	1980	1358
1979	1357	Mohammad- Jalal Firouznia	Persian: محمدجلال فیروزنیا	On July 1, 2018 he was appointed Iranian ambassador to Lebanon, replacing Mohamad Fathali, whose tenure has come to an end.	Mohammad Reza Pahlavi	Khalifa bin Salman Al Khalifa		
2002	1380	Mohammad Farazmand	Persian: محمد فرازمند	(*January 30, 1962 in Zahedan): Since February 7, 2019 he is Iranian ambassador to Turkey. He is married and has three children. Since 1987 he is Bachelor of International Relations from the Foreign Ministry’s School of International Relations.; Since 2010 he is Master of Philosophy and Mysticism (Irfan from the Tehran Islamic Azad University. He speaks English and Arabic.; From 1988 to 1989 he was Political Expert / in the Iraq Desk, Ministry of Foreign Affair.; From 1989 to 1990 he was Political Counsellor in Kuwait City.; From 1991 to 1997 he was Deputy Chief Of Mission in Riyadh.; From 1997 to 2002 he headed the Persian Gulf Department.; From 2002 to 2007 he was Iranian ambassador to Bahrain.; From 2007 to 2014 he was Senior Expert / in the Institute For Political And International Studies, Ministry of Foreign Affairs.; From 2014 to 2019 he was Assistant to the Foreign Minister and headed the Persian Gulf Department.	Mohammad Khatami	Khalifa bin Salman Al Khalifa	2007	
2007	1385	Hossein Amir-Abdollahian	Persian: حسین امیرعبداللهیان		Mahmoud Ahmadinejad	Khalifa bin Salman Al Khalifa		
2011	1389	Mehdi Agha Jafari	Persian: مهدی آقاجعفری	Till June 6, 2010 he was Chargé d'affaires as Iranian ambassador to the United Arab Emirates.	Mahmoud Ahmadinejad	Khalifa bin Salman Al Khalifa	2013	1391
June 6, 2010	1390	Morteza Sanubari	Persian: مرتضی صنوبری	Chargé d'affaires, Morteza Senoubari	Mahmoud Ahmadinejad	Khalifa bin Salman Al Khalifa	2013	
January 14, 2013	1391			Bahrain cut its political ties with Iran.	Hassan Rouhani	Khalifa bin Salman Al Khalifa	2021	
October 1, 2015	1394			On the occasion of the 2016 attack on the Saudi diplomatic missions in Iran the diplomatic relations were scaled back to a Chargé d'affaires level. Manama: Bahrain has withdrawn its ambassador to Iran and asked the Iranian Acting Charge d’Affaires to leave the kingdom within 72 hours after he was declared persona non-grata.	Hassan Rouhani	Khalifa bin Salman Al Khalifa	2021	
November 29, 2015	1392	Hamid Shafizadeh	Persian: حمید شفیع‌زاده	Chargé d'affaires	Hassan Rouhani	Khalifa bin Salman Al Khalifa	2021	
2016	1393	Mohammad Reza Babaei	Persian: محمدرضا بابایی	Chargé d'affaires The Bahraini government announced an undesirable element.	Hassan Rouhani	Khalifa bin Salman Al Khalifa	2021	

== See also ==
- Bahrain–Iran relations
