= List of ambassadors of Iran to Azerbaijan =

Coordinates: 40.367543°N 49.830752°E

Ambassador of Iran to Azerbaijan
- Persian: سفیر ایران در جمهوری آذربایجان
- Coat of Arms of Iran

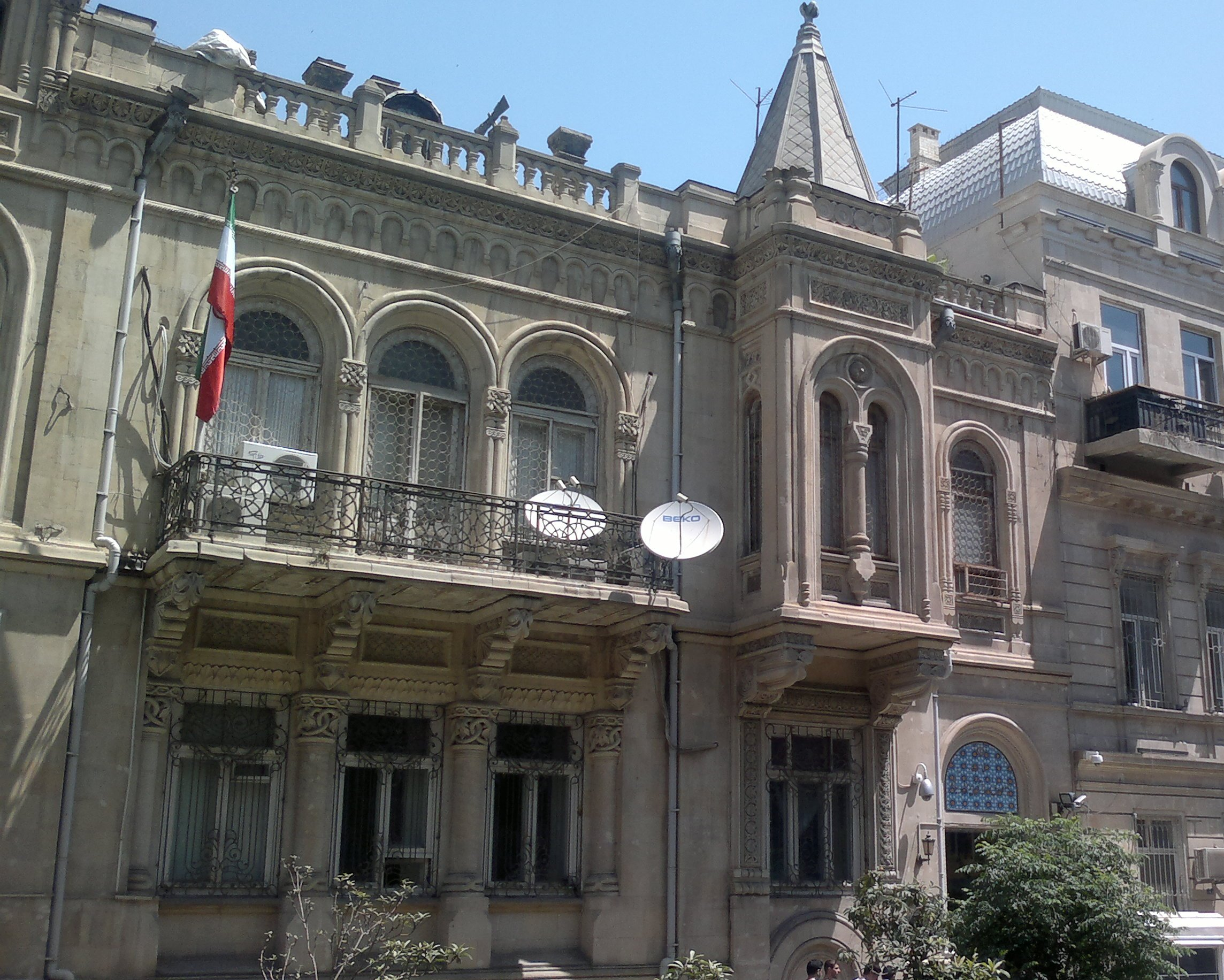
- Incumbent; Mojtaba Demirchilu since June 2025
- Inaugural holder: Ali-Asghar Nahavandian
- Formation: 1993

The Iranian ambassador in Baku is the official representative of the Government in Tehran to the Government of Azerbaijan.

On 30 August 1991 the modern Republic of Azerbaijan proclaimed its independence, shortly before the dissolution of the USSR in the same year. In 1991 the governments of Həsən Həsənov and Akbar Hashemi Rafsanjani recognized each other mutually. In 1992 they established diplomatic relations.

== List of representatives ==
Diplomatic accreditation	Diplomatic accreditation Solar Hijri calendar	Ambassador	Persian language	Observations	List of presidents of Iran	Prime Minister of Azerbaijan	Term end	Term end Solar Hijri calendar
1993	1371	Ali-Asghar Nahavandian	Persian: علی‌اصغر نهاوندیان		Akbar Hashemi Rafsanjani	Surat Huseynov	1996	1374
1996	1374	Ali-Reza Bigdeli	Persian: علیرضا بیگدلی		Akbar Hashemi Rafsanjani	Artur Rasizade	2001	1379
2002	1380	Ahad Qazaei	Persian: احد قضایی		Mohammad Khatami	Artur Rasizade	2004	1382
2005	1383	Afshar Soleimani	Persian: افشار سلیمانی		Mahmoud Ahmadinejad	Artur Rasizade	2008	1386
2008	1386	Nasser Hamidi Zare	Persian: ناصر حمیدی زارع		Mahmoud Ahmadinejad	Artur Rasizade	2010	1388
2010	1388	Mohammad-Bagher Bahrami (fa)	Persian: محمدباقر بهرامی	22.05.2012 - Iranian officials said the envoy, Mohammad B. Bahrami, was summoned	Mahmoud Ahmadinejad	Artur Rasizade	2013	1391
2012	1390	Mohsen Pak-Ayin (fa)	Persian: محسن پاک‌آیین	From 2004 to 2007 he was Iranian Ambassador to Thailand	Mahmoud Ahmadinejad	Artur Rasizade	August 28, 2016	1394
August 28, 2016	1394	Javad Jahangirzadeh	Persian: جواد جهانگیرزاده		Hassan Rouhani	Artur Rasizade	August 15, 2020	1399
August 15, 2020	1399	Abbas Mousavi	Persian: عباس موسوی		Hassan Rouhani	Ali Asadov	May 20, 2024	1403

== See also ==
- Azerbaijan–Iran relations
