= Hassan Danaeifar =

Iranian military officer

Sardar Hassan Danaeifar

Iranian Ambassador to Iraq
- In office 31 July 2010 – 18 April 2017
- President: Mahmoud Ahmadinejad; Hassan Rouhani
- Preceded by: Hassan Kazemi Qomi
- Succeeded by: Iraj Masjedi

Personal details
- Born: 1962 (age 63–64) Baghdad, Iraqi Republic

Military service
- Allegiance: Iran
- Branch/service: Revolutionary Guards
- Unit: Navy; Quds Force
- Commands: Command and Staff College; Khatam al-Anbiya HQ

Hassan Danaeifar (Persian: حسن دانایی‌فر) is an Iranian military officer in the Islamic Revolutionary Guard Corps. He served as Iran's ambassador to Iraq from 2010 to 2017. Prior to the appointment, he held office as the secretary-general of the 'Iran–Iraq Economic Development Center' and head of the 'Headquarters for the Restoration of Holy Shrines'.

== Early life ==
Danaeifar was born in 1962 in Baghdad, Iraq. He was among the Iraqi Moavedin who took refuge in Iran during the 1980s.

== Military career ==
Danaeifar served most of his career in the Islamic Revolutionary Guard Corps as a civil engineer and logistician. He was the deputy commander of the IRGC Navy and commander of the Khatam al-Anbiya Construction Headquarters. He also served in the Quds Force.

Diplomatic posts
| Preceded by Hassan Kazemi Qomi | Iranian Ambassador to Iraq; 2010–2017 | Succeeded by Iraj Masjedi |
Military offices
| Preceded by Mohammad Bagher Ghalibaf | Commander of the Khatam al-Anbiya Construction Headquarters; 1997–2001 | Succeeded by Abdolreza Abed |
