= List of ambassadors of Iran to the United Arab Emirates =

Coordinates: 24.422185°N 54.438731°E

Ambassador of Iran to the United Arab Emirates
- Coat of Arms of Iran
- Incumbent; Reza Ameri since June 15, 2023
- Inaugural holder: Manuchehr Behnam
- Formation: January 18, 1973

The Iranian ambassador in Abu Dhabi is the official representative of the Government in Tehran to the Government of the United Arab Emirates.

== List of representatives ==
Diplomatic accreditation	Ambassador	Persian language	Observations	List of presidents of Iran	List of prime ministers of the United Arab Emirates	Term end
January 18, 1973	Manuchehr Behnam	Persian: منوچهر بهنام	Ambassador Accredited Iran's first Ambassador to the United Arab Emirates. Manuchehr Behnam (ARR 72/607), presented his credentials	Mohammad Reza Pahlavi	Maktoum bin Rashid Al Maktoum	
1977	Ebrahim Teimuri	Persian: ابراهیم تیموری	(1924 1981) was a diplomat and senior civil servant.: He got his Doctorate in Political Science and Public administration theory from a Swiss University.; In 1949 he joined the Records Department of Identification of the Ministry of Foreign Affairs (Iran) and became member of the Hajj Supervisory Board which went to Saudi Arabia with the Hajjis (Pilgrims).; In 1950 he was employed at the library.; In 1951 he worked in the department of personal and Budget.; In 1953 he was attached to the legation in Bern.; In 1955 he became third secretary at Bern.; In 1956 he became second secretary in Tel Aviv.; Ebrahim Teimuri Execution: Shooting; March 21, 1981; Tehran, Tehran Province, Iran	Mohammad Reza Pahlavi	Maktoum bin Rashid Al Maktoum	
December 1, 1979	Reza Ridha Esmail Hamad Borqai, Hojjat ol-Eslam			Mohammad Reza Pahlavi	Rashid bin Saeed Al Maktoum	July 1, 1988
January 1, 1985	Mostafa Haeri Fumani, Hojjat ol-Eslam	Persian: مصطفی فومنی حائری	Mostafa Haeri Fumani, Mostafa Haeri Fomani (*1951 in Tehran) was the representative of the people of Fuman, Iran in the first term of the Islamic Consultative Assembly.: On November 1, 1988 he became head of the Department Persian Gulf Affairs in the Ministry of Foreign Affairs (Iran).; In the government of Hassan Rouhani, he was appointed senior assistant secretary of state for oversight. Also, Mustafa Haeri Fomeni is the head of the Development Council of Guilan Province and the head of the Great Qur'an's Nursing Authority.	Ali Khamenei	Rashid bin Saeed Al Maktoum	November 1, 1988
1986	Hassan Aminian			Ali Khamenei	Rashid bin Saeed Al Maktoum	
September 1, 1989	Mohammad Ali Hadi Najafabadi	Persian: محمدعلی هادی نجف‌آبادی	Mohammad Ali Hadi Najafabadi is an Iranian cleric and politician. During his stay in Ayatollah Khomeini's residence in Paris, he was translating his speeches into Arabic, and after the revolution he was the representative of the first and second sessions of the Islamic Consultative Assembly, and later Iranina ambassador to Saudi Arabia and Iranina ambassador to the United Arab Emirates, and the Deputy Foreign Minister's Consular and Parliamentary at the time of the Ministry of Commerce Kharazi.	Akbar Hashemi Rafsanjani	Rashid bin Saeed Al Maktoum	October 1, 1989
April 1, 1992	Hasan Amimian Hojjat ol-Eslam		Hojjat ol-Eslam Hasan Aminian, Iranian ambassador to Yemen	Akbar Hashemi Rafsanjani	Maktoum bin Rashid Al Maktoum	August 1, 1992
April 1, 1992	Hussein Sadeqi	Persian: حسین صادقی (دیپلمات)	Hossein Kamal Sadeqi was Iranian ambassador to Kuwait and Iranian ambassador to Saudi Arabia	Akbar Hashemi Rafsanjani	Maktoum bin Rashid Al Maktoum	February 1, 1998
December 1, 1997	Mohammad Arab	Persian: محمد عرب (دیپلمات	Consul General Dubai	Mohammad Khatami	Maktoum bin Rashid Al Maktoum	January 1, 1998
September 1, 1989	Mohammad Ali Hadi Najafabadi	Persian: محمدعلی هادی نجف‌آبادی		Akbar Hashemi Rafsanjani	Rashid bin Saeed Al Maktoum	April 1, 1991
2007	Hamid-Reza Assefi	Persian: حمیدرضا آصفی	He stressed the need for Tehran and Abu Dhabi to endorse the required agreements to support the two countries' labor force.	Mahmoud Ahmadinejad	Mohammed bin Rashid Al Maktoum	2010
June 6, 2010	Mehdi Agha Jafari	Persian: مهدی آقاجعفری	chargé d'affaires Jun 6, 2010: Iranian ambassador to Bahrain	Mahmoud Ahmadinejad	Mohammed bin Rashid Al Maktoum	June 6, 2010
2012	Mohammad Reza Fayaz	Persian: محمدرضا فیاض	The trade between Iran and the United Arab Emirates reached $25 billion in 2005. Iran's Ambassador to the United Arab Emirates, has returned to Tehran, after the emirate called for his ambassador to Tehran. The ISNA news agency reported that the Iranian ambassador to Tehran had returned to Iran by the decision of the Iranian Foreign Ministry. ISNA says 7 officers will remain in Abu Dhabi and 8 in the Consulate General of Dubai. Saudi Arabia and several other countries have cut their ties with Iran after the 2016 attack on the Saudi diplomatic missions in Iran.	Mahmoud Ahmadinejad	Mohammed bin Rashid Al Maktoum	January 1, 2016
2016	Mohammad Baratian	Persian: محمد براتیان	chargé d'affaires	Hassan Rouhani	Mohammed bin Rashid Al Maktoum	2020
2020	Seyed Mohammad Hosseini	Persian: سید محمد حسینی	chargé d'affaires	Hassan Rouhani	Mohammed bin Rashid Al Maktoum	2022
2022	Hossein Heidari	Persian: حسین حیدری	chargé d'affaires	Ebrahim Raisi	Mohammed bin Rashid Al Maktoum	2023
June 15, 2023	Reza Ameri	Persian: رضا عامری	Appointing new ambassador to UAE after eight years	Ebrahim Raisi	Mohammed bin Rashid Al Maktoum	

== See also ==
- Iran–United Arab Emirates relations
- Embassy of Iran, Abu Dhabi
