= Mozaffar Alam =

Iranian politician and military officer (1882–1973)

Minister of Foreign Affairs
- In office 7 March 1939 – 20 April 1943
- Preceded by: Ali Soheili
- Succeeded by: Hossein Ala'

Personal details
- Born: 1882 Trabzon, Trebizond Vilayet, Ottoman Empire
- Died: 1973 (aged 90–91) Tehran, Pahlavi Iran
- Parent: Mirzā ʿAli Akbar Khan Moʿtamed al Wezāra Qazvini (father)

Mozaffar Alam (Persian: مظفر اعلم; 1882–1973) was an Iranian politician who served as the minister of foreign affairs. He was also a military official and governor of various Iranian provinces.

== Early life and education ==
Alam was born in Trabzon in 1882 as Sardar Entesar. His father, Mirzā ʿAli Akbar Khan Moʿtamed al Wezāra Qazvini, was a ranking officer in the ministry of foreign affairs and served in consular positions in Baku, Istanbul, Damascus and Baghdad.

Alam received primary and secondary education in Baku and Tehran. Then he attended the Ottoman military school. Next he attended Saint Cyr military school receiving education in artillery field in France. He continued his training in infantry.

== Career ==
After completing his education and returning to Iran, Alam began to work at the ministry of foreign affairs and then, was appointed Iranian consul in Damascus. However, he resigned from his post to pursue security career. He was promoted the deputy and then the chief of security forces. Next he began to serve as the head of the Cossack brigade and was promoted to the rank of colonel and then brigadier general during World War I. After the 1921 coup, Alam was appointed governor of Isfahan. Later he served as the governor of Kurdestan and then, Azerbaijan. In 1935, Alam was the head of the General Department of Trade.

From 1938 to 1950 Alam served as the minister of foreign affairs in three different cabinets. He was appointed to the office in July 1938 replacing Ali Soheili in the post. Alam remained in the office until October 1940.

In 1951, Alam was named extraordinary ambassador and plenipotentiary to Saudi Arabia. In August 1953, he was made ambassador to Iraq. On 17 August, the Shah Mohammad Reza Pahlavi left Iran due to the turmoil which would lead to the end of government of Mohammad Mosaddegh. When he had a stopover in Baghdad he said the Iranian ambassador tried to have him arrested. In fact, Alam was following the orders of the Iranian Foreign Minister Hossein Fatemi who had ordered the Iranian diplomats abroad not to welcome, visit, or receive the Shah. On 21 August 1953, the Shah returned to Baghdad from Rome. At the airport, he was officially received by the Crown Prince 'Abd al-Ilah and members of the Iraqi cabinet. He declined to receive the Persian Ambassador to Iraq, Mozaffar Alam, or any members of his staff. Following the 1953 Iranian coup d'état, Alam went to Syria where he stayed for a while before leaving for France. He stayed in France until 1971 after which he had permission to return to Iran.

== Death ==
Alam died in Tehran in 1973 at age 91. His family was not permitted to organize a funeral ceremony for him.
