= The Shah (book) =

2011 book by Abbas Milani

- English first edition
- Author: Abbas Milani
- Original title: A look at the Shah نگاهی به شاه
- Language: Persian
- Pages: 602

The Shah (Persian: نگاهی به شاه, A look at the Shah) is a 2011 book by Abbas Milani, published by Macmillan. It is a biography of Mohammad Reza Pahlavi, the final Shah of Iran.

Susanne Pari of the San Francisco Chronicle stated that the biography was even-handed, lacking bias, and that it was "a fair and insightful account of a psychologically complex man who was ill-suited for a hard job, yet unable to give up or give in." Stanley Meisler, in a Los Angeles Times article, also stated that the book had a neutral tone even though Pahlavi's government had previously persecuted Milani.

== Background ==
Milani, a political scientist, is in charge of Stanford University's Iranian Studies program. He had immigrated to the United States but later took a position in Iran as a teacher. He had been imprisoned by the Pahlavi government. Milani returned to Iran after the overthrow of the shah, but left again in 1986 when he had a conflict with the new rulers. Christian Caryl of Radio Free Europe/Radio Liberty stated that the persecution from both Pahlavi and Ayatollah forces likely influenced Milani's impartiality. He read diplomatic reports and other formerly classified information from Iran, the United Kingdom, and the United States as part of his research. He also conducted several interviews.

== Contents ==
Pari stated that Pahlavi appears "distrustful and paranoid", based on failed assassination attempts and other actions against him, and that the author's research validates this portrait. Milani had described Pahlavi as "in the classical sense of the word, a tragic figure — a hare pretending to roar like a lion." The book uses lines from King Richard II at the start of each chapter; this was done to compare Pahlavi to Richard II of England. The final portion of the book chronicles the overthrow of Pahlavi.

== Reception ==
Joshua Muravchik, a research fellow of the Johns Hopkins University School of Advanced International Studies stated in a Wall Street Journal article that the book was "even-handed and fair-minded" and that it is "a finely wrought, enlightening biography".

David C. Acheson of the Washington Times stated that The Shah had "impressive" scholarship even though the book may find an amount of detail that would be "formidably dense". Acheson concluded that the book will "likely to be the definitive biography of his subject, judging from the plethora of sources, notes, interviews and correspondence."

Meisler stated that the book is "a thoughtful and colorful biography without rancor." Meisler compared the overthrow of Pahlavi with the overthrow of former President of Egypt Hosni Mubarak, which occurred as part of the Arab Spring at the time of Meisler's review.

Caryl stated that due to the high level of controversy and polarization surrounding the Shah in Iranian communities across the world, "Milani’s impartiality is vital".

Publishers Weekly stated that the book is a "good source" about Pahlavi's life, but that it was "good enough to pique the reader's frustration that it isn't great." Publishers Weekly stated that some facts lacked context and therefore a reader would not know how to interpret them.

Kirkus Reviews stated it was "an incisive portrait" of Pahlavi and "A stimulating biography and a thorough examination of the makeup of" Iran.
