= Mohsen Rais =

Iranian politician (1895–1975)

Minister of Foreign Affairs
- In office 18 July 1950 – 11 March 1951
- Monarch: Mohammad Reza Pahlavi
- Prime Minister: Haj Ali Razmara
- Preceded by: Mahmud Salahi

Minister of Posts and Telecommunications
- In office 1942–1942
- Monarch: Rezā Shāh

Ambassador of Iran to the United Kingdom
- In office 1961–1962
- Preceded by: Hossein Ghods-Nakhai
- Succeeded by: Ardeshir Zahedi
- In office 1947–1950
- Preceded by: Hassan Taqizadeh
- Succeeded by: Ali Soheili

Ambassador of Iran to Iraq
- In office 1943–1947
- Preceded by: Musa Nuri Esfandiari
- Succeeded by: Muhammed Shayesta

Personal details
- Born: 1895 Tehran, Qajar Iran
- Died: 1975 (aged 79–80)
- Parent: Zahir ol Mulk (father)
- Education: University of Geneva

Mohsen Rais (Persian: محسن رئیس; 1895–1975), also known as Mirza Mohsen Khan, was an Iranian diplomat and served as foreign minister and as ambassador during the Pahlavi era.

== Early life and education ==
Rais was born about 1895 in Tehran. He was the eldest son of Zahir ol Mulk. He was a graduate of the University of Geneva.

== Career ==
Rais joined the Iranian foreign ministry in 1919. He was part of an association, Gamiyet-i Iran-i Javan (Young Iran Association), which was founded by Iranian intellectuals in 1921. The founders of the association were all educated in Europe. Rais served as a counsellor in Paris from 1930 to 1933. He was named director of the League of Nations and treaty department in the ministry in 1933 and was in office until 1935. He was the ambassador of Iran to Germany from 1935 to 1938. In 1938, he served as acting foreign minister. He was appointed director general of the political affairs at the foreign ministry in 1938 which he held until 1939.

Then he served as the ambassador to Romania and Yugoslavia (1939-1941), ambassador to France (1941–1942), minister of posts and telecommunications (1942) and ambassador to Iraq (1943-1947). He was appointed Iran's ambassador to the United Kingdom on 6 August 1947, replacing Hassan Taqizadeh in the post. He held the post until July 1950 and was succeeded by Ali Soheili in the post.

Rais was appointed foreign minister on 18 July 1950 replacing Mahmud Salahi who had been serving as the acting foreign minister since 26 June in the cabinet of Haj Ali Razmara. Prime Minister Razmara chose Rais because of his good relations with the British. Rais's term lasted until 11 March 1951 when a new cabinet was formed by Hossein Ala' due to the assassination of Razmara on 7 March. A friendship agreement between Iran and Italy was signed in Tehran on 24 September 1950 when Rais was serving as the foreign minister.

In the period 10 November 1953 to 29 January 1958 Rais was the ambassador of Iran to France. From 1958 to 1960, he was the governor-general of Azerbaijan. He was again transferred to diplomatic post and served as ambassador to the Netherlands (1960–1961), to the Court of St. James’s (1961–1962), and to France (1962–1963). His last public office was the governor of Tehran (1964-1969) and during the same period he was also a senator.

== Personal life and death ==
Rais was fluent in French. He married one of the daughters of Abdol-Hossein Farman Farma in 1935. They had a son and a daughter. His son was killed in a road accident after his graduation from a university. Following this incident Rais was hospitalized and died in 1975.

== Honors and awards ==
Rais was the recipient of various awards, including the Order of Homayun (1947; 1st class) and

- Grand Officer of Legion of Honour (1947).
