= Abbas Milani =

Iranian-American historian and author (born 1949)

- عباس میلانی
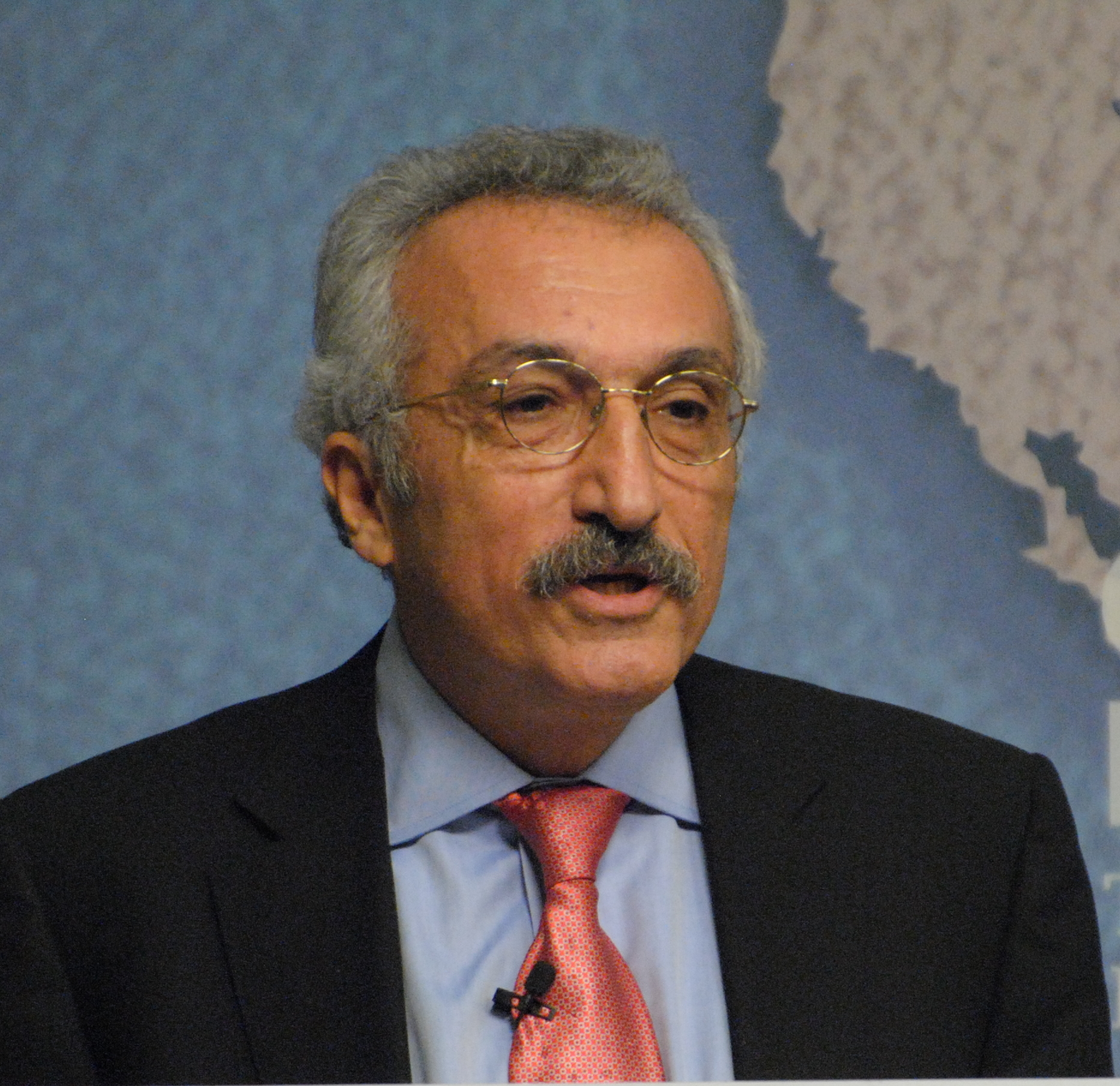
- Milani in 2010
- Born: Abbas Malekzadeh Milani عباس ملک‌زاده میلانی; 1949 (age 76–77); Tehran, Imperial State of Iran
- Citizenship: Iranian, American
- Spouses: Fereshteh Davaran (?–1988; divorced), Jean Nyland
- Children: 1

Academic background
- Education: University of California, Berkeley (BA); University of Hawaiʻi (PhD)
- Thesis: Ideology and the Iranian Constitutional Revolution: The Political Economy of the Ideological Currents of the Constitutional Revolution (1975)

Academic work
- Discipline: Political science and Iranian studies
- Institutions: National University of Iran; University of Tehran; University of California, Berkeley; Notre Dame de Namur University; Stanford University

Abbas Malekzadeh Milani (Persian: عباس ملک‌زاده میلانی; born 1949) is an Iranian-American historian, educator, and author. Milani is a visiting professor of political science, and the Hamid and Christina Moghadam Director of the Iranian Studies program at Stanford University. He is also a research fellow and co-director of the Iran Democracy Project at Stanford University's Hoover Institution. In Milani's book, Lost Wisdom: Rethinking Modernity in Iran (2004, Mage Publications), he has found evidence that Persian modernism dates back to more than 1,000 years ago.

== Biography ==
Milani was born in Iran to a prosperous family and was sent to California when he was sixteen, graduating from Oakland Technical High School in 1966 after only one year of studies. Milani earned his Bachelor of Arts in political science and economics from the University of California, Berkeley in 1970; and his Doctor of Philosophy in political science from the University of Hawaiʻi in 1974.

With his then-girlfriend Fereshteh, Milani returned to Iran to serve as an assistant professor of political science at the National University of Iran from 1975 to 1977. He lectured on Marxist themes veiled in metaphor but was jailed for two years as a political prisoner for "activities against the government". He was a research fellow at the Iranian Center for Social Research from 1977 to 1978. He was also an assistant professor of law and political science at the University of Tehran and a member of the board of directors of Tehran University's Center for International Studies from 1979 to 1986, but after the Iranian Revolution he was not allowed to publish or teach. He left Iran in 1986 during the time of the Iran–Iraq War for the United States, and his son Hamid and his wife Fereshteh followed.

Returning to California, Milani was appointed professor of History and Political Science as well as chair of the department at Notre Dame de Namur University in Belmont, California. He served as a research fellow at the Institute of International Studies at University of California, Berkeley (UC Berkeley).

Milani became a Hoover Institution research fellow in 2001 and left Notre Dame de Namur for Stanford University in 2002. He is currently the Hamid and Christina Moghadam Director of Iranian Studies at Stanford University.

Milani’s profile gained widespread international recognition following the publication of The Shah in 2011, a work that received universal acclaim. Reviewers praised its depth of scholarship and Milani's impartiality in addressing such a controversial topic, with David C. Acheson of Washington Times describing it as "impressive" in its research and analysis. Acheson further concluded that The Shah is "likely to be the definitive biography of its subject", citing its extensive use of sources, notes, interviews, and correspondence as evidence of its scholarly rigor and thoroughness.

Since 2011, Milani shifted the focus of his research to the era of Reza Shah.

== Political activities ==
Milani embraced Marxism–Leninism during his youth and was a member of a Maoist underground cell that was uncovered by Iranian security forces in 1975. He was subsequently jailed at Evin Prison, and became disillusioned with revolutionary politics. His eventual ideology has been described as neoconservative. In July 2009, Milani appeared in a United States House Committee on Foreign Affairs hearing amidst 2009 Iranian presidential election protests, and called for imposing "multilateral and crippling sanctions" on Iranians. He also advised the congressmen not to support the military invasion of Iran because it would not politically contribute to the American goal of regime change. Shortly afterward, Iranian prosecutors in the post-election trials built a case against the defendants by connecting them to Milani, mentioning him by name in the official indictment. Hamid Dabashi criticized Milani for undermining the Green Movement of Iran by supporting foreign intervention instead of grassroots democracy in Iran.

== Personal life ==
Milani separated from his first wife, Fereshteh Davaran, in 1988. He lives on the Stanford campus with his second wife, Jean Nyland, who is professor emerita and former chair of Notre Dame de Namur's psychology department.

== Bibliography ==
=== Books ===
- Milani, Abbas (1982). Malraux and the Tragic Vision. Agah Press.
- Milani, Abbas (1987). On Democracy and Socialism. Pars Press.
- Milani, Abbas (1998). Modernity and Its Foes in Iran. Gardon Press.
- Milani, Abbas (1996). Tales of Two Cities: A Persian Memoir. Washington, D.C.: Mage Publishers.
- Milani, Abbas (2004). Lost Wisdom: Rethinking Modernity in Iran. Washington, D.C.: Mage Publishers. ISBN 9781933823744.
- Milani, Abbas (2008). Eminent Persians: The Men and Women Who Made Modern Iran, 1941-1979, Volumes One and Two. New York, NY: Syracuse University Press. ISBN 9780815609070.
- Milani, Abbas (2009). The Persian Sphinx: Amir Abbas Hoveyda and the Riddle of the Iranian Revolution. Washington, D.C.: Mage Publishers. ISBN 9781933823348.
- Milani, Abbas (2011). The Shah. Palgrave Macmillan. ISBN 978-1-4039-7193-7.
- Milani, Abbas (2013). The Myth of the Great Satan: A New Look at America's Relations with Iran. Hoover Institution Press Publication. Hoover Press. ISBN 9780817911362.
- Milani, Abbas; Diamond, Larry Jay (2015). Politics and Culture in Contemporary Iran: Challenging the Status Quo. Boulder, CO: Lynne Rienner Publishers. ISBN 9781626371477.

=== Essays and articles ===
- Milani, Abbas (June 30, 2005). "The Silver Lining in Iran". The New York Times (Op-ed). ISSN 1553-8095.
- Milani, Abbas (November 10, 2005). "For Jews, there have always been two Irans". The New York Times (Op-ed). ISSN 1553-8095.
- Milani, Abbas (February 23, 2007). "What Scares Iran's Mullahs?". The New York Times (Op-ed). ISSN 1553-8095.
- Milani, Abbas (November–December 2007). "Pious populist". Boston Review. 32 (6).
- Milani, Abbas; Diamond, Larry (July 6, 2009). "Let's Hear the Democracies". The New York Times (Op-ed). ISSN 1553-8095.
- Milani, Abbas (2016). "Iran's Paradoxical Regime". In Diamond, Larry; Plattner, Marc F.; Walker, Christopher (eds.). Authoritarianism Goes Global: The Challenge to Democracy. Johns Hopkins University Press. pp. 57–66. ISBN 9781421419985.
- Milani, Abbas (January 22, 2021). "What Has Gone Wrong Between Iran and the United States?". The New York Times (Op-ed). p. 12. ISSN 1553-8095.
