= List of ambassadors of Iran to Thailand =

Coordinates: 13.737011°N 100.576346°E

Ambassador of Iran to Thailand
- Coat of Arms of Iran
- Incumbent; Nassereddin Heydari since June 23, 2024
- Inaugural holder: Mohammad Reza Beg
- Formation: 1685

The Iranian ambassador in Bangkok is the official representative of the Government in Tehran to the Government of Thailand.

== List of representatives ==
Diplomatic accreditation	Diplomatic accreditation Solar Hijri calendar	Ambassador	Persian language	Observations	List of heads of state of Iran	List of prime ministers of Thailand	Term end	Term end Solar Hijri calendar
1685	1064	Mohammad Reza Beg	Persian: محمدحسین بیگ	Mohammad Hussein Beyg	Suleiman of Persia	Thai Sa		
1957	1335	Ali-Asghar Hekmat	Persian: علی‌اصغر حکمت		Mohammad Reza Shah Pahlavi	Pote Sarasin		
1963	1340	Abdol-Hossein Sedigh Esfandiari (de)	Persian: عبدالحسین صدیق اسفندیاری	Ambassador Extraordinary	Mohammad Reza Shah Pahlavi	Sarit Dhanarajata		1341
1965	1341			Closure of the embassy due to budget savings	Mohammad Reza Shah Pahlavi	Thanom Kittikachorn		1343
1969	1343	Manouchehr Marzban (de)	Persian: منوچهر مرزبان		Mohammad Reza Shah Pahlavi	Thanom Kittikachor		1347
1969	1347	Rokneddin Ashtiani (de)			Mohammad Reza Shah Pahlavi	Thanom Kittikachorn		
1973	1347	Abdol-Hossein Hamzavi	Persian: عبدالحسین حمزاوی	Hoseyn Saidq 1947: Husband of one of the most beautiful women in London, Abdol-Hossein Hamzavi, tells me that he came to Persian Legation (it recently blossomed into embassy) seventeen years ago, as head, at nineteen, of consular department. Native of	Mohammad Reza Shah Pahlavi	Thanom Kittikachorn		1351
1973	1351	Mohsen Sediq Esfandiari	Persian: محسن صدیق اسفندیاری	Mohsen S. Esfandiary presented his Letters of Credence to President Sheares on 8 January at the Istana. The ambassador's residence is in Bangkok.	Mohammad Reza Shah Pahlavi	Sanya Dharmasakti		1356
28 December 1977	1356	Farajollah Borhani	Persian: فرج‌الله برهانی		Mohammad Reza Shah Pahlavi	Kriangsak Chomanan	1 May 1978	
1978	1358	Cyrus Zoka (fa)	Persian: سیروس ذکاء	Chargé d'affaires	Mohammad Reza Shah Pahlavi	Kriangsak Chomanan	1981	
1981	1359	Hassan Sabghati	Persian: حسن سبقتی	Chargé d'affaires	Abolhassan Banisadr	Prem Tinsulanonda		
1981	1359	Bijan Sharafshahi	Persian: علی شرفشاهی	Chargé d'affaires	Abolhassan Banisadr	Prem Tinsulanonda	1 July 1981	
1 July 1981	1360	Manouchehr Shahinfar	Persian: منوچهر شاهین‌فر	Chargé d'affaires	Abolhassan Banisadr	Prem Tinsulanonda	1 October 1982	1361
1 October 1982	1361	Houshang Rahimian	Persian: هوشنگ رحیمیان	Chargé d'affaires	Ali Khamenei	Prem Tinsulanonda	1986	1364
1 April 1986	1364	Reza-Hossein Mirza-Taheri (fa)	Persian: رضاحسین میرزاطاهری	Aban 1366	Ali Khamenei	[Prem Tinsulanonda	1987	1366
1 October 1987	1366	Mohammed-Mehdi Sazegara	Persian: محمدمهدی سازگارا	Chargé d'affaires	Ali Khamenei	Chatichai Choonhavan	1 October 1992	
1992	1371	Gholamreza Yousefi	Persian: غلامرضا یوسفی		Akbar Hashemi Rafsanjani	Suchinda Kraprayoon	1996	1375
1 December 1996	1375	Ramin Mehmanparast	Persian: رامین مهمان‌پرست		Akbar Hashemi Rafsanjani	Chavalit Yongchaiyudh	20 April 2000	1379
2000	1379	Rasoul Eslami (de)	Persian: رسول اسلامی	He was Iraninan Ambassador to the United Nations	Mohammad Khatami	Thaksin Shinawatra	2004	1383
2004	1383	Mohsen Pak-Ayin (fa)	Persian: محسن پاک‌آیین		Mohammad Khatami	Thaksin Shinawatra	2007	1386
2008	1387	Majid Bizmark	Persian: مجید بیزمارک		Mahmoud Ahmadinejad	Samak Sundaravej	2012	1391
2012	1391	Hossein Kamalian	Persian: حسین کمالیان	Chargé d'affaires	Hassan Rouhani	Yingluck Shinawatra	2015	1394
2015	1394	Mohsen Mohammadi	Persian: محسن محمدی		Hassan Rouhani	Prayut Chan-o-cha	2020	1399
October 27, 2020	1399	Seyed Reza Nobakhti	Persian: سید رضا نوبختی		Hassan Rouhani	Prayut Chan-o-cha	2024	1402
June 23, 2024	1403	Nassereddin Heydari	Persian: ناصرالدین حیدری		Ebrahim Raisi	Srettha Thavisin		

== See also ==
- Iran–Thailand relations
