= Hedayat Mosque =

Shi'ite mosque in Tehran, Iran

- مسجد هدایت
- Location of the mosque in Tehran

Religion
- Affiliation: Shia Islam
- Ecclesiastical or organisational status: Mosque
- Status: Active

Location
- Location: Tehran, Tehran province
- Country: Iran
- Coordinates: 35°46′36″N 51°27′05″E

Architecture
- Type: Mosque architecture
- Completed: 1327 CE

Specifications
- Dome: One
- Minaret: Two

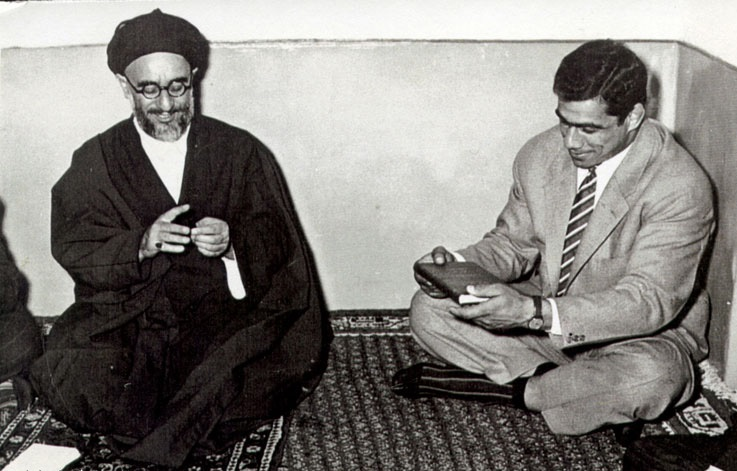
Mahmoud Taleghani gifts Gholamreza Takhti a Quran, Hedayat Mosque, Tehran, 1957

The Hedayat Mosque (Persian: مسجد هدایت; Arabic: مسجد هدايت) is a Shi'ite mosque in Tehran, Iran. Appointed to the mosque in 1948, Ayatollah Mahmoud Taleghani promoted discussion against the Pahlavi regime and the mosque became a center of Iranian religious revolutionary movement between 1950 and 1971, in advance of the Iranian Revolution.

== History ==
The mosque was built in 1327 CE.

In the 20th-century, the mosque became a center for revolutionaries, fighting against the Pahlavi dynasty, supported by Ayatollah Mahmoud Taleghani. Taleghani attracted many people to participate in the programs of the mosque. He invited Ulama and other intellectuals to lecture there. Mohammad-Javad Bahonar lectured on the criticism of the situation of Hijab in Hedayat mosque. Taleghani was forced into exile in 1971 and the SAVAK forced the closure of the mosque in 1972. Taleghani was reinstated to the mosque in 1978.

The mosque was substantially renovated in 2010 and 2011.

== See also ==
- Shia Islam in Iran
- List of mosques in Iran
