= Imam Sadiq University =

Iranian Islamic private university

Coordinates: 35°46′03″N 51°22′57″E

- دانشگاه امام صادق; Danishgāh-i Imām Ṣādiq
- Type: Private
- Established: 1982
- President: Asghar Eftekhari
- Students: 1,110
- Location: Tehran, Tehran Province, Iran
- Campus: Urban
- Website: www.isu.ac.ir

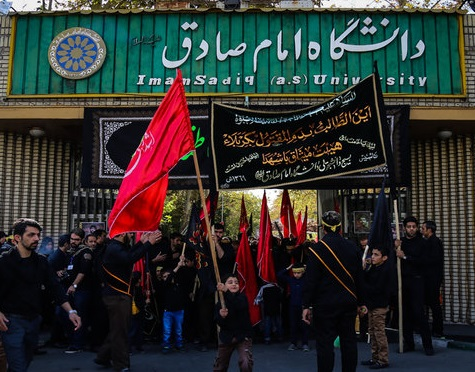
Imam Sadiq University (2016)

The Imam Sadiq University (Persian: دانشگاه امام صادق) is an Islamic private university in Tehran, Iran. Established in 1982, the goal of the university is to combine Islamic research and modern studies, especially humanities. The university was dedicated to training politicians and jurists preaching Islam. Reflecting its commitment to Islamic principles, the university separates educational environments for female and male students.

The university is regarded as one of the universities in Iran that has played a prime role in recruiting politicians and other prime figures in the Islamic Republic of Iran. Imam Sadiq University is significantly more autonomous than other Iranian universities in inviting and employing lecturers, because it is a private organization. Prominent reformist thinkers such as Abdolkarim Soroush, Hossein Bashiriyeh, Javad Tabatabaei have been given space to propound their own ideas in humanities.

The university offers BA, MA, and Ph.D. degrees in political science, economics, Islamic jurisprudence, law (private law, public law, criminal law, international law), management, and communications. It has eight colleges in operation.

== History and evolution ==
=== Before the Iranian Revolution (1969–1979) ===
In 1969, before the Iranian Revolution, Habib Ladjevardi, one of the managers and entrepreneurs of the time, decided to establish and run the Iran Center of Management Studies (ICMS) to train leaders in all economic and industrial fields in collaboration with Harvard University in the US. The "Iran Management Studies Center" was founded, and courses in the field of management were taught under the supervision of Harvard University professors.

Mohammad Taghi Barkhordar, also known as the father of Iran's manufacturing industries, like Habib Lajevardi, paid great attention to management issues and played a significant role in the foundation of Harvard University's branch in Iran. Barkhordar also held a chair on the board of trustees of this university. Additionally, twelve prominent Iranian economic figures, including Siavash Arjomand (Arjomand Industrial Group), Hedayatollah Behbahani (General Industrial Company), Hassan Khosroshahi (Minoo Industrial Group), Mahmoud Rezaei (Sarcheshmeh Copper Company), and Abdol-Ali Mirza Farman Farmaian (Pars Oil), were members of the university's board of trustees. The university building was designed by "Consulting Engineers Abdolaziz Farmanfarmaian and Associates," led by Nader Ardalan.

At this center, based on an intensive curriculum, discussions on 600 topics in various management areas were held with the presence of Iranian professors and Harvard University professors. Most of these discussions were in English. This university was able to deliver several cohorts of management graduates until the Islamic Revolution occurred.

=== After the Iranian Revolution (1979-current) ===
Following the Islamic Revolution, in the course of property and asset confiscations, all properties, factories, and companies belonging to 53 capitalists and industrialists, including the Lajevardi family and Mohammad Ali Barkhordar, as well as board members such as the Arjomand brothers, the Rezaei brothers, the Khosroshahi family, and Abdolali Farmanfarmaian, were confiscated by the revolutionaries. Members of the Lajevardi family, including Habib, were forced to leave Iran due to attacks by revolutionary groups.

With the revolution, Imam Sadiq University became the first university to be established in Iran after the 1979 revolution and during the Cultural Revolution. In 1982, the university began operations by seizing the "Harvard" institute, renaming it "Imam Sadiq", changing its board of trustees and professors, its curriculum and educational structure, and transferring its ownership to Hossein-Ali Montazeri.

After the revolution, the assets and factories of individuals like Habib Ladjevardi, Mohammad Taghi Barkhordar, and some other members of the board of trustees were confiscated by the revolutionaries, and the "Harvard" institute was seized. Its name was changed to "Imam Sadiq," and its management was handed over to Hossein-Ali Montazeri, who appointed Mohammad-Reza Mahdavi Kani as his representative there.

Initially, the university aspired to cultivate an environment of intellectual diversity, welcoming students and faculty from both conservative and reformist backgrounds. However, by the late 2000s, the institution witnessed a significant constriction in the scope of its debates. Faculty members holding unconventional perspectives began to depart from the university, a process exacerbated by the purging of professors deemed 'unclean.' This led to their replacement by less-established instructors, many of whom were distinguished graduates of the same university, thus marking a shift towards a more homogeneous intellectual environment.

== Leadership ==
Until mid-2014, Mohammad-Reza Mahdavi Kani was the head of this institution. After his death, his son Mohammad-Saeed Mahdavi Kani took over the presidency of the university for three years until 9 October 2018.

On 9 October 2018, by decree of the board of trustees headed by Sadiq Larijani, Hossein-Ali Saadi, a member of the Assembly of Experts, was appointed as the president of Imam Sadiq University for a three-year term.

Asghar Eftekhari, a previous Imam Sadeqi of the class of 2003, has been the current president since 2024.

== Selection criteria ==
After passing the written exam stage, which is conducted through the nationwide entrance exam, the university's selection unit selects students based on religious, scientific, moral, and political criteria. This selection stage, in addition to the face-to-face interview, includes field research of the candidate's place of residence and examination of their political, cultural, and social records.

In general, the university's selection process considers three criteria for admitting students:

1. Scientific criterion: Students who have a pre-university diploma in all three main subjects of the entrance exam and achieve a relatively good rank in the nationwide entrance exam qualify for the interview stage.
2. Interview criterion: Students who meet the scientific criterion are invited for a face-to-face interview at the university. In this selection stage, the candidate's scientific ability (Arabic and English language proficiency and general knowledge), political, cultural, social, and religious tendencies and beliefs are assessed. The university considers itself committed solely to religious teachings and the ideals of the Supreme Leader of the Islamic Revolution, Ruhollah Khomeini.
3. Local investigations criterion: After achieving a passing score in the interview, the candidate's file enters the local character investigation and vetting process.

After reviewing these three criteria, a total score is assigned to each candidate, which will be the final basis for student admission.

== Teaching and structure ==
Since the inception of the university, a significant portion of the curriculum for all university majors has been dedicated to seminary and Islamic studies courses; meaning, in addition to specialized courses in their fields, all students at this university also study subjects such as Arabic grammar, Islamic Jurisprudence, Sharia Law, contemplation and interpretation of the Quran, philosophy, ethics, and Islamic thought (centered on the books of Morteza Motahhari).

Nearly every academic department within the university incorporates the term "Islamic teachings" at the outset of its name, such as "Islamic teachings and law" or "Islamic teachings and economics." Earning a bachelor's degree requires students to demonstrate proficiency in Arabic and a deep understanding of Islam.

== Funding and finances ==
Imam Sadiq University is a private university that finances itself through investments from the powerful religious foundation Astan Quds Razavi, the Imam Sadiq Community Holding, the textile factories of the community, the confiscated pharmaceutical factory of Loghman, Milad-e Nour shopping centre in Tehran, government aids, and a number of merchants in Tehran. Although this university is considered private by the Ministry of Science, it does not charge any tuition fees from its students, and welfare facilities like dormitories in the brothers' unit are free of charge.

== Student life and regulation ==
In discussing the university's approach to student discipline and moral education, an interview with Mostafa Mirlouhi sheds light on the stance of Mohammad Reza Mahdavi Kani, one of the institution's influential figures. Mirlouhi recounts Kani's opposition to students commuting from Tehran, emphasizing the importance of a controlled environment for maintaining the desired educational and moral standards. According to Mirlouhi, Kani likened the development of a student's character to the careful cultivation of a flower, requiring support and protection against potentially corrupting influences encountered outside the university's confines.

== Alumni and influence ==
Traditionally, graduates from Imam Sadiq University, commonly referred to as Imam Sadiqis, have secured influential positions through their involvement with state-run radio and television channels, which are managed by the Islamic Republic of Iran Broadcasting (IRIB). Initially, these graduates would establish a presence within the broadcasting corporation's news department, eventually progressing to higher roles involved in executive cultural policy-making. Notably, Peyman Jebelli, an alumnus of the university, was appointed as the head of IRIB by the supreme leader Ayatollah Ali Khamenei.

=== Khatami's administration (1997-2005) ===
Apart from Abdollah Ramezanzadeh, the spokesman for the Reform Government, Imam Sadiqis were rarely noticed in Khatami's era. During this period, there was little inclination to use individuals who, in the minds of government decision-makers, represented a particular spectrum of thought.

At the beginning of Khatami's first presidential term, there were many of the Imam Sadiqis in the Ministry of Foreign Affairs, but with Khatami's presence at the helm of the country, most of them were removed. However, after a period, they were again invited to higher positions and, in a way, regained their position in the Ministry of Foreign Affairs.

Towards the end of Khatami's presidency, after 17 to 18 years since the inception of the university, its graduates reached the maturity level required for management and became ready to enter the realm of middle management in the country.

=== Ahmadinejad's administration (2005-2013) ===
Following Mahmoud Ahmadinejad's victory in the 2005 presidential election, Imam Sadiq University alumni, known as Imam Sadiqis, significantly expanded their presence within the Iranian government. This broader integration is largely attributed to the extensive and coordinated campaign efforts by Imam Sadiq students nationwide. It was the only university that postponed its end-of-term exams for more than a week. This allowed students to travel voluntarily and at their own expense to the farthest parts of the country for campaign efforts on behalf of Ahmadinejad. Consequently, the incoming administration welcomed these university graduates into prominent positions across different sectors. Statement of Salehabadi, the head of the Securities and Exchange Organization, alongside Individuals like Zahedi Vafa, the senior deputy of the Minister of Economy, Mojtaba Kabari, the CEO of Pasargad Bank, Khodam, his deputy, Ghasemi, the CEO of Kerman Cement Investment, Ameri, the CEO of Industrial Investment Insurance Company, Abdulrahimian, the Investment Manager of Saipa Investment, and several managers from the Securities and Exchange Organization and regional stock exchange managers are other examples. The most notable among them was Saeed Jalili, an alumnus, who was named the secretary of the Supreme National Security Council and served as Ahmadinejad's principal negotiator on nuclear issues.

=== Rouhani's administration (2013-2021) ===
Upon Hassan Rouhani's ascension to the presidency in 2013, his government prioritized the recruitment of alumni from international universities and technocrats without explicit ideological affiliations. However, this approach did not entirely exclude graduates from Imam Sadiq University. For example, Rouhani appointed Hesamoddin Ashna, a communications professor at Imam Sadiq, as his advisor. Nonetheless, Ashna was later compelled to resign following controversial disclosures from an interview leak involving Mohammad Javad Zarif, the then-foreign minister, who critiqued Ashna for his involvement in military political interventions.

=== Raisi's administration (2021-2024) ===
Raisi's victory in the 2021 presidential election, attributed to his uncontested candidacy due to the clerical establishment's sidelining of significant rivals, led him to emphasize the selection of "revolutionary" personnel for his administration. This allowed Imam Sadiq University to play a significant role in verifying such revolutionary credentials for cabinet positions.

Within Raisi's team, two young ministers, Ehsan Khandouzi of finance and economic affairs, and Hojjatollah Abdolmaleki of cooperatives, labor, and social welfare, haiedl from Imam Sadiq University. Both ministers, who graduated before the ideological shifts of the 2000s, with Abdolmaleki embracing more dogmatic stances. Additionally, Meysam Latifi, a faculty member known for his stringent views from the same university, was appointed to lead the Administrative and Recruitment Affairs Organization, poised to further recruit Imam Sadiq alumni.

Raisi also appointed Gholam Hossein Esmaili, an ally and Imam Sadiq alumnus, as his chief of staff, alongside Mohammad Hosseini, a former culture minister under Ahmadinejad and now vice president for parliamentary affairs. Ali Bagheri, another Imam Sadiq graduate with a history in nuclear negotiations and known for his staunch positions, served as a deputy foreign minister and a senior nuclear negotiator.

While Imam Sadiq alumni enjoy a special rapport with the Islamic Revolutionary Guard Corps and the Supreme Leader's office, some of the younger graduates in the current administration are viewed not just as conservatives based on their academic achievements but as radical revolutionaries, unyielding in their convictions.

== Notable alumni ==
- Ali Latifiyan, researcher, social-political theorist and Human rights activist
- Mohammad Sarafraz, previous head of IRIB
- Mohsen Esmaeili, jurist and member of the Guardian Council
- Kazim Jalali, MP, former diplomat
- Ruhollah Ahmadzadeh, former vice president and head of Cultural Heritage and Tourism Organization, the youngest provincial governor in Iran
- Abdollah Ramezanzadeh, politician
- Mostafa Kavakebian, politician
- Mohammad Ali Hosseini, deputy minister of Foreign Affairs and Ambassador to Italy
- Kamaladin Pirmoazzen
- Hesamodin Ashna, cultural and press advisor to President Hassan Rouhani
- Ghazanfar Roknabadi, ambassador to Lebanon
- Ali Mohammad Moadab, poet

== Address ==
imam Sadiq University is a university in Tehran that has two separate campuses for male and female students.

Male Campus: The male campus is located in Tehran, in the Pal-e Modiriyat area of Saadatabad. Educational and research facilities at this campus are provided specifically for male students.

Female Campus: The female campus is situated near the male campus, in the Shahr-e Gharb area, Farahzadi Boulevard, Shahid Taherkhani Street. This campus offers educational programs specifically for female students.

== Tuition ==
Imam Sadiq University is a government-affiliated institution established to train personnel committed to revolutionary and Islamic values for roles in the public sector. The university partially funds its operations through government allocations and revenues from its economic activities.

Students do not pay tuition fees for access to educational facilities and services. During their studies, they may also receive financial aid or scholarships.

== See also ==
- Higher education in Iran
- List of universities in Iran
