= 2026 Mashhad massacre =

- Part of 2025-2026 Iranian protests
- Location: Mashhad, Iran
- Date: (Main) 8 & 9 Jan 2026
- Victims: 400-Thousands; At least 1800
- Perpetrator: Iranian government

2026 Mashhad massacre was a massacre in the city of Mashhad that occurred during the 2025-2026 Iranian protests. The protests began on 28 December from Reza Bazaar, following a widespread merchants’ strike in Tehran, and saw scattered demonstrations that reached their peak on 8–11 January.

The killings were carried out in an organized manner starting from 8 January across extensive areas, including Haft-e Tir Boulevard, Vakilabad Boulevard and its branching boulevards, Hashemiyeh Bridge, Azadi Square, the central IRIB of Khorasan Razavi (Palestine sq), Daneshjo neighborhood, Faramarz Abbasi, Qasemabad, Sayyad Shirazi Boulevard, Piroozi Intersection, Toos Boulevard, Seyedi, North and South Tabarsi Boulevard, Amir Alley, the Old Road, Imamieh Square, Shariati Intersection, Milad Intersection, and Ahmadabad neighborhood.

== Massacre ==
Protesters held scattered gatherings in markets and some city squares, and protesters had been arrested in the days leading up to the events. With the start of the call to protest on January 6, people gradually began gathering at key locations across the city. By 8 p.m. on January 8, scattered groups from side streets were joining one another on the main roads, and the crowds reached their peak at 11 p.m.

After some time, agents of the Islamic Republic began firing in an organized manner. On Haft-e Tir Boulevard, it is estimated that more than 200 people were killed over these two days. The protesters were fired upon from Police Station 28 on Haft-e Tir and from the rooftop of the Armitage Tower. Witnesses described Vakilabad and Haft-e Tir streets as “covered in blood.” According to eyewitnesses, the crackdown was more severe in the Mellat Park and Shandiz areas.

Tear gas and chemical agents were used on Jalal Al-e Ahmad and Danesh-Amuz streets, near Vakilabad Boulevard. Extensive killings were reported on Tous Boulevard, Fajr Bridge, Tabarsi, Ahmadabad, and Chenaran. Security forces raided the homes of people who had sheltered protesters and, threatening them with G3 rifles and pistols, abducted protesters. Chemical tear gas was deployed in various areas, including Jalal Al-e Ahmad and Milad Intersection, and security forces carried out killings of protesters using carpet-cutting blades, utility knives, automatic gunfire, drones, and machine guns.

According to an eyewitness, after the shooting began on Honarestan Boulevard, much of the crowd scattered. Some took refuge at Javad al-A'immeh Heart Hospital, while others sought shelter in residential parking garages. Razavi Hospital and private clinics also witnessed the mistreatment of the wounded and war crimes committed by security forces.

== Aftermath ==
The bridge in front of the central building of the Islamic Republic of Iran Broadcasting in Razavi Khorasan Province.

According to official figures released by the Islamic Republic of Iran, the death toll was estimated at 400. Unofficial sources, however, estimated that thousands of people had been killed.Beginning on January 10, a heavy security atmosphere prevailed across the city, with checkpoints established in various areas, security agents patrolling on motorcycles, and an atmosphere of fear and intimidation.

Donald Trump, President of the United States, posted images of the gatherings on Truth Social and wrote: “More than one million people have gathered in this city, and Iran's second-largest city is under the control of protesters.” According to him, “Government forces have left the city.”

On February 18, 2026, following the January killings, a 40th-day memorial ceremony for the protesters was held at Behesht Reza Cemetery. Dozens of graves had no headstones.

Abbas Araghchi, Iran's foreign minister, said on a program called The Story of War 2 that the Islamic Republic had not been prepared for widespread protests. As Donald Trump had reportedly stated some time earlier, Mashhad had “fallen” for five hours.
