= Tayebeh Siavoshi =

Iranian politician

Tayyebeh Siavoshi
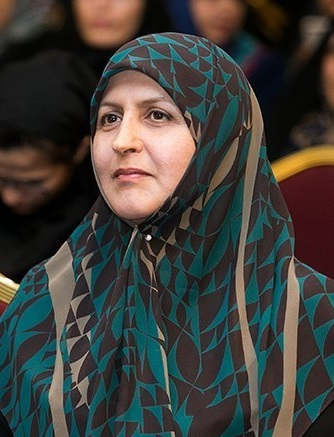

Member of the Parliament of Iran
- In office 28 May 2016 – 26 May 2020
- Constituency: Tehran, Rey, Shemiranat and Eslamshahr
- Majority: 1,128,370 (34.75%)

Personal details
- Born: Tayyebeh Siavoshi Shah-Enayati c. 1966 (age 59–60) Shemiranat County, Iran
- Party: List of Hope
- Education: University of Tehran
- Profession: Foreign policy analyst
- Website: http://tayebehsiavashi.ir

Tayyebeh Siavoshi Shah-Enayati (Persian: طیبه سیاوشی شاه‌عنایتی) is an Iranian reformist politician who was a member of the Parliament of Iran representing Tehran, Rey, Shemiranat and Eslamshahr electoral district, from 2016 to 2020.

== Career ==
Siavoshi is an international relations expert in Ministry of Foreign Affairs and Institute for Political and International Studies.

=== Electoral history ===
| Year | Election | Votes | % | Rank | Notes |
|---|---|---|---|---|---|
| 2016 | Parliament | 1,128,370 | 34.75% | 23rd | Won |
