= Electoral history of Saeed Jalili =

Saeed Jalili electoral history and positions

This is a summary of the electoral history of Saeed Jalili, an Iranian Principlist politician who was Secretary of the Supreme National Security Council (2007–2013).

== Parliamentary elections ==
=== 2004 ===
He ran from Mashhad and lost.

=== 2008 ===
He ran from Mashhad and lost.

== Presidential election ==
=== 2013 ===
Jalili finished third with 4,168,946 votes (11.36%).

=== 2021 ===
He withdrew in favor of Raisi.

=== 2024 ===
He lost in a run off election.
