= Iran Experts Initiative =

Iran led worldwide influence program

The Iran Experts Initiative (IEI) was a project Iranian Foreign Ministry officials initiated in 2014. According to reports in Semafor and Iran International, based on purported leaked emails, the initiative was used to "promote Tehran's arguments in the west". Members of the Iran Experts Initiative worked as academics and researchers for think tanks in the West, and gave advice to Europe and the U.S. According to a report by Iran International, the project consisted of "an influence network formed and guided by Tehran".

== Leaked emails ==
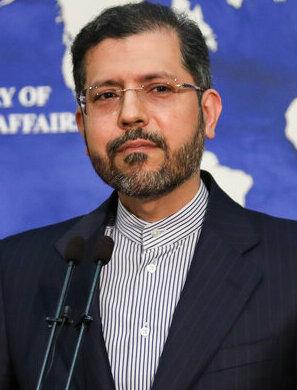
Saeed Khatibzadeh, 2021

In 2014 Saeed Khatibzadeh proposed the formation of the IEI with the goal of placing second-generation Iranians affiliated with Western think-tanks and academic institutions into "American and European think tanks" and offering them "political support."

In September 2023, the London-based Persian-language news television channel Iran International and the news website Semafor obtained leaked foreign ministry emails in which Iranian government officials claimed credit for assembling a network of Western scholars called the Iran Experts Initiative.

According to the reports, the thousands of emails describe an effort by Iran's Foreign Ministry "to improve Tehran's image abroad". The reports also said Iran sought to build international ties with influential academics and researchers.

== Contact with Tehran ==
Iranian diplomat Saeed Khatibzadeh wrote a letter in 2014 to Mostafa Zahrani (head of Iran's Foreign Ministry think tank) saying that the core members of the IEI had been selected. IEI members reportedly communicated with Iranian officials.

== Investigation ==
Pentagon official and academic Ariane Tabatabai has been linked to the Iran Experts Initiative.

House Armed Services Committee Chairman Mike Rogers expressed "deep concern with the Department [of Defense]'s hiring of Ariane Tabatabai". State Department spokesman Matt Miller said that the report "looked like an account of things that happened almost a decade ago", while Intelligence and Special Operations Subcommittee Chairman Jack Bergman said Tabatabai's "close ties" to the Iranian government "should disqualify her for a position in such a sensitive area as special operations and low-intensity conflict."

The Pentagon launched an investigation following the reports.

In October 2023, after a review, Tabatabai retained her top-secret security clearance. Two weeks later, the Pentagon released a statement confirming that "Dr. Tabatabai was thoroughly and properly vetted" as a condition of her employment with the Department of Defense.

== See also ==
- Institute for Political and International Studies
- Leaked Mohammad Javad Zarif audiotape
