= Abbas Araghchi =

Iranian diplomat (born 1962)

Seyyed Abbas Araghchi
- عباس عراقچی
- Araghchi in 2026

Minister of Foreign Affairs
- Incumbent
- Assumed office 21 August 2024
- President: Masoud Pezeshkian
- Preceded by: Ali Bagheri Kani (acting)

Acting Spokesperson for the Ministry of Foreign Affairs
- In office 11 May 2013 – 28 August 2013
- President: Mahmoud Ahmadinejad
- Preceded by: Ramin Mehmanparast
- Succeeded by: Marzieh Afkham
Ambassador roles
Ambassador of Iran to Japan
In office 4 January 2008 – October 2011
President	Mahmoud Ahmadinejad
Preceded by	Mohsen Talaei
Succeeded by	Majid Matlabi Shabestari (acting)
Ambassador of Iran to Finland Accredited Ambassador to Estonia
In office 19 December 1999 – 6 September 2003
President	Mohammad Khatami
Preceded by	Mahmoud Boroujerdi
Succeeded by	Javad Kachoueian

Personal details
- Born: 5 December 1962 (age 63) Tehran
- Spouse: Arezoo Ahmadvand
- Children: 3
- Education: School of International Relations; Islamic Azad University; University of Kent (PhD)
- Awards: Order of Merit

Military service
- Allegiance: Iran
- Branch: (Islamic Revolutionary Guard Corps) IRGC
- Service years: 1979–1988
- Conflict: Iran–Iraq War

Abbas Araghchi (Note: Persian: عباس عراقچی [ʔæbˌbɒːse æɾɒːˈɢtʃi]) (Note: Also spelled Araqchi,) (born 5 December 1962) is an Iranian diplomat and politician who has served as the foreign minister of Iran since August 2024.

Araghchi had served for nine years with the Islamic Revolutionary Guard Corps (IRGC) during the Iran–Iraq War. He had also served as the Iranian ambassador to Estonia 1999–2003); the Iranian ambassador to Finland; and as the Iranian ambassador to Japan (2008–2011).

For a handful of months in 2013, he acted as the Spokesperson for the Ministry of Foreign Affairs of Iran.

== Early life and family ==
Araghchi was born on 5 December 1962 in Tehran to a Persian family. He has three sisters and three brothers. His father and grandfather were both carpet traders. His father died when he was 17. His two older brothers hold notable positions; one is a member of the Board of Directors of the Iran Carpet Exporters' Union, and the other is a member of the Carpet Sellers Union. As a teenager, he took part in the 1979 Iranian Revolution.

His nephew Ahmad Araghchi was the Central Bank of Iran's deputy governor in charge of foreign exchange, but was dismissed from his post and subsequently arrested in 2018 amid an investigation into Iran's currency crisis. In 2019, Ahmad Araghchi was living in the United States.

Araghchi was first married to Bahareh Abdollahian. They have two sons and a daughter, but they divorced. He subsequently married his second wife, Arezoo Ahmadvand.

== Education ==
Araghchi earned a bachelor's degree in Iran in international relations from the School of International Relations, run by the Ministry of Foreign Affairs. He then obtained a master's degree in political science in 1991 from the Islamic Azad University in Tehran. Additionally, Araghchi holds a Ph.D. in political thought in 1996 from the University of Kent with a thesis entitled The Evolution of the Concept of Political Participation in Twentieth-Century Islamic Political Thought (1996). He was supervised by David McLellan, a scholar of Marxism. He is fluent in Persian, Arabic and English.

== Military career ==
Araghchi joined the Islamic Revolutionary Guard Corps (IRGC). He served in the IRGC for nine years, and fought in the Iran–Iraq War.

== Political career ==
=== 1989–2005 ===
Araghchi joined Iran's foreign ministry in 1989. In 1992, he served as chargé d'affaires at Iran's permanent mission to the Organisation of Islamic Cooperation, based in Jeddah, Saudi Arabia, and in 1998–99 as director general of the Institute for Political and International Studies (IPIS) of Iran's Foreign Ministry in Tehran. From 1999 to 2003, he was ambassador to Finland. He was dean of the School of International Relations of Iran's Foreign Ministry in Tehran from 2004 to 2005.

=== 2005–2017 ===
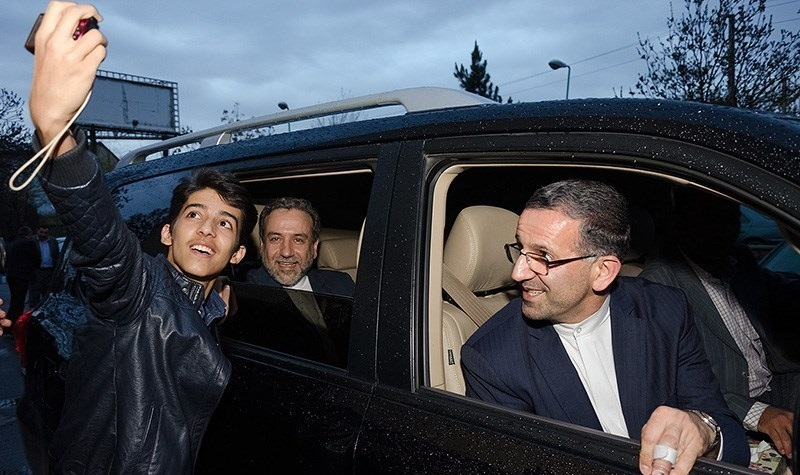
Araghchi in 2016, as Deputy FM

Araghchi served as deputy foreign minister for legal and international affairs from 2005 to 2007. From 2008 to 2011, he was ambassador to Japan. Between 2011 and 2013, he held the post of deputy foreign minister for Asia–Pacific and the Commonwealth Affairs.

In 2013, he again became deputy foreign minister for legal and international affairs and also served as the spokesperson for the ministry. Araghchi acted as Iran's chief nuclear negotiator starting in 2013 in talks with the UN's P5+1, under president Hassan Rouhani leading up to the 2015 Joint Comprehensive Plan of Action between Iran and the United States; the US withdrew from the plan in 2018.

=== 2017–24 ===
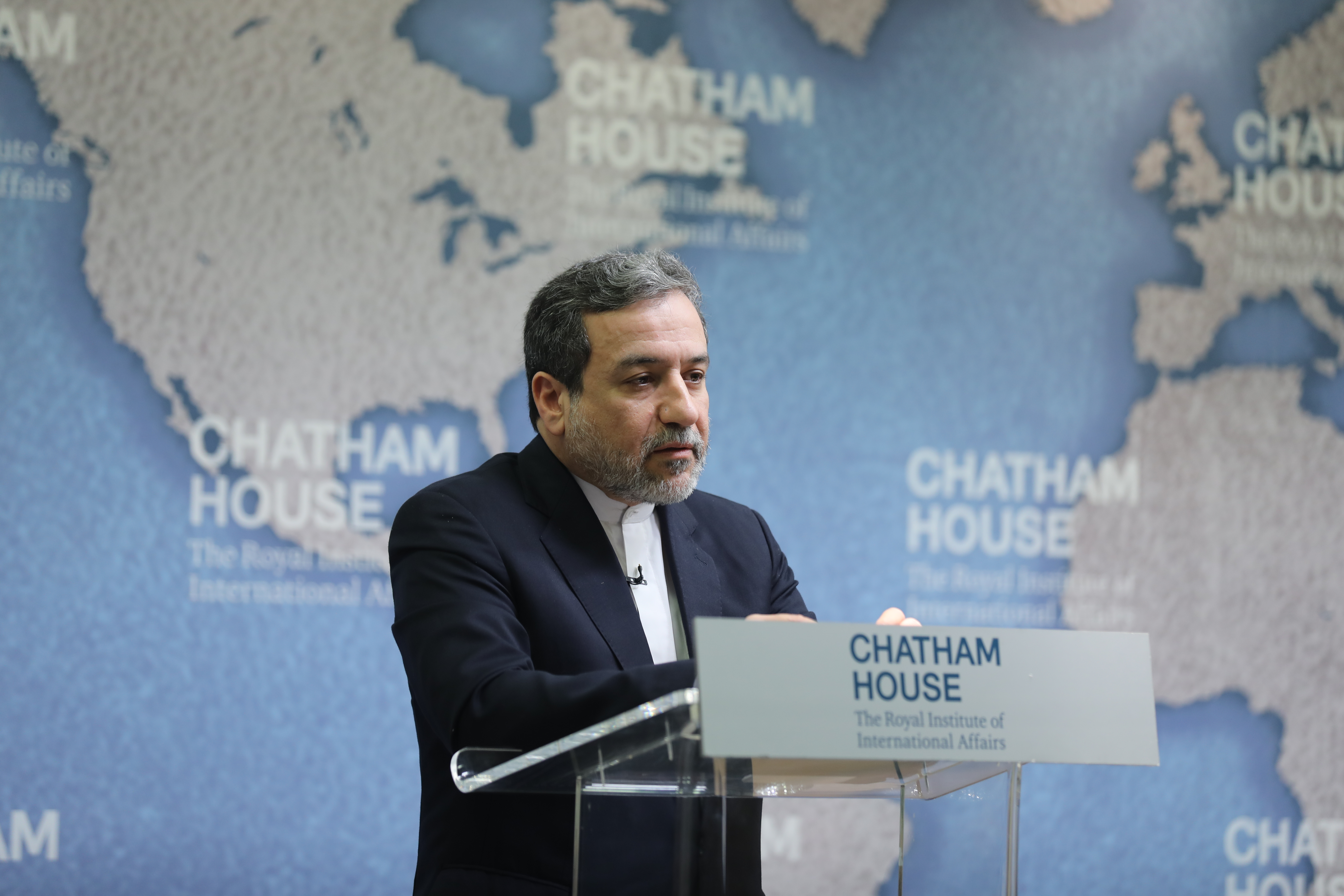
Araghchi in 2018

From 2017 to 2021, he served as political deputy at the foreign ministry. In August 2021, Araghchi was replaced as deputy foreign minister for political affairs and chief nuclear negotiator by Ali Bagheri Kani, following the inauguration of president Ebrahim Raisi. State media reported that Araghchi's role was reduced to that of ministry adviser, a move analysts viewed as signalling a shift toward a more hardline approach in Iran's nuclear policy.

Following his removal from the foreign ministry, Araghchi briefly withdrew from public life. In October 2021 he was appointed by council chairman Kamal Kharrazi as secretary of the Strategic Council on Foreign Relations, an advisory body to the Office of the Supreme Leader of Iran. The appointment, viewed as unexpected by observers, restored his influence in foreign policy circles and positioned him closer to Supreme Leader Ali Khamenei's inner circle.

=== Foreign minister (2024–present) ===
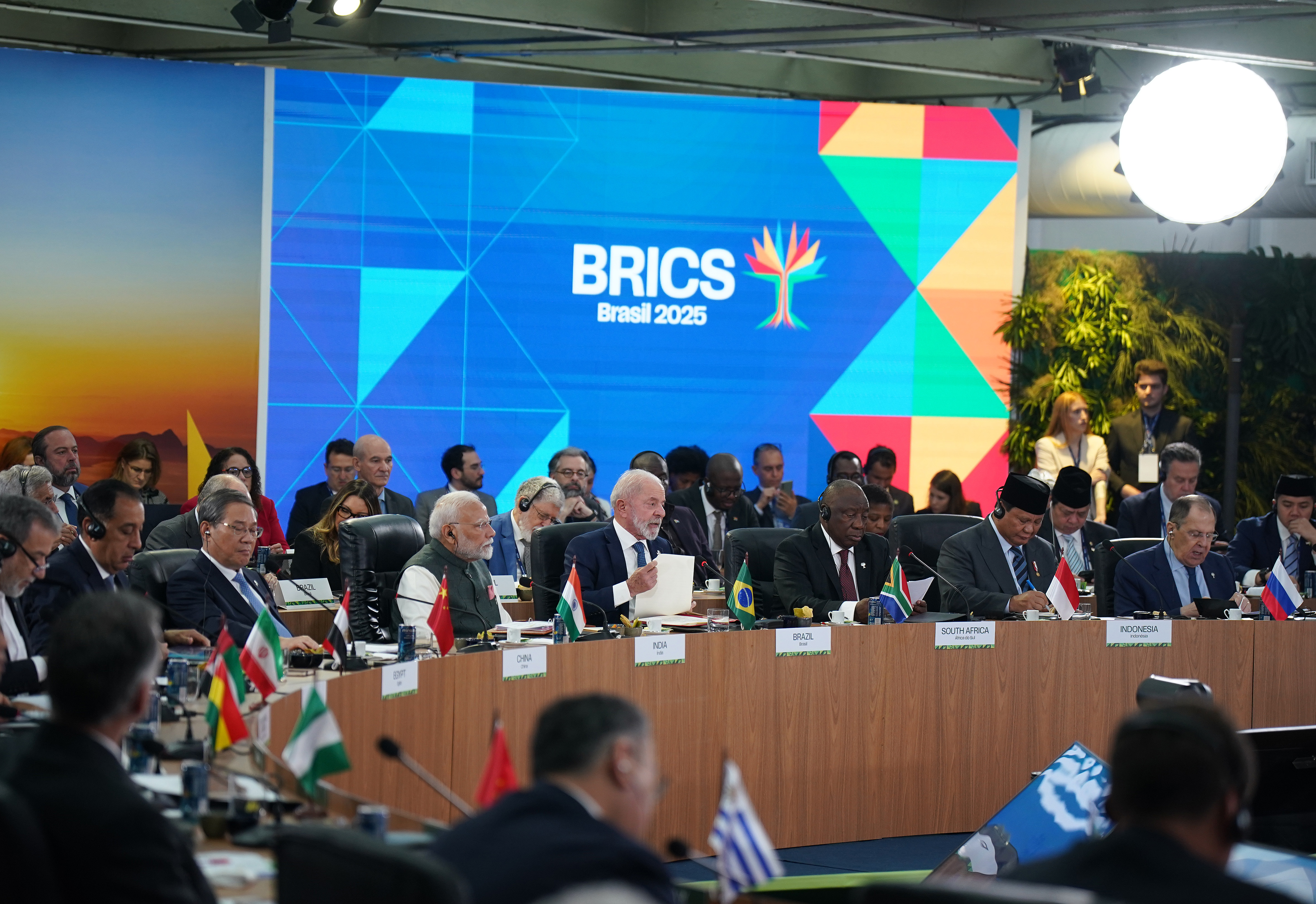
Araghchi (far left) at the 17th BRICS summit in Rio de Janeiro, Brazil, 7 July 2025

Araghchi was nominated to be president Masoud Pezeshkian's foreign minister on 11 August 2024. He eventually became Minister of Foreign Affairs following approval by the Islamic Consultative Assembly on 21 August.

On 7 October 2024, on the one-year anniversary of the October 7 attack on Israel by Hamas, Araghchi's foreign ministry issued a statement praising the attack. It stated: 'The operation on October 7, 2023... was a turning point in the history of the legitimate struggle of the Palestinian people against the occupation and oppression of the Zionist regime."

Araghchi visited Syria on 1 December 2024. He asserted that: “the Syrian Army will ... be victorious over [the anti-Assad regime forces].” However, just seven days later, on 8 December 2024, Syrian President Bashar Assad’s government collapsed.

Later that month he said that "2025 will be an important year regarding Iran's nuclear issue." This came as a reaction to Donald Trump's soon to start role as the new US president; talks of new economic sanctions; an inflation rate of 35% in Iran; and the Iranian rial's reaching an all-time low of 820,500 to the dollar.

In January 2025, Araghchi met with Taliban leaders in Afghanistan. He became the first Iranian foreign minister to visit Afghanistan since 2017, and the first to visit since the Taliban takeover in 2021. In April 2025, Araghchi was involved in indirect negotiations with the United States about Iran's nuclear program.

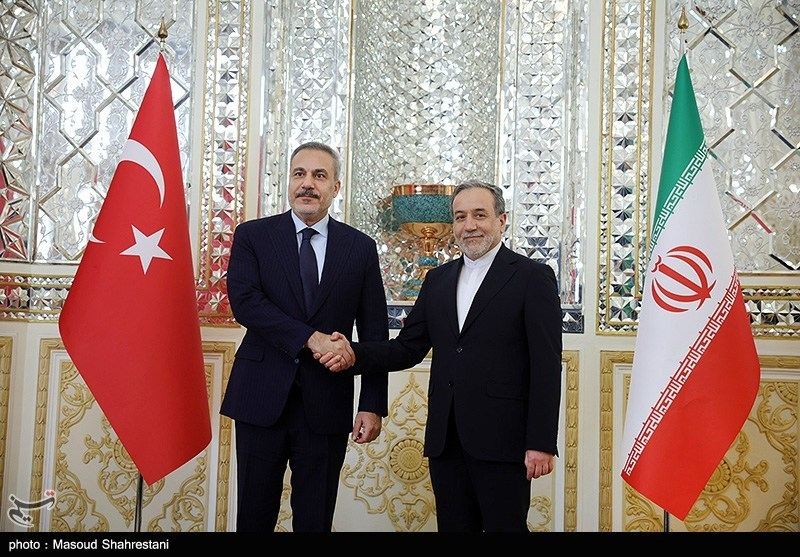
Araghchi with Turkish Foreign Minister Hakan Fidan in November 2025

In late January 2025, Araghchi met with Hamas leadership following a ceasefire agreement in the Gaza war, to "hail the victory" of Hamas. In September 2025, US President Donald Trump proposed that Iran might eventually join the Abraham Accords entered into by Israel and four Arab countries, presenting this as a potential pathway to regional peace in the aftermath of a Gaza peace plan in the Israel-Hamas conflict. Araghchi firmly rejected these remarks, describing them as "wishful thinking." He said that Iran would never recognize what he characterized as an "occupying regime" responsible for acts of genocide.

==== Crackdown on 2025–26 Iranian protests ====
During the 2025–2026 Iranian protests, which were met with brutal repression by the Iranian government, reportedly killing thousands of protesters, Araghchi claimed that Iran had "witnessed violent acts and terrorism in the style of the Islamic State," framing the protests as having been "sabotaged by terrorist elements." In an interview with NBC News on 28 February 2026, he maintained that the Islamic Republic had tolerated peaceful protests which were subsequently hijacked by 'terrorists' who even shot at the peaceful protestors themselves, prompting the Islamic Republic's security agencies to respond accordingly. He asserted that the peaceful protestors who died as a consequence of such terrorist activities were considered 'martyrs' by the Islamic Republic's government. He criticized US statements on human rights in Iran, labeling them as "misleading and shameful." When German Chancellor Friedrich Merz and other European leaders, including French President Emmanuel Macron and British Prime Minister Keir Starmer, condemned the violent crackdown on protesters, Araghchi responded by accusing Germany of having "blatant double standards" concerning its recent support for Israel during the Gaza war, asserting that this stance "obliterated any shred of credibility."

Araghchi referenced a fatal law enforcement shooting in Minneapolis to deflect international criticism of Iran's crackdown on anti-government protests. He criticized the U.S. government, asserting that it lacks moral authority to condemn Iran's domestic security measures while American agents are responsible for killings in U.S. cities.

In mid-January 2026, reports emerged that Araghchi sent a personal message to Steve Witkoff, the U.S. Special Envoy to the Middle East, saying that Iran had canceled the planned execution of 800 anti-government protesters. This communication reportedly played a key role in dissuading President Donald Trump from ordering immediate military strikes against Iran.

On 21 January 2026, he stated that 3,117 people had been killed during the anti-government protests and the subsequent crackdown. However, external organizations and independent officials assert that the actual death toll is significantly higher. Araghchi criticized Miriam Adelson for saying that Iran had been hiding executions that it carried out.

==== World Economic Forum ====
In January 2026, the World Economic Forum officially rescinded its invitation to Araghchi for the annual summit in Davos due to Iran's crackdown on protests. Araghchi blamed political pressure from Israel and its U.S. allies for the cancellation, calling the decision a result of "lies".

On 23 January 2026, Araghchi publicly insulted Ukrainian President Volodymyr Zelenskyy, calling him a "confused clown" in a post on X. The escalation was triggered by Zelenskyy's speech at the World Economic Forum in Davos on 22 January, in which he criticized the Iranian government's crackdown on domestic protests and called for international intervention.

==== 2026 Iran war ====
In early February 2026, Araghchi stated that Iran would not agree to stop enriching uranium entirely. He also said that Iran would not negotiate about its ballistic missile program or its network of non-state allies, calling demands to discuss them "absolutely" off the table.

On 25 February 2026, Araghchi said that a "historic" agreement with the United States to avert military conflict was "within reach" ahead of renewed talks in Geneva. He wrote that diplomacy must be prioritized to avoid further escalation. During high tensions and a significant US military buildup in the region, Araghchi wrote on social media that Iran held a "crystal clear" position against developing nuclear weapons, while defending its right to peaceful nuclear technology.

Following the start of the 2026 Iran war on 28 February 2026, Araghchi condemned the attacks as "wholly unprovoked, illegal, and illegitimate", and said that Iran maintained a right to self-defense. On 9 March, speaking to PBS News Hour, Araghchi called the American strikes "a failure" while vowing that Iran would fight "as long as it takes".

On 14 March 2026, Araghchi acknowledged the "good cooperation" of Russia and of China with Iran in the war. He noted that the two countries were aiding Iran in the war effort including by providing "military cooperation."

After the announcement of the 2026 Iran war ceasefire, Araghchi participated in peace talks held in Islamabad on 11 April 2026. These talks were face-to-face talks with one of the most high-level delegations sent by the United States.

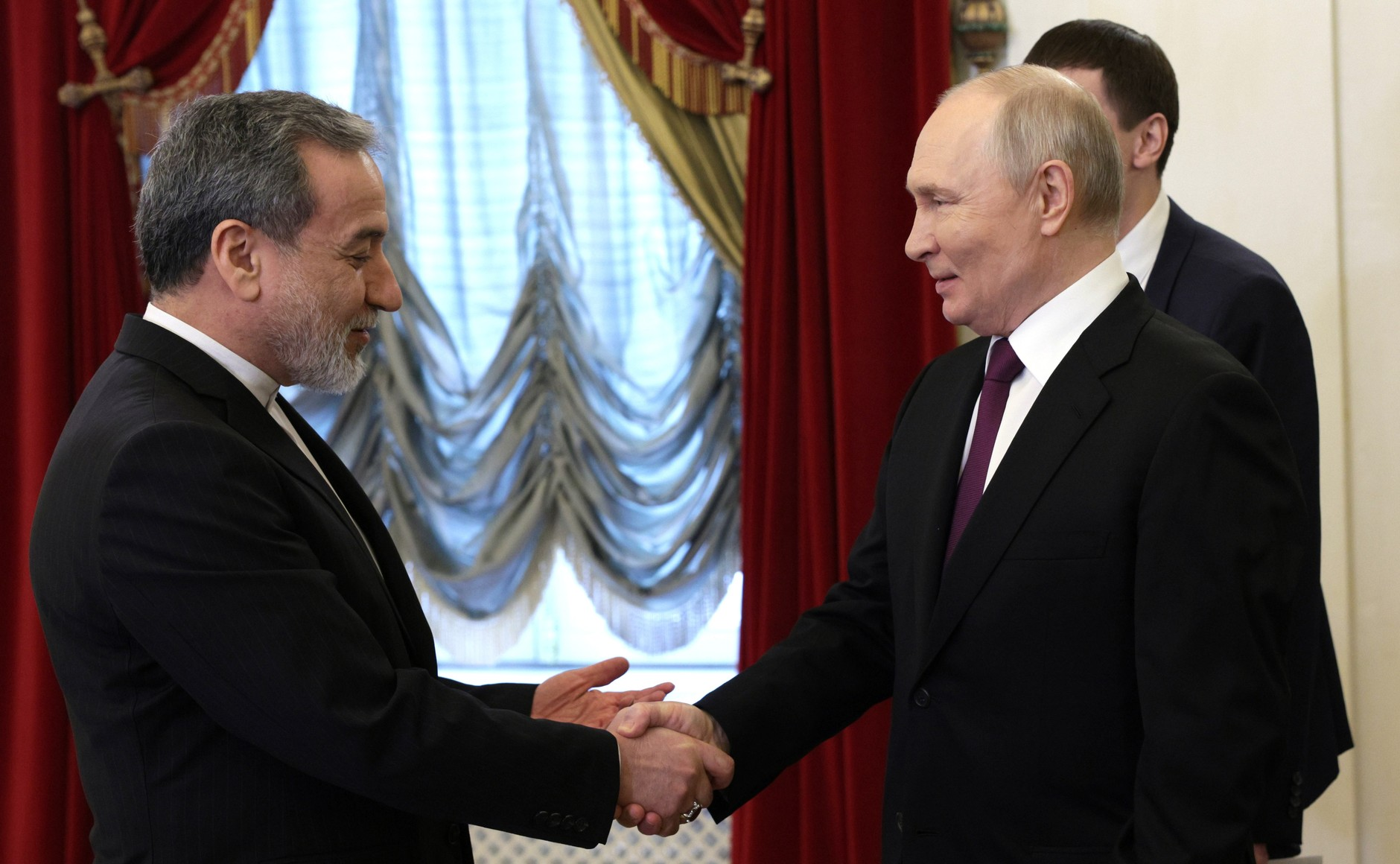
President of the Russian Federation, Vladimir Putin with Araghchi in 2026

On 27 April 2026, Araghchi met with Russia's President Vladimir Putin in Moscow to discuss the war. Russia has supplied military intelligence to Iran, including satellite imagery showing the locations of U.S. warships and military personnel, according to American officials.

On 13 June 2026, Iranian hardliners chanted against Araghchi and Parliament Speaker and chief negotiator Mohammad Bagher Ghalibaf as they protested the deal with the United States outside the Iran Foreign Ministry office.

== Writing ==
Araghchi's doctoral thesis argued that modern Islamic political thought has attempted to reconcile the doctrine of absolute supreme divine sovereignty with the concept of popular sovereignty by incorporating to the extent possible aspects of Western democratic theory into interpretation of Islamic principles, thereby developing a basis for democratic institutions within the framework of Islamic law; at the same time, rejecting the concept of liberal democracy.

Araghchi has written books and articles in relation to diplomacy and international relations, including Negotiations: the Power of Diplomacy published in 2024 (translated into English in 2025 as The Power of Negotiation).

== Awards and honors ==
- Order of the Rising Sun, 2nd class (Japan, 2022)

== See also ==
- List of Iranian officials

== Notes ==
Diplomatic posts
New title Office established	Permanent Representative of Iran to the OIC; Acting; 1991	Succeeded by Sabbah Zanganeh
Preceded by Mahmoud Boroujerdi	Ambassador of Iran to Finland; Accredited Ambassador to Estonia; 1999–2003	Succeeded by Javad Kachoueian
Preceded by Mohsen Talaei	Ambassador of Iran to Japan; 2008–2011	Succeeded by Majid Matlabi Shabestari; Acting
Preceded by Mohammad Javad Zarif as Chief Nuclear Negotiator	Head of Iran's JCPOA Follow-up Commission; 2015–2021	Succeeded by Ali Bagheri Kani
Academic offices
Preceded by ?	Director-general of the IPIS; 1999	Succeeded by Mohammad-Kazem Sajjadpour
Preceded by Massoud Eslami	Dean of the School of International Relations; 2004–2005	Succeeded by Ala'-addin Vahid Gharavi
Political offices
Preceded by Gholam-Ali Khoshroo	Vice Minister of Foreign Affairs for Legal and International Affairs; 2005–2008; 2013–2018	Succeeded by Pirooz Hosseini; Acting
Preceded by Mohammad-Mehdi Akhoundzadeh	Vice Minister of Foreign Affairs for Legal and International Affairs; 2005–2008; 2013–2018	Succeeded by Gholam-Hossein Dehghani
Preceded by Mohammad-Ali Fathollahi	Vice Minister of Foreign Affairs for Asia–Pacific and the Commonwealth Affairs; 2011–2013	Succeeded by Ebrahim Rahimpour
Preceded by Ramin Mehmanparast	Spokesperson for the Ministry of Foreign Affairs of Iran; Acting; 2013	Succeeded by Marzieh Afkham
New title Office re-established since 1988	Vice Minister of Foreign Affairs for Political Affairs; 2018–2021	Succeeded by Ali Bagheri Kani
Preceded by Ali Bagheri Kani; Acting	Minister of Foreign Affairs; 2024–present	Incumbent
Government offices
Preceded by Mohammad-Bagher Khorramshad	Secretary of the Strategic Council on Foreign Relations; 2021–2024	Succeeded by Ali Bagheri Kani
