= List of Iranian nuclear negotiators =

Nuclear negotiators of Iran since 2003

There is a list of chief nuclear negotiators of Iran since 2003.

== List of chief negotiators ==
Chief Negotiator	Picture	Tenure	Office	President
Hassan Rouhani		2003–2005	Secretary of the SNSC	Mohammad Khatami
Ali Larijani		2005–2007	Secretary of the SNSC	Mahmoud Ahmadinejad
Saeed Jalili		2007–2013	Secretary of the SNSC	Mahmoud Ahmadinejad
Mohammad Javad Zarif		2013–2015	Minister of Foreign Affairs	Hassan Rouhani
Abbas Araghchi		2015–2021	Head of Iran's Joint Comprehensive Plan of Action Follow-up Commission	Hassan Rouhani
Ali Bagheri		2021–2024	Head of Iran's Joint Comprehensive Plan of Action Follow-up Commission	Ebrahim Raisi
Abbas Araghchi		2024–Present	Minister of Foreign Affairs	Masoud Pezeshkian

== See also ==
- Negotiations leading to the Joint Comprehensive Plan of Action
- Negotiations on Iran nuclear deal framework
- Assassination and terrorism in Iran
- Assassinations of Iranian nuclear scientists
- Israel and the nuclear program of Iran
- Supreme Nuclear Committee of Iran
