= Ariane Tabatabai =

Iranian-American political scientist

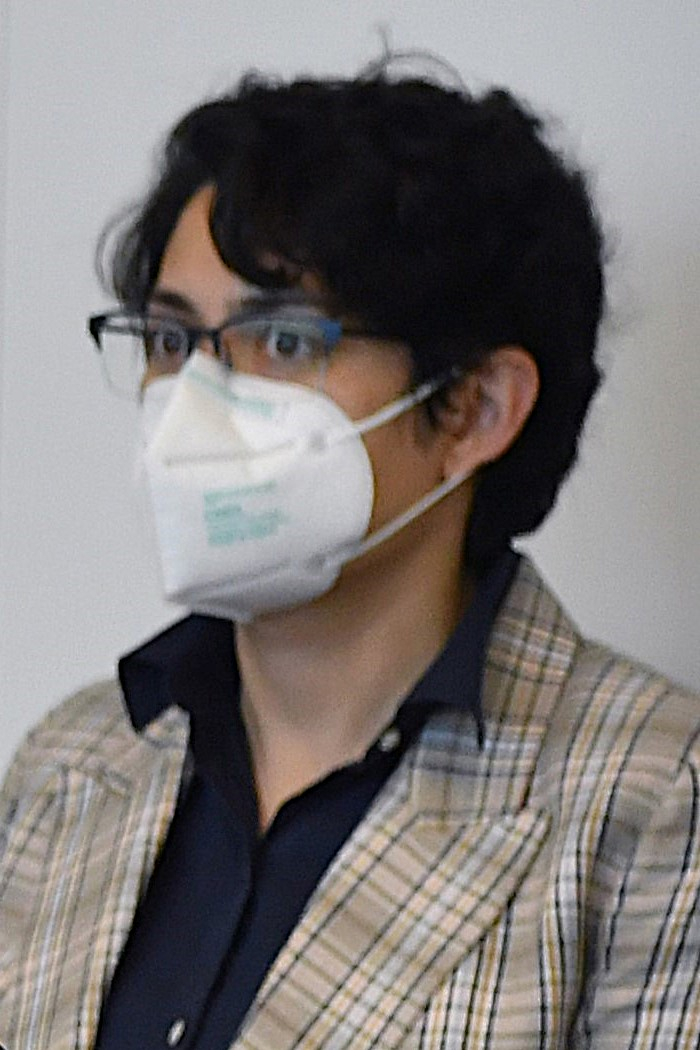
- Occupation: Political scientist

Academic background
- Education: Stony Brook University
- Alma mater: King's College London (PhD)
- Thesis: God, Country, and the Bomb: The stretegic implications of Islamic ethical and legal-nuclear discourses (2015)
- Doctoral advisors: James Gow; Wyn Bowen

Ariane Tabatabai (Persian: آرین طباطبایی) is an Iranian-American political science expert and author. She is a senior policy advisor to the United States Department of Defense.

== Early life and education ==
Tabatabai is the daughter of Javad Tabatabai, an Iranian professor of political science and law at the University of Tehran. She attended King's College London, where she earned her PhD in defence studies in 2015.

== Career ==
Starting in 2015, Tabatabai worked as a researcher for the southern California-based RAND Corporation think tank. She was then a curriculum director and visiting associate professor of security studies at Georgetown University, an international civilian consultant for NATO, and a former Middle East Fellow at the Alliance for Securing Democracy at the German Marshall Fund of the United States.

Tabatabai wrote an article published by Foreign Policy magazine prior to the 2020 US presidential election, arguing that Iran's economy was fragile and its leaders would be forced to negotiate and make concessions; she urged the winning US presidential candidate not to return to the nuclear agreement and press for more points.

After the Biden administration took office in January 2021, Robert Malley was appointed to lead U.S. nuclear negotiations with Iran, with Tabatabai appointed as a team member. She departed the negotiating team (along with Richard Nephew) after a few months because she believed that the U.S. would lift too many sanctions on Iran and consequently, a reinstated agreement would not be strong enough.

Tabatabai is a member of the Council on Foreign Relations.

== Controversies ==
In September 2023, a large cache of Iranian government correspondence and emails reported for the first time by Semafor and Iran International claimed to connect Tabatabai with the Iran Experts Initiative, an effort initiated by senior Iranian Foreign Ministry officials to bolster Tehran's image and positions on global security issues. In response, Senator Marsha Blackburn called for a review of her security clearance. In October 2023, after a review, Tabatabai retained her top-secret security clearance. Two weeks later, the Pentagon released a statement confirming that "Dr. Tabatabai was thoroughly and properly vetted" as a condition of her employment with the Department of Defense.

== Books ==
- Tabatabai, A. (2020). No Conquest, No Defeat: Iran's National Security Strategy. London: Hurst & Company.
- Tabatabai, A. and Dina Esfandiary (2021). Triple-Axis: Iran's Relations with Russia and China. New York: Bloomsbury Publishing.
