= Ali Bagheri Kani =

Iranian diplomat (born 1967)

Seyyed Ali Bagheri Kani
- علی باقری کنی
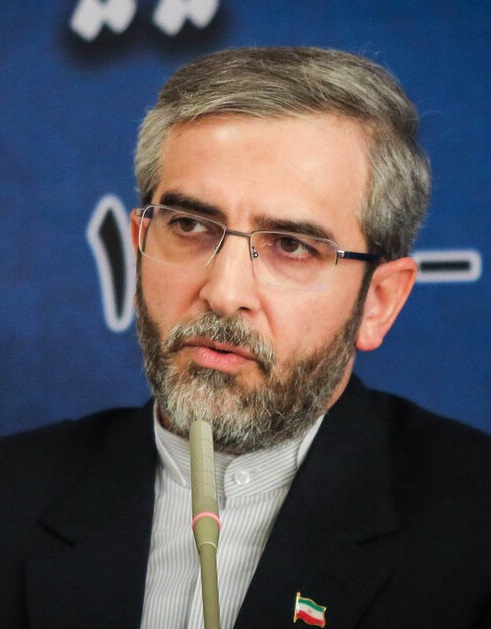
- Bagheri in 2019

Minister of Foreign Affairs Acting
- In office 20 May 2024 – 21 August 2024
- President: Mohammad Mokhber (acting)
- Preceded by: Hossein Amir-Abdollahian
- Succeeded by: Abbas Araghchi

Personal details
- Born: 1967 (age 58–59) Kan, Tehran, Iran
- Parent: Mohammad-Bagher Bagheri Kani (father)
- Relatives: Mohammad-Reza Mahdavi Kani (uncle)
- Education: Economy
- Alma mater: Imam Sadiq University

Ali Bagheri Kani (Persian: علی باقری کنی; born 1967) is an Iranian diplomat who is currently the deputy secretary for the Supreme National Security Council. He was formerly political deputy at the Ministry of Foreign Affairs of Iran from September 2021 to September 2024, along with being the acting Minister of Foreign Affairs in 2024. He is considered to be close to the Iranian principlists and to be part of the inner circle of the late Iranian supreme leader Ayatollah Ali Khamenei.

== Early life and education ==
Bagheri Kani was born in 1967 in the village of Kan in Tehran County. His father, Mohammad-Bagher Bagheri Kani, is a Shiite cleric who served as a member of the Assembly of Experts, while his uncle, Mohammad Reza Mahdavi Kani, later led the same body. His brother, Mesbah al-Hoda Bagheri Kani, is a son-in-law of Supreme Leader Ayatollah Ali Khamenei.

Bagheri Kani studied economics at the Imam Sadiq University in Tehran.

== Career ==
Bagheri Kani has been a diplomat since 1990. He was Deputy Secretary of Iran's Supreme National Security Council from 2007 to 2013 and currently serves as advisor at the council. He was also chairman of Saeed Jalili's presidential campaign in the 2013 election. He also briefly worked as a political analyst at IRIB.

On 14 February 2011, Bagheri Kani was arrested after being summoned by the Intelligence Ministry. He served as a political director for the Interior Ministry during the presidency of Mohammad Khatami.

Bagheri Kani was the lead negotiator in mediations between Iran and the United States in the September 2023 prisoner release deal. He had served as deputy to the foreign minister.

Bagheri Kani served as the Acting Minister of Foreign Affairs on 20 May 2024, following the death of his predecessor Hossein Amir-Abdollahian, in a helicopter crash. On 3 June 2024, he made his first overseas visit as foreign minister to Lebanon, during which he confirmed that the Iranian government was engaged in negotiations with the United States hosted by Oman. He served as minister until his replacement by Abbas Araghchi on 21 August 2024.

Political offices
| Preceded by Keivan Imani | Ministry of Foreign Affairs'; Director General of Central and Northern Europe; 2006–2008 | Succeeded by ? |
| New title Office established | Vice Minister of Foreign Affairs for European Affairs; Acting; 2007 | Succeeded by Mehdi Safari |
| Preceded by Abbas Araghchi | Vice Minister of Foreign Affairs for Political Affairs; 2021–2024 | Succeeded by Majid Takht-Ravanchi |
| Preceded by Hossein Amir-Abdollahian | Minister of Foreign Affairs; Acting; 2024 | Succeeded by Abbas Araghchi |
Government offices
| Preceded by Javad Va'idi as Vice Secretariat for International Affairs | Vice Secretariat of Supreme National Security Council for Foreign policy and International security 2008–2013 | Succeeded by Amir-Saeid Iravani |
| Preceded by Mehdi Bokharaei-Zadeh as Director of Foreign policy Affairs | Vice Secretariat of Supreme National Security Council for Foreign policy and International security 2008–2013 | Succeeded by Amir-Saeid Iravani |
| Preceded by Abbas Araghchi | Secretary of Strategic Council on Foreign Relations; 2024–2025 | Succeeded by Jalal Dehghani Firouzabadi |
Diplomatic posts
| Preceded by Javad Va'idi | Senior Negotiator of Iran for Nuclear Issue; 2008–2013 | Succeeded by Abbas Araghchi as Vice Minister of Foreign Affairs for Legal and International Affairs |
| Preceded by Abbas Araghchi | Head of Iran's JCPOA Follow-up Commission; 2021–2024 | Vacant |
Party political offices
| New title | Campaign manager of Saeed Jalili; 2013 | Succeeded by Mohammad-Mehdi Tajrishi |
Legal offices
| Preceded by Mohammad-Javad Larijani | Vice Chief Justice for International Affairs; Secretary of High Council for Human Rights; 2019–2021 | Succeeded by Kazem Gharibabadi |
