= Leaked Mohammad Javad Zarif audiotape =

Controversial recording involving Iran's foreign minister

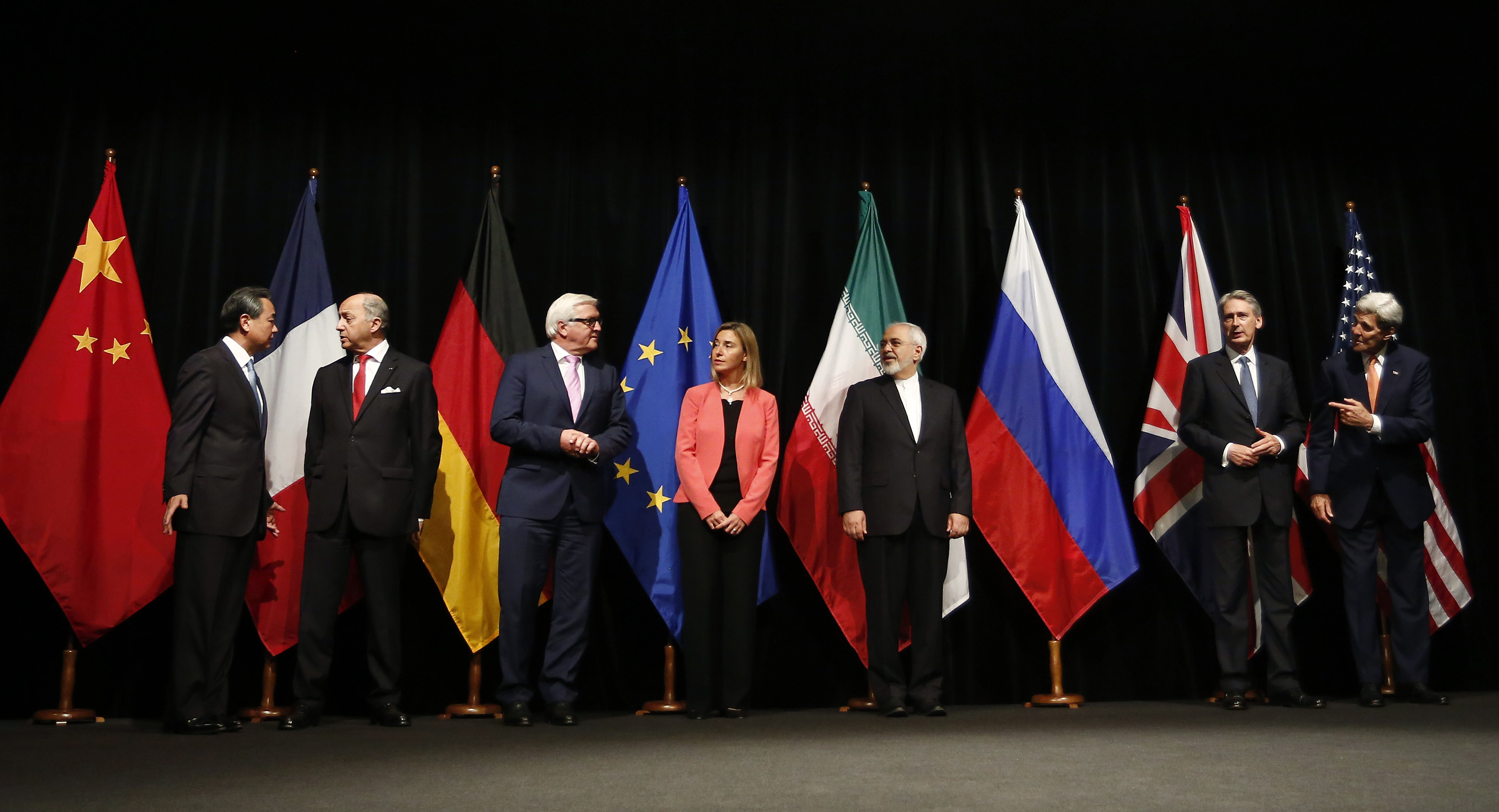
According to Zarif, in the last week of JCPOA's signing, Russia did its best to prevent the agreement from succeeding. In this regard, he refers to the famous photo of the foreign ministers of the countries after the agreement was reached in which the Russian foreign minister is absent.

In April 2021, more than three hours of audiotape was leaked from a seven-hour interview between economist Saeed Leylaz and Iranian foreign minister Mohammad Javad Zarif. The taped conversation was connected to an oral history project, titled "In the Islamic Republic, the military field rules," that documents the work of then-president Hassan Rouhani and his government. The tape was obtained by the Saudi-funded news channel Iran International and publicized by The New York Times. Zarif did not dispute the authenticity of the leaked tape, but questioned the motive.

Although the tape has not been authenticated, the Iranian foreign ministry spokesman did not deny its validity, and critics of Zarif were calling for his resignation, saying that "he had threatened Iran’s national security by revealing to the world the country’s inner politics". Iran's president Hassan Rouhani ordered an investigation to identify who leaked the tape. He stated that it was "stolen for clear reasons". On May 2, 2021, in an Instagram post, Zarif apologized for the remarks that he made against Qasem Soleimani.

== John Kerry and Iranian diplomacy ==
In the tape, Zarif said former U.S. Secretary of State John Kerry told him that Israel attacked Iranian assets in Syria "at least 200 times." Zarif said that he was astonished by the admission. Kerry was not recorded speaking on the tape, and the date of the recording is unknown. A posting on Iran International's website indicated that Zarif was taken aback, that it was not the IRGC who informed him about the Israeli strikes against Iran, but Kerry.

NBC reported that the leaked tape "inflamed a debate raging in Iran over the nuclear deal" with upcoming presidential elections. Also, its effects in the US where "Republican opponents of nuclear diplomacy with Iran have seized on Zarif's account".

=== History ===
On September 27, 2013, Kerry met with Zarif during the P5+1 and Iran summit, which eventually led to the JCPOA nuclear agreement. It was the highest-level direct contact between the United States and Iran in the last six years, and it made Kerry the first U.S. Secretary of State to have met with his Iranian counterpart since the 1979 Iranian Revolution.

In April 2021, the spokesperson for the United States Department of State Ned Price stated in a press briefing that he couldn't confirm the accuracy or authenticity of the Zarif audiotape or its claims, but implied that Kerry would not have likely been disclosing confidential information if it occurred. He stated that prior press reporting of Israeli attacks on Syria would have made the suspected call contents already part of the public record, making Kerry's alleged disclosures to Zarif as not confidential. As CNN noted, Israeli Prime Minister Benjamin Netanyahu revealed in July 2017 that Israeli airstrikes had targeted Iranian-backed Hezbollah-bound convoys in Syria "dozens of times", and in August 2017, Israeli Air Force chief Maj. Gen. Amir Eshel confirmed that Israel had attacked convoys bringing arms to Hezbollah several times over the past five years. In 2018, Israeli Intelligence Minister Israel Katz stated that "in the last two years Israel has taken military action [against Iran] more than 200 times within Syria itself." However, it is unclear whether Kerry allegedly revealed the Israeli operations to Zarif before or after Israel itself publicly reported them in 2018.

In May 2019, the Los Angeles Times reported that then-President Donald Trump said that Kerry “should be prosecuted” for meeting privately with Iranian officials.

=== Investigation requests ===
Nineteen Republican senators signed a letter asking President Joe Biden to investigate the Zarif claim, writing: "We write to convey our grave concerns over U.S. Special Presidential Envoy for Climate John Kerry’s position as a member of your administration's National Security Council and his record – both past and present – of potentially working with America’s adversaries against our national security interests and those of our allies. We ask you to investigate recent allegations that Secretary Kerry revealed sensitive information to the Iranian Foreign Minister Mohammad Javad Zarif, and if true, call for his removal from your national security team."

Three Republican representatives, Ann Wagner, Andy Barr, and Lee Zeldin, sent a letter to Diana Shaw, the State Department's acting inspector general, asking for a full investigation into Zarif's claims. In the letter they wrote, “Given the gravity of the security threat Iran poses to U.S. and Israeli interests, we respectfully ask that you fully investigate these allegations...Iran is a serious threat to Israel, a bulwark of democracy and stability in the Middle East. It is in our national security interest to stand by our strategic ally - not sell it out to our adversaries”. The letter also requested that Shaw make a determination if Kerry should have his security clearance revoked.

The lawmakers inquired what role Kerry had in formulating the Biden administration's policy on re-entering the JCPOA. They also questioned whether the state department knew of any Iranian proxy “follow-on attacks” made against Israel after Kerry allegedly met with Zarif.

In May 2021, Republicans on the House Oversight and Reform Committee requested documents from the White House regarding Kerry's security clearance. In the letter, signed by all but three Republicans on the panel, they questioned "Kerry’s fitness to serve in his current role with the National Security Council" and whether he should maintain a security clearance.

=== Reactions ===
==== John Kerry ====
In a tweet, Kerry denied Zarif's account, writing: “I can tell you that this story and these allegations are unequivocally false. This never happened — either when I was Secretary of State or since.”

==== Biden administration ====
- United States Secretary of State Antony Blinken dismissed the audiotape as "utter nonsense."
- Spokesperson for the United States Department of State Ned Price stated that he couldn't confirm the accuracy or authenticity of the audiotape or its claims, but implied that Kerry would not have likely been disclosing confidential information because Israel had publicly revealed that it had struck Iranian forces in Syria in 2017 and 2018.

==== Republicans ====
Starting on April 27, 2021, some Republicans suggested that Kerry should resign from the Biden administration's National Security Council or were highly critical of Kerry's alleged disclosures.

- Sen. Dan Sullivan said “People are talking about treason — and I don’t throw that word around a lot...John Kerry does all kinds of things that I can’t stand. But this is the one that broke the camel’s back.”
- Rep. Lee Zeldin called the alleged comments by Kerry “massively alarming" and If it's proven that Kerry actively undermined one of America's staunchest allies, he needs to resign from the Biden administration immediately and have his security clearance revoked".
- Sen. Roger Marshall said, "John Kerry should be forced out of the Administration immediately — at the very least be removed entirely from all national security briefings and decisions".
- Sen. Ted Cruz that if "this tape is verified, it would signal catastrophic and disqualifying recklessness by Envoy Kerry to Foreign Minister Zarif that endangered the safety of Americans and our allies".
- Former United Nations Ambassador Nikki Haley tweeted that Kerry's disclosure was "stabbing" Israel in the back.
- Rep. Mike Gallagher said, "It’s unfathomable that any U.S. diplomat, past or present, would leak intelligence to the world’s leading sponsors of terrorism at the expense of one of our staunchest allies".
- Former secretary of state of the first Trump administration Mike Pompeo said, "When I was briefing Trump, Kerry was briefing Zarif".
- Four-star general Jack Keane said that these are still allegations, but he was not surprised, stating that Zarif and Kerry have a "close relationship" that continued after Kerry left office. He said, that it was "completely irresponsible and downright reckless, and to a certain degree quite unprecedented in terms of our history."

Other Republicans expressed uncertainty about the tape's veracity.

- Sen. Lindsey Graham said, "I don’t know if we should trust that tape or not. If it’s true, it’s very damaging...I like John Kerry, but that would not be helpful and it would be very problematic if it were true. But let’s wait and see how authentic this is.”
- Rep. Michael McCaul said, "To me, we need to open an investigation. The facts need to come out. I don't know if they're true or not, but if they are, there should be consequences. This appears to be somewhat treasonous to be meeting with the enemy and cutting back deals and sharing information, intelligence related to Israel and its efforts against Iran proxies in Syria. Having said that, we don't know all the facts. And rest assured, I will find out."
- Sen. Mitt Romney said, “It’s very troubling, and there needs to be full transparency to understand exactly what was done, by whom, for what purpose, and an accounting of what occurred...We have one recording by an Iranian official, but this is something that has to be evaluated and looked into.”

==== Media ====
- Fox News published a story that although there had been intense backlash after the New York Times published the story about Kerry, there had also been a "widespread blackout in media coverage", with ABC, CBS, NBC, and MSNBC making no mentions of the "controversy".
- The National Review wrote: "Was this a deliberate Obama administration decision to tell the Iranians, or was Kerry freelancing? Either way, it seems extraordinarily unlikely that the Israelis had signed off on Kerry revealing this information to Tehran."
- The Washington Post columnist, Marc A. Thiessen, wrote: "Four years ago, Senate Democrats demanded an investigation of Trump’s alleged disclosures to Russia. But now that it is Kerry who stands accused, the silence from Democrats is deafening. The Iranian foreign minister has said he learned this intelligence information from Kerry. That cannot simply be ignored. Democrats have a responsibility to conduct oversight over the Biden national security team. Kerry should be called to Capitol Hill to explain under oath what he said to Zarif — and when he said it."

== Zarif's comments on Qasem Soleimani ==
In the tape, Zarif spoke about his relationship with Qasem Soleimani, who was killed by a United States drone strike in 2020. Zarif said that "by assassinating [Soleimani] in Iraq, the United States delivered a major blow to Iran, more damaging than if it had wiped out an entire city in an attack".

=== Reactions ===
- On May 2, 2021, in an Instagram post, Zarif apologized for the remarks that he made against Soleimani, writing: "Some have tried to use this unfortunate situation as a means to disrupt the empathy of the brave people of this region or as a tool for short-term political goals...I should emphasize that my words do not undermine a single bit of the greatness of Martyr General Soleimani and his irreplaceable role in restoring the security of Iran, the region and the world...If I had known a sentence from those words would have been made public, I certainly would not have uttered it as I did in the past."
- On May 2, 2021, during a televised speech, Iran's Supreme Leader, Ayatollah Ali Khamenei, said Zarif's comments was a "big mistake that must not be perpetrated by officials of the Islamic Republic".
- Former US Secretary of State Mike Pompeo tweeted, "Our Administration’s exquisite strike on Qasem Soleimani had a massive impact on Iran and the Middle East. You don’t have to take my word for it. Ask @JZarif. President Biden still thinks it was a mistake."
- In a letter to Zarif, several Iranian "martyrs" families criticized him for insulting Soleimani. They wrote that Zarif blamed other Iranians for his "failure" in negotiations.

== See also ==
- Iran Experts Initiative
