= Saeed Jalili =

Iranian politician

- سعید جلیلی
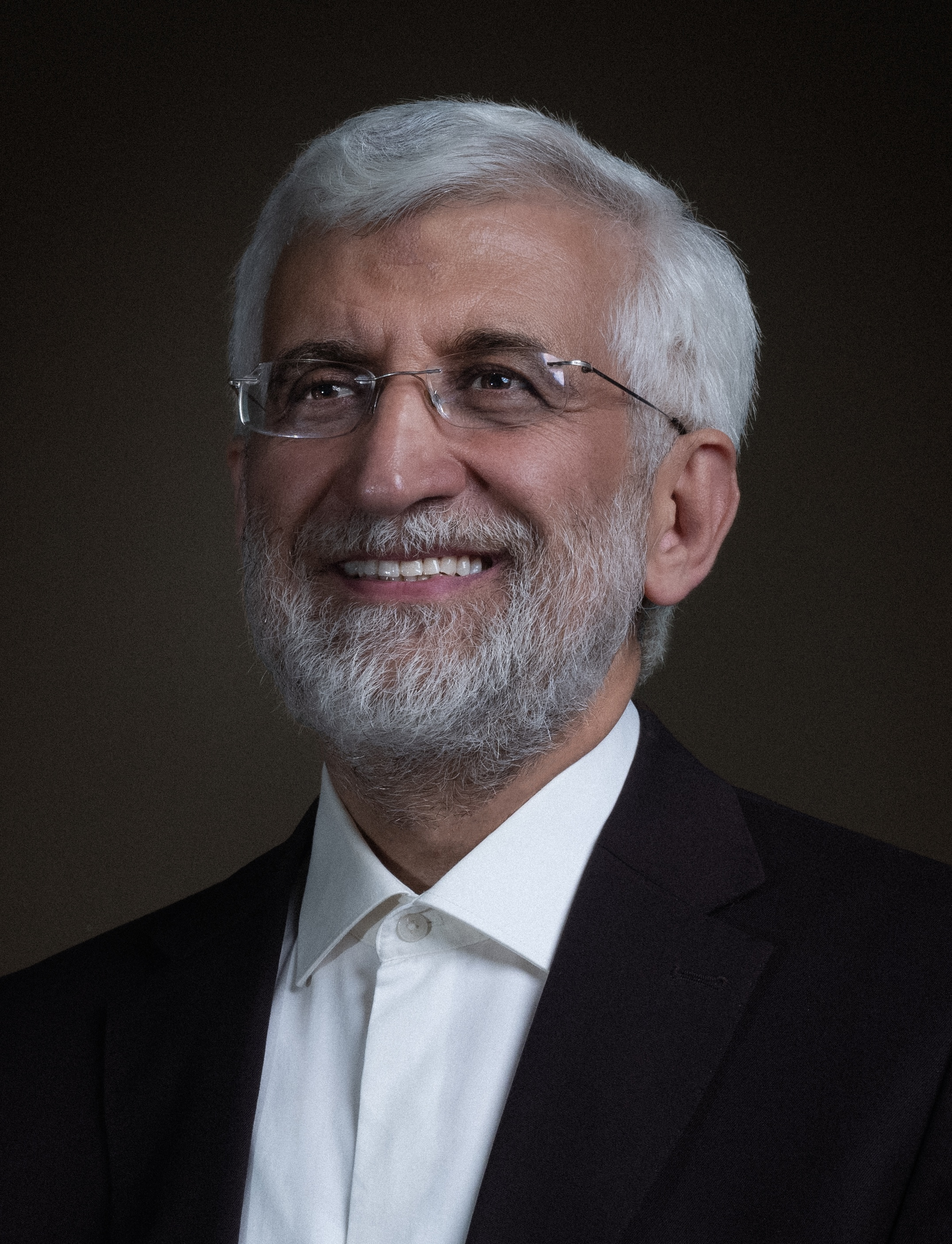
- Jalili in 2025

Member of Expediency Discernment Council of the System
- Incumbent
- Assumed office 12 September 2013
- Appointed by: Ali Khamenei
- President: Mahmoud Ahmadinejad
- Chairman: Akbar Hashemi Rafsanjani; Ali Movahedi-Kermani (Acting); Mahmoud Hashemi Shahroudi; Sadeq Larijani

3rd Secretary of the Supreme National Security Council
- In office 20 October 2007 – 12 September 2013
- Preceded by: Ali Larijani
- Succeeded by: Ali Shamkhani

Chief Nuclear Negotiator of Iran
- In office 21 October 2007 – 5 September 2013
- President: Mahmoud Ahmadinejad
- Deputy: Ali Bagheri
- Preceded by: Ali Larijani
- Succeeded by: Mohammad Javad Zarif

Director of General Inspection Office
- In office 5 March 1995 – 8 October 1996
- Appointed by: Ali Khamenei
- President: Akbar Rafsanjani

Personal details
- Born: 6 September 1965 (age 61) Mashhad, Iran
- Party: Nonpartisan
- Spouse: Fatemeh Sajjadi (m. 1993)
- Children: 1
- Education: Imam Sadegh University
- Website: drjalily.com

Military service
- Allegiance: Iran
- Branch/service: Basij
- Unit: 5th Nasr Division
- Battles/wars: 1979 Kurdish Rebellion; Iran–Iraq War; Operation Fath-ol-Mobin; Operation Tariq-ol-Qods; Operation Nasr; Operation Ramadan; Operation Beit-ol-Moqaddas; Second Battle of Khorramshahr; Battle of Mehran; Operation Dawn 3; Operation Dawn 4; Operation Dawn 5; Operation Badr; Operation Karbala 4; Siege of Basra (WIA)

Saeed Jalili (Persian: سعید جلیلی; born 6 September 1965) is an Iranian principlist politician and diplomat, who has been a member of the Expediency Discernment Council of the System since 2013. He was both chief nuclear negotiator for Iran and secretary of the Supreme National Security Council from 2007 to 2013. His tenure as chief negotiator on Iran's nuclear program was characterized by his uncompromising approach.

He was deputy foreign minister for European and American Affairs from 2005 to 2007. Jalili was later an unsuccessful candidate for president of Iran three times; in the 2013 Iranian presidential election (placing third), in 2021 (he ultimately withdrew), and in 2024 (he was defeated by Masoud Pezeshkian in a runoff election).

Jalili was a soldier with the Basij volunteers of the Islamic Revolutionary Guard Corps in the Iran–Iraq War, and lost part of his right leg during the Siege of Basra. This earned him the nickname of "Living Martyr" among his supporters. He holds a PhD in political science, and taught the "Prophet's diplomacy" at Imam Sadiq University. In 2009, Jalili was named as one of the 500 most influential people in the Muslim world.

Jalili is known for his staunch ultra-hardline positions and confrontational rhetoric against the West. At the same time he has pushed for stronger relations with Russia and China. He strongly advocates women being required to wear the mandatory hijab, and the government enforcing the requirement. Backed by the fundamentalist Iranian Principlist Paydari Front, he attributes Iran's economic troubles to international sanctions, and rejects social liberalization. This has earned him significant influence, as well as discomfort among the more pragmatic factions within the Iranian establishment.

== Personal life and education ==
Jalili was born in 1965 in Mashhad in northeastern Iran, to a Kurdish father originally from Kurdistan province whose family was relocated to Khorasan during the reign of Reza Shah, and an Azeri mother originally from Ardabil province. His father, Mohammad Hasan Muallem, was the principal of Nawab Safavi Primary School in Mashhad. Jalili's brother Vahid is a fundamentalist who is the deputy for cultural affairs at Iran’s state broadcaster, IRIB. Jalili married Fatemeh Sajjadi, a doctor of internal medicine, in 1992. They have one child, a son named Sajjad. Jalili was a resident of Karaj until 2004.

Jalili holds a PhD in political science from Imam Sadeq University, and his doctoral thesis entitled "The Paradigm (Foundation) of Political Thought of Islam in the Qur'an" was later developed into a book by the name of "The Foreign Policy of the Prophet (Prophet Muhammad)." He has taught political science as a lecturer since 2000 at different intervals at Imam Sadeq University. Jalili is familiar with English and Arabic.

== Military career ==
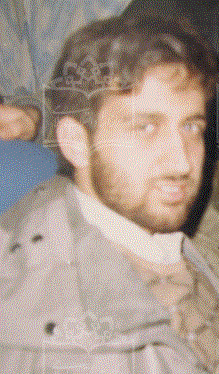
Jalili during the Iran–Iraq War

Jalili served as a member of the Basij paramilitary volunteers of the Islamic Revolutionary Guard Corps in the Iran–Iraq War. During the fighting, he was injured severely while acting as a forward observer, and the lower portion of his right leg was amputated in 1986. Thereafter, he served in administrative positions.

== Political career ==
Following the war, Jalili began working as a university lecturer at his alma mater. In 1989 he started working at the ministry of foreign affairs in addition to his teaching post. From 1995 to 1996 he served as director of the inspection office at the ministry. In 2001, he was appointed senior director of policy planning in the office of the Supreme Leader, Ayatollah Ali Khamenei. Jalili was also made a member of the Supreme National Security Council in 2002.

After the election of Mahmoud Ahmadinejad to the presidency in August 2005, Jalili was appointed deputy foreign minister for European and American affairs. He was in office until October 2007. During the same period, he also served as an advisor to Ahmedinejad.

On 20 October 2007, Jalili replaced Ali Larijani as secretary of the council and became responsible for international negotiations over Iran's nuclear program. However, he was described as uncompromising even among Iranian representatives, and was considered "impossible" by European officials. A nuclear deal was struck only after Jalili was dismissed as secretary of the council on 10 September 2013, and Ali Shamkhani was appointed to replace him. Immediately after being dismissed from the office, Jalili was appointed by Supreme Leader Ali Khamenei to the Expediency Discernment Council of the System as a member.

=== Activities and views ===
Jalili is a leading figure of the hardline "Iranian neo-Principalist" group in the Iranian political scene, and a protégé of Mojtaba Khamenei. The New York Times reported that an Iranian analyst described him in 2013 as "the perfect follower of [Ali] Khamenei" who "doesn’t care about foreign relations, the economy or anything," and that his speeches reflect the worldview "of an Iran engaged in a multifaceted battle with the West", maintained by Iran's Supreme Leader.

Jalili describes himself as a strong believer in the doctrine of "velayat-e faqih", the central principle of Iran’s political system, which holds that a senior righteous Islamic Shi'i jurist should as the Supreme Leader have the highest authority in both political and religious matters. Jalili was known for his loyalty to Ali Khamenei.

He strongly advocates women being required to wear the mandatory hijab, and believes that the Iranian government should not hesitate to enforce the hijab law. Jalili says that Iranian women should focus their lives on home and family, instead of pursuing careers, and that the state must regulate Iran's cultural and social life so as to ensure that it remains “pure.”

While Secretary of the Supreme National Security Council, Jalili coordinated Iran's regional policies, and engaged with the Islamic Republic's proxies. He met with and expressed support for the leadership of Hezbollah in Lebanon, Syrian President Bashar al-Assad, and senior Hamas officials whom he hosted in Tehran as part of Iran's broad regional outreach.

In 2014 Jalili participated in an international gathering of Holocaust deniers in Tehran, hosted by the regime.

During his tenure as chief negotiator for Iran on its nuclear program, he elicited the following views:

He was a true believer in the Iranian Revolution. He was constantly taking notes during the session, and at the same time had a wry smile on his face. Jalili and his colleagues looked at me many times and seemed to find the presence of America worrying.

Then he started giving a 40-minute long meandering speech and weaving unnecessary philosophy about the Iranian culture and history, as well as the constructive role it can play in the region. Jalili shockingly blurts out words when he wants to avoid a direct answer, and this was exactly one of those moments. He even mentioned that he still teaches part-time at Tehran University. But, I was not at all jealous of his students.

— William J. Burns, U.S. diplomat

We learned a lot about Iran's history and Iran's herds during the many hours we listened to Mr. Jalili's speeches. Unfortunately, little progress was made in the negotiations during that period. Since the summer of 2013, the negotiations have continued in a much more serious and professional manner, and very little time has been spent on speech objections, and most of the time has been spent on professional and informal business meetings. Jalili talked about the History of Islam and Iran; we learned a lot of history.

— Robert J. Einhorn, former U.S. Department of State Senior Advisor to the Under Secretary for Arms Control and International Security, in an interview about Jailili

Mohammad Marandi, a professor at Tehran University closely linked to the Iranian government, described him as a tough negotiator who "believes strongly in Iran's nuclear program and its sovereign rights. He's not the sort of person to give major concessions."

During presidential campaign debates in 2024, Jalili declared that he would "make the enemy regret" the sanctions on Iran, and stated that he had a plan of action to do so once he became president.

=== Ministry of Foreign Affairs ===
Jalili worked for the Ministry of Foreign Affairs from the age of 26, when he was named head of the Inspection Department, rigorously screening applicants for ideological nonconformity and perceived lack of religious devotion. He remained in the position until 1996.

In 1997, he became the director of investigations of the leadership office under Mohammad Khatami. Under Mahmoud Ahmadinejad, in 2005 he was deputy foreign minister for European and American Affairs.

=== Secretary of the Supreme National Security Council, and chief nuclear negotiator (2007-2013) ===
In 2007, Supreme Leader Ali Khamenei chose Jalili as his representative and the secretary of the Supreme National Security Council.

The peak of Jalili's activity in the Supreme National Security Council was his heading of the negotiations concerning Iran's development of nuclear technology. His hardline negotiations did not yield any positive results, and multilateral sanctions were imposed on Iran by the United Nations Security Council during his tenure. Ali Akbar Velayati said, "Diplomacy does not equal delivering a sermon to the counterpart … Diplomacy is not a philosophy class … Being principled does not equal inflexibility … Diplomacy does not mean hawkishness but is an active and transactional engagement … The art of diplomacy is to safeguard our nuclear rights and reduce sanctions, not increase those sanctions!"

When Hassan Rouhani took office as president of Iran in August 2013, he dismissed Jalili and replaced him with Ali Shamkhani as the secretary of the Supreme National Security Council.

=== Member of the Expediency Discernment Council of the System ===
As the secretary of the Supreme National Security Council, Jalili was a legal member of the Expediency Discernment Council of the System. After Jalili was dismissed by Rouhani, Ali Khamenei appointed him again as a member of the council in September 2013.

=== Member of the Foreign Relations Strategic Council ===
Khamenei appointed Jalili as a member of the Strategic Council of Foreign Relations in 2014. He is currently the head of this council.

=== 2013 presidential candidacy ===
Jalili was a candidate in the 2013 presidential elections, announcing his candidacy on 22 March 2013. He was supported by the Front of Islamic Revolution Stability and also by Kamran Bagheri Lankarani, the party's main candidate who declined his candidacy in favour of Jalili.

His campaign slogans were "No compromise. No submission. Only Jalili." and "A Pleasant Life". He opposed “détente a hundred percent”, and promised that he would not agree to any compromise “whatsoever” with the West over Iran’s nuclear program and Iran's involvement in Syria. He received 4,168,946 votes (11%) and came in third, behind president-elect Hassan Rouhani and runner-up Mohammad Bagher Ghalibaf.

=== Shadow Cabinet ===
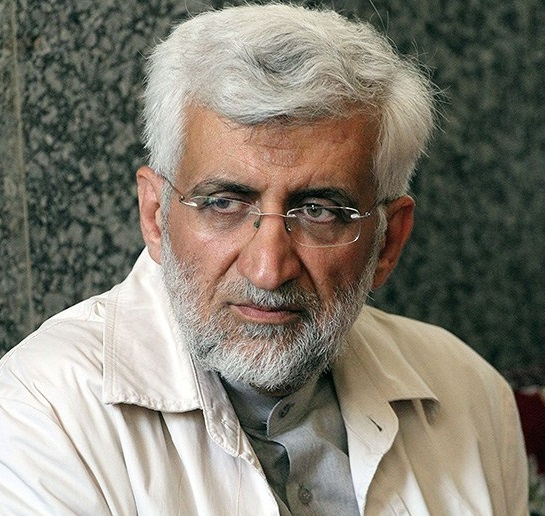
Jalili in 2019

In 2013, after he was defeated in the presidential election, Jalili proposed a plan of a Shadow Cabinet that would include other hardliners with connections to Khamenei and the IRGC, ostensibly to help the Hassan Rouhani government and compensate for its shortcomings. He held several meetings to criticise the government and offer a solution, and opposed any new nuclear negotiations by Iran with the West.

In early 2021, he met 19 members of parliament and discussed his suggestions to reform the budget structure. They also took a petrochemical refinery development plan to the Larijani parliament (right-wing political opposition) and approved it, and the plan was communicated to the Rouhani government (left-wing political opposition) for implementation. Jalili said that the Shadow Cabinet was neither a party nor an organisation, but a discourse and it meant that everyone must follow the process of developments, shadow by shadow to have a positive impact on the path of the Islamic Revolution, and that media must be marshalled to win the war that Iran is in.

=== 2021 presidential candidacy ===
Before the last day of registration for the presidential election, he was considered one of the most likely candidates. Although Jalili had said he would not register if Ebrahim Raisi entered the election, with the flood of members and supporters of the established government such as Jahangiri, Larijani, Shariatmadari, Akhundi and Hemmati, it is conflict that he registered in the election individually or to support Raisi.

=== 2024 presidential candidacy ===
Jalili ran for president in the 2024 presidential election. On 29 June, he secured 40% of the votes during the first round of the election, taking second place behind reformist candidate Masoud Pezeshkian, and thus qualifying for a runoff, which he then lost. Jalili received support from unsuccessful candidate Mohammad Bagher Ghalibaf, who placed third, as well as from politicians Alireza Zakani and Amir-Hossein Ghazizadeh, who had both previously dropped out.

== Electoral history ==
Year	Election	Votes	%	Rank	Notes
2004	Parliament				Lost
2008	Parliament				Lost
2013	President	4,168,946	11.31	3rd	Lost
2021	President	–			Withdrew
2024	President	9,473,298▲	38.61▲	2nd▲	Went to run-off
2024	President run off	13,538,179▲	45.24% ▲	2nd	Lost

== Books ==
- Foreign Policy of the Prophet of Islam (Persian: سیاست خارجی پیامبر اسلام)
- The Paradigm of Islamic Political Thought in Quran (Persian: بنیان اندیشۀ سیاسی اسلام در قرآن)

Political offices
Preceded by Ali Larijani	Secretary of the Supreme National Security Council; 2007–2013	Succeeded by Ali Shamkhani
Diplomatic posts
Preceded by Ali Larijani	Chief Nuclear Negotiator of Iran; 2007–2013	Succeeded by Mohammad Javad Zarif
