= Mohammad Taghi Barkhordar =

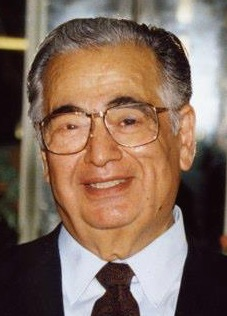
- Born: 1924; Yazd, Iran
- Died: 18 July 2011 (aged 86–87); Tehran, Iran
- Occupation: Iranian businessman

Mohammad Taghi Barkhordar known as Haji Barkhordar (1924 – 18 July 2011) was an Iranian industrialist and entrepreneur. He founded Pars Electric Manufacturing Company PJSC, the first company producing colour TVs in Iran. He had a key role in development of Iranian home appliances industry. After the Islamic revolution in 1979 and nationalisation of industries, he left the country and did not return before 1991.
