= Javad Tabatabai =

Iranian philosopher and political scientist (1945–2023)

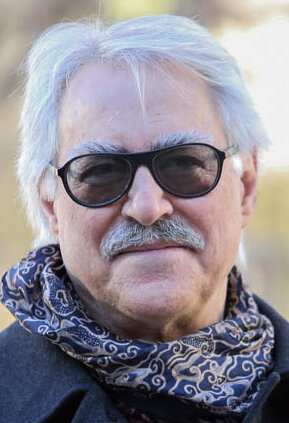
- Javad Tabatabai, 2017
- Born: 14 December 1945
- Died: 28 February 2023 (aged 77)

Academic background
- Education: Paris 1 Panthéon-Sorbonne University (PhD)
- Thesis: Essai sur le discours politique hegelien: genèse, 1793-1806 (1985)
- Doctoral advisor: Jean-Pierre Cot

Academic work
- Institutions: University of Tehran

Seyed Javad Tabatabai Nejad (Persian: سید جواد طباطبایی; 14 December 1945 – 28 February 2023) was an Iranian philosopher and political scientist and historian. He was Professor and Vice Dean of the Faculty of Law and Political Science at the University of Tehran.

== Biography ==
Javad Tabatabai, an Iranian Azeri, was born on 14 December 1945 in Tabriz, Iran. His father was a merchant in the bazaar of Tabriz. He studied theology, law, and philosophy in Tabriz and Tehran, then earned his PhD in political philosophy from the University of Paris 1 Pantheon-Sorbonne, with a dissertation on Hegel's political philosophy. His daughter is Ariane Tabatabai.

After returning to Iran, Tabatabai was Professor and Deputy Dean of the Faculty of Law and Political Science at the University of Tehran. In the mid-1990s, he was dismissed from his posts as both professor and deputy dean for criticizing the ideology of the Iranian government.

He continued his research in other countries such as France, England, Germany and the United States: he was a guest fellow at the Wissenschaftskolleg zu Berlin, as well as at the Moynihan Institute of Global Affairs at Syracuse University. Tabatabai published about 20 books on the history of political ideas in Europe and Iran.

Tabatabai died on 28 February 2023 in Irvine, California, at the age of 77.

== Views ==
Tabatabai presented a controversial theory regarding the causes of the decline of political thought and society in Iran over the last few centuries. His ideas on Iranian decline have affected the intellectual debates on modernity and democracy currently underway in Iran.

Tabatabai's career-long research revolved around this question: “What conditions made modernity possible in Europe and led to its abnegation in Iran?” He answered this question by adopting a “Hegelian approach” that privileged a philosophical reading of history on the assumption that philosophical thought is the foundation and essence of any political community and the basis for any critical analysis of it as well. In 2001, in an interview with Libération, he said that political and ideological Islam are already dead, because they have no plans for modernity.

Tabatabai rejected anti-Iranian irredentism and warned about the perils facing Iran from the provocations of pan-Turkism. Tabatabai defended Persian as Iran's national language and argued that the histories of Turkey and the Republic of Azerbaijan contained many forgeries and fabrications. During one of his lectures in Tabriz, he emphasized that the history of the "Baku Republic" (i.e. the Republic of Azerbaijan) is central to the history of Iran.

== Awards ==
- Knight of the Ordre des Palmes Académiques - Paris (14 July 1995)
- Farabi International Award - Tehran

== Books ==
- Introduction to the History of Political Thought in Iran
- Decline of Political Thought in Iran
- Essay on Ibn Khaldun: Impossibility of Social Sciences in Islam
- Nizam al-Mulk and Iranian Political Thought: Essay on the Continuity of the Iranian Thought
- On Iran: An Introduction to the Theory of Decline of Iran
- On Iran: Tabriz School and Basis of Modernity
- On Iran: The Theory of Constitutionalism in Iran
