= Loghman Pharmaceuticals =

Iranian pharmaceutical company

Loghman Pharmaceutical & Hygienic Co.
- Company type: Public
- Traded as: TSE: DLGM1; ISIN: IRO1DLGM0000
- Industry: Medical equipment; Pharmaceutical
- Founded: 1968; 58 years ago
- Headquarters: Tehran, Iran
- Area served: Worldwide
- Key people: Khosro Davari, chief executive officer Alireza Zohrevand, Chairman
- Products: Pharmaceutical drug Ampoule, Tablet (pharmacy), Capsule (pharmacy)
- Net income: ▲44 Billion IRR (2009)
- Total assets: 437 Billion IRR (2009)
- Website: www.loghmanpharma.com

Loghman Pharmaceutical & Hygienic Co. (Persian: شرکت دارویی و بهداشتی لقمان, Shirkat-e Darvii-ye vâ Behedashiti-ye Laqman) is an Iranian pharmaceuticals company. The company engages in the discovery, development, manufacture, and marketing of drugs in Iran.

== History ==
Loghmans was established in 1968 as I.D.I. Pharmaceuticals. In 1979, the company changed its name to Loghman and expanded its operations.

The company has been listed on the Tehran Stock Exchange since 1997.

== Products ==
- Acetaminophen+Codeine
- Amoxicillin
- Azithromycin
- Buspirone
- Carbamazepine
- Cefalexin
- Cefazolin
- Cefepime
- Cefixime
- Ceftazidime
- Ceftriaxone
- Cefuroxime
- Cefalexin
- Diazepam
- Erythromycin
- Fluconazole
- Sodium Fluoride
- Ibuprofen
- Indomethacin
- Lorazepam
- Losartan Potassium
- Meropenem
- Methimazole
- Nortriptyline
- Phenytoin
- Sodium Fluoride
- Sorbitol
- Valsartan

== Development plan ==
- Insulin

== See also ==
- Health care in Iran
