= Institute for Political and International Studies =

Iranian think tank

- Abbreviation: IPIS
- Formation: 1983
- Type: Think tank
- Headquarters: Shahid Aghaei St., Shahid Bahonar Ave., Niavaran
- Location: Tehran, Iran
- Head of the Institute: Saeed Khatibzadeh
- Affiliations: Ministry of Foreign Affairs, Iran
- Website: IPIS.ir

The Institute for Political and International Studies (IPIS) (Persian: دفتر مطالعات سیاسی و بین‌المللی) is a foreign policy think tank based in Tehran, Iran and affiliated to Iran's Ministry of Foreign Affairs. It was founded in 1983 as one of the first think tanks in Iran after the 1979 Iranian Revolution with the task of leading and encouraging the study and research on issues relevant to the foreign policy of the Islamic Republic of Iran.

The institute has defined its missions within three convergent programs: think-tank and research activities, archive and education. As related to think tank and research activities, the IPIS conducts projects on the issues relating to Iran's foreign policy, carries out applied research on the foreign policy and international relations, and works in close cooperation with think-tanks and research centers, at home and abroad, through holding regular meetings, roundtables and conferences. One of the main objectives pursued by the IPIS is the promotion of literature in the field of IR studies, regional studies and foreign policy. Accordingly, the Institute for Political and International Studies tries to promote understanding about Iran's foreign policy by establishing regular contacts with Iranian as well as foreign intellectuals and researchers.

The IPIS also seeks to assist the national memory of foreign policy in Iran, thanks to the unique archive it hosts and by doing research into this area of study. As the host of a collection of around 50 million first-hand documents about the history of Iran's foreign relations, the IPIS is dedicated to preserving such national treasure, and provides an invaluable source for research on the history of Iran's foreign relations.

The Institute for Political and International Studies makes the results of its researches and studies available to the public through its publications, books and journals, including the monthly Events and Analyses, and three periodicals of Foreign Policy, Central Asia and the Caucasus, and History of Foreign Relations.

The head of the institute is Saeed Khatibzadeh, a senior Iranian diplomat who previously served as spokesperson for the Iranian foreign ministry and as ambassador to Croatia. In 2014 Khatibzadeh proposed the formation of a network called the Iran Experts Initiative (IEI), with the goal of placing second-generation Iranians affiliated with Western think-tanks and academic institutions into "American and European think tanks" and offering them "political support."
