= 1979 Iranian Constitutional Assembly election in Zanjan province =

Iranian Constitutional Assembly election

Zanjan election
3 August 1979

2 Seats to the Assembly for the Final Review of the Constitution
Alliance	Coalition of Islamic Parties	Quintuple Coalition	Septuple Coalition
Seats won	2 / 2	0 / 2	0 / 2

On 3 August 1979, a Constitutional Convention election was held in Zanjan Province (encompassing today's Qazvin Province) with plurality-at-large voting format in order to decide two seats for the Assembly for the Final Review of the Constitution.

The result was a victory for the two candidates supported by the Islamic Republican Party while the candidate of the Combatant Clergy Association was placed third. Members of other parties such as the Muslim People's Republic Party, the Nation Party of Iran and JAMA (the latter endorsed by the Quintuple Coalition) were defeated and the only communist who ran in the constituency received the fewest votes cast.

== Results ==
1979 Constitutional Convention election: Zanjan Province
Party	Candidate	Votes	%
IRP	Hadi Barikbin (Note: Also supported by the Combatant Clergy Association.)	206,932	54.90
IRP	Seyed Esmaeil Mousavi Zanjani	204,461	54.24
CCA	Seyyed Abbas Aboutorabi	123,836	32.85
MPRP	Mohammad-Esmail Saeini	25,764	6.84
NPI	Nasser Takmil Homayoun	19,647	5.21
JAMA	Hadi Motameni (Note: Supported by the Quintuple Coalition.)	12,179	3.23
—	Shoja Ebrahim-Tavani	1,784	0.47
OSEWC	Ebrahim Nazari (Note: Supported by the Septuple Coalition.)	747	0.20
Total votes		376,922	100
Source: "Election Results" (PDF), Enghelab-e-Eslami, no. 42, p. 3, 9 August 1979
