= 1979 Iranian Constitutional Assembly election in Khorasan Province =

Khorasan election
August 1979

All 7 Seats to the Assembly for the Final Review of the Constitution
- Location of the constituency within Iran
- Lists that won seats
	Majority party	Minority party
Party	Islamic Republican Party	Mashhad's Eminent Proofs
Seats won	7 / 7	4 / 7
	Third party	Fourth party
Party	Movement of Militant Muslims	Freedom Movement of Iran
Seats won	1 / 7	1 / 7

Defeated lsts

On 3 August 1979, Constitutional Convention election was held in Khorasan Province constituency with plurality-at-large voting format in order to decide seven seats for the Assembly for the Final Review of the Constitution

It resulted in a landslide victory for the Khomeinist candidates in the Coalition of Islamic Parties who swept all seats. They were followed by clerical rivals of Khomeini, including the leader of Hojjatieh, who were endorsed jointly by Hassan Tabatabaei Qomi and Mohammad al-Shirazi. The top four winning contenders were supported by both groupings, indicating that the former list had approximately twice number of supporters in comparison to the latter. The top candidate of the defeated Quintuple Coalition received no better than 5% of all votes cast, suppressing those supported by the Sunni community. Candidates of non-religious groups such as the left-wing Tudeh Party of Iran and the right-wing Nation Party of Iran could not receive more than a few thousand votes in their favor.

== Result ==
1979 Constitutional Convention election: Khorasan Province
Party	Candidate	Votes	%
IRP	Mahmoud Rouhani (Note: Supported by the electoral list 'Mashhad's Eminent Proofs [of God]' (āyāt-e ezām-e mašḥad).)	949,923	89.44
IRP	Javad Aghatehrani	947,614	89.23
IRP	Abolhassan Shirazi	940,225	88.53
IRP	Ali Falsafi	906,888	85.39
IRP	Jalaleddin Farsi	660,001	62.14
IRP	Mohammad Khamenei	640,958	60.35
IRP	Ali Tehrani (Note: Supported by the Movement of Militant Muslims) (Note: Supported by the Freedom Movement of Iran)	559,639	52.69
—	Mehdi Noghani	366,532	34.51
Hojjatieh	Mahmoud Halabi	307,754	28.98
—	Abbas-Ali Eslami	284,581	26.80
PMOI	Mansour Bazargan (Note: Supported by the Quintuple Coalition)	51,113	4.81
—	Mahmoud Farhoudi (Note: Supported by Health professionals affiliated with the University of Mashhad)	33,067	3.11
—	Shamseddin Motahari (Note: Supported by the Sunni community (aḥl-e tasannon))	32,990	3.11
—	Salaheddin Bayati	30,822	2.90
—	Ahmad Faroughi	30,010	2.83
—	Mohammad-Amin Yaghoubi Jami	29,454	2.77
—	Gholam-Ali Karimdari	29,052	2.74
MMM	Mahmoud Delasaei	26,772	2.52
JAMA	Mehdi Zarif-Asgari	23,976	2.26
MPRP	Fazel Bakhsheshi	7,722	0.73
Tudeh Party	Ali Khavari	6,452	0.61
FMI	Hossein Ansari	4,384	0.41
NPI	Mahmoud Ardakanian	3,358	0.32
NPI	Hossein Barazandeh	2,145	0.20
—	Javad Gholampour	876	0.08
—	Mohammad Nakhaei	836	0.08
—	Gholamhossein Tofighi	710	0.07
Total votes		1,062,044	100
Source: "Election Results" (PDF), Enghelab-e-Eslami, no. 42, p. 3, 9 August 1979
