= 1979 Iranian Constitutional Assembly election in East Azerbaijan province =

East Azerbaijan election
3 August 1979

All 6 Seats to the Assembly for the Final Review of the Constitution
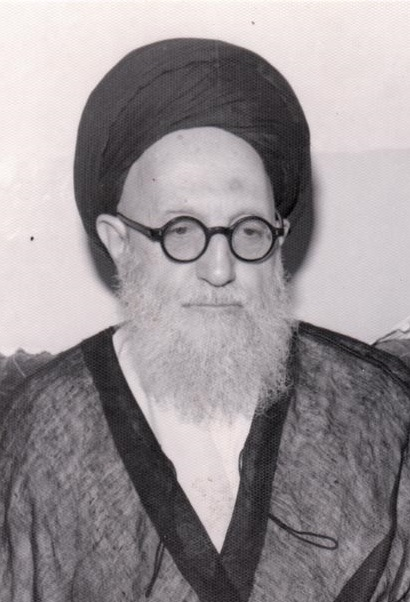

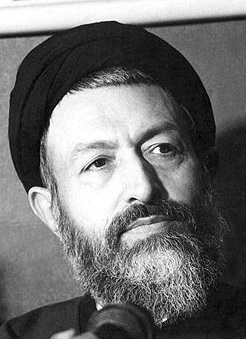
	Majority party	Minority party
Leader	Mohammad Kazem Shariatmadari	Mohammad Beheshti
Party	MPRP	IRP
Seats won	4 / 6	2 / 6

Defeated lsts

On 3 August 1979, a Constitutional Convention election was held in East Azerbaijan Province (also encompassing the present-day Ardabil Province) with plurality-at-large voting format in order to decide all six seats for the Assembly for the Final Review of the Constitution.

The result was a relative victory for the Muslim People's Republic Party (MPRP) over the Islamic Republican Party (IRP). A stronghold of Mohammad Kazem Shariatmadari supporters, it was one of the few constituencies where Khomeinist candidates did not end up winning a landslide. Out of the six seats up for the election, four went to those endorsed by the MPRP while the IRP had listed three winners (one candidates was supported by both). Lay candidates supported by groups such as the Freedom Movement of Iran and the Movement of Militant Muslims were defeated. Khomeini published a fatwa banning the People's Mujahedin of Iran from government elections. Secular nationalists and communists could not receive more than 3% of the votes.

== Results ==
1979 Constitutional Convention election: East Azerbaijan Province
Party	Candidate	Votes	%
MPRP	Jafar Sobhani (Note: Also supported by the Islamic Republican Party)	786,986	87.52
MPRP	Mohammad-Ali Angaji (Note: Also supported by the Radical Movement of Iran) (Note: Also supported by the National Front) (Note: Also supported by Besharat Political Group (gorūḥ-e sīāsī-e bešārat).)	580,854	64.60
MPRP	Jafar Eshraghi	560,793	62.37
MPRP	Rahmatollah Moghaddam Maraghei	458,733	51.02
IRP	Abolfazl Mousavi Tabrizi	446,643	49.67
IRP	Ali Meshkini (Note: Also supported by the Movement of Muslim Women (neḥzat-e zanān-e mosalmān).) (Note: Also supported by Malek Ashtar Monotheistic Organization (sāzmān-e tohīdī-ye mālek-e aštar).)	431,262	47.96
MPRP	Ahmad Alizadeh Khoi	419,601	46.66
MPRP	Abolfath Abolfathi	372,233	41.40
IRP	Mohammad-Ali Sadat	261,667	29.10
IRP	Seyyed Mehdi Golabi	196,738	21.88
IRP	Asghar Neishabouri	181,474	20.18
—	Mohammad Milani-Hosseini (Note: Also supported by the Freedom Movement of Iran) (Note: Also supported by the Movement of Militant Muslims) (Note: Also supported by the Muslim Students of the University of Tabriz)	124,744	13.87
PMOI	Ahmad Hanifnejad (Note: Supported by the Quintuple Coalition)	76,173	8.47
PMOI	Hossein Khosrowshahi	27,966	3.11
MMM	Hassan Efekhar-Ardebili	26,417	2.94
NPI	Mirjavad Mousavi-Khalkhali	20,915	2.33
—	Saeid Rajaei-Khorasani	19,504	2.17
OIPGF	Nematollah Mohammadi-Golehini	17,451	1.94
Tudeh Party	Hossein Joudat	6,728	0.75
Tudeh Party	Anoushirvan Ebrahimi	6,204	0.69
NF	Mohsen Firouzmand-Khalkhali	4,889	0.54
JC	Bagher Mortazavi Khosrowshahi	2,652	0.29
—	Ali Moghaddam	1,952	0.22
—	Mohammad-Bagher Sadri	1,183	0.13
NF	Jalal Ghanizadeh	1,142	0.13
—	Mashallah Talachian	1,141	0.13
SWPI	Mahmoud Seirafizadeh	539	0.06
NF	Manouchehr Malek-Ghassemi	447	0.05
Total votes		899,181	100
Source: "Election Results" (PDF), Enghelab-e-Eslami, no. 42, p. 3, 9 August 1979
