= 1979 Iranian Constitutional Assembly election in Hamedan Province =

Constitution assembly in Iran

Hamedan election
- 3 August 1979

2 Seats to the Assembly for the Final Review of the Constitution
- Location of the constituency within Iran
- Contesting coalitions
Alliance	Coalition of Islamic Parties	Quintuple Coalition
Seats won	2 / 2	0 / 2

Defeated lsts

On 3 August 1979, a Constitutional Convention election was held in Hamedan Province constituency with plurality-at-large voting format in order to decide two seats for the Assembly for the Final Review of the Constitution.

The constituency was a scene of rivalry between candidates of different Islamic groups and no communist or secular nationalist ran for a seat. The result was a landslide victory for the two candidates supported by both the Islamic Republican Party and the Combatant Clergy Association. Members of other parties such as the Muslim People's Republic Party, the Movement of Militant Muslims and JAMA (the latter endorsed by the Quintuple Coalition) were defeated.

== Result ==
1979 Constitutional Convention election: Hamedan Province
Party	Candidate	Votes	%
IRP	Asadollah Madani (Note: Supported by Malek Ashtar Monotheistic Organization (sāzmān-e tohīdī-ye mālek-e aštar).) (Note: Supported by Society for Preserving Unity (jamʾīyyat-e hāfez-e vahdat).) (Note: Supported by the Organization of Holy Warriors in the Path of Truth (sāzmān-e mojāhedān-e rāḥ-e ḥaq).) (Note: Supported by the Organization of the Defenders of Monotheism (sāzmān-e modāfeʾān-e toḥīd).) (Note: Supported by the Combatant Clergy Association)	339,570	94.23
IRP	Kazem Akrami (Note: Supported by the Freedom Movement of Iran)	282,091	78.28
MMM	Ezzatollah Radmanesh	30,642	8.50
MPRP	Mohammad Mirshahvalad	30,082	8.35
JAMA	Yahya Naziri (Note: Supported by the Quintuple Coalition)	8,583	2.38
MPRP	Farrokh Daftari	637	0.18
—	Kaveh	264	0.07
Total votes		360,360	100
Source: "Election Results" (PDF), Enghelab-e-Eslami, no. 39, p. 7, 7 August 1979
