= Iranian legislative election, 1980 (Tehran, Rey and Shemiranat) =

1980 Iranian legislative election
- 1980
- Turnout: 61.13%
Party	Leader	Vote %	Seats	+/–
Combatant Clergy Association	Fazlollah Mahallati	70	21	+21
Islamic Republican Party	Mohammad Beheshti	60	18	+18
Eponym Group	Mehdi Bazargan	30	9	+9
Office for the Cooperation of the People with the President	Abolhassan Banisadr	26.6	8	+8
JAMA	Kazem Sami	13.3	4	+4
Movement of Militant Muslims	Habibollah Payman	10	3	+3
Progressive Revolutionary Candidates	Massoud Rajavi	3.3	1	+1
This lists parties that won seats. See the complete results below.

This is an overview of the 1980 Iranian legislative election in Tehran, Rey and Shemiranat electoral district. It resulted in a victory for Fakhreddin Hejazi of the Islamic Republican Party.

== Results ==
=== First round ===
#	Candidate	List(s)									Votes	%
#	Candidate	IRP	CCA	OCP	EG	NF	MEK	TP	JAMA	MMM	Votes	%
↓ Elected Members ↓
1	Fakhreddin Hejazi	Yes	Yes	Yes	—N/a						1,568,759	73.5
2	Hassan Habibi	—N/a	Yes	Yes	Yes	—N/a					1,552,478	72.7
3	Mehdi Bazargan	—N/a			Yes	—N/a					1,447,316	67.8
4	Ali Akbar Moinfar	Yes	Yes	—N/a	Yes	—N/a					1,439,360	67.4
5	Ali Khamenei	Yes	Yes	—N/a							1,405,976	65.1
6	Mohammad Javad Hojjati Kermani	Yes	Yes	Yes	—N/a				Yes	—N/a	1,390,454	65.1
7	Mohammad Javad Bahonar	Yes	Yes	—N/a							1,385,197	64.8
8	Hassan Ayat	Yes	—N/a								1,364,899	63.9
9	Hadi Ghaffari	Yes	Yes	—N/a							1,338,405	62.7
10	Ali Golzadeh Ghafouri	—N/a	Yes	Yes	—N/a		Yes	—N/a		Yes	1,336,435	62.6
11	Mohammad Mousavi Khoeiniha	Yes	Yes	—N/a					Yes	Yes	1,248,391	58
12	Mohammad Ali Rajai	Yes	Yes	—N/a	Yes	—N/a					1,209,012	56.6
13	Ali Akbar Nategh-Nouri	Yes	—N/a								1,201,933	56.3
14	Akbar Hashemi Rafsanjani	Yes	Yes	—N/a							1,151,514	54
15	Ebrahim Yazdi	—N/a	Yes	—N/a	Yes	—N/a					1,128,304	52.9
16	Azam Taleghani	—N/a		Yes	—N/a						1,108,653	51.9
17	Mostafa Chamran	—N/a	Yes	—N/a	Yes	—N/a					1,100,842	51.5
18	Ezatollah Sahabi	—N/a		Yes	Yes	—N/a			Yes	—N/a	1,070,929	50.2
↓ Went to run-off ↓
19	Mohsen Mojtahed Shabestari	—N/a	Yes	—N/a							941,076	44.1
20	Yadollah Sahabi	—N/a			Yes	—N/a					868,745	40.7
21	Kazem Sami	—N/a		Yes	—N/a				Yes	Yes	835,225	39.2
22	Gohar Dastgheib	Yes	Yes	—N/a							831,722	39
23	Hashem Sabbaghian	—N/a			Yes	—N/a					804,411	37.7
24	Mohammad Tavasoli	—N/a			Yes	—N/a					747,666	35.1
25	Ali Akbar Velayati	Yes	Yes	—N/a							745,110	35
26	Mohammad Hadi-Najafabadi	Yes	Yes	Yes	—N/a						723,161	33.9
27	Habibollah Asgaroladi	Yes	Yes	—N/a							704,228	33
28	Abdolmajid Moadikhah	Yes	—N/a								686,255	32.2
29	Fereshteh Hashemi	—N/a	Yes	—N/a							672,368	31.5
30	Saeed Amani	Yes	—N/a								638,821	30
31	Mohammad-Kazem Mousavi Bojnourdi	Yes	—N/a								623,900	29.3
32	Mohammad-Bagher Hosseini Lavasani	Yes	Yes	—N/a							618,020	29
33	Mehdi Shahabadi	—N/a	Yes	Yes	—N/a						614,375	28.8
34	Mohammad Eslami	—N/a	Yes	Yes	—N/a						599,978	28.1
35	Seifollah Vahid Dastjerdi	Yes	Yes	—N/a							583,394	27.3
36	Fathollah Banisadr	—N/a		Yes	Yes	—N/a					581,337	27.2
37	Mohammad-Reza Tavassoli	—N/a									538,444	25.2
38	Massoud Rajavi	—N/a					Yes	—N/a			531,943	24.9
39	Asadollah Lajevardi	Yes	—N/a								509,939	23.9
40	Reza Zavarei	Yes	—N/a								472,013	22.1
41	Ahmad Molaei	—N/a	Yes	—N/a							469,075	22
42	Abdolali Bazargan	—N/a			Yes	—N/a					455,727	21.4
↓ Defeated candidates ↓
43	Najafgholi Habibi	—N/a	Yes	—N/a							453,375	21.3
44	Hassan Tavanayanfard	—N/a					Yes	—N/a			402,169	18.9
45	Mahmonir Rezaei	—N/a					Yes	—N/a			391,439	18.3
46	Mehdi Abrishamchi	—N/a					Yes	—N/a			390,683	18.3
47	Hossein Kamali	Yes	—N/a								388,293	18.2
48	Mostafa Katiraei	—N/a			Yes	—N/a					385,201	18
49	Abdolkarim Lahiji	—N/a					Yes	—N/a	Yes	—N/a	369,688	17.3
50	Maryam Taleghani	—N/a					Yes	—N/a			368,943	17.3
51	Ali Tehrani	—N/a									364,950	17.1
52	Ashraf Rabiei	—N/a					Yes	—N/a			319,087	15
53	Ozra Taleghani	—N/a					Yes	—N/a			308,541	14.5
54	Azar Shafipour	—N/a									296,194	13.9
55	Mohammad Kashani	—N/a					Yes	—N/a			286,200	13.4
56	Mohammad Maleki	—N/a					Yes	—N/a	Yes	Yes	286,167	13.4
57	Ali Tashayod	—N/a					Yes	—N/a			278,777	13.1
58	Mohammad Shanechi	—N/a					Yes	—N/a		Yes	276,786	13
59	Mehdi Hadavi	—N/a									276,410	13
60	Parviz Yaghoubi	—N/a					Yes	—N/a			275,578	12.9
