= 1979 Iranian Constitutional Assembly election in Fars province =

Fars election
3 August 1979

All 4 Seats to the Assembly for the Final Review of the Constitution
- Location of the constituency within Iran

Defeated lsts

On 3 August 1979, a Constitutional Convention election was held in Fars province constituency with plurality-at-large voting format in order to decide four seats for the Assembly for the Final Review of the Constitution.

All seats went to Khomeinist candidates, who were affiliated with the Society of Seminary Teachers of Qom and the Combatant Clergy Association. The clerical candidates supported by the Muslim People's Republic Party and laymen listed by the Quintuple Coalition were all defeated. Lay candidates fielded by the Islamic Republican Party, including a woman, were also defeated.

== Results ==
1979 Constitutional Convention election: Fars province
Party	Candidate	Votes	%
IRP	Abdolhossein Dastgheib (Note: Supported by the Freedom Movement of Iran) (Note: Supported by the Organization of the Defenders of Monotheism (sāzmān-e modāfeʾān-e toḥīd)) (Note: Supported by Malek Ashtar Monotheistic Organization (sāzmān-e tohīdī-ye mālek-e aštar)) (Note: Supported by the Organization of Holy Warriors in the Path of Truth (sāzmān-e mojāhedān-e rāḥ-e ḥaq)) (Note: Supported by the Muslim Students of Shiraz University)	545,349	88.65
Seminary Teachers	Naser Makarem Shirazi (Note: Supported by the Combatant Clergy Association) (Note: Supported by the Islamic Republican Party)	518,149	84.23
CCA	Abdolrahim Rabbani (Note: Supported by the Movement of Muslim Women (neḥzat-e zanān-e mosalmān))	403,508	65.59
CCA	Monireddin Hosseini Hashemi	294,711	47.91
MPRP	Majdeddin Mahallati (Note: Supported by the Nation Party of Iran)	186,575	30.33
MPRP	Hossein Ayatollahi	119,662	19.45
IRP	Rajabali Taheri (Note: Supported by the Movement of Militant Muslims)	96,141	15.63
PMOI	Mohammad-Javad Baraei (Note: Supported by the Quintuple Coalition)	39,466	6.42
Seminary Teachers	Ahmad Beheshti	33,612	5.46
JAMA	Mohsen Mahlouji	26,074	4.24
IRP	Gohar Dastgheib	23,347	3.80
JAMA	Morteza Kasraeian	18,452	3.00
RO	Iraj Kashkouli	5,455	0.89
Total votes		615,196	100
Source: "Election Results" (PDF), Enghelab-e-Eslami, no. 40, p. 3, 7 August 1979
