= 1979 Iranian Constitutional Assembly election in Isfahan province =

Isfahan election
3 August 1979

All 4 Seats to the Assembly for the Final Review of the Constitution
- Location of the constituency within Iran
- Coalitions that won seats
Alliance	Coalition of Islamic Parties	Quintuple Coalition
Seats won	4 / 4	1 / 4

Defeated lsts

On 3 August 1979, a Constitutional Convention election was held in Isfahan Province constituency with plurality-at-large voting format in order to decide four seats for the Assembly for the Final Review of the Constitution.

The Islamic Republican Party won. Because of conflicts and the major support the People's Mujahedin of Iran received among different minorities and Iranian sectors, Ayatollah Khomeini published a fatwa that prevented the group from taking part in elections of the new government.

Unlike other provinces, the constituency was not contested by groups such as the Freedom Movement of Iran or the Organization of Iranian People's Fedai Guerrillas.

== Results ==
1979 Constitutional Convention election: Isfahan Province
Party	Candidate	Votes	%
IRP	Jalaleddin Taheri (Note: Supported by the Quintuple Coalition) (Note: Supported by the Combatant Clergy Association) (Note: Supported by Malek Ashtar Monotheistic Organization (sāzmān-e tohīdī-ye mālek-e aštar).) (Note: Supported by the Organization of Holy Warriors in the Path of Truth (sāzmān-e mojāhedān-e rāḥ-e ḥaq).) (Note: Supported by the Guerillas of the Oppressed (čerikhā-ye mostazʾafin).) (Note: Supported by the Islamic Trade Union of the Esfahan Steel Company (etteḥād-e eslāmī-e kār-e zob-e āḥan-e esfahān).) (Note: Supported by the Muslim Students of the University of Isfahan.) (Note: Supported by the Organization of the Defenders of Monotheism (sāzmān-e modāfeʾān-e toḥīd).) (Note: Supported by the Society for Preserving Unity (jamʾīyyat-e ḥāfez-e vahdat).)	787,687	83.33
IRP	Ali-Akbar Parvaresh (Note: Supported by the Society of Esfahan Engineers (jameʾe-ye moḥandesīn-e esfaḥān).) (Note: Supported by the Islamic Freedom-seekers Group (goruḥ-e āzādīḵāḥān-e eslāmi).)	710,726	75.19
IRP	Hossein Khademi	585,302	61.92
IRP	Hassan Ayat (Note: Supported by the Movement of Muslim Women (neḥzat-e zanān-e mosalmān).)	479,818	50.76
CCA	Mohammad Emami-Kashani	158,905	16.81
QC	Mohammad Ahmadi-Foroushani	137,623	14.56
—	Ahmad Salamatian	137,022	14.50
CCA	Ahmad Faghih-Emami	63,484	6.72
CCA	Mohammad-Ali Movahed Abtahi	51,858	5.49
—	Ahmad Ghazanfarpour	50,932	5.39
CCA	Hassan Safi	48,075	5.09
—	Javad Gharavi	28,489	3.01
QC	Rahmatollah Khaleghi	10,466	1.11
MPRP	Aboutorab Nafisi	7,205	0.76
—	Hassan Faghih-Emami	5,485	0.58
Tudeh Party	Hossein Azar	5,118	0.54
NPI	Ahmad Gheisari-Esfehanai	3,838	0.41
QC	Abolfazl Mirshams-Shahshahani	3,019	0.32
NPI	Ahmad Yaraghi	1,951	0.21
JC	Asghar Tofangsaz	1,815	0.19
—	Mostafa Shahrtash	1,752	0.19
—	Hossein Aghasharif	1,089	0.12
—	Mohammad-Bagher Farani	1,054	0.11
—	Mohammad-Bagher Khalesi	755	0.08
—	Hossein Morvarid	432	0.05
Total votes		945,285	100
Source: "Election Results" (PDF), Enghelab-e-Eslami, no. 40, p. 3, 7 August 1979
