= Quintuple Coalition =

1979 Iranian electoral alliance

- Founded: 1979
- Ideology: Radicalism
- Religion: Islam
- Assembly for the Final Review of the Constitution: 5 / 73

The Quintuple Coalition refers to the electoral alliance of five revolutionary groups contesting in the 1979 Iranian Constitutional Convention election. The groups in coalition had Islamic and radical orientations. After the elections, the coalition sent an open letter to Ruhollah Khomeini and complained about "fraud".

== Parties in coalition ==
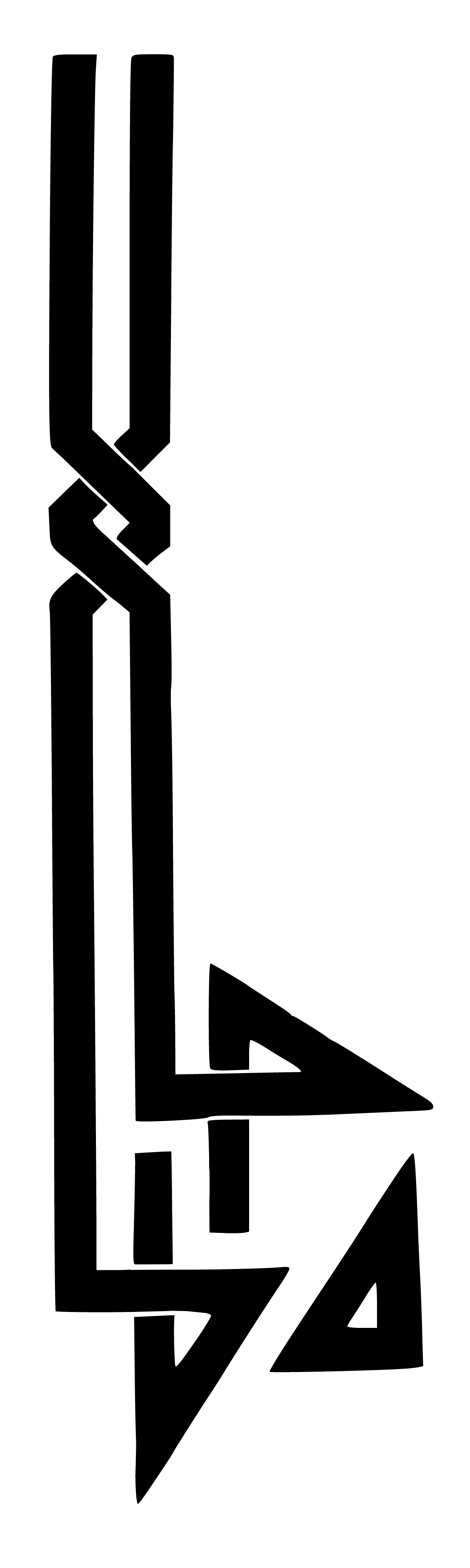
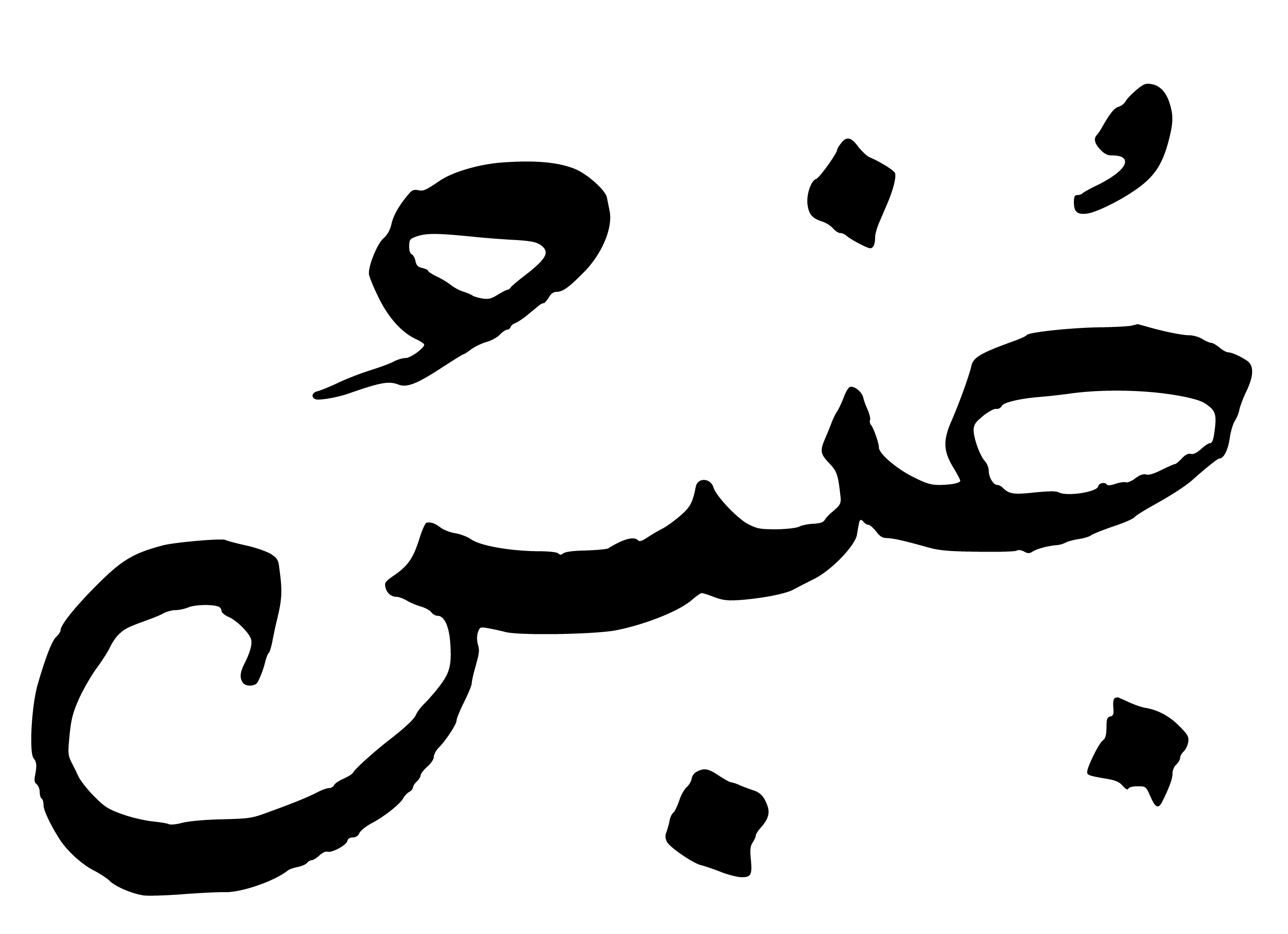
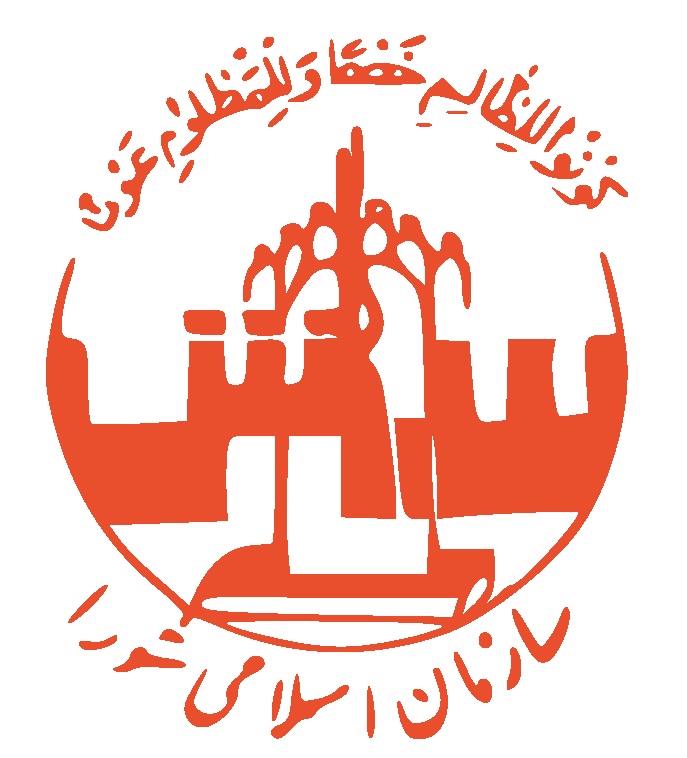
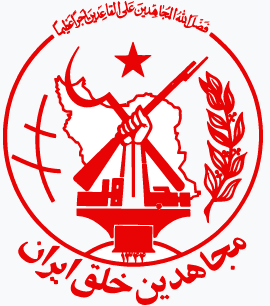
Insignia of the groups in coalition

The five groups were:

- Revolutionary Movement of Muslim People of Iran (JAMA), led by Kazem Sami
- People's Mujahedin Organization (MEK), led by Massoud Rajavi
- Movement of Militant Muslims (MMM), led by Habibollah Peyman
- The Movement for Liberty, led by Asghar Sayyed Javadi – it was a newly-established and relatively small group that belonged to the center
- Islamic Organization of Council (SASH), led by Habibollah Ashouri – The group was only briefly active in 1979

== Candidates ==
On 18 July 1979, the coalition presented its candidates for all 10 seats in Tehran in an announcement published by Ayandegan.

| Constituency | Candidate endorsed | Votes | % | Rank | Result |
|---|---|---|---|---|---|
| Tehran | Mahmoud Taleghani | 2,016,801 | 79.86 | 1st | Won |
| Tehran | Ali Golzadeh Ghafouri | 1,560,970 | 61.81 | 4th | Won |
| Tehran | Ezzatollah Sahabi | 1,449,713 | 57.41 | 6th | Won |
| Tehran | Asghar Sayyed Javadi (Note: Member of the Movement for Freedom) | 298,360 | 11.81 | 11th | Defeated |
| Tehran | Massoud Rajavi (Note: Member of the People's Mujahedin Organization) | 297,707 | 11.79 | 12th | Defeated |
| Tehran | Abdolkarim Lahiji | 179,798 | 7.12 | 14th | Defeated |
| Tehran | Habibollah Peyman (Note: Member of the Movement of Militant Muslims) | 164,644 | 6.52 | 15th | Defeated |
| Tehran | Nasser Katouzian | 110,859 | 4.39 | 21st | Defeated |
| Tehran | Tahereh Saffarzadeh | 101,778 | 4.03 | 22nd | Defeated |
| Tehran | Nezameddin Ghahari (Note: Member of the JAMA) | 36,791 | 1.46 | 31st | Defeated |
| East Azerbaijan | Ahmad Hanifnejad | 76,173 | 8.47 | 13th | Defeated |
| East Azerbaijan | Hossein Khosrowshahi | 27,966 | 3.11 | 14th | Defeated |
| East Azerbaijan | Mousa Sheikhzadegan | Did not run | | | |
| Khorasan | Taher Ahmadzadeh | Did not run | | | |
| Khorasan | Mansour Bazargan | 51,113 | 4.81 | 11th | Defeated |
| Khorasan | Mahmoud Delasaei | 26,772 | 2.52 | 18th | Defeated |
| Khorasan | Sirous Sahami | Did not run | | | |
| Khorasan | Mohammad-Taghi Shariati | Did not run | | | |
| Khorasan | Mehdi Zarif-Asgari | 23,976 | 2.26 | 19th | Defeated |
| Fars | Hassan Asadi-Lari | Did not run | | | |
| Fars | Javad Baraei | 39,466 | 6.42 | 8th | Defeated |
| Fars | Morteza Kasraeian | 18,452 | 3.00 | 12th | Defeated |
| Fars | Mohsen Mahlouji | 26,074 | 4.24 | 10th | Defeated |
| Hamedan | Davoud Milani | Did not run | | | |
| Hamedan | Yahya Naziri | 8,583 | 2.38 | 5th | Defeated |
| Zanjan | Hadi Motameni | 12,179 | 3.23 | 6th | Defeated |
| Zanjan | Karim Seyyed Javadi | Did not run | | | |
| Gilan | Shahbaz Shahbazi | 78,307 | 22.62 | 5th | Defeated |
| Gilan | Taher Khoshkholgh | 15,473 | 4.47 | 9th | Defeated |
| Gilan | Hadi Pourgol | Did not run | | | |
| Isfahan | Jalaleddin Taheri | 787,687 | 83.33 | 1st | Won |
| Isfahan | Mohammad Ahmadi-Foroushani | 137,623 | 14.56 | 6th | Defeated |
| Isfahan | Aboutorab Nafisi | 7,205 | 0.76 | 14th | Defeated |
| Isfahan | Rahmatollah Khaleghi | 10,466 | 1.11 | 13th | Defeated |
| Semnan | Hossein Kharrazi | Did not run | | | |
| Chaharmahal and Bakhtiari | Ahmad Nourbakhsh | 24,753 | 72.92 | 1st | Won |
| Mazandaran | Hassan Akbari-Marznak | | | | Defeated |
| Mazandaran | Morad-Ali Zohari | | | | Defeated |
| Mazandaran | Seifollah Kabirian | | | | Defeated |
| Mazandaran | Abouzar Vardasbi | | | | Defeated |
| Mazandaran | Mohammad-Reza Rouhani | Did not run | | | |

== See also ==
- Coalition of Islamic Parties
- Septuple Coalition
- Grand National Alliance
