= 1979 Iranian Constitutional Assembly election in Lorestan province =

Lorestan election
3 August 1979

2 Seats to the Assembly for the Final Review of the Constitution
Alliance	Coalition of Islamic Parties
Seats won	2 / 2
- Location of the constituency within Iran

On 3 August 1979, a Constitutional Convention election was held in Lorestan Province constituency with plurality-at-large voting format in order to decide two seats for the Assembly for the Final Review of the Constitution.

The result was a landslide victory for the Islamic Republican Party whose candidates received more than 90% of the votes. The candidate of the right-wing nationalist Nation Party of Iran was placed third.

== Results ==
1979 Constitutional Convention election: Lorestan Province
Party	Candidate	Votes	%
IRP	Hassan Taheri Khorramabadi	238,205	94.40
IRP	Seyed Esmaeil Mousavi Zanjani	233,920	92.70
NPI	Khosrow Khosravi	6,405	2.54
—	Issa Farrokhpour	6,227	2.47
—	Mohammad-Bagher Abbasi	2,182	0.86
—	Hassan Nazemi	1,502	0.60
MPRP	Air-Hossein Tajbakhsh	508	0.20
Total votes		252,339	100
Source: "Election Results" (PDF), Enghelab-e-Eslami, no. 42, p. 3, 9 August 1979
