= 1979 Iranian Constitutional Assembly election in Khuzestan province =

Khuzestan election
- 3 August 1979

All 4 Seats to the Assembly for the Final Review of the Constitution
- Location of the constituency within Iran
- Lists that won seats
| | Majority party | Minority party |
|---|---|---|
| Party | Islamic Republican Party | Movement of Militant Muslims |
| Seats won | 3 / 4 | 3 / 4 |
| | Third party | Fourth party |
| Party | Freedom Movement of Iran | Combatant Clergy Association |
| Seats won | 1 / 4 | 1 / 4 |

Defeated lsts

On 3 August 1979, a Constitutional Convention election was held in Khuzestan province constituency with plurality-at-large voting format in order to decide four seats for the Assembly for the Final Review of the Constitution.

The Islamic Republican Party was able to secure three of the seats (two of whom endorsed by the Movement of Militant Muslims), while the fourth winner was only supported by the Movement of Militant Muslims. They were followed by the defeated candidate who was endorsed by both the Combatant Clergy Association and the Freedom Movement of Iran in fifth place. Several communists who belonged to groups advocating different lines (Maoism, Trotskyism and pro-Soviet) also contested in the election but were all defeated by a wide margin. The two candidates of the right-wing Nation Party of Iran received less than 1% of the votes.

== Results ==
1979 Constitutional Convention election: Khuzestan province
| Party | Candidate | Votes | % |
|---|---|---|---|
| IRP | Mohammad Kiavash (Note: Supported by the Movement of Militant Muslims) (Note: Supported by the Freedom Movement of Iran) (Note: Supported by the Movement of Muslim Women (neḥzat-e zanān-e mosalmān).) | 411,647 | 23.51 |
| IRP | Mohammad Karami (Note: Supported by the Combatant Clergy Association) (Note: Supported by Malek Ashtar Monotheistic Organization (sāzmān-e tohīdī-ye mālek-e aštar).) | 397,595 | 22.71 |
| IRP | Mohammad Ali Mousavi Jazayeri | 313,118 | 17.89 |
| MMM | Mohammad Rashidian | 273,489 | 15.62 |
| FMI | Ali Shafiei | 98,882 | 5.65 |
| IRP | Abolghassem Sattarian | 64,239 | 3.67 |
| CCA | Issa Tarsi | 35,604 | 2.03 |
| OIPGF | Nasim Khaksar | 35,017 | 2.00 |
| — | Mehdi Tadayyon (Note: Supported by academics in Ahvaz.) | 32,398 | 1.85 |
| OIPGF | Nasrollah Khaksar | 28,137 | 1.61 |
| CCA | Mohammad-Kazem Danesh | 25,347 | 1.45 |
| FMI | Khodamorad Haddadi | 13,086 | 0.75 |
| — | Rahim Bani-Assad | 12,206 | 0.70 |
| RO | Abbas Saberi | 6,402 | 0.37 |
| NPI | Gholam-Hossein Dehdashti | 4,626 | 0.26 |
| Tudeh Party | Ali-Akbar Mayelzadeh | 4,500 | 0.26 |
| NPI | Khosrow Panahi | 1,911 | 0.11 |
| — | Hamid Nezarat | 494 | 0.03 |
| SWPI | Abdolhamid Shahrabi | 418 | 0.02 |
| Total votes | | 1,750,663 | 100 |
Source: "Election Results" (PDF), Enghelab-e-Eslami, no. 39, p. 7, 7 August 1979
