= 1979 Iranian Constitutional Assembly election in Kermanshahan province =

Iranian Constitutional Assembly election

Kermanshahan election
- 3 August 1979

2 Seats to the Assembly for the Final Review of the Constitution
	Majority party	Minority party
Party	Islamic Republican Party	Freedom Movement of Iran
Seats won	1 / 2	1 / 2
- Location of the constituency within Iran

Defeated lsts

On 3 August 1979, a Constitutional Convention election was held in Kermanshahan Province constituency with plurality-at-large voting format in order to decide two seats for the Assembly for the Final Review of the Constitution.

The Islamic Republican Party and the Freedom Movement of Iran had each supported one of the winning candidates. The leader of the National Front who belonged to a local tribe was notably defeated in the constituency.

== Results ==
1979 Constitutional Convention election: Kermanshahan Province
Party	Candidate	Votes	%
IRP	Mohammad Yazdi (Note: Supported by the Combatant Clergy Association) (Note: Supported by Malek Ashtar Monotheistic Organization (sāzmān-e tohīdī-ye mālek-e aštar).) (Note: Supported by the Organization of Holy Warriors in the Path of Truth (sāzmān-e mojāhedān-e rāḥ-e ḥaq).) (Note: Supported by the Guerillas of the Oppressed (čerikhā-ye mostazʾafin).)	104,732	46.03
FMI	Mousa Mousavi (Note: Supported by the Movement of Militant Muslims) (Note: Supported by the Islamic Society of Students of Razi University)	79,111	34.77
IRP	Ata'ollah Ashrafi Esfahani	50,406	22.15
NF	Karim Sanjabi (Note: Supported by Besharat Political Group (gorūḥ-e sīāsī-e bešārat).) (Note: Supported by the Muslim People's Republic Party.) (Note: Supported by Sanjabi tribe.)	33,013	14.51
FMI	Mohammad Abbaszadegan	20,095	8.83
OIPGF	Sirous Ma'vaei	15,719	6.90
—	Mullah Mohammed Rabii (Note: Supported by Sunni community.)	10,275	4.52
CCA	Mohammad-Bagher Hekmatnia	8,593	3.78
—	Hassan Khamoushi (Note: Supported by Yarsan community.)	7,835	3.44
—	Assad Pirouzi	7,610	3.34
CCA	Mojtaba Hajiakhound	5,240	2.30
Tudeh Party	Reza Shaltouki	4,983	2.19
MPRP	Abdolmajid Jalili	4,849	2.13
CCA	Morteza Nojoumi	1,616	0.71
WSI	Khadijeh Soleimani	574	0.25
NF	Ali Ashraf Manouchehr	454	0.20
—	Mohammad Malek-Azari	365	0.16
—	Mohsen Khorramshahi	252	0.11
Total votes		227,525	100
Source: "Election Results" (PDF), Enghelab-e-Eslami, no. 39, p. 7, 6 August 1979; "Election Results" (PDF), Enghelab-e-Eslami, no. 40, p. 3, 7 August 1979
