= 1979 Iranian Constitutional Assembly election in West Azerbaijan province =

Iranian Election

West Azerbaijan election
- 3 August 1979

All 3 Seats to the Assembly for the Final Review of the Constitution
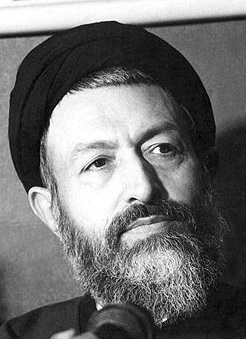

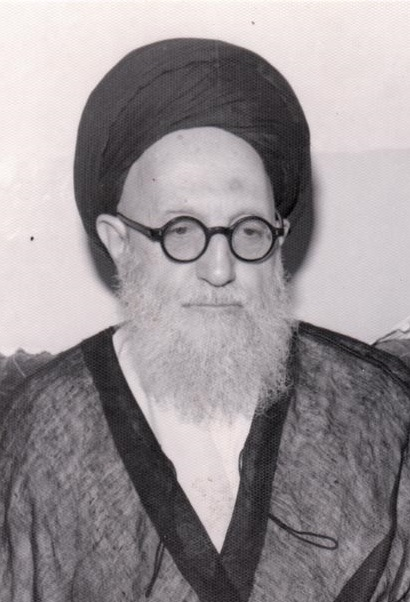
	Majority party	Minority party	Third party
Leader	Mohammad Beheshti	Mohammad Kazem Shariatmadari	Abdul Rahman Ghassemlou
Party	IRP	MPRP	KDPI
Seats won	1 / 3	1 / 3	1 / 3
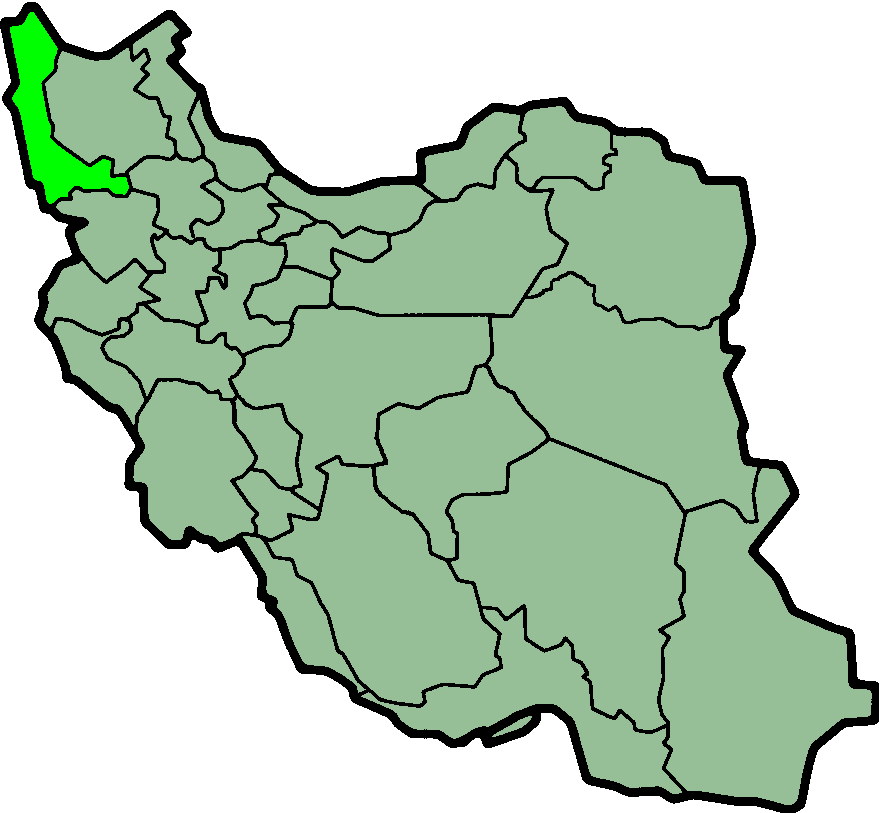
- Location of the constituency within Iran

On 3 August 1979, Constitutional Convention election was held in West Azerbaijan Province constituency with plurality-at-large voting format in order to decide three seats for the Assembly for the Final Review of the Constitution.

Each of the seats in the constituency went to a party. The Khomeinist candidate supported by the Islamic Republican Party was placed first, while the candidate endorsed by the Muslim People's Republic Party of Mohammad Kazem Shariatmadari became second. The two Kurdish candidates who belonged to the Democratic Party of Iranian Kurdistan ended up in the third and fourth places, and the party was able to secure a seat. The Organization of Iranian People's Fedai Guerrillas' nominee received no more than 11% of the votes and was defeated.

== Results ==
1979 Constitutional Convention election: West Azerbaijan Province
Party	Candidate	Votes	%
IRP	Ali Akbar Ghoreishi (Note: Also supported by Malek Ashtar Monotheistic Organization (sāzmān-e tohīdī-ye mālek-e aštar))	152,428	46.88
MPRP	Mohammad Fowzi	117,669	36.19
KDPI	Abdolrahman Ghasemlou	113,773	34.99
KDPI	Ghani Bolourian	103,087	31.70
IRP	Ali-Akbar Ghaffari	101,215	31.13
—	Mollarahim Abbasi	50,802	15.62
—	Ghodratollah Atabak	39,936	12.28
OIPGF	Mohammad-Anvar Soltani Boukani	34,628	10.65
Total votes		325,156	100
Source: "Election Results" (PDF), Enghelab-e-Eslami, no. 39, p. 7, 7 August 1979
