= 1979 Iranian Constitutional Assembly election in Gilan province =

Gilan election
3 August 1979

All 3 Seats to the Assembly for the Final Review of the Constitution
- Location of the constituency within Iran

Defeated lsts

On 3 August 1979, a Constitutional Convention election was held in Gilan Province constituency with plurality-at-large voting format in order to decide three seats for the Assembly for the Final Review of the Constitution.

All seats went to Khomeinist candidates, who were affiliated with the Islamic Republican Party, the Society of Seminary Teachers of Qom and the Combatant Clergy Association. The clerical candidate supported by the Freedom Movement of Iran was placed fourth, ahead of a People's Mujahedin of Iran member listed by the Quintuple Coalition. Communist candidates of different groups were also all defeated, though they received a higher percentage of votes in comparison to communists in other provinces.

== Results ==
1979 Constitutional Convention election: Gilan Province
Party	Candidate	Votes	%
Seminary Teachers	Mohammad-Mehdi Rabbani (Note: Also supported by the Combatant Clergy Association.) (Note: Also supported by the Freedom Movement of Iran.) (Note: Also supported by the Islamic Republican Party.)	216,525	62.56
CCA	Abdollah Ziaeinia (Note: Supported by Malek Ashtar Monotheistic Organization (sāzmān-e tohīdī-ye mālek-e aštar).)	207,628	59.99
IRP	Hassan Azodi	159,397	46.05
FMI	Zeinolabedin Ghorbani (Note: Also supported by the Movement of Muslim Women (neḥzat-e zanān-e mosalmān).)	81,724	23.61
PMOI	Shahbaz Shahbazi (Note: Supported by the Quintuple Coalition)	78,307	22.62
CCA	Sadegh Ehsanbakhsh	56,715	16.39
OIPGF	Mohammad-Reza Joshani Amlashi	41,861	12.09
Tudeh Party	Mahmoud Etemadzadeh	19,884	5.74
—	Taher Khoshkholgh	15,473	4.47
WW	Hassan Hesam	12,641	3.65
—	Ebrahim Faghih-Mohammadi	9,376	2.71
—	Mehdi Zamiri	3,251	0.94
—	Abbas Daneshkhah	3,031	0.88
—	Mahmoud Aghajani Ghazimahalleh	2,567	0.74
NPI	Khalil Khalilpour Darestani	1,994	0.58
WSI	Masoumeh Zamiri	668	0.19
Total votes		346,114	100
Source: "Election Results" (PDF), Enghelab-e-Eslami, no. 41, p. 3, 8 August 1979
