= 1979 Iranian Constitutional Assembly election in Sistan and Baluchestan province =

Sistan and Baluchestan election
3 August 1979

2 Seats to the Assembly for the Final Review of the Constitution
	Majority party
Leader	Abdul Aziz Malazada
Party	Muslim Union Party
Seats won	2 / 2
- Location of the constituency within Iran

On 3 August 1979, a Constitutional Convention election was held in Sistan and Baluchestan Province with plurality-at-large voting format in order to decide the two seats for the Assembly for the Final Review of the Constitution.

Both candidates who won the election belonged to the Sunni Baloch community in the province. The Shia cleric supported by the Islamic Republican Party was defeated.

== Results ==
1979 Constitutional Convention election: Sistan and Baluchestan Province
Party	Candidate	Votes	%
MUP	Abdulaziz Mullazadeh (Note: Also supported by the Movement of Militant Muslims and the Islamic Republican Party)	140,770	73.21
MUP	Hamidollah Mir-Moradzehi	133,123	69.23
IRP	Mohammad-Taghi Hosseini (Note: Also supported by the Muslim People's Republic Party)	unknown	unknown
MPRP	Mohammad-Gol Barahouei	unknown	unknown
Total votes		192,288	100
Source: "Election Results" (PDF), Ettela'at, no. 15922, p. 2, 6 August 1979
