= 1979 Iranian Constitutional Assembly election in Kerman province =

Iranian Constitutional Assembly election

Kerman election
3 August 1979

2 Seats to the Assembly for the Final Review of the Constitution
Alliance	Coalition of Islamic Parties
Seats won	2 / 2
- Location of the constituency within Iran

On 3 August 1979, a Constitutional Convention election was held in Kerman Province constituency with plurality-at-large voting format in order to decide two seats for the Assembly for the Final Review of the Constitution.

Only five candidates ran for the two seats, which both went to those endorsed by the Coalition of Islamic Parties in absence of many rival groups. The candidate supported by the Freedom Movement of Iran was placed fifth with less than 1% of the votes cast.

== Results ==
1979 Constitutional Convention election: Kerman Province
Party	Candidate	Votes	%
IRP	Mohammad-Javad Hojjati (Note: Also supported by the Combatant Clergy Association.) (Note: Also supported by the Movement of Muslim Women (neḥzat-e zanān-e mosalmān).) (Note: Also supported by Malek Ashtar Monotheistic Organization (sāzmān-e tohīdī-ye mālek-e aštar).)	211,589	82.49
IRP	Mohammad-Javad Bahonar (Note: Also supported by the Women's Society of the Islamic Revolution.) (Note: Also supported by the Organization of Holy Warriors in the Path of Truth (sāzmān-e mojāhedān-e rāḥ-e ḥaq).)	205,765	80.22
—	Mohammad Hasehmian	41,342	16.12
—	Mohammad-Esmail Saeini	30,942	12.06
FMI	Mohammad-Bagher Mahdavi Khanouki	1,775	0.69
Total votes		256,488	100
Source: "Election Results" (PDF), Enghelab-e-Eslami, no. 41, p. 3, 8 August 1979
