= Grand National Alliance (Iran) =

- Founded: July 1979
- Assembly for the Final Review of the Constitution: 2 / 73

The Grand National Alliance (Persian: اتحاد بزرگ ملّی, romanized: etteḥād-e bozorg-e mellī) was a secular electoral alliance contesting in the 1979 Iranian Constitutional Convention election. The candidates listed by this coalition mostly included communists and nationalists.

== Parties in coalition ==
The groups named in the coalition's declaration of existence, were:

- Revolutionary Organization (sāzmān-e enqelābī) and its youth wing the Revolutionary Youth Organization (sāzmān-e javānān-e enqelābī), a Maoist group split from the Tudeh Party of Iran which was later merged into the Laborers' Party of Iran
- Iranian Women's Society (jamʿiyat-e zanān-e Īrān)
- Justice Society (jamʿiyat-e edālat)
- Confederation of Iranian Students (konfederāsīūn-e jahānī-e moḥaṣṣelīn wa dānešjūyān-e īrānī)
- The Flag of Sattar Khan (səttar xan bayrağı), an Azeri-language publication which later became aligned with the Laborers' Party of Iran
- United Campaign for Establishment of the Working Class Party (etteḥād-e mobāraza dar rāh-e ījād-e hezb-e ṭabaqa-ye kārgar), later merged into the Laborers' Party of Iran

== Candidates ==
The candidates endorsed by the coalition for Tehran Province, were:

Constituency	Candidate endorsed	Group	Votes	%	Rank	Result
Tehran	Mahmoud Taleghani	FMI (Note: The party itself was not part of this coalition)	2,016,801	79.86	1st	Won
Tehran	Abolhassan Banisadr	—	1,763,126	69.82	2dnd	Won
Tehran	Habibollah Peyman	MMM	164,644	6.52	15th	Defeated
Tehran	Hassan Nazih	FMI	44,765	1.77	30th	Defeated
Tehran	Lotfollah Meisami	PMM	11,274	0.45	41st	Defeated
Tehran	Parvaneh Forouhar	NPI	8,110	0.32	43rd	Defeated
Tehran	Ali Sadeghi	RO	3,473	0.14	47th	Defeated
Tehran	Majid Zarbakhsh	UCEWCP	2,719	0.11	50th	Defeated
Tehran	Farideh Garman	WS	2,685	0.11	51st	Defeated
Tehran	Hadi Soudbakhsh	JS	990	0.04	66th	Defeated
Source: "Condition of Parties" (PDF), Ettela'at, no. 15919, p. 10, 1 August 1979

Of the ten candidates, only two won the election who were also listed by the Coalition of Islamic Parties. Four belonged to the coalition partners, who were all defeated. They included communists Ali Sadeghi, Majid Zarbakhsh, Farideh Garman and Hadi Soudbakhsh.

Farideh Garman was an architect who had just returned to Iran after settling for 14 years in Italy.

Majid Zarbakhsh (born 1940 in Abadan, Iran) was a former student leader who had arrived in the West Germany to study and was involved in anti-Shah protests with German students associated with the New Left. In August 1969, as a secretary of the Confederation of Iranian Students (CISNU) he went to Jordan and participated in the congress of the General Union of Palestinian Students, before visiting Ruhollah Khomeini in Najaf to ensure him that CISNU was both anti-imperialist and anti-Zionist. He also agreed to consider publishing more onn Islamic aspects of opposition to Shah in that meeting. He was, along with Bahman Nirumand and Mehdi Khanbaba-Tehran, part of the triumvirate of the 'Cadres of the Revolutionary Organization', an organization split from the 'Revolutionary Organization of the Tudeh Party' which was itself an offshoot of the Tudeh Party of Iran.

The provincial candidates who were supported at least by one of the coalition partners were:

Constituency	Candidate endorsed	Group	Votes	%	Rank	Result
Tehran	Khalil Haghighat	JS	131	0.01	90th	Defeated
Fars	Iraj Kashkouli	RO	5,455	0.89	13th	Defeated
Gilan	Hossein Hosseinkhani-Moghadam	RO	Did not run			
Gilan	Masoumeh Zamiri	WS	668	0.19	16th	Defeated
Khuzestan	Ali Saberi	RO	6,402	0.37	14th	Defeated
Isfahan	Asghar Tofangsazi	JS	1,815	0.19	20th	Defeated
Kermanshahan	Khadijeh Soleimani	WS	574	0.25	15th	Defeated
East Azerbaijan	Bagher Mortazavi Khosrowshahi	JS	2,652	0.29	22nd	Defeated

== See also ==
- Coalition of Islamic Parties
- Quintuple Coalition
- Septuple Coalition
