= 1979 Iranian Constitutional Assembly election in Markazi province =

Markazi election
3 August 1979

2 Seats to the Assembly for the Final Review of the Constitution
Alliance	Coalition of Islamic Parties
Seats won	2 / 2

On 3 August 1979, a Constitutional Convention election was held in Markazi Province (encompassing today's Qom Province) with plurality-at-large voting format in order to decide two seats for the Assembly for the Final Review of the Constitution.

Only four candidates, who were all clerics, ran for the two seats. It resulted in a victory for the candidates supported by the Islamic Republican Party and its allies, in absence of their rival parties. Sadegh Khalkhali who also ran for a seat in Tehran Province at the same time (both without support of the Coalition of Islamic Parties), ended up in the third place.

== Results ==
1979 Constitutional Convention election: Markazi Province
Party	Candidate	Votes	%
Seminary Teachers	Morteza Haeri Yazdi (Note: Supported by the Combatant Clergy Association) (Note: Supported by the Islamic Republican Party)	392,491	93.17
Seminary Teachers	Lotfollah Safi Golpaygani	259,537	61.61
CCA	Sadegh Khalkhali	90,680	21.53
—	Mohammad Ale Eshaq	60,098	14.27
Total votes		421,248	100
Source: "Election Results" (PDF), Ettela'at, no. 15922, p. 2, 6 August 1979
