= Results of the 1979 Iranian Constitutional Assembly election =

This article contains the results of the 1979 Iranian Constitutional Assembly election.

== Single-seat constituencies ==
=== Semnan ===
Candidate	Party	Votes	%
Abolghasem Khazali	Islamic Republican Party	107,311	98.89
Ahmad Danesh	Tudeh Party of Iran	1,209	1.11
Total		108,520	100.00
Valid votes		108,520	99.90
Invalid/blank votes		108	0.10
Total votes		108,628	100.00
Source: "Election Results" (PDF), Ettela'at, no. 15922, p. 2, 6 August 1979

=== Bushehr ===
Candidate	Party	Votes	%
Mohammad-Hassan Nabavi	Islamic Republican Party (Note: Also supported by: Combatant Clergy Association; Society of Seminary Teachers of Qom; Malek Ashtar Monotheistic Organization (sāzmān-e tohīdī-ye mālek-e aštar))	74,472	78.02
Mohammad-Mehdi Jafari	Freedom Movement of Iran (Note: Also supported by the Movement of Militant Muslims)	20,637	21.62
Mohammad-Reza Irani	Nation Party of Iran	341	0.36
Total		95,450	100.00
Source: "Election Results" (PDF), Enghelab-e-Eslami, no. 39, p. 7, 6 August 1979

=== Ilam ===
Candidate	Party	Votes	%
Abdolrahman Heidari	Combatant Clergy Association	40,961	78.99
Gholamali Heidari Khajepour	Islamic Republican Party	5,548	10.70
Kazem Soleimannejad	National Front	2,754	5.31
Ali-Akbar Rezvanfar	Nonpartisan	2,593	5.00
Total		51,856	100.00
Source: "Election Results" (PDF), Enghelab-e-Eslami, no. 39, p. 7, 6 August 1979

=== Yazd ===
Candidate	Party	Votes	%
Mohammad Sadoughi	Islamic Republican Party (Note: Also supported by: Freedom Movement of Iran; Combatant Clergy Association; Organization of Holy Warriors in the Path of Truth (sāzmān-e mojāhedān-e rāḥ-e ḥaq); Movement of Muslim Women (neḥzat-e zanān-e mosalmān); Organization of the Defenders of Monotheism (sāzmān-e modāfeʾān-e toḥīd); Guerillas of the Oppressed (čerikhā-ye mostazʾafīn); Islamic Freedom-seekers (āzādīḵᵛāhān-e eslamī))	143,670	99.22
Mashallah Amini	Nonpartisan	1,129	0.78
Total		144,799	100.00
Valid votes		144,799	99.75
Invalid/blank votes		367	0.25
Total votes		145,166	100.00
Source: "Election Results" (PDF), Enghelab-e-Eslami, no. 39, p. 7, 6 August 1979; "Election Results" (PDF), Ettela'at, no. 15922, p. 2, 6 August 1979

=== Armenian community ===
Candidate	Party	Votes	%
Hrair Khalatian	Nonpartisan	8,228	59.96
Viguen Zargarian	Nonpartisan	3,225	23.50
Darvish Ashot-Sinai	Nonpartisan	2,270	16.54
Total		13,723	100.00
Source: "Election Results" (PDF), Enghelab-e-Eslami, no. 39, p. 3, 6 August 1979

=== Zoroastrian community ===
Candidate	Party	Votes	%
Rostam Shahzadi	Nonpartisan	2,090	60.84
Faramarz Zia-Tabari	Nonpartisan	913	26.58
Shahrokh Vakhshouri	Nonpartisan	318	9.26
Sohrab Khodabakhshi	Nonpartisan	114	3.32
Total		3,435	100.00
Source: "Election Results" (PDF), Enghelab-e-Eslami, no. 39, p. 3, 6 August 1979

=== Jewish community ===
Candidate	Party	Votes	%
Aziz Daneshrad	Nonpartisan	8,927	100.00
Total		8,927	100.00
Total votes		8,979	–
Source: "Election Results" (PDF), Enghelab-e-Eslami, no. 39, p. 3, 6 August 1979

=== Assyrian community ===
Candidate	Party	Votes	%
Sergen Bait Ushana	Nonpartisan	5,159	100.00
Total		5,159	100.00
Total votes		5,164	–
Source: "Election Results" (PDF), Enghelab-e-Eslami, no. 39, p. 3, 6 August 1979
