= 1979 Iranian Constitutional Assembly election in Kordestan Province =

In August 1979, a Constitutional Convention election was held in parts of the Kordestan Province with plurality-at-large voting format in order to decide two seats for the Assembly for the Final Review of the Constitution.

== Results ==
1979 Constitutional Convention election: Kordestan Province
Party	Candidate	Votes	%
—	Hossein-Ali Rahmani	35,190	42.41
—	Javad Fatehi	24,393	29.40
CIP	Ahmad Moftizadeh (Note: Withdrew)	~~22,764~~	~~27.44~~
OIPGF	Saremoddin Sadegh-Vaziri	22,155	26.70
KPIP	Yousef Ardalan	8,000	9.64
CIP	Moradi	~~3,082~~	~~3.71~~
—	Jalal Hosseini (Note: Withdrew and endorsed both Sadegh-Vaziri and Ardalan)	~~2,730~~	~~3.29~~
—	Hossein Shafeie	2,651	3.20
KDPI	Hossein Khalighi	~~1,943~~	~~2.34~~
OIPGF	Behrouz Soleimani	~~1,391~~	~~1.68~~
Total votes		82,973	100
Source: "Election Results" (PDF), Enghelab-e-Eslami, no. 40, p. 3, 7 August 1979; "Election Results" (PDF), Ayandegan, no. 3418, pp. 1, 12, 6 August 1979
