= Nezameddin Ghahari =

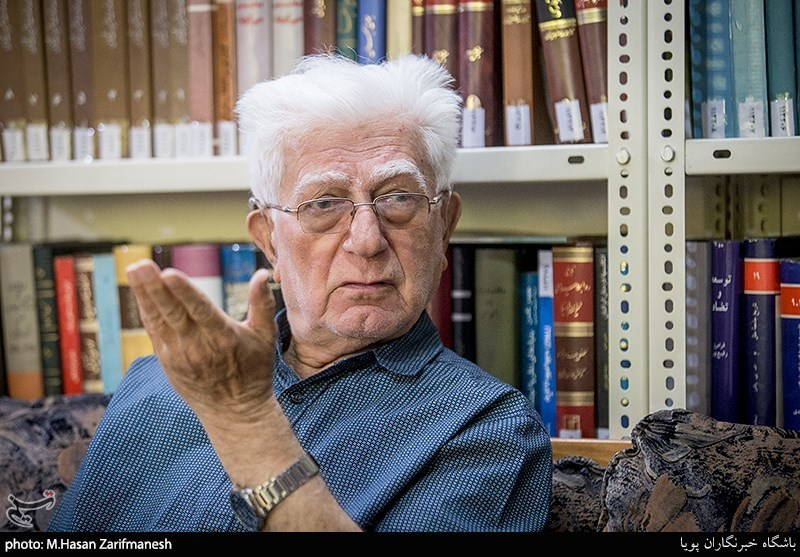
Nezameddin Ghahari

Nezameddin Ghahari (also spelled Nezam ad-Din Qahari; Persian: نظام‌الدین قهاری) is an Iranian physician and nationalist-religious politician affiliated with JAMA.

== Political career ==
In the early 1950s, Ghahari was a friend of Ali Shariati in Mashhad and regularly attended lectures at Center for the Propagation of Islamic Truths. In summer 1951, he joined Iran Party as a result of attraction towards the Movement of God-Worshipping Socialists.

Following the Iranian Revolution in 1979, he was included in the list of candidates supported by the Quintuple Coalition for the Assembly for the Final Review of the Constitution in the Tehran Province constituency.

In May 2010, he supported the trilateral Tehran Nuclear Declaration between Iran, Brazil and Turkey; and urged the Iranian government in July 2012 to "build public confidence in domestic affairs" in order to strengthen national unity and to resolve the nuclear dossier, along with like-minded activists.

Party political offices
Preceded by Kazem Sami	Secretary-General of the JAMA; 1988–present	Incumbent
