= Grand National Alliance =

Grand National Alliance may refer to:

- Grand National Alliance (Guatemala)
- Grand National Alliance (Iran)
- Grand National Alliance (Dominican Republic)
