= Septuple Coalition =

- Leader: Collective leadership
- Founded: July 1979
- Ideology: Communism; Marxism–Leninism
- Political position: Far-left
- Assembly for the Final Review of the Constitution: 0 / 73

The Septuple Coalition was the electoral alliance of seven communist political groups contesting in the 1979 Iranian Constitutional Convention election with the stated objective of "exposé". The alliance endorsed candidates of the Organization of Iranian People's Fedai Guerrillas –which was not part of the coalition– despite political differences.

Their main base of support came from lower and lower-middle class students. The leading candidate in the list was Morteza Aladpoush who received only 49,979 votes in Tehran constituency.

== Stance ==
They rejected the draft constitution as a "proof of bourgeois treason against the revolution and the people" and the way the Assembly for the Final Review of the Constitution was mandated by the Council of the Islamic Revolution. As quoted by Ayandegan):

The constitutional assembly which was promised to be held in the beginning would have provided the opportunity for some progressive elements, democratic and even leftists to find their way to the assembly and turn it into a scene of involvements between the forces which want to continue the revolution and the ones which want to stop and take it backwards. So, they created a new assembly by the name of Majles-e-Khebregan (The Experts Assembly) and imposed it on the people, so that with the few number of representatives, the labor representatives and those of hard working class could not get into the assembly in a short period of time the assembly would sign the official document for the cruel leadership of the ruling forces.

— Aladpush

== Parties in coalition ==
The groups in coalition were:

- Organization of Working-class Freedom Fighters (sāzmān-e razmandagān-e āzādī-e ṭabaqa-ye kārgar), simply known as 'Razmandegan'
- Organization of Struggle for the Emancipation of the Working Class (sāzmān-e peykār dar rāh-e āzādī-e ṭabaqa-ye kārgar), simply known as 'Peykar'
- Group for the Combat for Emancipation of the Working Class (Persian: گروه نبرد برای آزادی طبقه کارگر, romanized: Gorūh-e nabard barā-ye āzādī-e ṭabaqa-ye kārgar), a small Iranian group that refused to accept joining Organization of Struggle for the Emancipation of the Working Class. It published Nabard, and its leader was Amir-Hossein Ahmadian.
- The United Campaign for Fulfillment of the Working Class Aspirations (Persian: اتحاد مبارزه در راه آرمان طبقه کارگر, romanized: etteḥād-e mobāraza dar rāh-e ārmān-e ṭabaqa-ye kārgar), a small communist party. The group mainly consisted of Marxist Mojahedin members who refused to join the Organization of Struggle for the Emancipation of the Working Class (Peykar). A split in the organization weakened it, and the remaining members joined the Union of Iranian Communists. Other members who allied with the Warriors for the Freedom of the Working Class, eventually formed the Worker-communist Party of Iran.
- People's Freedom Fighters of Iran (mobārezīn-e āzādī-e ḵalq-e Īrān)
- The Nexus (payvand)
- Fighters of the Working-class' Way (mobārezān-e rāh-e ṭabaqa-ye kārgar)

== See also ==
- Coalition of Islamic Parties
- Quintuple Coalition
- Grand National Alliance
