= JAMA (political party) =

- Abbreviation: JAMA
- Secretary-General: Nezameddin Ghahari
- Founders: Kazem Sami; Habibollah Payman
- Founded: 1964; 62 years ago as The Liberation Movement of the People of Iran; 1977; 49 years ago as The Revolutionary Movement of the Muslim People of Iran
- Split from: Party of the Iranian People
- Ideology: Islamic socialism Iranian nationalism Anti-imperialism
- Political position: Centre-left
- Religion: Islam
- National affiliation: Quintuple Coalition (1979)

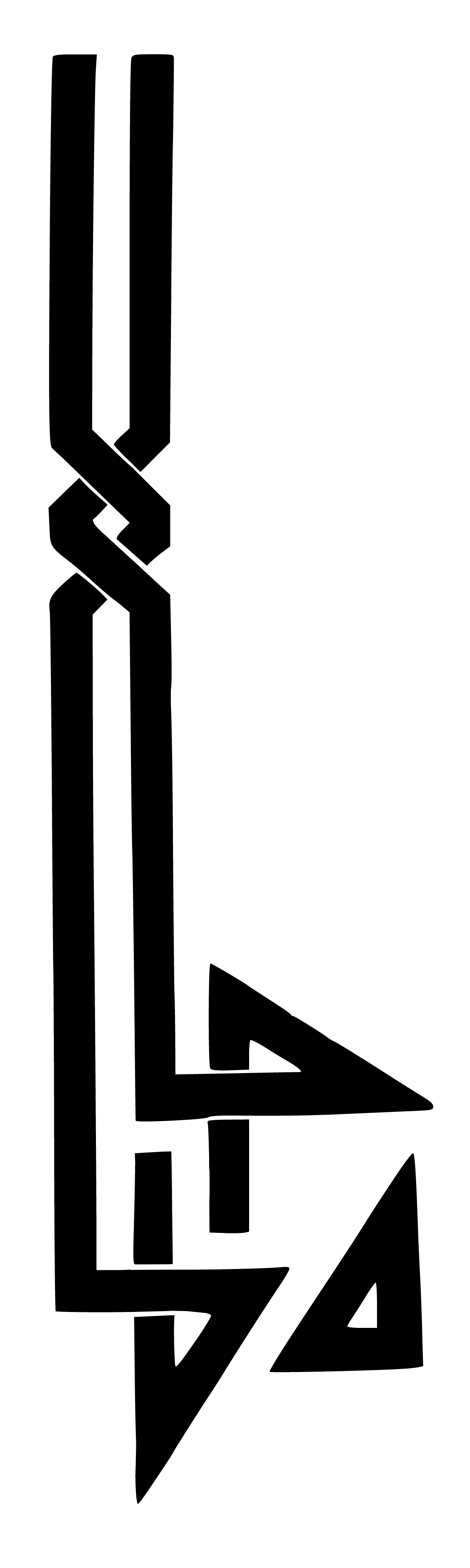
The typography printed on the cover of a JAMA publication

JAMA (Persian: جاما) is an Iranian political party founded in 1964. The party which was mainly active between 1979 and 1981 and a junior partner in the Cabinet of Bazargan, had been outlawed throughout much of its history due to dissenting the rule of both Pahlavi regime and the Islamic Republic.

== History ==
JAMA, an acronym standing for 'The Liberation Movement of the People of Iran' (Persian: جنبش آزادی‌بخش مردم ایران, romanized: jonbeš-e āzādībaḵᵛš-e mardom-e īrān), was founded in 1964 by a number of radical members of the Party of the Iranian People who were led by Kazem Sami and Habibollah Payman. They had come to the conclusion that armed resistance is the best strategy to confront the government following the 1953 coup d'état. In summer 1965, members of the party including the two leaders were arrested which led to effective disruption of their plans. However, the organization continued to exist in small clandestine circles.

In 1977, the leaders of the group split ways. Payman founded the Movement of Militant Muslims while Sami revived the organization with the same acronym, but standing for 'Revolutionary Movement of Muslim People of Iran' (Persian: جنبش انقلابی ملت مسلمان ایران, lit. 'jonbeš-e enqelābī-e mellat-e mosalmān-e īrān'). Sami then became the secretary-general of JAMA. A de facto alliance was shaped in the wake of Iranian Revolution, in late fall 1979, between various clerical factions, the Freedom Movement of Iran, the National Front and JAMA. The party became subsequently a junior partner in the Interim Government of Iran led by Mehdi Bazargan.

JAMA formed an electoral pact with four other Islamic groups to compete in the elections for the Assembly for the Final Review of the Constitution, becoming part of the Quintuple Coalition. It also nominated Sami for the 1980 presidential election who ended up in the 6th place with 89,270 votes, constituting 0.63% of the total. Sami was endorsed by 'The Council of the Guilds of the Tehran Bazaar' during the election campaign. JAMA fielded candidates for the 1980 Iranian legislative election, and Sami who was a candidate in Tehran constituency received 835,225 votes in the first round and was qualified for the run-off.

Remnants of JAMA became associated with the nationalist-religious tendency and the Council of Nationalist-Religious Activists of Iran.

== Ideology ==
The ideological lineage of JAMA can be traced back to the Movement of God-Worshipping Socialists, whose second generation members made up the majority of its founding members. The party was a proponent of Islamic socialism and was classified as centre-left on political spectrum. Ervand Abrahamian describes JAMA as "a small intellectual group using Koranic quotations to legitimize socialistic concepts". 'Neither East, nor West', the foreign policy slogan of the post-revolutionary government was advocated by Kazem Sami, who said "we will oppose any kind of hegemony and thus we will not accept imperialist interventions".
