= Radical Movement of Iran =

- Founder: Rahmatollah Moghaddam Maraghei
- Founded: December 1977
- Dissolved: 1980
- Ideology: Liberalism; Progressivism

The Radical Movement of Iran (Persian: نهضت راديكال ايران) was a political party in Iran during the Iranian Revolution. The party was allied with the Muslim People's Republic Party, and opposed to the clerical Islamic Republican Party.

Many members of the party were former associates of the Third Force and the others were involved in 1961 teachers' strike led by Mohammad Derakhshesh. Some of them were employees of education and justice ministries. The Radical Movement called for the rule of law, release of political prisoners and end of brutality and torture by security forces.
