= Grand coalition (Iran) =

The Grand Coalition
- Founders: Ali Khamenei; Mehdi Shahabadi
- Founded: 1980
- Preceded by: Coalition of Islamic Parties
- Ideology: Islamism
- Religion: Islam

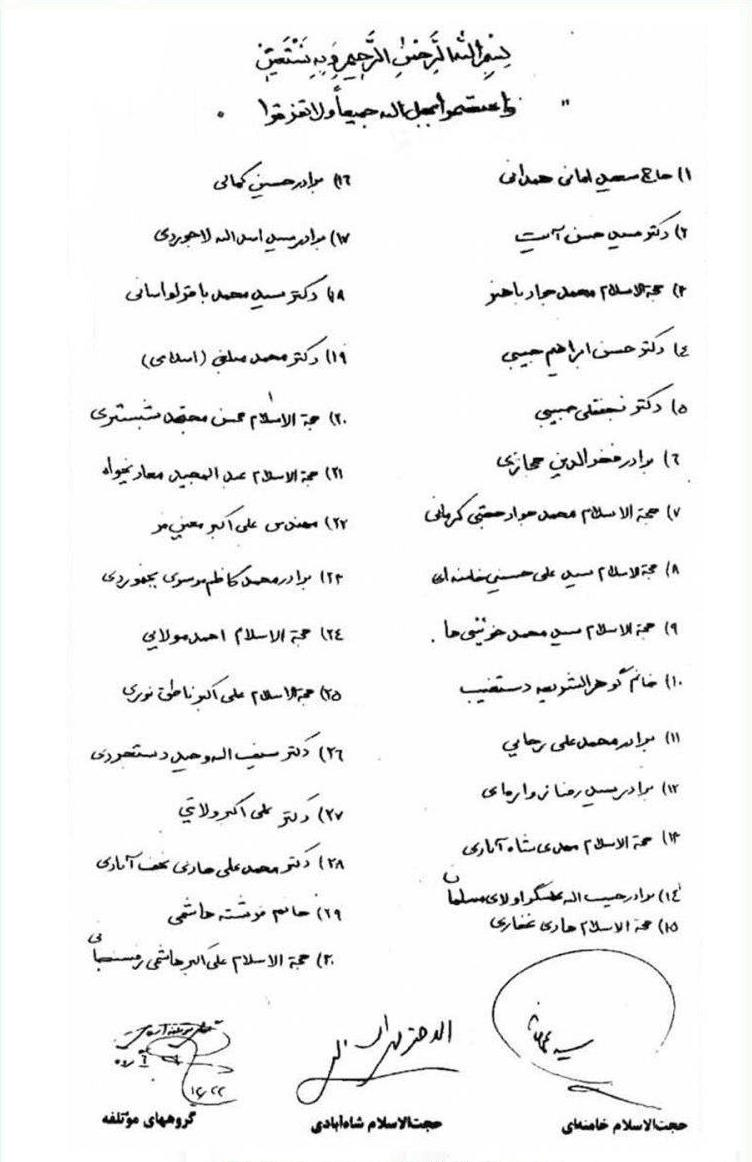
The Grand Coalition of Imam's Line Forces

The Grand Coalition (Persian: ائتلاف بزرگ) was the political alliance of Islamist groups contesting in the 1980 Iranian legislative election, led by the Islamic Republican Party. Various small fundamentalist groups joined the alliance.

Other notable groups in the alliance include Combatant Clergy Association, Mojahedin of the Islamic Revolution Organization, Islamic Coalition Societies and Islamic Association of Teachers.

The coalition won the elections, especially in the provinces and dominated the parliament.
