= Hassan Ayat =

Iranian politician (1938–1981)

Seyyed Hassan Ayat
- حسن آیت
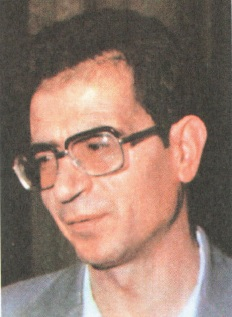

Member of Parliament
- In office 28 May 1980 – 5 August 1981
- Constituency: Tehran, Rey and Shemiranat

Member of Assembly of Experts for Constitution
- In office 15 August 1979 – 15 November 1979
- Constituency: Isfahan Province

Personal details
- Born: 24 June 1938 Najafabad, Iran
- Died: 5 August 1981 (aged 43) Tehran, Iran
- Party: Islamic Republican Party (1979–1981); Toilers Party of the Iranian Nation (1961–1979)
- Education: University of Tehran

Hassan Ayat (24 June 1938 – 5 August 1981) was an Iranian politician. He was member of Parliament of Iran in first assembly after the Iranian Revolution and also member of Assembly of Experts for Constitution.

== Early life ==
He was born on 24 June 1938 in Najafabad, Isfahan. After spending time in studying elementary and secondary schools in Najafabad, He moved to Tehran for higher education and was graduated from University of Tehran. He was a classmate with Abulhassan Banisadr. He was journalist from 1958 to 1965 and was worked in Ettela'at.

== Career ==
Ayat was a member of Zahmatkeshan Party before the Iranian Revolution but resigned from the party. Ayat joined the Islamic Republican Party and became a member of its central committee. He was elected as a member of Assembly of Experts for Constitution in Constitutional Convention election. After that, Ayat was elected as a member of Parliament from Tehran. He was one of the main leaders in impeachment of President Abulhassan Banisadr. He was killed when he was on his way to submit the hard evidence by some in front of his house.

== Assassination ==
On 5 August 1981, five days after Hafte Tir bombing, Ayat was assassinated by People's Mujahedin of Iran in front of his house by two men who then escaped on motorcycles.
