= 1980 Iranian legislative election =

← 1975	14 March and 9 May 1980	1984 →

All 270 seats to the National Consultative Assembly 136 seats are needed for a majority
- Registered: 20,758,391
- Turnout: 52.14%
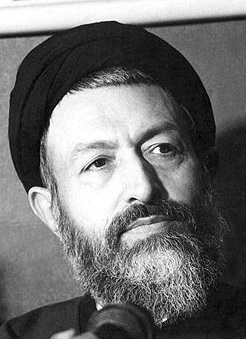

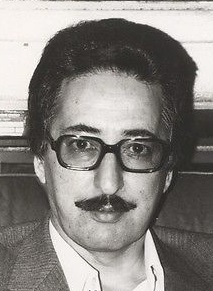

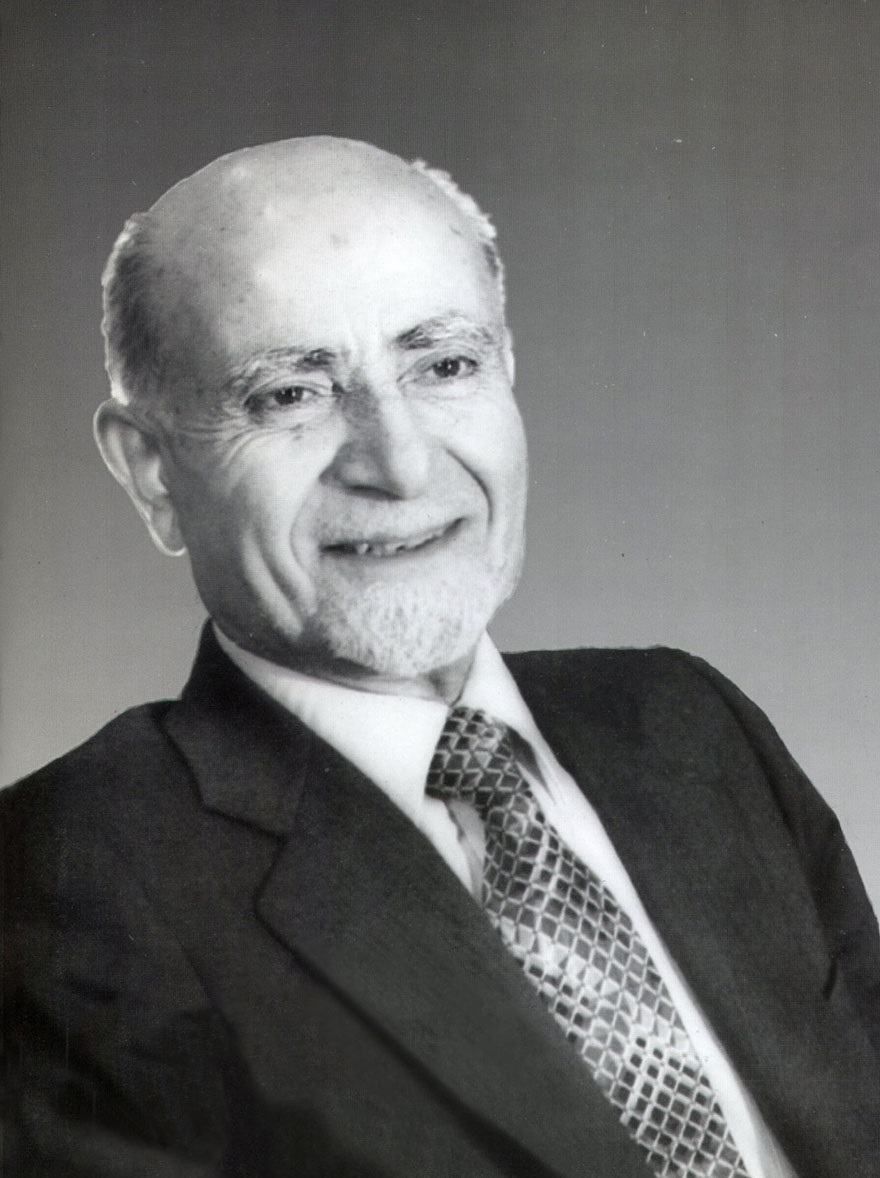

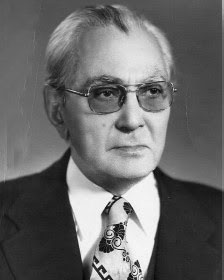
	First party	Second party
Leader	Mohammad Beheshti	Abolhassan Banisadr
Party	Parties: Islamic Republican Party; Combatant Clergy Association; Islamic Coalition Society; Mojahedin of the Islamic Revolution Organization; Islamic Association of Teachers	—
Alliance	Grand Coalition	President Office
Leader's seat	Did not Stand	Did not Stand
Seats won	85	33
Percentage	31.48%	12.12%
	Third party	Fourth party
Leader	Mehdi Bazargan	Karim Sanjabi
Party	—	Parties: Iran Party; Party of the Iranian People
Alliance	Eponym Group	National Front
Leader's seat	Tehran, Rey and Shemiranat	Kermanshah (withdrew)
Seats won	20	4 (Note: Ahmad Madani (Kerman), Khosrow Qashqai (Shiraz), Ali Ardalan (Tuiserkan) and Abolfazl Qassemi (Dargaz). Credentials of all were rejected. National Front member Ahmad Salamatian (Isfahan) ran under the banner of President Office.)
Percentage	7.40%	1.48%
- Composition of the Assembly following the election
Head of government before election
Abolhassan Banisadr (Temporarily, as First Secretary of the Council of the Islamic Revolution)
Independent
Elected Prime Minister
Mohammad-Ali Rajai
Islamic Republican Party

Parliamentary elections were held in Iran on 14 March 1980, with a second round on 9 May. They were the first elections to the Majlis since the overthrow of the Shah, and were contested to a considerable degree on a party basis.

It resulted in a victory for the Islamic Republican Party, which won 85 of the 270 seats, whilst its allies won a further 45. The party, joined by smaller Islamist groups in the Grand coalition was a highly organized force and put up candidates in most constituencies and dominated the campaigns, especially in the provinces.

President Abolhassan Banisadr and his followers, presented dozens of candidates in Tehran and provinces under the list Office for the Cooperation of the People with the President.

The Freedom Movement of Iran which failed to organize effectively, fielded at most only 40 candidates under the banner of Eponym Group and won about 20 seats.

Among National Front candidates, four won the election but their credentials was rejected on the grounds such as being "landlord" or "American agent" and they were not allowed to take their seat. Its leader Karim Sanjabi withdrew in the run-off because of the alleged "irregularities".

Under the name Progressive Revolutionary Candidates list, People's Mujahedin of Iran endorsed 127 nominees nationwide and the official counts gave them as much as 20% of the votes in some constituencies, however they failed to win any seats. Its leader Massoud Rajavi received 531,943 votes in Tehran but was defeated in the run-offs.

Tudeh Party lacked popularity and did poorly, with their highest ranked candidate in Tehran receiving only some 100,000 votes. The party was unable to persuade other left-wing groups to unite.

== Electoral system ==
The constitution approved in a December 1979 referendum provided for a 270-seat Majlis, with five seats reserved for minority groups including Jews, Zoroastrians, Armenians from the north and south of the country and one jointly elected by Assyrians.

As there was no electoral law at the time of the elections, they were held in accordance with a proposal from the Ministry of the Interior and approved by the Council of the Revolution. However, the elections were postponed in 23 constituencies in Kurdistan province and Sistan and Balochistan Province.

== Results ==
137 of the elected MPs were clerics.

Ettela'at newspaper (1980)

Fraction	%	Seats
Independents	42.59%	115
Grand Coalition	31.48%	85
Office for the Cooperation of the People with the President	12.12%	33
Eponym Group	7.40%	20
Total	100%	270
Source: Ettela'at

Thapar (1980)

Camp	Total seats
Islamic Republican Party	130
Supporters of Banisadr (claimed)	74
Independents, Centrists and Seculars	38
Vacant	28
Total	242
Source: R. S. Thapar

Abrahamian (1989)

Fraction	Seats
Islamic Republican Party	120
Pro-Banisadr	33
Independents	33
Freedom Movement	20
National Front	5
Democratic Party of Iranian Kurdistan	2
Total	216
Source: Abrahamian

Nohlen et al (2001)

Party	Votes	%	Seats
Islamic Republican Party			85
Islamic Republican Party allies			45
Independents			140
Invalid/blank votes		–	–
Total	10,874,470	100	270
Registered voters/turnout	21,749,000	50.00	–
Source: Nohlen et al
