= Nasser Takmil Homayoun =

Iranian historian (1936–2022)

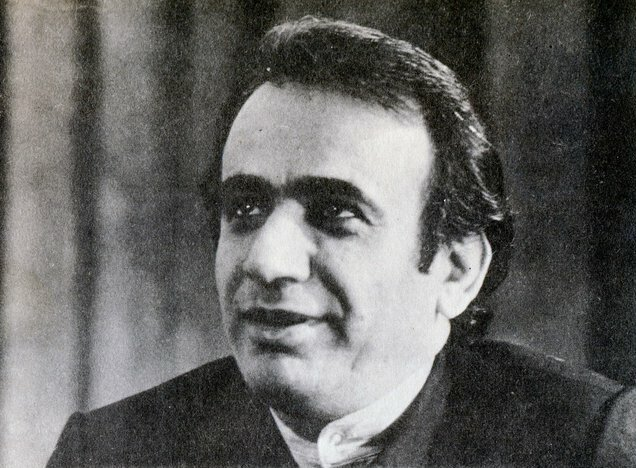
Nasser Takmil Homayoun in 1980

Nasser Takmil Homayoun (Persian: ناصر تکمیل همایون; 23 November 1936 – 16 November 2022) was an Iranian historian.

Takmil Homayoun was born in Qazvin on 23 November 1936. He received two PhDs, one in history (1972) and another in Sociology (1977) from the Sorbonne in France.

Some of his works include The Social and Cultural History of Tehran (in three volumes), The Educational systems and Institutions in ancient Iran, six volumes in the "What do I know about Iran" series, as well as over 50 published articles in various publications.

Takmil Homayoun died on 16 November 2022, at the age of 85.

== See also ==
- Higher education in Iran
- Modern Iranian scientists, scholars, and engineers
