= Habibollah Peyman =

Iranian politician

- حبیب‌الله پیمان
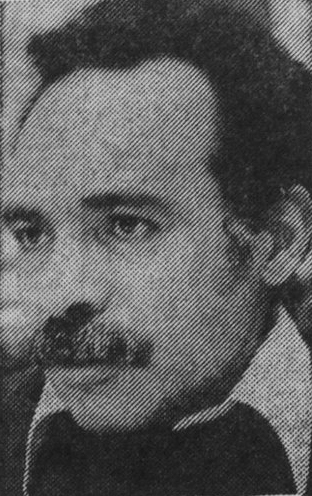
- Peyman in 1979
- Born: 1935 (age 90–91); Shiraz, Imperial State of Iran
- Political party: Council of Nationalist-Religious Activists of Iran (2000–present); Movement of Militant Muslims (1977–present); JAMA (1964–1977); Iranian People Party (1961–1964); Movement of God-Worshipping Socialists (1949–1953); Iran Party (1949–1961)

Habibollah Peyman (Persian: حبیب‌الله پیمان; born 1935) is an Iranian politician. He is the founder and the leader of an Islamist Socialist political party, named Jonbesh Moslamanan Mobarez, which is banned by the religious government of Iran. He is also one of the leaders of the influential Iranian opposition political alliance, the Nationalist-Religious Forces. This is a group of politicians, academic thinkers (such as Ezzatollah Sahabi, Yousefi Eshkevari and Ebrahim Yazdi) and some parties, who are known to believe in Islamic studies and nationalist interests at the same time.

Although he fought against the pre-revolution government of the Shah, Peyman has spent some years in prison for spreading his political ideas, and especially because of his involvement in the nationalist-religious movement, in the Islamic Republic era too.

He has couple of published articles and books, on political issues, theoretical debates over human's freedom in Quran and Islam, Socialism and Islamic ideology. He and his party might be considered as the left wing of the nationalist-religious movement in Iran.

== Sources ==
- Article title

Party political offices
New title	Secretary-General of the Movement of Militant Muslims; 1977–present	Incumbent
