= Kazem Sami =

Iranian politician

- کاظم سامی
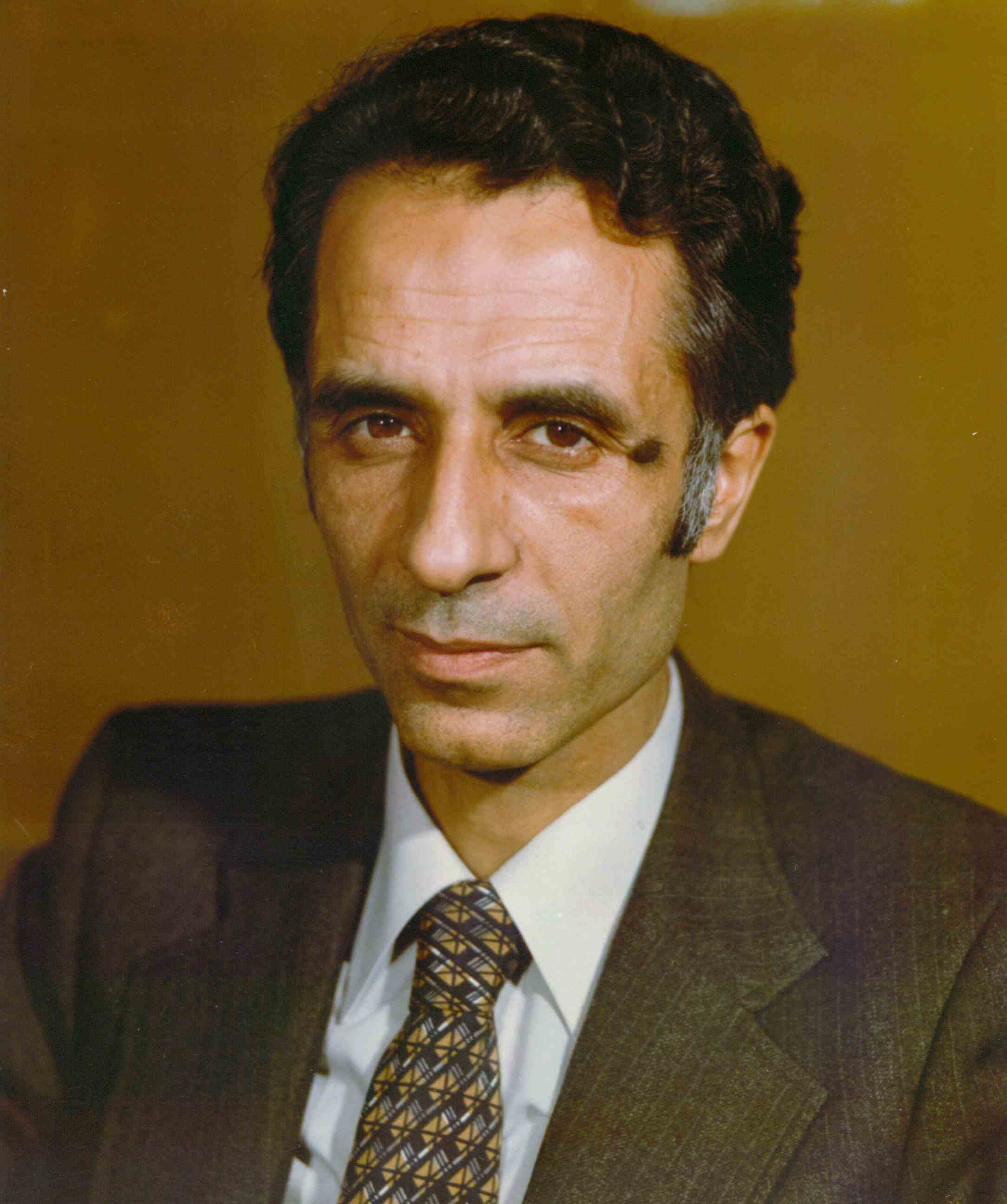

Minister of Health
- In office 13 February 1979 – 29 October 1979
- Prime Minister: Mehdi Bazargan
- Preceded by: Manouchehr Razmara
- Succeeded by: Mousa Zargar

Member of Parliament of Iran
- In office 28 May 1980 – 28 May 1984
- Constituency: Tehran, Rey and Shemiranat
- Majority: 819,186 (50.1%)

Personal details
- Born: Kazem Sami Kermani; 1935 Mashhad, Pahlavi Iran
- Died: 23 November 1988 (aged 52–53) Tehran, Iran
- Party: JAMA
- Children: 2

Kazem Sami Kermani (Persian: کاظم سامی کرمانی; 1935 – 23 November 1988) was Iran's minister of health in the transitional government of Mehdi Bazargan and leader of The Liberation Movement of People of Iran (JAMA).

== Political career ==
Kazem Sami was one of the leaders and organizers of the Iranian revolution. He served as the minister of health in the Iran's interim government, making him Iran's first minister of health after the Iranian Revolution of 1979. He ran in the first Iranian presidential elections, but lost to Abolhassan Banisadr, coming sixth out of the seven presidential candidates. He served as a deputy in the first post-revolutionary Iranian Parliament. After distancing himself from the revolutionary government, Dr Sami remained one of the few active opposition leaders in Iran, openly criticizing the Islamic Republic government. He also wrote a famous open letter to Ayatollah Khomeini, criticizing him for the continuation of the Iran-Iraq war after Iran had recovered her occupied territories, notably the liberation of Khorramshahr.

== Murder ==
Sami was murdered in his private medical clinic in 1988, under suspicious circumstances. He is believed to be one of the first victims of the "chain murders", a series of murders and disappearances of Iranian dissident intellectuals in the 1990s.

== See also ==
- List of unsolved murders (1980–1999)

Government offices
Preceded by Manouchehr Razmara	Minister of Health; 1979	Succeeded by Mousa Zargar
Non-profit organization positions
Preceded by Shams Pahlavi	President of the Iranian Red Lion and Sun Society; 1979–1980	Succeeded by Ali Behzadnia
Party political offices
New title	Secretary-General of the JAMA; 1977–1988	Succeeded by Nezameddin Ghahari
