= Party of the Iranian People =

Party of the Iranian People حزب مردم ایران
- Presidium: 1962
- Founder: Mohammad Nakhshab
- Founded: 1949
- Split from: Iran Party
- Merged into: National Front
- Ideology: Islamic socialism Iranian nationalism Republicanism
- Religion: Islam
- National affiliation: National Front

The Party of the Iranian People or Iran's People's Party (Persian: حزب مردم ایران hezb-e mardom-e Irân) was an Iranian political organization within the National Front and 'National Resistance Movement'. The party was based on a similar line followed by the Movement of God-Worshipping Socialists and an Islamic socialist–Iranian nationalist platform.
