= Movement of God-Worshipping Socialists =

Movement of God-Worshipping Socialists نهضت خداپرستان سوسیالیست
- Abbreviation: NKPS
- Leader: Muhammed Nakhshab
- Founded: 1943
- Dissolved: Post-1947
- Ideology: Islamic socialism Iranian nationalism
- Political position: Left-wing
- Religion: Shia Islam
- National affiliation: National Front

Movement of God-Worshipping Socialists (Persian: نهضت خداپرستان سوسیالیست, romanized: Nahzat Khoda Parastan-e Sosialist) was an Iranian political party. The party was one of six original member organizations of the National Front. The party was led by Muhammed Nakhshab.

The organization was founded in 1943, through the merger of two groupings, Nakhshab's circle of high school students at Dar al-Fanoun and Jalaleddin Ashtiyani's circle of about 25 students at the Faculty of Engineering at Tehran University. The organization was initially known as League of Patriotic Muslims. It combined religious sentiments, nationalism and socialist thoughts.

Nakhshab is credited with the first synthesis between Shi'ism and European socialism. Nakhshab's movement was based on the tenet that Islam and socialism were not incompatible, since both sought to accomplish social equality and justice. His theories had been expressed in his B.A. thesis on the laws of ethics.

In 1944, the group changed name to World Movement of God-Fearing Socialists. At the time the clandestine group had around 70 members. In 1945, the name Movement of God-Fearing Socialists was adopted.

The movement had strict regulations on its members. There was a two-three months probatory period for prospective members, under which they had to prove their religious and moral commitments.

At the time of the elections to the 15th Majlis, the movement first tested to involve itself in electoral politics. Whilst the organization itself remained clandestine and did not field candidates of its own, its members helped campaign for Mossadeqist candidates. The electoral work caused an internal rift inside the movement between Ashtiyani (who considered that the ideals of the movement were sacrificed for the sake of electoral politics) and Nakhshab (who favoured more political activism and developing the movement into a political party).
