= Mohammad Beheshti =

Iranian Islamic cleric and politician (1928–1981)

Ayatollah Seyyed Mohammad Beheshti
- محمد بهشتی
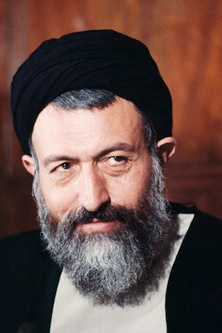
- Beheshti in 1980

2nd Chief Justice of Iran Head of Supreme Court of Iran
- In office 23 February 1980 – 28 June 1981
- Appointed by: Ruhollah Khomeini
- Succeeded by: Abdul-Karim Mousavi Ardebili

Head of Council of the Islamic Revolution
- In office 9 September 1979 – 7 February 1980
- Preceded by: Mahmoud Taleghani
- Succeeded by: Abolhassan Banisadr

Member of the Assembly of Experts for Constitution
- In office 15 August 1979 – 15 November 1979
- Constituency: Tehran Province
- Majority: 1,547,550 (60.93%)

Personal details
- Born: 24 October 1928 Isfahan, Imperial State of Persia
- Died: 28 June 1981 (aged 52) Tehran, Islamic Republic of Iran
- Cause of death: Hafte Tir bombing
- Resting place: Hafte Tir Mausoleum
- Party: Islamic Republican Party
- Spouse: Ezatolsharia Modares Motlagh
- Children: 4
- Education: University of Tehran
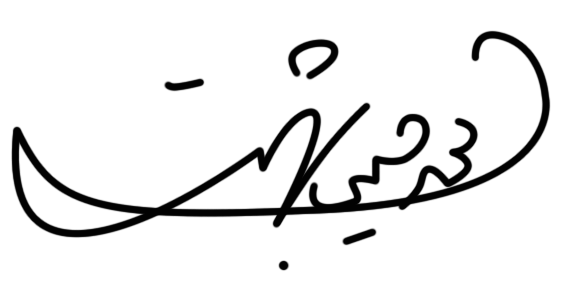
- Signature

Mohammad Hosseini Beheshti (Persian: محمد حسینی بهشتی; 24 October 1928 – 28 June 1981) was an Iranian jurist, poetic philosopher, cleric and politician who was known as the second person in the political hierarchy of Iran after the Revolution. Beheshti is considered to have been the primary architect of Iran's post-revolution constitution, as well as the administrative structure of the Islamic republic. Beheshti is also known to have selected and trained several prominent politicians in the Islamic Republic, such as former presidents Hassan Rouhani and Mohammad Khatami, Ali Akbar Velayati, Mohammad Javad Larijani, Ali Fallahian, and Mostafa Pourmohammadi. Beheshti also served as the Secretary General of the Islamic Republic Party, and was the head of the Iranian judicial system. He further served as Chairman of the Council of Islamic Revolution, and the Assembly of Experts. Beheshti earned a PhD in philosophy, and was fluent in English, German and Arabic.

On 28 June 1981, Beheshti was assassinated in the Hafte tir bombing by the People's Mujahedin of Iran (MEK), along with more than 70 members of the Islamic Republic Party, including four cabinet ministers and 23 members of parliament. The Iranian government implicated Mohammad Reza Kolahi as the MEK operative involved in the incident. Following his death, Ayatollah Khomeini referred to Beheshti as a person who was "as a nation for us."

== Early years and education ==
Beheshti was born in Isfahan in 1928. He studied both at the University of Tehran and under Muhammad Husayn Tabatabaei in Qom. Between 1965 and 1970, he led the Islamic Center in Hamburg where he was responsible for the spiritual leadership of religious Iranian students in Germany and western Europe. In Hamburg, he also worked with Mohammad Khatami and was among his influences. From the early 1960s he was involved in activities against the monarchy and was arrested several times by the Shah's secret police, the SAVAK.

Beheshti joined Ayatollah Khomeini in Najaf, Iraq, where the latter was in exile. There he became part of Khomeini's underground movement.

== Career ==
Following the Islamic revolution, Beheshti became one of the original members of the Council of Revolution of Iran and soon its chairman. As vice-president, he played a particularly important role in promoting the principle of velayat-e faqih as the basis for the new constitution. In the first post-revolutionary Iranian parliament, he led the Islamic Republic party together with Ali Akbar Hashemi Rafsanjani. (However, he never campaigned for the parliament, for he was already the head of Iran's Supreme Judicial System). Beheshti was the founding member, first general secretary and a central committee member of the party. He was also planning to run for the presidency in the first presidential elections, but withdrew after Ayatollah Khomeini told a delegation of Rafsanjani and Khamenei that he preferred non-clerics as presidents, which led to the Islamic Republic party's endorsement of (firstly) Jalaleddin Farsi and (subsequently) Hasan Habibi as candidate.

== Assassination ==
On 28 June 1981, Beheshti was killed in the Hafte tir bombing during a party conference. A spokesman for Iran's revolutionary guards said in an interview that a People's Mujahedin of Iran member, Mohammad Reza Kolahi, had been responsible.

According to James Buchan, the Islamic Republic of Iran first blamed the Tudeh Party, SAVAK, and the Iraqi regime. Two days later, Ruhollah Khomeini accused the MEK. A few years later, a Kermanshah tribunal executed four "Iraqi agents" for the incident. Another tribunal in Tehran executed Mehdi Tafari for the same incident. In 1985, the head of military intelligence informed the press that this had been the work of royalist army officers. Iran's security forces blamed the United States and "internal mercenaries".

Along with Beheshti, many clerics, ministers, and officials also died in the bombing. Supreme Leader Ayatollah Khomeini was reportedly very moved by Beheshti's death. A commemoration ceremony is organized each year on the day of Beheshti's assassination.

== Works ==
Beheshti authored numerous books during his life. After his death, around 24 books were written about him during 30 years. Some of the books are the product of his lectures. Some of his works were translated into Arabic. Some of them are as follows:

- Background of the birth of Islam (translated to English)
- Philosophy of Islam
- Dos and Don'ts
- Al Ghavaed Va Al Feghhiyat
- Islamic Economy
- Right and Fault
- Pilgrimage in Quran
- Unity in Quran
- The Problem of Property
- God from the Viewpoint of the Quran
- Banking and Financial Laws in Islam
- What Do We Know about the Political Party?
- Review and Analysis of Jihad, Justice, Liberalism, Imamate
- School and Specialty

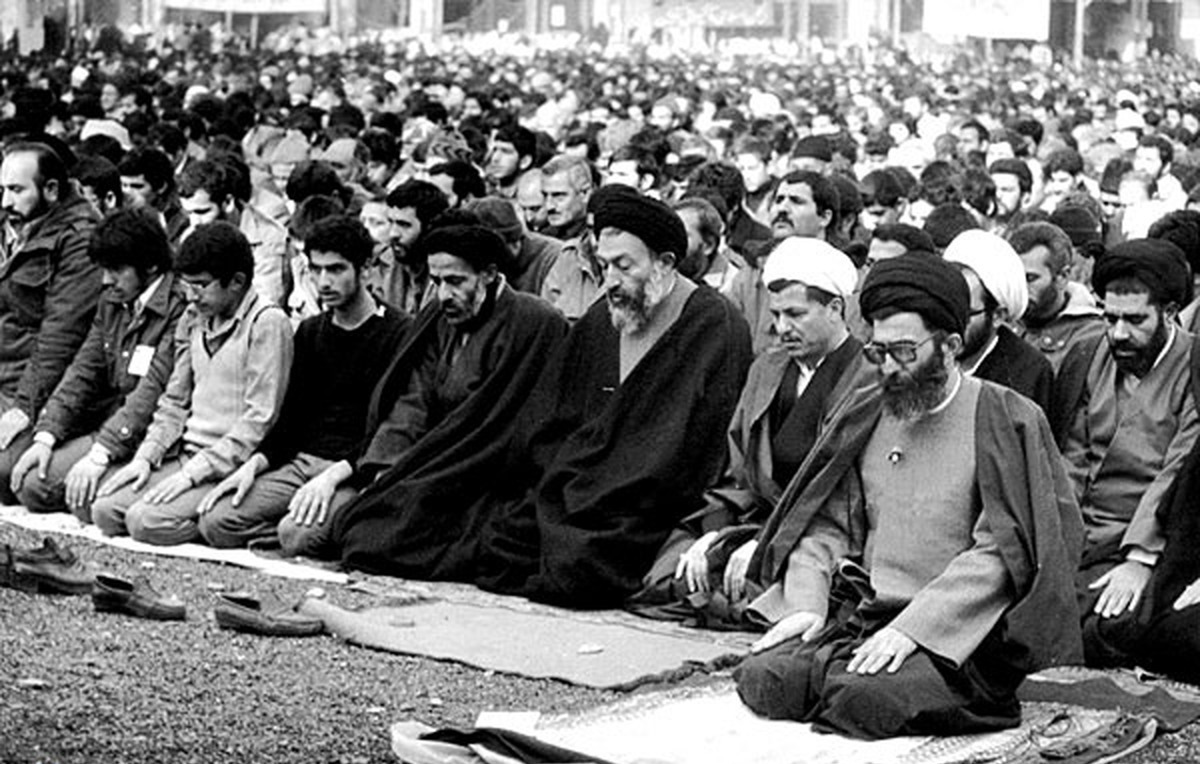
Ayatollah Khamenei Friday prayer with the presence of Ayatollah Beheshti and Akbar Hashemi

== Opinions ==
Beheshti had an important role in writing the constitution of Iran, particularly the economic section. He believed in cooperative companies (Ta'avoni) in the field of economy and partnership and co-operation in lieu of competition in economic affairs. According to him, in Ta'avoni companies there is no middle man between producer and consumer. He also asserts that in such entities, legal rights belong to members rather than stock holders. He claims the foundation of Iran's Constitution to be Islamic, and that Iran's revolutionary Islamic system is at the same time a people-oriented system according to the volition of the Iranian people. This system is designed for the betterment and evolution of humankind. According to Beheshti, one of the most important pillars of political thought is that human could walk in right path along with faith to truth.

=== Philosophy of jurisprudence ===
According to Beheshti, the origin of property and possession in Islam is working.

=== Epistemology ===
Beheshti raised some epistemological questions in Knowledge from the Quran's View Point. He believed that knowledge no definition, and that no definition can be found. Beheshti believed there are only four sources of knowledge: perception, introspection, reason and revelation (or Vahy). He coupled an empiric attitude with foundationalism in his structure of knowledge.

=== Anthropology ===
Beheshti, opposed to modernism, believed that there is a strict relationship between individual and collective aspects of human being. According to him, although the history of humans shows that they are always tend to falsehood (or Batil), the Quran says there is a strong link between humanity and truth. Beheshti also emphasized on the theory of Fitarat (innateness or primary nature) in anthropology. Beheshti also believed the human soul had to be considered in the whole rather than in part. According to the theory of primary nature, one of the characters of human soul is volition and choosing. At the same time humans undertake responsibility for their actions. Humans have two important qualities: freedom of choice and responsibility. In other words, Beheshti believes Islam has a realist slant in respect to humans as it considers humans as a mix of freedom of choice and responsibility. Whilst humans are given choice, faith has an important role in this way and could help humans in making decision.

=== Political positions ===
Beheshti supported a state which protects its citizens. He combined conservatism with his own Brand of "Islamic Marxism". However, he is also considered a progressive cleric, distinguishing himself from right-wing conservatives.

=== Museum ===
Seyyed Mohammad Beheshti's house in the Gholhak neighborhood was turned into a museum in July 1992. The house consists of two parts and the artists tried to show both parts; A part of Beheshti's social life is like the meeting room, where many things happened before and after the Islamic Revolution, and he was arrested at least twice by SAVAK agents; There are also several meetings between religious modernists, the Revolutionary Council, the Council of Fighting Clergy that have been formed in this place, which are related to his social life in this house. The other part is the family part of the building, which evokes memories of his behavior with the family.

== See also ==
- Mohammad-Ali Rajai
- Mohammad-Javad Bahonar
- Mohammad Mofatteh

Party political offices
Preceded by Office established	Secretary-General of the Islamic Republican Party; 1979–1981	Succeeded by Mohammad-Javad Bahonar
Legal offices
Unknown	Head of Judiciary System of Iran; 1980–1981	Succeeded by Abdul-Karim Mousavi Ardebili
