= Coalition of Islamic Parties =

- Founded: 1979
- Succeeded by: Grand Coalition
- Ideology: Islamism
- Religion: Islam
- Assembly for the Final Review of the Constitution: 58 / 73

The Great Islamic Coalition or the Coalition of Islamic Parties was an electoral alliance of organizations led by Islamic Republican Party, competing in 1979 Iranian Constitutional Convention election. It was the largest coalition in the elections, and used its influence on media, Islamic Revolution Committees and the mosques to oust their opponents, most importantly the Quintuple Coalition of radical Islamic groups.

== Parties in coalition ==
The main groups in the coalition were:

- Islamic Republican Party
- Mojahedin of the Islamic Revolution Organization
- Islamic Revolutionary Guard Corps
- Combatant Clergy Association
- Society of Seminary Teachers of Qom
- Fada'iyan-e Islam

The coalition also included smaller groups.

== See also ==
- Quintuple Coalition
- Septuple Coalition
- Grand National Alliance
