= Nation Party of Iran =

Small secular opposition party in Iran

Party of the Iranian Nation
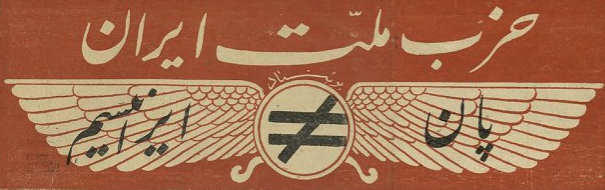
- Header of the party's official organ in 1952
- Secretary-General: Khosrow Seif
- Founder: Dariush Forouhar
- Founded: 24 October 1951; 74 years ago
- Split from: Pan-Iranist Party
- Headquarters: Tehran, Iran
- Ideology: Iranian nationalism; Pan-Iranism; Anti-capitalism; Anti-communism; Republicanism; Secularism (Iranian); Anti-clericalism
- Political position: Right-wing
- National affiliation: National Front (1951–1979)
- Parliament: 0 / 290

Party of the Iranian Nation (or Nation Party of Iran, Iran Nation Party; Persian: حزب ملت ایران, romanized: Ḥezb-e Mellat-e Irān) is a small opposition party in Iran advocating for the establishment of a secular democracy. Although the party is technically illegal, it still operates inside Iran.

Founded in 1951 by Dariush Forouhar, the party had a few hundred members, mostly high-school students, and was a member of National Front until the Iranian Revolution; however, it did not carry much weight in the leadership of the front. The party proposed rebuilding Iran by regaining its lost territories in Bahrain, Afghanistan and Caucasia. The party's platform ideologically consisted of the following elements: anti-capitalism; anti-communism; anti-monarchism; anti-Semitism; anti-Bahá'ísm; anti-clericalism.

Popular among high school students in Tehran in the 1950s, the party's membership never exceeded a few hundred people.

== Electoral history ==
Year	Election	Seats	Ref
1979	Constitutional Assembly	0 / 73(0%)	
1980	Parliament	0 / 290(0%)	
