= Movement of Militant Muslims =

Movement of Militant Muslims جنبش مسلمانان مبارز
- Leader: Habibollah Payman
- Founded: 1977; 48 years ago
- Split from: JAMA
- Preceded by: Movement of God-Worshipping Socialists
- Newspaper: Ommat
- Ideology: Islamic socialism Social democracy Anti-imperialism
- Religion: Islam
- Parliament: 0 / 290

The Movement of Militant Muslims (Persian: جنبش مسلمانان مبارز) is an Iranian Islamic socialist political group led by Habibollah Payman. The group had been revolutionary and is close to Council of Nationalist-Religious Activists of Iran.
