= Muslim People's Republic Party =

Muslim People's Republic Party حزب جمهوری خلق مسلمان ایران
- Leader: Mohammad Kazem Shariatmadari
- Founded: 25 February 1979
- Banned: January 1980
- Headquarters: Qom, Iran (symbolic); Azarbaijan Province, Iran
- Membership: 3,000,000 claimed
- Ideology: Clericalism; Islamic democracy Islamic liberalism Iranian nationalism Pluralism; Collective leadership Social conservatism
- Political position: Centre
- Religion: Islam

The Muslim People's Republic Party (MPRP) or Islamic People's Republican Party (IPRP; Persian: حزب جمهوری خلق مسلمان ایران, romanized: Ḥezb-e jomhuri-e ḵalq-e mosalmān-e Irān) was a short-lived party associated with Shia Islamic cleric Shariatmadari. It was founded in 1979 during the Iranian Revolution as a "moderate, more liberal counterweight" to the theocratic, Islamist Islamic Republican Party (IRP) of Ayatollah Ruhollah Khomeini, and disbanded in 1980.

== History ==
The party was founded around March 1979. by a "group of bazaar merchants, middle-class politicians, and clerics associated with Khomeini's chief rival in Qom", the Grand Ayatollah Mohammad Kazem Shariatmadari. In contrast to the Islamic Republican Party, the Muslim People's Republican Party emphasized "collective" religious leadership - as opposed to leadership by Khomeini - "criticized the unruly behavior" of the revolutionary committees and the "harsh judgment" of the revolutionary courts, was ready to cooperate with the secular parties, and demanded free access for all to the broadcast media." The MPRP "immediately came under attack from the" IRP and the MPRP's offices in "Karaj, Arak, Saveh, Ardabil, and Khalkhal were attacked."

In November 1979 the party and its clerical adviser, Shari'atmadari (who was not a member), became a rallying point of Iranians who opposed the proposed new theocratic constitution of the Islamic Republic, which was soon to be voted on in a national referendum. In return, the party and the cleric were attacked by the state-controlled media. Khomeini met with Shariatmadari on December 6 and delivered "what appears to have been an ultimatum" to him.

In early December riots broke out in Shariatmadari's Azeri home region. Members of the MPRP and Shariatmadari's followers in Tabriz took to the streets and seized the television station, using it to "broadcast demands and grievances." Tabriz being Iran's second or third largest city it appeared "for a moment ... that the opposition had found a powerful base from which to check the spreading power of the Islamic Republican Party" and Khomeini's power.

The regime responded with carrots and sticks. Revolutionary Guards retook the TV station, mediators were sent to Tabriz, a massive pro-Khomeini counter-demonstration was staged in Tabriz. At this crucial point, Shariatmadari "wavered" in his support for the movement, and the Tabriz movement "faltered." In early January 1980, Shariatmadari "formally disassociated" himself from the MPRP, and after a clash in Qom between his followers and those of Khomeini he was put under virtual house arrest and many of his aides (who had been active in the party) were arrested.

The Islamic Republican Party organized a massive campaign to demand the dissolution of the MPRP and that party obliged announcing it "was suspending activities." By January, the party was no longer active. Some months later, two members of the party were put to death in Tabriz, "for having organized antigovernment rallies."

In 2010, Asadollah Asadi was imprisoned on charges that he was a member of the party (also known as the Muslim People's Party). He was released on bail in 2016.

== See also ==
- Organizations of the Iranian Revolution
- List of largest political parties
