= 1979 Iranian Constitutional Assembly election =

- 3–4 August 1979

All 73 seats in the Assembly for the Final Review of the Constitution
- Registered: 20,857,391
- Turnout: 51.71%
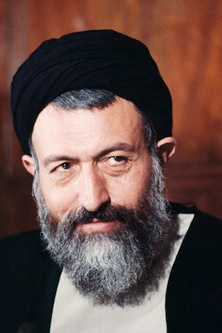

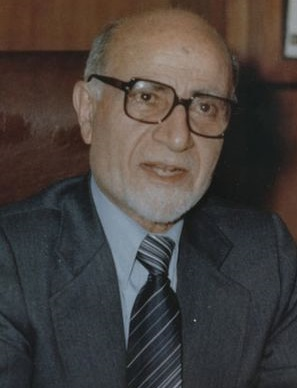

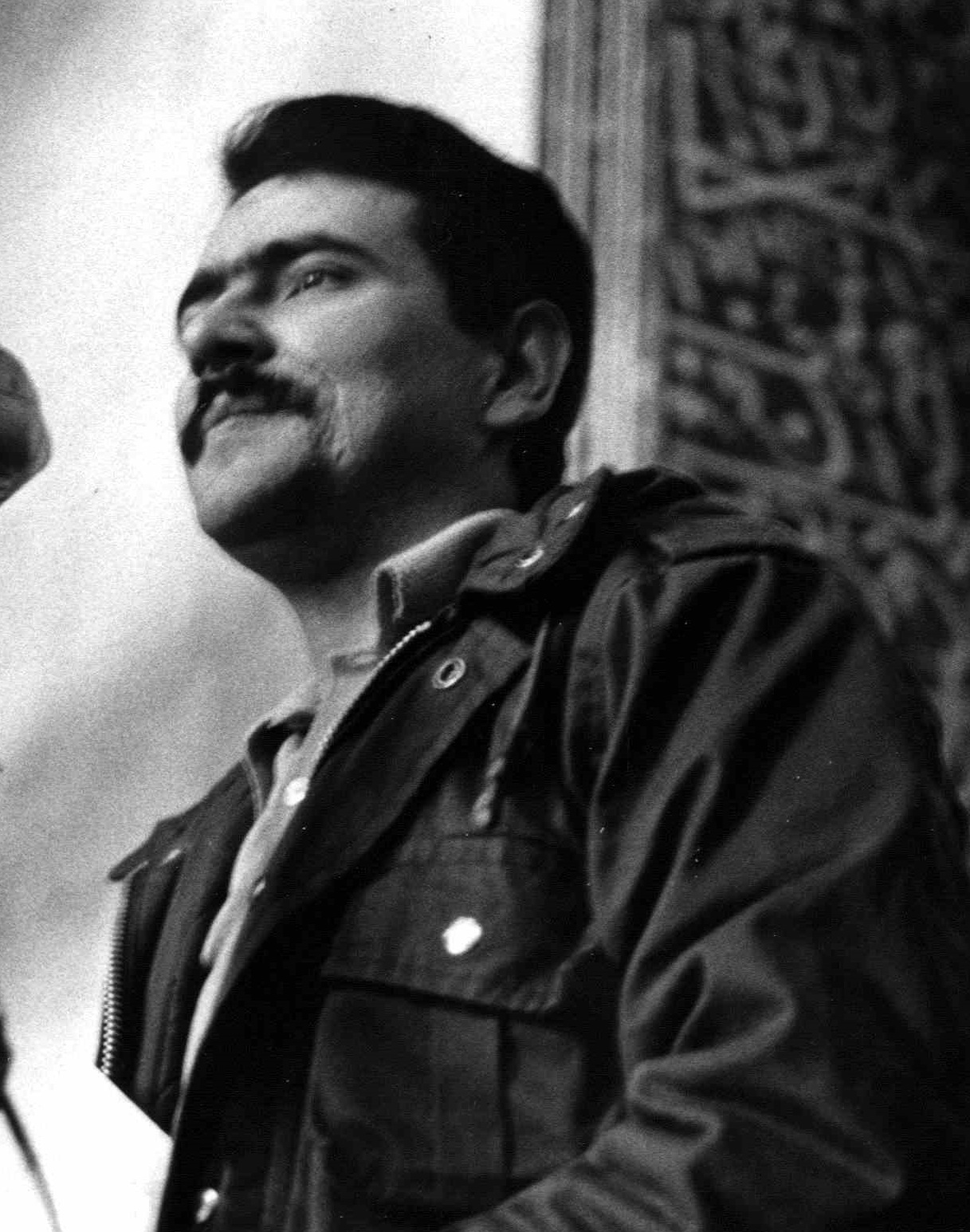

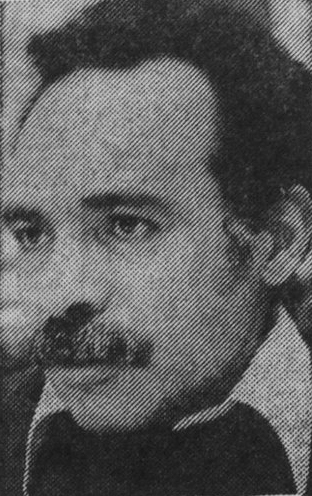

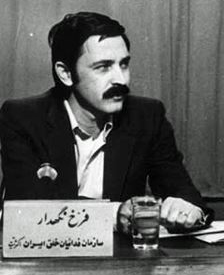

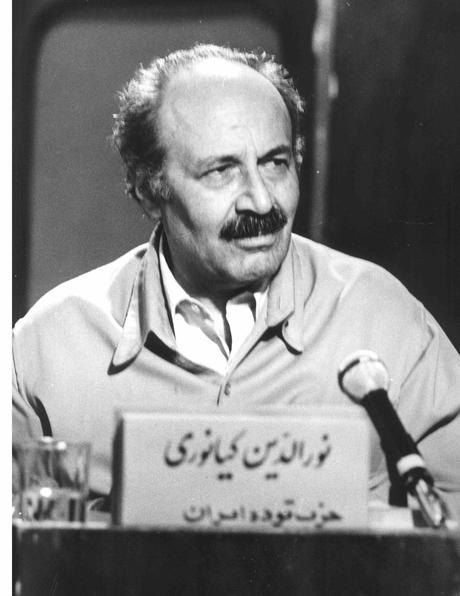

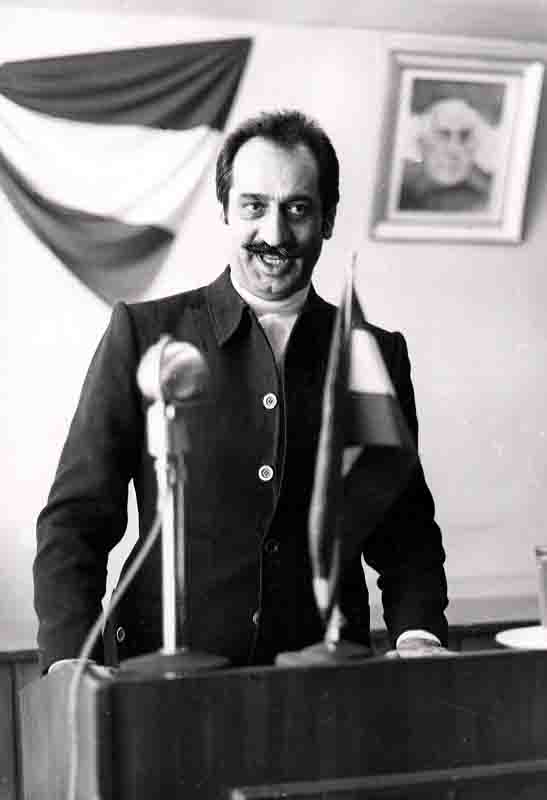
	First party	Second party	Third party
Leader	Mohammad Beheshti	Mehdi Bazargan	Mohammad Kazem Shariatmadari
Party	Islamic Republican Party	Freedom Movement of Iran	Muslim People's Republican Party
Leader's seat	Tehran	Did not stand	Did not stand
Seats won	55≈66	3≈8	3≈7
	Fourth party	Fifth party	Sixth party
Leader	Abdul Rahman Ghassemlou (Note: Credentials of Ghassemlou were rejected.)	Massoud Rajavi	Habibollah Peyman
Party	Democratic Party of Iranian Kurdistan	People's Mujahedin of Iran	Movement of Militant Muslims
Leader's seat	West Azerbaijan	Tehran (defeated)	Tehran (defeated)
Seats won	1	0	0
	Seventh party	Eighth party	Ninth party
Leader	Farrokh Negahdar	Noureddin Kianouri	Dariush Forouhar
Party	Organization of Iranian People's Fedai Guerrillas	Tudeh Party of Iran	Nation Party of Iran
Leader's seat	Did not stand	Tehran (defeated)	Did not stand
Seats won	0	0	0

Constitutional Convention elections were held in Iran on 3 and 4 August 1979. The result was a victory for the Islamic Republican Party. There were 10,784,932 votes cast in the elections, marking 51.71% turnout. Of all members elected, 68% were clerics.

The new constitution drawn up by the body was approved by the voters in a referendum in December.

== Campaign ==
During the elections, Islamic Republican Party had the upper hand when many clerical organizations and friday prayer imams endorsed IRP candidates and the National Television gave them extra time. Their campaign literature featured large pictures of Ayatollah Khomeini, who urged the voters to elect candidates with "Islamic qualifications", on the grounds that only such candidates are able to draft a genuine Islamic constitution.

Different leftist groups fielded candidates for the elections, including the Tudeh Party of Iran, the Organization of Iranian People's Fedai Guerrillas, the Organization of Struggle for the Emancipation of the Working Class and the Socialist Workers' Party of Iran. Among the nominees of the latter was the only soldier to run in the elections and two people in Khuzestan Province who campaigned while being jailed.

People's Mujahedin of Iran ran 26 candidates under its banner, including Massoud Rajavi in Tehran, Mousa Khiabani, Ahmad Hanifnejad and two others in Azerbaijan, eleven in central provinces, six in the northern provinces of Caspian and four in Khorasan.

=== Boycott ===
Several parties including National Front and National Democratic Front boycotted the elections in protest to the new press law, the result of which was to close many newspapers. They also protested the election method, in which the voters should write names of the candidates on the ballot slips. They regarded it questionable, considering the high rate of illiteracy at the time.

Pan-Iranist Party was also among the boycotting groups.

== Conduct ==
The elections were held nationwide, except for two constituencies in Kurdistan Province, where an insurgency was underway. The voting age was reduced to 16 before the elections to make more citizens eligible to vote.

== Results ==
The Islamic Republican Party and its Khomeinist allies won the election, securing an absolute majority of seats. Of all members elected, 58 were candidates supported by the IRP-led Great Islamic Coalition while the Freedom Movement of Iran and the Muslim People's Republican Party had endorsed 7 and 6 respectively (some were included in more than one list). The IRP was successful nationwide except for East Azerbaijan and West Azerbaijan, both MPRP strongholds, as well as Sistan and Baluchestan where Sunni candidates won. Secular candidates were defeated by a wide margin and most of the members elected were not only Islamist, but also were clerics, as stated by Ervand Abrahamian:

The winners included 15 ayatollahs, 40 hojjat al-Islams, and 11 IRP-sponsored intellectuals. The only successful candidates not affiliated with the IRP were: Taleqani, who obtained by far the most votes in Tehran – however, he died soon after the elections; another Tehran cleric close to both Taleqani and the Mojahedin; two provincial clerics sympathetic to Bazargan; three delegates from Azarbayjan sponsored by Shariatmadari's Islamic People’s Republican Party; one member of the Liberation Movement; one spokesman of the Kurdish Democratic Party, who was promptly barred from his seat; and the four representatives of the official religious minorities, the Armenians, Assyrians, Jews and Zoroastrians.

=== Summary ===
A summarised results of the parties that won seats at the election is as follows:

Party	Seats	%
Islamic Republican Party	55 / 73	75.3
Freedom Movement of Iran	6 / 73	8.2
Muslim People's Republican Party	4 / 73	5.5
Democratic Party of Iranian Kurdistan	1 / 73	1.4
Source: Nohlen et al. (2001)

↓
55	7	6	4	1
IRP	Others	FMI	MPRP	KDPI
