= Assembly for the Final Review of the Constitution =

1979 constituent assembly in Iran

Type
- Type: Constituent assembly of Iran

History
- Founded: 18 August 1979
- Disbanded: 15 November 1979

Leadership
- Speaker: Hussein-Ali Montazeri
- Deputy Speaker: Mohammad Beheshti
- Secretary: Hassan Ayat
- Clerks: Hassan Azodi; Mahmoud Rouhani

Structure
- Seats: 73
- Political groups: Majority (55 to 58 seats): Islamic Republican Party; Combatant Clergy Association; Society of Seminary Teachers of Qom; Opposition (10 to 14 seats): Freedom Movement of Iran; Muslim People's Republic Party; Radical Movement of Iran; Muslim Union Party; Vacant (1 seat)

Elections
- Voting system: Multi-seat districts: Plurality-at-large voting Single-seat districts: First-past-the-post voting
- First election: 3–4 August 1979

Meeting place
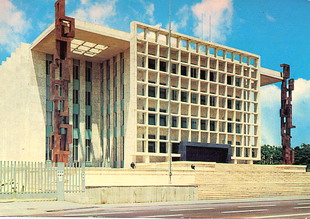
- Former Senate Building, Tehran, Iran

Constitution
- Constitution of the Islamic Republic of Iran

The Assembly for the Final Review of the Constitution (AFRC; Persian: مجلس بررسی نهایی قانون اساسی), also known as the Assembly of Experts for Constitution (Persian: مجلس خبرگان قانون اساسی), was a constituent assembly in Iran that was convened in 1979 to condense and ratify the draft prepared beforehand for the Constitution of the Islamic Republic of Iran.

It was mandated by the Council of the Islamic Revolution after the March 1979 referendum for regime change, and composed of 73 seats including four reserved for ethnoreligious minorities and the rest representing provincial constituencies on a basis of population. The elections to the assembly were held by the Interim Government of Iran in August 1979, which resulted in a landslide victory for the Islamist disciples of Ruhollah Khomeini who successfully added his theory –the Guardianship of the Islamic Jurist– to the constitution despite opposition by the minority.

It convened on 18 August 1979 and completed its deliberations rewriting the constitution on 15 November 1979. Subsequently, the constitution was approved in a referendum in December 1979.

== History ==
Prior to its election, a "Revolutionary council" had unveiled a draft constitution on June 18 which was written by Hasan Habibi. Aside from substituting a strong president, on the Gaullist model, for the monarchy, the constitution did not differ markedly from Iran's 1906 constitution and did not give the clerics an important role in the new state structure. Ayatollah Khomeini was prepared to submit this draft, virtually unmodified, to a national referendum or, barring that, to an appointed council of forty representatives who could advise on, but not revise, the document. Ironically, as it turned out, it was the leftist who most vehemently rejected this procedure and demanded that the constitution be submitted for full-scale review by a constituent assembly. Ayatollah Shariatmadari supported these demands.

== Members ==
Members by academic degree

Ph.D.	10
Master's	6
Bachelor's	7
Associate	1
Diploma	3
None	44

Total: 71

Source: Official Gazette of the AFRC (PDF), vol. 4, p. 409

According to Shaul Bakhash, the seventy-three-member Assembly of Experts was made up of 55 clerics, 50 of whom were candidates of the Islamic Republic Party (IRP). About a dozen members were independents or represented other parties and voted against the controversial articles of the constitution.

According to Sepehr Zabir, pro-IRP faction were 50% while 10% were better-known clerics such as Mahmoud Taleghani who were closer secular groupings. 20% were non-clerics embracing theocracy and the remaining 20% were followers of Abolhassan Banisadr and Mehdi Bazargan. Organizations such as the National Front, People's Fedai Guerrillas and People's Mujahedin of Iran were totally absent. A seat of Abdul Rahman Ghassemlou of Democratic Party of Iranian Kurdistan remained vacant after his credential was rejected.

The controversial articles in question were ones that revamped the draft constitution to include principles of Guardianship of the Islamic Jurists (velayat-e faqih) and establish the basis for a state dominated by the Shia clergy. The article was passed with 53 votes in favor, while 8 cast votes against and 5 abstained.

Members of the opposition bloc were reportedly the following:

Members by seminary education

Ijtihad	41
Kharij (advanced)	12
Sath (intermediate)	3
Moqadamat (introductory)	2

Total: 58

Source: Official Gazette of the AFRC (PDF), vol. 4, p. 408

- Abolhassan Banisadr
- Mahmoud Taleghani
- Ezzatollah Sahabi
- Ali Golzadeh Ghafouri
- Nasser Makarem Shirazi
- Ahmad Nourbakhsh
- Rahmatollah Moghaddam Maraghei
- Hamidollah Mir-Moradzehi
- Mohammad-Javad Hojjati Kermani

Representatives of ethnoreligious minorities are also likely to have voted with the opposition. They were:

- Hrair Khalatian (Armenian)
- Sergen Bait Ushana (Assyrian)
- Aziz Daneshrad (Jewish)
- Rostam Shahzadi (Zoroastrian)

=== Presiding officers ===
Hossein-Ali Montazeri was elected as the speaker, instead of Mahmoud Taleghani who was considered the prospect for the position. Other seats also went to supporters of the Guardianship of the Islamic Jurist, including Mohammad Beheshti who received the most votes for the deputy speaker, and Hassan Ayat who became the secretary.

The presiding officers of the assembly were as follows:

Position	Officeholder	Affiliation	Votes
Speaker	Hossein-Ali Montazeri	Society of Seminary Teachers	40 / 73
Deputy Speaker	Mohammad Beheshti	Islamic Republican Party	40 / 73
Secretary	Hassan Ayat	Islamic Republican Party	24 / 73
Clerks	Hassan Azodi	Islamic Republican Party	38 / 73
Clerks	Mahmoud Rouhani	Islamic Republican Party	37 / 73
Source: Official Gazette of the AFRC (PDF), vol. 1, pp. 19–21

=== Apportionment ===
Members by age group
Source: Official Gazette of the AFRC (PDF), vol. 4, p. 406

According to the enactment of the Council of the Islamic Revolution, the assembly had 69 seats which were apportioned among the 24 provinces by population. While any province was entitled to at least one representative, however small its population, each 500,000 residents were considered represented by one seat. 4 additional seats were reserved for religious minorities, including two for Christians (one allocated to Armenians and the other to Assyrians), and one for each of the Jewish and the Zoroastrian communities.

The number of seats dedicated to each province and the population which it was based on, were as follows:

#	Province	Population	Seat(s)
1	Tehran	5,297,732	10
2	Khorasan	3,266,650	7
3	East Azerbaijan	3,194,543	6
4	Mazandaran	2,384,226	5
5	Isfahan	2,178,678	4
6	Khuzestan	2,176,612	4
7	Fars	2,020,947	4
8	Gilan	1,577,800	3
9	West Azerbaijan	1,404,875	3
10	Zanjan	1,114,748	2
11	Kerman	1,088,045	2
12	Markazi	1,086,592	2
13	Hamedan	1,086,512	2
14	Kermanshahan	1,016,169	2
15	Lorestan	924,848	2
16	Kordestan	781,889	2
17	Sistan & Baluchestan	659,297	2
18	Hormozgan	643,149	1
19	Chaharmahal & Bakhtiari	394,300	1
20	Yazd	356,218	1
21	Bushehr	345,427	1
22	Semnan	283,346	1
23	Kohgiluyeh & Boyer-Ahmad	244,750	1
24	Ilam	244,222	1
Source: Majlis Research Center

== Goal ==
The assembly's work was part of a highly contentious time during the Iranian revolution that saw the breakup of the original alliance of secular, radical, religious, and theocratic groups that all united to overthrow the Shah. It was to the Assembly that Khomeini proclaimed "the velayat-e faqih is not something created by the Assembly of Experts. It is something that God has ordained," which clashed with comments such as, "our intention is not that religious leaders should themselves administer the state," made before the victory of the revolution.

The Assembly of Experts for Constitution is not to be confused with the later Assembly of Experts of the Leadership, which is a body created by the Constitution of Islamic Republic of Iran to elect and supervise Iran's Supreme Leader.
