= Islamic Republican Party =

Ruling party of Iran (1979–1987)

Islamic Republican Party حزب جمهوری اسلامی
- Historic leader: Ruhollah Khomeini
- Founders: Ali Khamenei; Mohammad Beheshti... and others: Mohammad Javad Bahonar; Akbar Hashemi Rafsanjani; Abdolkarim Mousavi-Ardabili
- Founded: 17 February 1979
- Dissolved: 1 June 1987
- Preceded by: Rastakhiz Party
- Headquarters: Tehran
- Newspaper: Jomhouri-e Eslami
- Paramilitary wing: Revolutionary Guards
- Trade union: Workers' House
- Membership: 2.5 million (1979 est.)
- Ideology: Khomeinism: Shia Islamism; Theocracy; Populism; Political Islam; Clericalism; Anti-imperialism; Anti-Marxism; Factions: Planned economy; Free market economy; Radicalism; Pragmatism
- Political position: Big tent
- Religion: Shia Islam
- Electoral alliance: Islamic Coalition (1979); Grand Coalition (1980)
- Slogan: "One nation, one religion, one order, one leader"

The Islamic Republican Party (IRP; Persian: حزب جمهوری اسلامی, romanized: Ḥezb-e Jomhūrī-ye Eslāmī, also translated Islamic Republic Party) was the sole ruling party of Iran from 1980 to 1987. It succeeded the Rastakhiz Party, the former ruling party during the Pahlavi era. It was formed to assist the Iranian Revolution and Ruhollah Khomeini in their goal to establish theocracy in Iran. It was disbanded in 1987 due to internal conflicts.

== Founders and characteristics ==
The party was formed just two weeks following the revolution upon the request of Ayatollah Khomeini. Five cofounders of the party were Mohammad Javad Bahonar, Mohammad Beheshti, Akbar Hashemi Rafsanjani, Ali Khamenei, and Abdolkarim Mousavi-Ardabili. Early members of the central committee of the party, in addition to founding members, were Hassan Ayat, Asadollah Badamchiyan, Abdullah Jasbi, Mir Hossein Mousavi, Habibollah Askar Oladi, Sayyed Mahmoud Kashani, Mahdi Araghi, and Ali Derakhshan. The party had three general secretaries: Beheshti, Bahonar and Khamenei.

The party has been said to be distinguished by "its strong clerical component, its loyalty to Khomeini, its strong animosity to the liberal political movements, and its tendency to support the revolutionary organizations", such as the Komiteh. Policies it supported included the state takeover of large capital enterprises, the establishment of an Islamic cultural and university system, and programs to assist the poor. These revolutionary ayatollahs originally used the party to form a monopoly over the post-revolutionary theocratic Iranian state. In its struggle with civilian opponents, the party made use of its ties to the Revolutionary Guards and Hezbollah.

=== Secretaries-general ===
Name	Tenure	Ref
Mohammad Beheshti	1979–1981	
Mohammad Javad Bahonar	1981	
Ali Khamenei	1981–1987	

== Causes of its dissolution ==
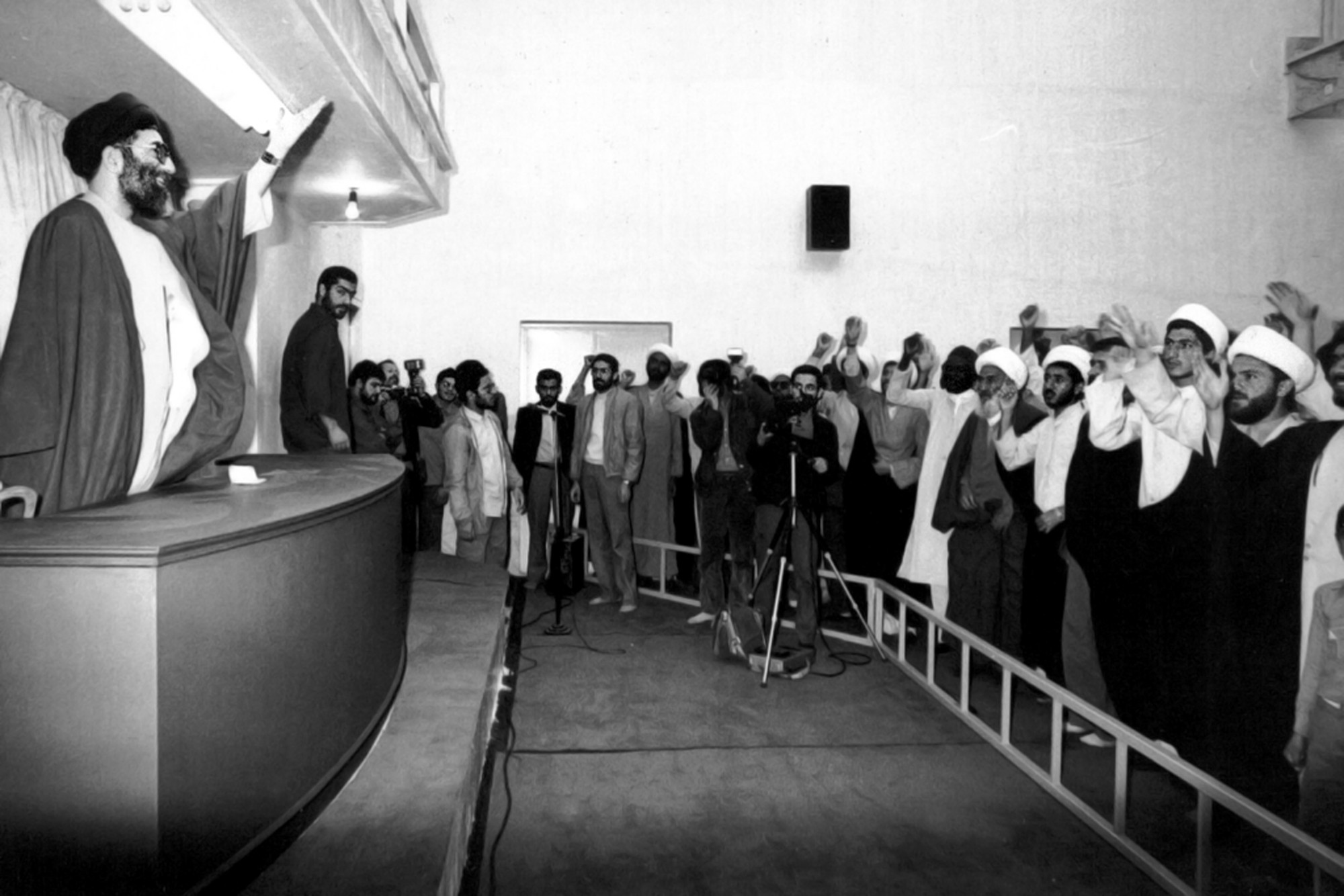
Ali Khamenei at the party's office in Qom, 1983

In the late 1980s, factionalism in the IRP intensified, the major issues being the Iran-Iraq War, whether to open up to foreign countries or remain isolated, and economic policies. Because all rival parties had been banned, the party "did almost nothing and had little incentive to." According to Ahmad Mneisi,

"While unanimous on the idea of a theological state and united under the umbrella of one party, the Islamic Republican Party (IRP), [the religious right] differed on a number of issues, such as the extent to which religion is to take hold of political life (the Velayat-e Faqih debate).

Daniel Brumberg argued that the IRP was dissolved to weaken popular Prime Minister Mir-Hossein Mousavi, as the party had become a stronghold of radical activism backing him in his dispute with President Ali Khamenei. Another report states that it was dissolved in May 1987 due to internal conflicts, and the party was disbanded upon joint proposal of Rafsanjani and Khamenei on 2 May 1987 when their proposal was endorsed by Khomeini.

== 1983 congress ==
The party held its first congress in May 1983 and the members elected the 30-members central council as follows:

#	Member (faction)	Votes
1	Akbar Hashemi Rafsanjani (R)	647
2	Ali Khamenei (R)	646
3	Mohammad Mehdi Rabbani Amlashi (R)	637
4	Mohammad Ali Movahedi Kermani (R)	634
5	Ali Akbar Velayati (R)	624
6	Abbas Vaez Tabasi (R)	623
7	Ali Akbar Nategh Nouri (R)	612
8	Ali Akbar Parvaresh (R)	589
9	Abbas Sheibani (R)	579
10	Mohamma Reza Beheshti (L)	578
11	Ghorbanali Dorri-Najafabadi (R)	574
12	Masih Mohajeri (L)	570
13	Hassan Ghafourifard (R)	550
14	Mir-Hossein Mousavi (L)	554
15	Habibollah Asgaroladi (R)	542

#	Member (faction)	Votes
16	Mohsen Doagou Feizabaadi (R)	500
17	Abolghasem Sarhaddizadeh (L)	499
18	Gholamhossein Sharifkhani	460
19	Mohammad Reza Bahonar (R)	453
20	Asadollah Lajevardi (R)	430
21	Asadollah Badamchian (R)	428
22	Javad Mansouri (L)	414
23	Reza Zavare'i (R)	410
24	Abdollah Jassbi (R)	375
25	Morteza Nabavi (R)	372
26	Saeed Amani (R)	310
27	Mohieddin Fazel Harandi (R)	276
28	Mostafa Mir-Salim (R)	260
29	Mohammad-Hossein Asgharnia	231
30	Javad Eje'i (L)	223

== Allied organizations ==
The following organizations formed an alliance with the party:

- Mojahedin of the Islamic Revolution Organization
- Islamic Coalition Party
- Combatant Clergy Association
- Worker House

== Electoral history ==
=== Deputy supreme leadership elections ===
Election	Main candidate	Votes	%	Result
1985	Hussein-Ali Montazeri	—		1st

=== Presidential elections ===
Election	Main candidate	Votes	%	Result
1980	Hassan Habibi	674,859	3.35	3rd
1981, July	Mohammad-Ali Rajai	12,779,050	87.69	1st
1981, October	Ali Khamenei	16,007,072	95.01	1st
1985	Ali Khamenei	12,203,870	87.90	1st

=== Parliamentary elections ===
Election	Party leader	Seats	+/–	Position
1980	Mohammad Beheshti	85 / 270	—N/a	1st
1984	Ali Khamenei	130 / 270	▲45	1st

== See also ==
- List of largest political parties

Ruling party of Iran
Vacant Title last held by Resurgence Party	Islamic Republican Party; 1981–1987	Vacant
