= 1902 in Iran =

- Decades
- See also: Other events of 1902; Years in Iran

The following lists events that happened during 1902 in Qajar era.

== Incumbents ==
- Monarch: Mozaffar ad-Din Shah Qajar

== Births ==
- April 15 – Abolhasan Saba, Iranian musician.
- September 5 – Taqi Arani, Iranian publisher.
- September 24 – Ruhollah Khomeini, Supreme Leader of Iran from 1979 to 1989.
- October 11 – ʻAbdu'l-Hamíd Ishráq-Khávari, Iranian Bahá'í scholar.
- December 25 – Gegham Saryan, Armenian poet and translator.
- ? – Abdolsamad Kambakhsh, Iranian politician.
- ? – Abdul Hosein Amini, Iranian Muslim scholar.
- ? – Ahmad Aram, Iranian writer, translator and teacher.
- ? – Allameh Abul Hasan Sharani, Iranian translator.
- ? – Ata'ollah Ashrafi Esfahani, religious leader from Iran.
- ? – Fatemeh Sayyah, Iranian essayist.
- ? – Hossein Fallah Noshirvani, Iranian businessperson.
- ? – Hossein Qollar-Aqasi, Iranian painter.
- ? – Mkrtich Khan Davidkhanian, Iranian general.
- ? – Mohammad Ali Keshavarz Sadr, Iranian politician.
- ? – Mohammad Javad Ansari Hamedani, Iranian religious scholar.
- ? – Mohammad-Ali Emam-Shooshtari, Muslim scholar of Islam.
- ? – Noor-ol-Hoda Mangeneh, Iranian writer.
- ? – Reza Zanjani, Iranian cleric and politician.
- ? – Sadegh Hedayat, Iranian writer.
- ? – Maurice Moynihan, Irish civil servant.

== Deaths ==
- December 20 – Kitabgi, Persian general.
- ? – Ali Khan Vali, Iranian photographer.
- ? – Wafayi, Kurdish poet.
