= 1904 in Iran =

- Decades
- See also: Other events of 1904; Years in Iran

The following lists events that happened during 1904 in Qajar era.

== Incumbents ==
- Monarch: Mozaffar ad-Din Shah Qajar

== Births ==
- February 12 – Mostafa Salimi, Iranian footballer.
- July 12 – Badiozzaman Forouzanfar, Iranian scholar of Persian literature and culture.
- July 14 – Asadollah Sanii, Iranian politician.
- ? – Arsalan Khalatbari, Iranian lawyer and politician.
- ? – Bozorg Alavi, writer, novelist and activist.
- ? – Jahanshah Saleh, Iranian physician, politician and writer.
- ? – Milton Malek-Yonan, Assyrian businessman.
- ? – Mirza Javad Agha Tehrani, Iranian cleric.
- ? – Nader Batmanghelidj, Iranian politician.
- ? – Sadegh Amirazizi, Iranian army general and politician.
- ? – Turan Amirsoleimani, Iranian noble.
- ? – Ahmad Aram, Iranian writer, translator and teacher.

== Deaths ==
- ? – Mirza Mahmud Khan Hakim ol-Molk, Iranian politician and physician.
