= List of mayors of Tehran =

Mayor of Tehran
- شهرداران تهران
- Seal of Tehran

- Flag of Tehran

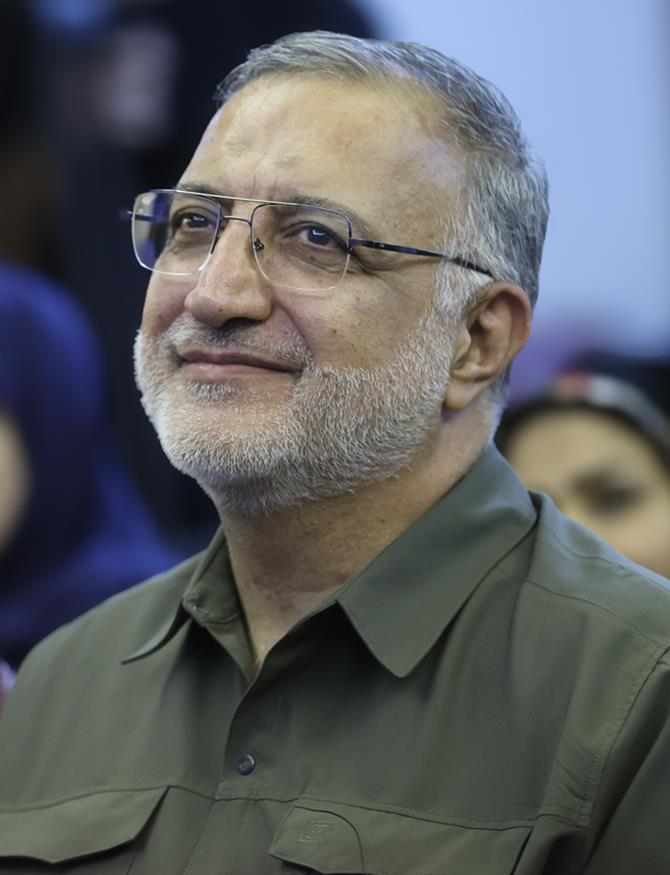
- Incumbent; Alireza Zakani since 2 September 2021
- Residence: City Park, Tehran
- Seat: Tehran
- Appointer: City Council
- Term length: 4 years
- Inaugural holder: Khalil Khan Saghafi
- Formation: 1908; 118 years ago
- Website: Official website

The mayor of Tehran is an elected politician who, along with the City Council of 21 members, is accountable for the strategic government of Tehran. Since 2 September 2021, Alireza Zakani is the mayor of Tehran. Previously, the position was held by Pirouz Hanachi, who held office for three years.

== List ==
=== Pre-1979 ===
==== Mayors appointed by Interior Minister ====
| Name | Image | Term start | Term end | Political Party |
|---|---|---|---|---|
| Khalil-Khan Saghafi Alam od-Dowleh | | 1908 | 1910 | |
| Mirza Abbaskhan Mohandes Bashi | | 1910 | 1913 | |
| Ebrahim-Khan Yomn os-saltaneh Monaghah | | 1914 | 1921 | |
| Kasbar Ipegian | | 1921 | 1923 | |
| Karim Buzarjomehri | | 1923 | 1934 | |
| Gholi Hooshmand | | 1934 | 1938 | |
| Ghasem Soor-Esrafil | | 1938 | 1940 | |
| Ali Asghar Foruzan | | 1940 | 1941 | |
| Mostafa Gholi Ram | | 1941 | 1941 | |
| Mohammad Sajjadi | | 1941 | 1942 | |
| Mehdi Emadolsaltaneh | | 1942 | 1943 | |
| Fazlollah Bahrami | | 1942 | 1943 | |
| Abbasgholi Golshaeeyan | | 1943 | 1944 | |
| Gholam-Hossein Ebtehaj | | 1944 | 1945 | |
| Mahmood Nariman | | 1945 | 1945 | |
| Mehdi Mashayekhi | | 1945 | 1947 | |
| Mohammad Khalatbari | | 1947 | 1947 | |
| Hesamedin Dolatabadi | | 1947 | 1949 | |
| Mohammad Mehran | | 1949 | 1950 | |
| Mehdi Namdar | | 1950 | 1951 | |
| Arsalan Khalatbari | | 1951 | 1951 | |
| Mohammad Mehran | | 1951 | 1952 | |
| Nosratollah Amini | | 1952 | 1953 | |
| Mohsen Nasr | | 1953 | 1953 | |
| Mohammad-Ali Saffari | | 1954 | 1954 | |
| Gholam-Hossein Ebtehaj | | 1954 | 1955 | |
| Nosratollah Montasser | | 1955 | 1956 | |
| Mahmoud Davaloo | | 1956 | 1957 | |
| Mousa Maham | | 1957 | 1959 | |
| Nasser Zolfaghari | | 1959 | 1960 | |
| Fathollah Forood | | 1960 | 1961 | |
| Mohsen Nasr | | 1961 | 1962 | |
| Ahmad Nafisi | | 1962 | 1963 | |
| Ali Akbar Tavana | | 1963 | 1963 | |
| Ziaeddin Shademan | | 1963 | 1965 | |
| Mohandes Taghi Sarlak | | 1965 | 1967 | |
| Mohammad-Ali Saffari | | 1967 | 1967 | |
| Manouchehr Pirooz | | 1967 | 1968 | |

==== Mayors elected by City Association ====
| No. | Portrait | Name | Term in office | | Affiliation | Appointer |
|---|---|---|---|---|---|---|
| 1 | | Javad Shahrestani | 3 November 1968 | 1 October 1969 | New Iran Party | 1 |
| 2 | | Gholamreza Nikpey | 1 October 1969 | 23 August 1977 | New Iran Party (1969–1975)Resurgence Party (1975–1978) | 1; 2; 3; 4; 5 |
| (1) | | Javad Shahrestani | 23 August 1977 | 11 February 1979 | Resurgence Party | 6 |

=== Post-1979 ===
==== Mayors appointed by Interior Minister ====
| No. | Portrait | Name | Term in office | | Affiliation | Appointer |
|---|---|---|---|---|---|---|
| 1 | | Mohammad Tavasoli | 26 February 1979 | 5 January 1981 | Freedom Movement | Mehdi Bazargan |
| Acting | | Reza Zavare'i | 5 January 1981 | 14 January 1981 | Islamic Coalition | Mohammad-Reza Mahdavi Kani |
| 2 | | Kamaleddin Nikravesh | 14 January 1981 | 7 September 1981 | Islamic Coalition | Mohammad-Reza Mahdavi Kani |
| 3 | | Gholam-Hossein Deljou | 7 September 1981 | 14 October 1982 | Islamic Coalition | Mohammad-Reza Mahdavi Kani |
| 4 | | Mohammad-Kazem Sufyan | 14 October 1982 | 24 August 1983 | Islamic Coalition | Ali Akbar Nategh-Nouri |
| Acting | | Hossein Bonakdar | 24 August 1983 | January 1984 | Islamic Coalition | Ali Akbar Nategh-Nouri |
| 5 | | Mohammad Nabi Habibi | January 1984 | December 1987 | Islamic Coalition | Ali Akbar Nategh-Nouri |
| Acting | | Morteza Tabatabaei | December 1987 | January 1990 | —N/a | Ali Akbar Mohtashamipour |
| 6 | | Gholamhossein Karbaschi | January 1990 | April 1998 | Executives of Construction (since 1996) | Abdollah Nouri |

==== Mayors elected by City Council ====
| No. | Portrait | Name | Term in office | | Affiliation | Term |
|---|---|---|---|---|---|---|
| 1 | | Morteza Alviri | 1 June 1999 | 19 February 2002 (Resigned 13 February) | Executives of Construction | 1st |
| Acting | | Mohammad Haghani | 19 February 2002 | 4 March 2002 | —N/a | 1st |
| 2 | | Mohammad-Hassan Malekmadani | 4 March 2002 (Designated 25 February) | 20 January 2003 | Executives of Construction | 1st |
| Acting | | Mohammad-Hossein Moghimi | 20 January 2003 | 3 May 2003 | Executives of Construction | —N/a |
| 3 | | Mahmoud Ahmadinejad | 20 May 2003 (Designated 3 May) | 28 June 2005 | Alliance of Builders | 2nd |
| Acting | | Ali Saeedlou | 28 June 2005 (Designated 26 June) | 4 September 2005 | Alliance of Builders | 2nd |
| 4 | | Mohammad Bagher Ghalibaf | 14 September 2005 (Designated 4 September) | 23 August 2017 | —N/a | 2nd |
| 4 | | Mohammad Bagher Ghalibaf | 14 September 2005 (Designated 4 September) | 23 August 2017 | Progress and Justice Population | 3rd |
| 4 | | Mohammad Bagher Ghalibaf | 14 September 2005 (Designated 4 September) | 23 August 2017 | Progress and Justice Population | 4th |
| Acting | | Mostafa Salimi | 27 August 2017 | | —N/a | 5th |
| 5 | | Mohammad-Ali Najafi | 27 August 2017 (Designated 10 August) | 10 April 2018 (Resigned 14 March) | Executives of Construction | 5th |
| Acting | | Samiollah Hosseini Makarem | 10 April 2018 | 16 May 2018 | —N/a | 5th |
| 6 | | Mohammad-Ali Afshani | 16 May 2018 (Designated 13 May) | 17 November 2018 | National Trust Party | 5th |
| Acting | | Pirouz Hanachi | 18 November 2018 (Designated 13 November) | 28 November 2018 | Union of People Party | 5th |
| 7 | | Pirouz Hanachi | 28 November 2018 | 8 August 2021 | Union of People Party | 5th |
| Acting | | Alireza Javid | 8 August 2021 | 2 September 2021 | —N/a | 6th |
| 8 | | Alireza Zakani | 2 September 2021 (Designated 8 August) | Incumbent | Society of Pathseekers of the Islamic Revolution | 6th |

== See also ==
- List of mayors of Shiraz
- List of mayors of Tabriz
- List of members of City Council of Tehran
- Timeline of Tehran
