= Kamaleddin Nikravesh =

- کمال‌الدین نیک‌روش
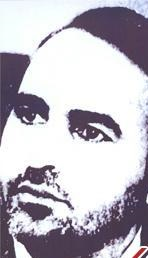

Minister of Interior
- In office 3 September 1981 – 15 December 1981
- Prime Minister: Mohammad-Javad Bahonar; Mohammad-Reza Mahdavi; Mir-Hossein Mousavi
- Preceded by: Mohammad-Reza Mahdavi Kani
- Succeeded by: Ali Akbar Nategh-Nouri

Mayor of Tehran
- In office 14 January 1981 – 7 September 1981
- Preceded by: Mohammad Tavasoli (Reza Zavare'i acting)
- Succeeded by: Gholam-Hossein Deljou

Personal details
- Born: 1944 (age 81–82) Tehran, Imperial State of Iran
- Party: Islamic Republican Party; Islamic Coalition Party
- Education: Tehran Polytechnic; Missouri State University

Kamaleddin Nikravesh (Persian: کمال‌الدین نیک‌روش; born 1944 in Tehran) is an Iranian politician who served as the Mayor of Tehran in 1979-1980 and the Minister of Interior in 1980 in the newly established Islamic Republic as part of the first government of Mir Hossein Mousavi.

== Biography ==
He completed his Bachelor's degree at the Tehran Polytechnic and his Master and Doctorate degrees at the Missouri State University. He served as Mayor of Tehran in 1979-1980 for 7 months He served as a member of the Board of Trustees of K. N. Toosi University of Technology as well as a member of the Board of Trustees of the University of Water and Electricity Industry. From 1979 to 1981 he served as president of Amirkabir University of Technology. He served also as Provincial Governor of the Kohgiluyeh and Boyer-Ahmad province.

In 2003, he was selected as the country's most outstanding figure in the field of electrical and electronic engineering.
