= 1997 Iranian presidential election =

- 23 May 1997
- Registered: 36,466,487
- Turnout: 79.92% (▲22.32 or 29.26pp)
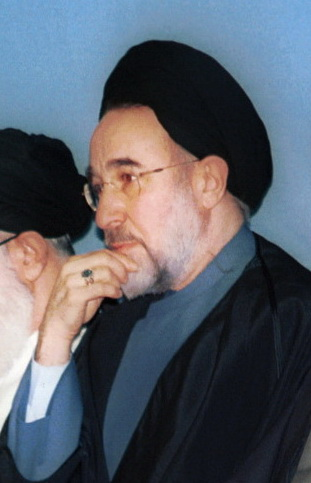

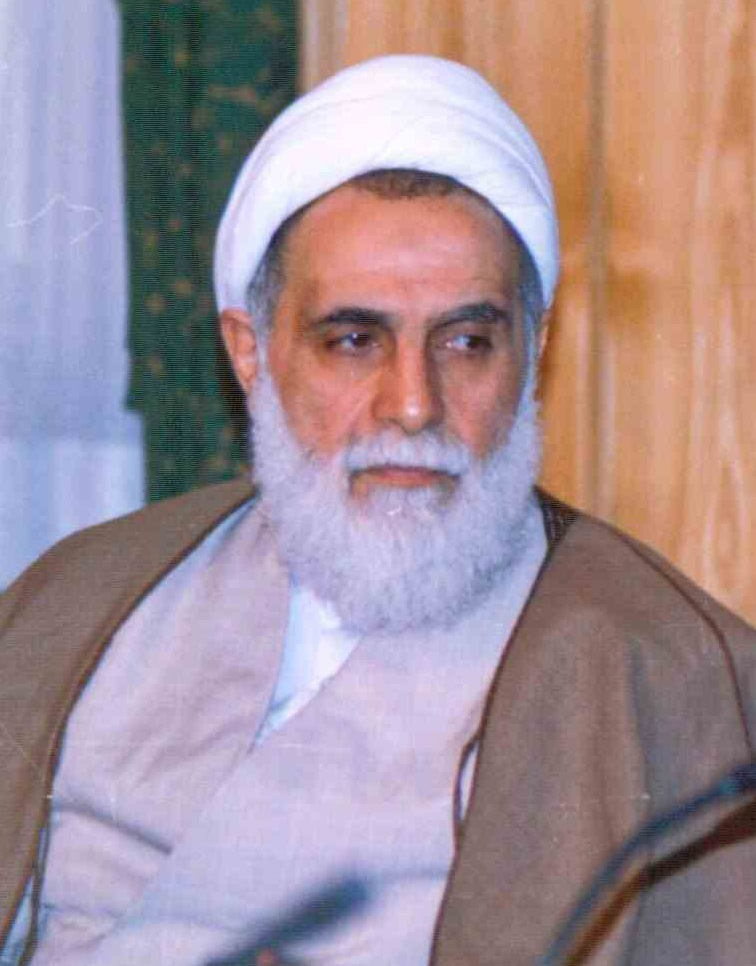
Nominee	Mohammad Khatami	Ali Akbar Nategh-Nouri
Party	ACC	CCA
Alliance	Reformists	Principlists
Popular vote	20,078,187	7,242,859
Percentage	69.07%	24.91%
President before election
Akbar Hashemi Rafsanjani
CCA
Elected President
Mohammad Khatami
ACC

Presidential elections were held in Iran on 23 May 1997, which resulted in an unpredicted win for the reformist candidate Mohammad Khatami. The election was notable not only for the lopsided majority of the winner – 70% – but for the high turnout. 80% of those eligible to vote did so, compared to 50% in the previous presidential election.

During the election, voting age was 15 and more than half of Iran's population was younger than 25.

== Candidates ==
The Council of Guardians blocked 234 candidates from running for the presidency because they lacked the religious and political qualifications. Only four candidates were permitted to run for office:

- Mohammad Khatami, former Minister of Culture and Islamic Guidance
- Mohammad Reyshahri, former Minister of Intelligence and National Security
- Reza Zavare'i, member of the Guardian Council
- Ali Akbar Nategh-Nouri, incumbent Speaker of the Parliament of Iran

=== Disqualified candidates ===
- Ebrahim Yazdi, Secretary-General of Freedom Movement of Iran
- Habibollah Payman, leader of the Movement of Militant Muslims
- Ezzatollah Sahabi, leading Nationalist-Religious figure
- Azam Taleghani, former member of the Parliament of Iran

=== Declined to run ===
- Mir-Hossein Mousavi, former Prime Minister

== Issues ==
The candidates were asked about their opinion on the fatwa against Salman Rushdie. Ali Akbar Nateq-Nouri said that any "a good Muslim" would carry out the fatwa. Mohammad Khatami avoided the issue. Mohammad Khatami's supporters called Nateq-Nouri the "Taliban" of Iran.

Khatami ran on a platform of political liberalization at home and détente abroad and expressed support for the easing Islamic regulations "from women's dress to whether TV satellite dishes should be allowed."

== Endorsements ==
Organization	Candidate
Combatant Clergy Association	Ali Akbar Nateq-Nouri
Islamic Coalition Society	Ali Akbar Nateq-Nouri
Society of Seminary Teachers of Qom	Ali Akbar Nateq-Nouri
Society of Devotees of the Islamic Revolution	Ali Akbar Nateq-Nouri
Association of Combatant Clerics	Mohammad Khatami
Executives of Construction Party	Mohammad Khatami
Coalition of Imam's Line groups	Mohammad Khatami
Mojahedin of the Islamic Revolution of Iran Organization	Mohammad Khatami
Hezbollah Assembly (parliamentary group)	Mohammad Khatami
Association for Defence of Revolution Values	Mohammad Reyshahri
Freedom Movement of Iran	Boycott
Democratic Party of Iranian Kurdistan	Boycott

=== Media ===
During the elections, neutrality of Islamic Republic of Iran Broadcasting (IRIB) became a subject of dispute, as the organization was accused of supporting Nateq-Nouri and promoting conservative agenda.

- Salam supported Khatami
- Hamshahri supported Khatami
- Resalat supported Nateq-Nouri
- Kayhan supported Nateq-Nouri

== Results ==
1997 Iranian presidential election
Party	Candidate	Nohen et al		ISSDP	
Party	Candidate	Votes	%	Votes	%
Association of Combatant Clerics	Mohammad Khatami	20,078,187	69.07	20,138,784	69.1
Combatant Clergy Association	Ali Akbar Nategh-Nouri	7,242,859	24.91	7,248,317	24.87
Independent	Reza Zavarei	771,460	2.65	772,707	2.65
Association for Defence of Revolution Values	Mohammad Reyshahri	742,598	2.55	744,205	2.65
Blank or invalid votes		240,996	0.93	241,732	0.83
Totals		29,067,100	100	29,145,745	100
Registered voters		33,784,000	86.04	36,466,487	79.92
