= Zolfaghari =

Zolfaghari or Zolfagari (Persian: ذوالفقاری) can be both a middle name and a surname. Notable people with the surname include:

- Ahmadreza Zolfaghari Daryani (1959–2025), Iranian nuclear scientist
- Ayoub Zolfagari (born 1959), Iranian footballer and manager
- Ebrahim Zolfaghari, Iranian military spokesperson
- Mohammad Hassan Zolfaghari (died 2013), Iranian basketball player and coach
- Nasser Zolfaghari, Iranian politician
