= Ali Akbar Aboutorabi Fard =

Iranian politician 1939–2000

Ali-Akbar Aboutorabi Fard

Supreme Leader in Azadegan (released war captives) Affairs Headquarters

Member of Parliament of Iran
- Constituency: Tehran (1992–1996); Tehran (1996–2000)

Personal details
- Born: 1939 Qazvin, Imperial State of Iran
- Died: 2 June, 2000 On way to Mashhad, Iran
- Cause of death: car crash
- Party: Association for Defence of Revolution Values (1996–1999)
- Education: Kharij Fiqh and Usul

Hojatoleslam Seyyed Ali Akbar Aboutorabi Fard (Persian: سید علی اکبر ابوترابی فرد; 1939 – 2 June 2000) was an Iranian revolutionary. During the Iran–Iraq War, he assisted in the organization of an Iranian militia but was captured by Iraqi forces and spent 10 years in Iraqi prisons. Upon his release, he became the Supreme Leader's representative to Azadegan Affairs Headquarters and Tehran's representative in the 4th and 5th terms of the Islamic Consultative Assembly.

== Early life and education ==
Hojatoleslam Seyyed Ali Akbar Aboutorabi Fard was born in 1939 in Qazvin. During his childhood, he saw all of Reza Shah's violence against religion and the seminaries and clerics of Islam. He also saw women of family stay at home following the Kashf-e hijab and found his ancestors on a fight path against the Pahlavi dynasty's irreligious plans.

He was a champion at a swimming event named Amjadiyeh in Tehran and was the top player in football and volleyball in high school. In 1957, after finishing high school, he insisted that he would go to Germany and continue his education there. He continued to study in seminaries, which would leave him poor and needy. But after a little hesitation in Qom, in 1958 he went to Mashhad to learn regional science; hence he could escape his uncle's insistence. However, he made a covenant with himself to never get financial assistance, even from his father. In Mashhad, he lived in a paltry room at Navvab School and was engaged in teaching and learning.

With the beginning of Ruhollah Khomeini's movement, he found Qom to be the center of struggle and returned there in 1963. He resided at the Hojjatie School to be engaged in Khomeini's companions activities.

== Marriage ==
In 1967, Aboutorabi came back to Iran and married at the age of 28. He then moved to Najaf with his wife.

== Before the Iranian Revolution ==
=== Devotees of Islam ===
He attended the ceremony for the Devotees of Islam and was a spectator at their gatherings when he was a teenager.

=== Uprising of 15 Khordad ===
Abutorabi also was beaten when police rushed to the Feyziyeh School in the 5 June 1963 (15 Khordad) demonstrations in Iran.

=== Migration to Najaf ===
Following the suppression of 1963 uprising and Khomeini's exile to Najaf, he moved to Najaf and attended classes of Khomeini and other clerics. To travel to Najaf, he went to Basra secretly through Khorramshahr's port and then traveled to Najaf.

=== Arrest ===
In 1970, Aboutorabi and his wife and children returned to Iran on the pretext of meeting family, with Khomeini's statement about Ayatollah Saeedi, who was killed in a SAVAK prison, embedded in his suitcase. Pahlavi regime's security forces, who were awaiting Khomeini's reaction about Ayatollah Saeedi's death, strongly controlled the Khosravi border crossing. They therefore arrested Aboutorabi when he was crossing the border, and took him to SAVAK station in Kermanshah when they found the statements. He was moved to Tehran one day later.

The cunning of Aboutorabi in dealing with SAVAK interrogators and normal response to questions, led to be not very long his prison term, though SAVAK officials were not convinced. Six months later, after much torture and harassment, Aboutorabi was released from prison.

=== After release ===
He tried to go to Najaf after his release, but he did not succeed. So he continued his political struggle in Iran and organized an armed struggle along with Seyyed Ali Andarzgo. They were repeatedly prosecuted by SAVAK, but they maintained a high level of secrecy to the extent that very little of these activities has been recorded. Aboutorabi's control operation was codenamed “Saghar” meaning goblet. With the spread of Islamic Revolution, SAVAK had no opportunity to arrest him.

During the Iranian Revolution, he was the commander of a group of people who seized and protected Sa'dabad Palace until it was delivered to the new authorities.

He, in collaboration with his brother Hojatoleslam Sayyed Mohammad Aboutorabi, played an important role in seizing the Qazvin Army garrison and the securing of weapons and war equipment. He had a close relationship with Mohammad-Ali Rajai, Mohammad Beheshti, and Ali Khamenei, and participated in the welcoming committee on the arrival of Khomeini in Iran.

== After Iranian Revolution ==
He formed and directed the Islamic Revolution Committee in Qazvin, his ancestral city, for organizing and to avoid anarchy. After a while following a popular vote he became a member of the City council and afterward undertook the presidency.

== The Iran–Iraq War ==
Soon after the Iranian Revolution, the Iran–Iraq War began. With start of the War, he accompanied Mostafa Chamran in Irregular Warfare Headquarters to organize the militia. He was going on difficult exploration mission himself. Liberation of “Dobb-e Hardan”, the adventurous and dangerous area, is one of his actions as a commander of a group of 100 fighters.

== Captivity ==
Eventually, on 17 December 1980, while returning from a reconnaissance mission, he was identified and captured by enemy forces, while his distance from friendly forces was 7 km.

Aboutorabi says about the early days of his captivity:"several times in jail they took me to the gallows and counted 1 and 2 for extracting confessions but each time they took me back. During the day, they took and brought me several time. Eventually at night they took me to Al-Amare school. An Iraqi general told those who were there: he has not right to sleep; we come back at midnight for extracting confessions, if he did not have enough information, we would nail his head. They came back at midnight and nailed my head, but it was not such a hit to die."

When Abutorabi was tortured in Iraq, it was rumoured in Iran that he had been martyred. Commemorations, lectures by prominent persons such as Mohammad-Ali Rajai, day-off and mourning in the city of Qazvin, participation of Hashem Rasuli and Yousef Saanei and Mohammad-Ali Nezamzade at his commemoration on behalf of Imam Khomeini to convey the message of condolence made clear the dimensions of character of Aboutorai. So Iraqi government recognized him as a prominent cleric.

Iraqi officials wanted to kill him, but an Iraqi general rejected since he was Sayyid and descendants of the Islamic prophet Muhammad. Iraqi officials repeatedly moved him from camp to another, including Camp Anbar, Camps Mosul 1, 2, 3 and 4, Camp Romadie, Camp Tikrit. Iranian captives loved Aboutorabi very much because of his way in leadership of captives. He was nicknamed “Seyyed-e Azadegan”, means sir of released war captives, because of his way to deal with captivity and encouraging the captives. Even Iraqi soldiers were impressed by his personality. For example, an Iraqi Major told Aboutorabi: "if Khomeini is like you, I will follow him."

== After captivity ==
Finally, after ten years of captivity, he returned to Iran to a popular welcome. He was appointed as the representative of the Supreme Leader in Azadegan (released war captives) Affairs Headquarters. In the fourth and fifth sessions of the Islamic Consultative Assembly, he was the second and third representative from Tehran.

== Death ==
Alongside his father Haj Seyyed Abbas Aboutorabi, he was killed in a car crash on 2 June 2000, when they were on their way to Mashhad for Imam Reza pilgrimage. They were buried in the Sahn Azadi (freedom courtyard) of the Imam Reza shrine on the anniversary of Imam Reza's martyrdom.

== Professors ==
- Ali Meshkini
- Hossein Vahid Khorasani
- Ruhollah Khomeini
- Alipanah Ishtihardi
- Mojtaba Qazvini Khorasani
