= Amir Houshang Keshavarz Sadr =

Iranian historian (1933–2013)

Amir Houshang Keshavarz Sadr (Persian: امیرهوشنگ کشاورز صدر; Tehran, 1933 – Florida, 13 February 2013) was a scholar of Iranian history and a civic-nationalist activist. He was an Honorary Fellow of the International Institute of Social History.

== Biography ==
Keshavarz Sadr was the son of Mohammad Ali Keshavarz Sadr, Prime Minister Mossadegh's deputy and a leader of the National Front (1960–1963). He obtained his BA in 1963 in Social Sciences and his MA in 1967 in Anthropology from the University of Tehran. He became active in politics at a young age as a member of the Tudeh Party, but after the August 28 Coup, along with Bijan Jazani and some other leftist students from the University of Tehran, he joined the national movement and enlisted at the Second National Front. It was at this point that he formed a close friendship with Abolhassan Banisadr, whom he would stay in touch with for the rest of his life. Through his continued political engagement he became a member of the National Front's Executive Council. Shapur Bakhtiar, the last prime minister before the overthrow of the Shah's regime, invited Keshavarz Sadr to be a minister in his cabinet, but failed to secure his consent.

In 1978, Keshavarz Sadr was appointed Director of the Centre for Indigenous Development Studies, the research arm and effective think-tank of the Alashtar Indigenous Regional Development Project.

In 1979, he was appointed Deputy Minister of Agriculture in Bazargan's Provisional Government and later became the President's Rural and Agricultural Advisor. In 1981 he was forced into exile. Since 1986, he was the President and Director of CIDR, the Centre for Iranian Documentation and Research.

He was a frequent visitor to Chicago and lived in the city for a year and a half beginning in fall 1990. His residence was a small room in the Dehkhoda Library (3224 West Bryn Mawr Avenue), which he had named, and which was an attempt by Iranians to provide a cultural centre for their community in Chicago.

He authored the book Mossadegh and the Future of Iran, about his friend Mossadegh. Ali Rahnema dedicated his book Behind the 1953 Coup in Iran: Thugs, Turncoats, Soldiers, and Spooks to his memory. He donated a collection of documents of and about the CIDR to the International Institute of Social History.
