= Mohammad Reyshahri =

Iranian politician and cleric (1946–2022)

- محمد محمدی ری‌شهری
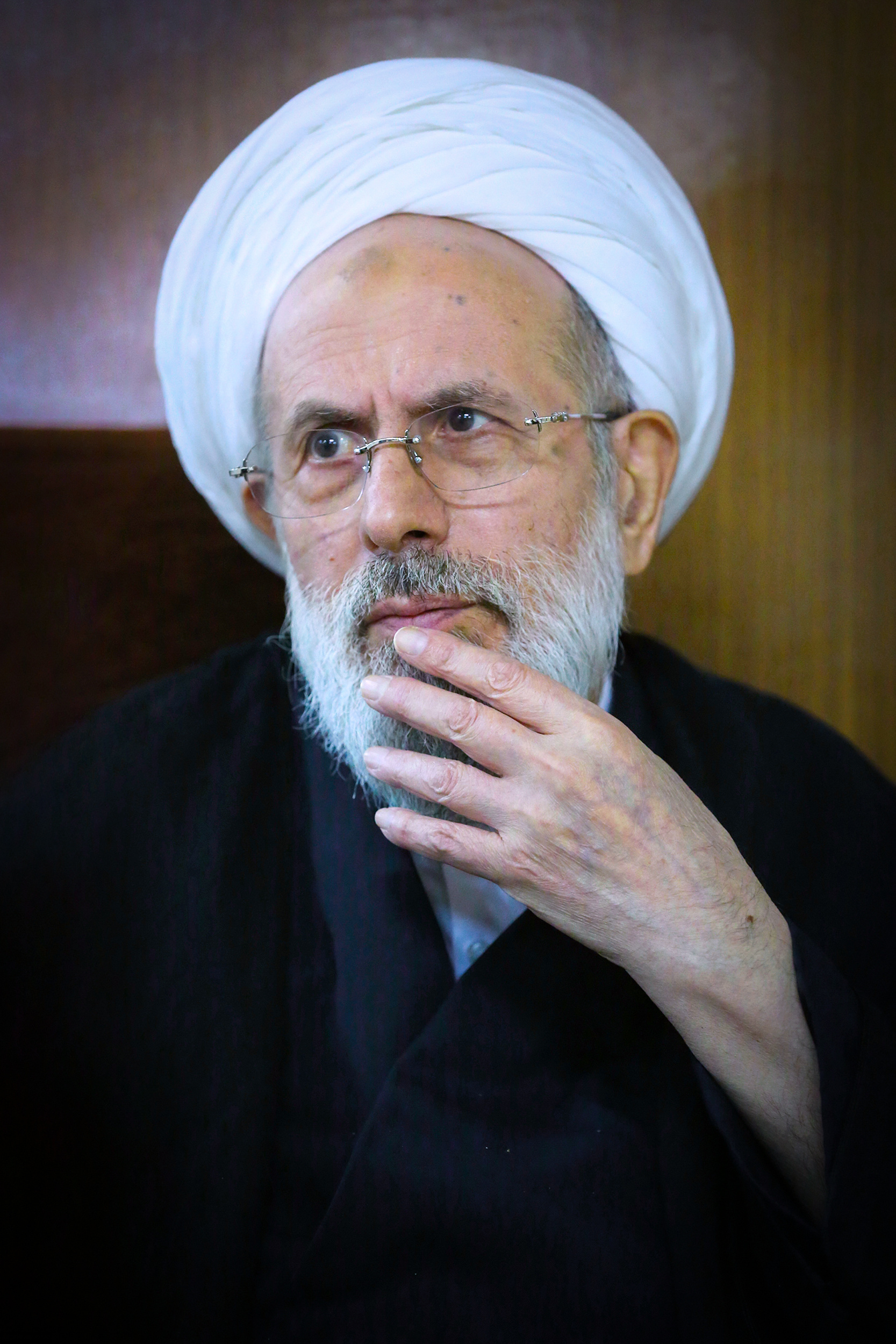
- Reyshahri in 2020

Member of the Assembly of Experts
- In office 24 May 2016 – 21 March 2022
- Constituency: Tehran Province
- Majority: 1,952,563 (43.38%)

Prosecutor-General of Iran
- In office 1989–1991
- Appointed by: Mohammad Yazdi
- President: Ali Khamenei
- Preceded by: Mohammad Mousavi Khoeiniha
- Succeeded by: Seyed Abolfazl Mousavi Tabrizi

1st Minister of Intelligence of Iran
- In office 15 August 1984 – 29 August 1989
- Prime Minister: Mir-Hossein Mousavi
- Preceded by: Position established
- Succeeded by: Ali Fallahian

Personal details
- Born: Mohammad Mohammadi-Nik; 29 October 1946 Rey, Iran
- Died: 21 March 2022 (aged 75) Tehran, Iran
- Party: Association for Defence of Revolution Values (1996–1999)
- Education: Haghani Circle

Mohammad Reyshahri (Persian: محمد محمدی ری‌‌شهری), also known as Mohammad Mohammadi-Nik (29 October 1946 – 21 March 2022), was an Iranian politician, cleric, judge and religious scholar, who notably served as Chief Judge of the Revolutionary Military Tribunal (1979–1984), as the first Minister of Intelligence and Security (1984–1989) in the cabinet of Prime Minister Mir-Hossein Mousavi and as Prosecutor-General of Iran from 1989 to 1991.

== Early life and education ==
Reyshahri was born into a religious Persian family in Rey on 29 October 1946. He was educated in Qom and Najaf in the field of theology. He and his successor at the ministry of intelligence, Ali Fallahian, were alumni of the Haqqani School in Qom.

== Career ==
Reyshahri began to involve himself in political activities in June 1963 during the religious revolts after Khomeini's famous speech in Qom. In 1967, he fled to Najaf and stayed there for a while. Upon his return to Iran, he was imprisoned. While incarcerated, he met Ali Khamenei, who later became supreme leader of Iran. Until the Iranian Revolution, he was banned from preaching.

After the victory of the revolution, Reyshahri served as Chief Judge of the Revolutionary Military Tribunal from 1979 to 1984, and was involved in investigating and purging the plotters of the Nojeh coup (which was planned for 8 July 1980 by supporters of Shapour Bakhtiar and was reported to Reyshahri by Saeed Hajjarian) as well as the Ghotbzadeh coup, which led to the execution of Sadegh Ghotbzadeh and the removal of grand ayatollah Ayatollah Kazem Shariatmadari from being a marja by the Society of Teachers of the Qom Hawza.

From 1984 to 1989, in Prime Minister Mir Hossein Mousavi's cabinet, Reyshahri served as the inaugural Minister of Intelligence and Security. He played a major role in defining and expanding the Ministry's role and remit, collaborating especially with the intelligence services of North Korea, Syria, Libya and South Yemen, which supported Iran during its war with Iraq. Into his tenure also falls the case of Mehdi Hashemi. Reyshahri executed Hashemi two days ahead of schedule on 28 September 1987, so that Reyshahri would not need to follow a letter written by Ayatollah Khomeini on 28 September in which he informed Reyshahri that the sentence had been commuted to internal exile.

Reyshahri was then appointed Prosecutor-General of Iran, serving from 1989 to 1991, and also became Chief Prosecutor of the Special Court for the Clergy in 1990. He drafted the court's 47-article ordinance, which was subsequently passed in 1990. Before the Majlis elections in 1996, he established the Society for the Defence of the Values of the Islamic Revolution.

In 1991 Reyshahri was appointed "Representative on Hajj and Pilgrimage Affairs" by Supreme Leader Ali Khamenei placing him in charge of the new "Organization for Hajj and Pilgrimage". This independent entity was thereafter separate from the office responsible for endowments and charity, with Iranian law stating that "all of the Hajj's cultural, political, and outreach issues are under the exclusive authority of the Supreme Leader's Representative". He continued to hold that post at least until 2007. He was the dean of the Dar Al Hadith Scientific Cultural Institute. Reyshahri was also an unsuccessful presidential candidate in the election on 23 May 1997, which led to the presidency of Mohammad Khatami. He finished in fourth place among the four candidates approved by the Guardian Council.

In 2016, he also became a member of the Assembly of Experts.

== Later life ==
Reyshahri wrote more than 75 books on Islamic teachings, and one of them, entitled The Wisdom of Christ, was translated and published in English in South Africa to mark the New Year in 2022.

Reyshahri died at a hospital in Tehran on 21 March 2022 at the age of 75. At the funeral on 23 March, Ali Khamenei described Reyshahri as "a benevolent person who served the people" and "always a source of blessings".

Government offices
New office	Minister of Intelligence of Iran; 1984–1989	Succeeded by Ali Fallahian
