= Javad Shahrestani =

Iranian politician (1924–2016)

Seyyed Javad Shahrestani
- جواد شهرستانی
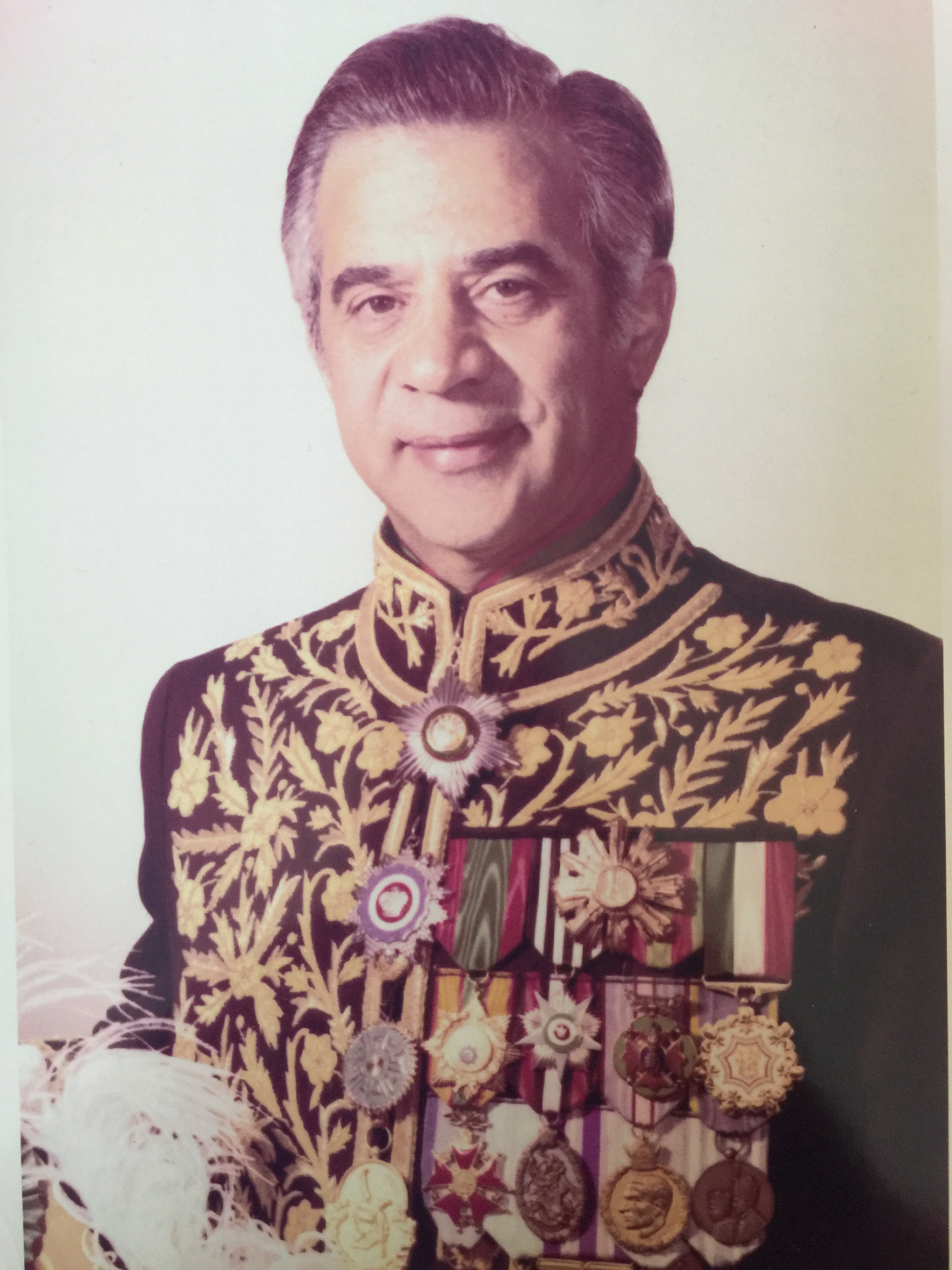
- Javad Shahrestani Minister of Roads

Mayor of Tehran
- In office 23 August 1977 – 11 February 1979
- Preceded by: Gholamreza Nikpey
- Succeeded by: Mohammad Tavasoli
- In office 3 November 1968 – 1 October 1969
- Preceded by: Manouchehr Pirooz
- Succeeded by: Gholamreza Nikpey

Mayor of Mashhad
- In office 1964–1966
- Preceded by: Mohammad Shabanzadeh
- Succeeded by: Seyfollah Razaghi

Personal details
- Born: 1924 Mashhad, Sublime State of Iran
- Died: 9 July 2016 (aged 92) Mashhad, Iran
- Education: University of Tehran
- Occupation: Engineer, Academic, Politician
- Profession: professor at Ferdowsi University of Mashhad

Javad Shahrestani (Persian: جواد شهرستانی; 1924 – 9 July 2016) was an Iranian engineer, academic and politician who served as the mayor of the City of Tehran. He was the last mayor to serve under the Pahlavi dynasty. Born in Mashhad, he first became the mayor of Tehran in 1968 and served until 1969, when he was appointed first to the governorship of Kermanshah from 1969 to 1973 by the Shah of Iran; he was replaced by Gholamreza Nikpey. He was later appointed to the cabinet and was the Minister of Transportation from 1973 to 1976. In 1977 he succeeded Nikpey as mayor and remained in the position until the Islamic Revolution of 1979.

In February 1979, after Ayatollah Ruhollah Khomeini's return to Tehran, and while Shapour Bakhtiar was still prime minister, he submitted his resignation to Khomeini, who in turn reappointed him as mayor.

He was replaced after the revolution by Mohammad Tavasoli, and never held a public position after the revolution.

He is one of the few politicians to serve under the Shah, who was not arrested after the revolution. He became a professor at Ferdowsi University of Mashhad.

== Sources ==
- www.tehran.com
