= Gholamreza Nikpey =

Iranian politician (1927–1979)

- غلامرضا نیک‌پی
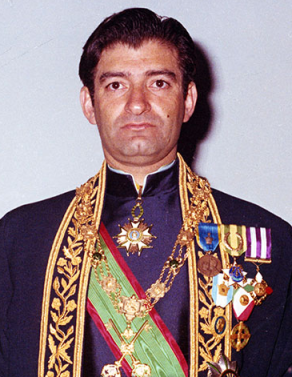

Mayor of Tehran
- In office 1 October 1969 – 23 August 1977
- Preceded by: Javad Shahrestani
- Succeeded by: Javad Shahrestani

Senator from Esfahan
- In office 23 August 1977 – 11 February 1979

Personal details
- Born: 1927 Esfahan, Iran
- Died: 11 April 1979 (aged 51–52) Tehran, Iran
- Education: University of Tehran Law, London School of Economics PhD of Economy
- Occupation: Administrator, Politician

Gholam-Reza Nikpey (غلامرضا نیک‌پی), also Nikpay (1927 – 11 April 1979) was deputy prime minister of Iran and Mayor of Tehran. He became Mayor of Tehran in 1969, succeeding Javad Shahrestani. Prior to that, he had served as Iran's Minister of Housing from 1966 to 1969. During his tenure as the Housing Minister, an earthquake rocked the Province of Khorasan, causing mass destruction. He was in charge of rebuilding. It turned out to be one of the best rebuilding projects in the country's history. In 1977, he was appointed to the Iranian Senate by Mohammad Reza Shah.

He was executed on 11 April 1979 on the orders of a revolutionary tribunal, apparently without legal representation or a chance to defend himself. Nikpey is one of the victims listed in the 13 March 1980 Amnesty International report. International human rights organizations have drawn attention to reports indicating that the Islamic Republic's authorities executed individuals on trumped-up charges.

== Early life ==
Nikpey was born in 1927 in Esfahan to Azizullah Nikpey. His father, also called Ezaz ol-malek, studied in the United States and was governor of the province of Kermanshah during Reza Shah's reign. Azizullah later became Minister of Post and Telegraph. Nikpey's maternal grandfather, Zell-e Soltan, was a part of the Qajar dynasty. As a son of Naser al-Din Shah Qajar Zell-e Soltan was at one point set to succeed his father as shah, however Mozaffar ad-Din Shah Qajar became shah instead. Gholamreza spent his childhood in Isfahan and Kermanshah and entered Tehran University to study law. He went to England to continue his studies and obtained his PhD in 1335 A.H. from the London School of Economics, and then returned to Iran.

After his return, he was employed by the Iranian National Oil Company. He went on to become VP to Prime Minister Hassan Ali Mansur. He was later the director of Kaakh Javanan. He became the mayor of Tehran in 1346 AH. After his tenure as mayor, he went on to become the representative of Esfahan in the Iranian senate. He was later arrested during political arrests later that year. During the Iranian revolution Nikpey was jailed in Tehran and was freed by the revolutionaries.

=== Arrest and execution ===
Nikpey was arrested shortly after the revolution. He was charged with dubious charges such as collaborating with imperialists, collaborating with the Pahlavi regime, not doing enough work as mayor and not fixing traffic problems, taking bribes, changing the comprehensive plan for the city of Tehran, and other non-specific charges and was quickly sentenced to death. He was executed on 11 April 1979.

== Activities as mayor ==
Nikpey made many improvements as mayor of Tehran. Some of his actions include the construction of highways and parks, a comprehensive plan of Tehran, an urban tax, tax for non-rental buses and cars, building parking facilities, limiting the privacy of the capital zone, recycling waste into fertilizer, establishment of a soil mechanics laboratory, creating a development organization and renovation of Abbas Abad, changing the title of sweeper to civil service worker, establishing the development of public revenues, establishment of the Directorate General of Budget, improvement in buses, allocation of funds to build a building for children with disabilities, modification of the capital's mayoral department, allocation of funds for the construction of West Tehran flood, reconstruction of shops in the city that existed before the adoption of the comprehensive plan, building of Niavaran Park, creating an inspection agency, establishing DMV, redeveloping the slaughterhouse and morgue of Tehran, review of Urban Planning Department and urban areas, street parking in the southern area of Persepolis St. (Taleghani), development of public housing and apartment building for municipal staff, park construction and building artificial lake in the south near Azadi Tower, plans to establish public housing and establishing three-bed nursing homes for the elderly in Kahrizak.

=== Seoul visit ===
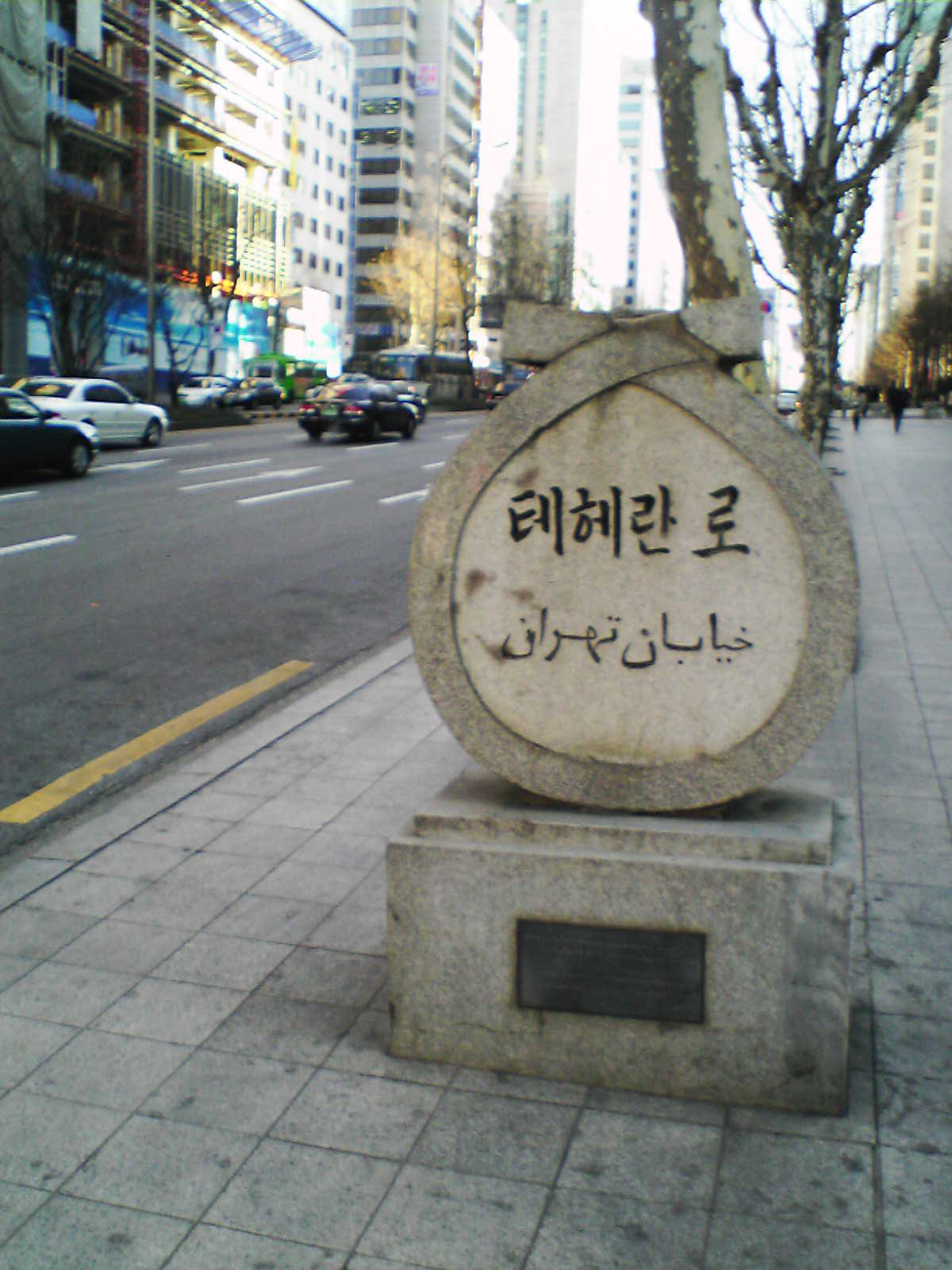
Road post that says "Tehran Road" both in Korean hangul (테헤란로) and Persian (خیابان تهران).

Gholamreza Nikpey travelled to Seoul on 27 June 1977. Seoul Metropolitan Government suggested that the cities of Seoul and Tehran exchange street names on the occasion of the visit to South Korea of Gholamreza Nikpey, Mayor of Tehran. The following year, Samneungno street was renamed Teheran, which then ran through a relatively underdeveloped area recently annexed to Seoul. Today, Teheran-ro is one of Seoul's busiest streets, the location of major finance, tech, and cultural institutions. Likewise, there is a Seoul Street in Tehran.
