= Pirouz Hanachi =

Iranian opportunist politician, former Mayor of Tehran

- پیروز حناچی
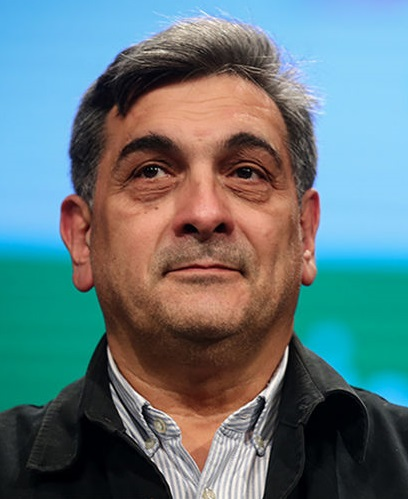

Mayor of Tehran
- In office 28 November 2018 – 8 August 2021; Acting: 18–28 November 2018
- Preceded by: Mohammad-Ali Afshani
- Succeeded by: Alireza Zakani

Personal details
- Born: 11 June 1964 (age 62) Tehran, Iran
- Party: Independent
- Other political affiliations: Reformists Coalition (2006)
- Education: University of Tehran

Pirouz Hanachi (Persian: پیروز حناچی; born 11 June 1963) is an Iranian architect, reformist politician and the former mayor of Tehran, succeeding Mohammad-Ali Afshani.

Hanachi served as deputy mayor for technical and development. He was appointed deputy mayor for urban development and architecture before his appointment as Tehran's mayor.

== Early life ==
Hanachi was born in Tehran in 1963. He holds a Master of Architecture (1991) and PhD (1999) from the University of Tehran. He served as a professor of architecture in the Fine Arts Faculty at the University of Tehran.

== Career ==
=== Mayor ===
Tehran's city council appointed Hanachi mayor on 13 November 2018. Winning 11 votes out of 21, Hanachi is the third mayor appointed by the fifth Islamic City Council of Tehran, and the 14th after the Islamic Revolution in 1979. He is the third mayor to be elected since reformists swept the city-council elections in May 2017. Initially, his security clearance was delayed, possibly in an attempt to damage his reformist movement.

== Electoral history ==
| Year | Election | Votes | % | Rank | Notes |
|---|---|---|---|---|---|
| 2006 | City Council of Tehran | | | | Lost |

Civic offices
| Preceded by Mohammad-Ali Afshani | Mayor of Tehran; 2018–2021 | Succeeded by Alireza Zakani |
