= Reza Zavare'i =

Iranian jurist and politician

Seyyed Reza Zavareʾi
- رضا زواره‌ای
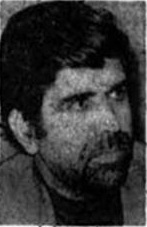

Head of Realestate and Documents Registration Organization
- In office 1989–1997

Member of Parliament of Iran
- In office 27 October 1981 – 28 May 1988
- Constituency: Tehran, Rey and Shemiranat
- Majority: 1,715,210 (48.90%)

Acting Mayor of Tehran
- In office 5 January 1981 – 14 January 1981
- Appointed by: Mohammad-Reza Mahdavi Kani
- Preceded by: Mohammad Tavasoli
- Succeeded by: Kamaleddin Nikravesh

Prosecutor of Islamic Revolutionary Court
- In office 1979–1980

Personal details
- Born: 1938 Hesar-e Kuchek, Varamin, Iran
- Died: 26 August 2005 (aged 68) Varamin, Iran
- Party: Islamic Coalition Party; Islamic Republican Party

Reza Zavareʾi (Persian: رضا زواره‌ای; 1938 – 26 August 2005) was an Iranian jurist and politician. He served as a member of the Member of Guardian Council from 1995 to 1996, and 1998 to 2004.

He was acting mayor of Tehran, deputy head of the judiciary in charge of the real estate and documents registration organization from 1989 to 1997. Zavareʾi was also prosecutor of the Islamic Revolution Court in Tehran and a deputy to interior minister after the 1979 revolution.
