= Mohammad-Ali Afshani =

Iranian politician

Seyyed Mohammad-Ali Afshani
- محمّدعلی افشانی
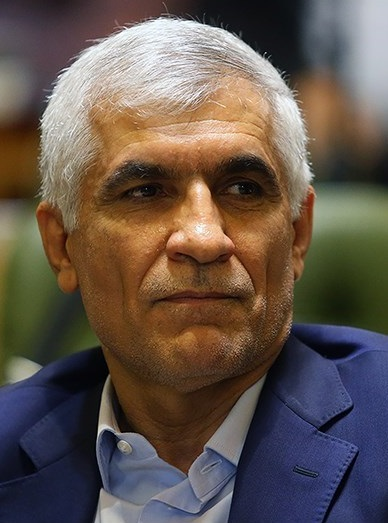

Mayor of Tehran
- In office 16 May 2018 – 17 November 2018
- Preceded by: Mohammad-Ali Najafi
- Succeeded by: Pirouz Hanachi

Governor of Fars province
- In office 17 July 2015 – 13 September 2017
- President: Hassan Rouhani
- Preceded by: Mohammad Ahmadi
- Succeeded by: Ismail Tabadar

Personal details
- Born: 1960 (age 65–66) Dehdasht, Kohgiluyeh and Boyer-Ahmad province, Imperial State of Iran
- Party: National Trust Party

Mohammad-Ali Afshani (Persian: محمدعلی افشانی; born 1960 in Dehdasht, Kohgiluyeh and Boyer-Ahmad province) is an Iranian politician who was the mayor of Tehran from May to November 2018. Afshani was elected Mayor by the Islamic City Council of Tehran on 13 May 2018, with 19 out of 21 votes in favor, succeeding the interim mayor Samiollah Hosseini Makarem on 16 May. He was previously the governor of Fars province from 17 July 2015 to 13 September 2017.

Civic offices
Preceded by Samiollah Hosseini Makarem (acting)	Mayor of Tehran; 2018	Succeeded by Pirouz Hanachi
