= Mehdi Noorbakhsh =

Iranian academic and activist

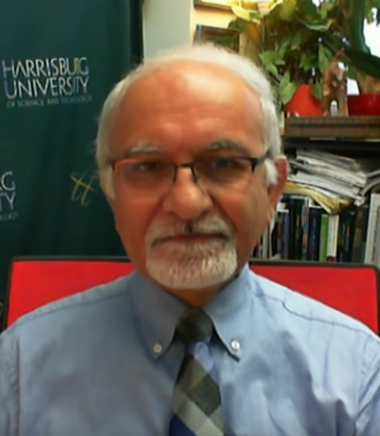
- Born: Mehdi Noorbakhsh-Dehkordi; 1954 (age 71–72); Iran
- Spouse: Sarah Noorbakhsh (née Yazdi)
- Relatives: Ebrahim Yazdi (father-in-law)

Academic background
- Education: University of Texas at Austin; University of Houston
- Thesis: From Opposition to Revolution: The Dynamics of Change in Iran and Afghanistan (1996)

Academic work
- Discipline: International relations
- School or tradition: Religious intellectualism
- Institutions: Harvard University; University of St. Thomas; Harrisburg University

Mehdi Noorbakhsh (Persian: مهدی نوربخش) is an Iranian academic and political activist affiliated with the Freedom Movement of Iran.

He is a professor of international affairs & business at Harrisburg University of Science and Technology, having previously taught at the Center for International Studies at the University of St. Thomas in Houston and worked at Harvard University's Center for Middle Eastern Studies as a postdoctoral fellow. Noorbakhsh is vice president of World Affairs Councils of America's chapter in Harrisburg, Pennsylvania.

He is not able to return to Iran for his political activities, as well as public comments.

== Early life and education ==
Noorbakhsh was born in Iran and immigrated to the United States sometime in the 1970s. He is married to Sarah, a physician and daughter of Ebrahim Yazdi. He obtained a government and international affairs PhD from University of Texas at Austin in 1996.

== Views ==
A The Patriot-News editorial published in 2010 described him as "Muslim moderate". Noorbakhsh assumes that by seeking rationality within Islam, it can be practiced as a "progressive" faith, while a religious regime of despotic nature would exploit individual spirituality in that society. He had criticized Jyllands-Posten for 2005 cartoons depicting Muhammad due to "selective targeting" of "the very sanctity of the Muslim faith", and alleged that American policymakers should avoid confrontation with the Muslim world.

== Published works ==
- Al-Suwaidi, Jamal S., ed. (1997), "Religion, Politics, and Ideological Trends in Contemporary Iran", Iran and the Gulf: A Search for Stability, I. B. Tauris, ISBN 978-1860641435
- Noorbaksh, Mehdi (September 1993), "The Middle East, Islam And The United States: The Special Case Of Iran", Middle East Policy, 2 (3): 78–97, doi:10.1111/j.1475-4967.1993.tb00087.x
- Noorbaksh, Mehdi (Summer 2008), "Shiism and Ethnic Politics in Iraq" (PDF), Middle East Policy, 15 (2): 53–65, doi:10.1111/j.1475-4967.2008.00349.x
- "Reviewed Work: Political Science: An Islamic Perspective by Abdul Rashid Moten", International Journal of Middle East Studies, 30 (1): 117–119, February 1998, doi:10.1017/S0020743800065594, JSTOR 164207, S2CID 155044540
- "Reviewed Work: Musaddiq's Memoirs: The End of the British Empire in Iran by Muhammad Musaddiq, Homa Katouzian", Iranian Studies, 23 (1/4): 142–145, 1990, JSTOR 4310745
- "Reviewed Work: Parliamentary Politics in Revolutionary Iran: The Institutionalization of Factional Politics by Bahman Baktiari", International Journal of Middle East Studies, 31 (1): 149–152, February 1999, doi:10.1017/S0020743800053216, JSTOR 176355, S2CID 144891752
