= Ziaeddin Shademan =

Iranian basketball player

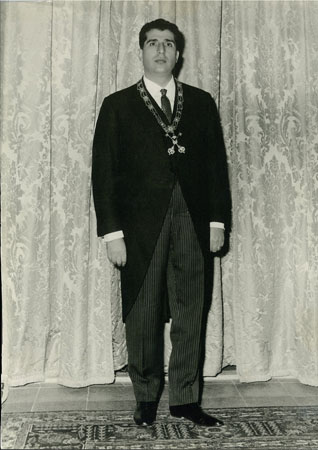

Personal information
- Nationality: Iranian
- Born: 27 November 1923 Tehran, Sublime State of Iran
- Died: 12 March 2009 (aged 85) Montreal, Canada

Sport
- Sport: Basketball

Ziaeddin Shademan (Persian: ضیاءالدین شادمان; 27 November 1923 – 12 March 2009) was an Iranian basketball player. He competed in the men's tournament at the 1948 Summer Olympics.

He was the 36th mayor of Tehran from 1963 to 1965. He resigned after 14 months in office.

== See also ==
- List of mayors of Tehran
