= Association for Defence of Revolution Values =

Population for Defence of Islamic Revolution Values جمعیت دفاع از ارزش‌های انقلاب اسلامی
- Secretary-General: Mohammad Reyshahri
- Deputy: Ruhollah Hosseinian
- Founded: February 17, 1996
- Legalised: October 14, 1997
- Dissolved: November 15, 1999
- Headquarters: Tehran, Iran
- Newspaper: Arzeshha
- Ideology: Cultural conservatism Social justice
- Political position: Right-wing
- Religion: Islam
- National affiliation: Principlists

Association for Defence of Islamic Revolution Values (Persian: جمعیت دفاع از ارزش‌های انقلاب اسلامی; Jam`īyat-e Defā` az Arzeshhā-ye Enqelāb-e Eslāmī) was a neo-principlist political party in Iran, founded by Mohammad Reyshahri. The party was defeated in the 1996 parliamentary and the 1997 presidential elections.

The party's line was similar to those of the Combatant Clergy Association, and its core members were former counterparts of Reyshahri at the Ministry of Intelligence. Ali Akbar Aboutorabi Fard, Ruhollah Hosseinian, Mohammad Shariatmadari, Ahmad Pournejati and Ali Razini were among notable members.
