= Ebrahim Yazdi =

Iranian politician and activist (1931–2017)

- ابراهیم یزدی
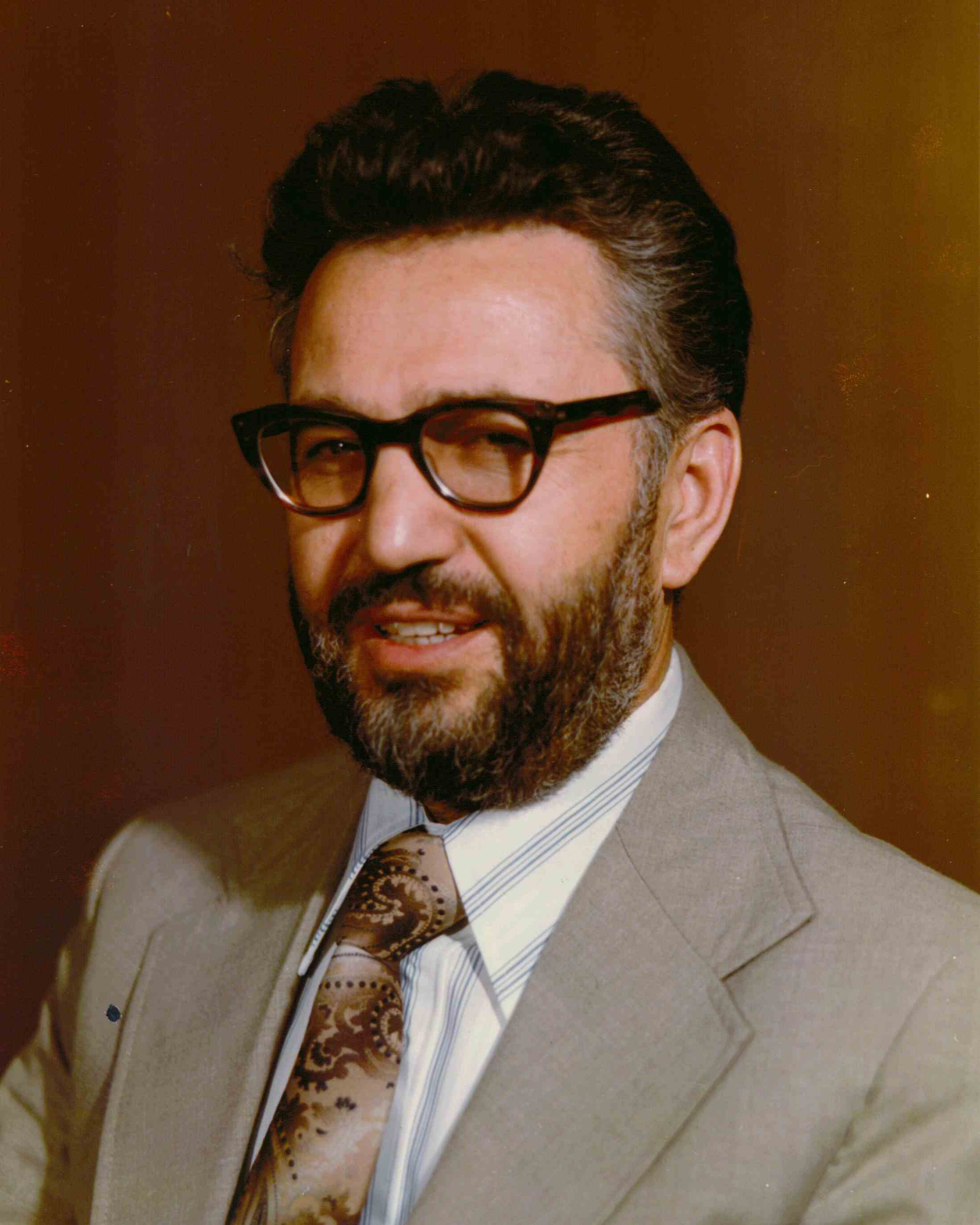
- Yazdi in 1979

Minister of Foreign Affairs of Iran
- In office 12 April 1979 – 12 November 1979
- Prime Minister: Mehdi Bazargan
- Preceded by: Karim Sanjabi
- Succeeded by: Abolhassan Banisadr (acting)

Deputy Prime Minister of Iran for Revolutionary Affairs
- In office 13 February 1979 – 12 April 1979
- Prime Minister: Mehdi Bazargan
- Succeeded by: Mostafa Chamran

Member of the Parliament of Iran
- In office 28 May 1980 – 28 May 1984
- Constituency: Tehran, Rey and Shemiranat
- Majority: 1,128,304 (52.9%)

Personal details
- Born: 26 September 1931 Qazvin, Iran
- Died: 27 August 2017 (aged 85) İzmir, Turkey
- Citizenship: Iran; United States (1971–1979)
- Party: Freedom Movement of Iran (1961–2017); National Front (1953–61); Movement of God-Worshipping Socialists (1947–53)
- Relatives: Mohammad Tavasoli (brother-in-law); Mehdi Noorbakhsh (son-in-law)
- Education: University of Tehran; Baylor College of Medicine

Ebrahim Yazdi (Persian: ابراهیم یزدی; 26 September 1931 – 27 August 2017) was an Iranian revolutionary, political dissident, scientist, and diplomat. He served as deputy prime minister and minister of foreign affairs in the interim government of Mehdi Bazargan until his resignation in November 1979 in protest to the taking of the US Embassy at the start of the Iran hostage crisis. From 1995 until 2017, he headed the Freedom Movement of Iran, a leading opposition movement to the Shah before the 1979 revolution, and the leading opposition to Iran's clerical regime after the revolution, other than a brief 8 month period in the Interim Government. Yazdi was also a trained cancer researcher.

== Early life and education ==
Yazdi was born in Qazvin on 26 September 1931. He studied pharmacy at the University of Tehran. Then he received a master's degree in philosophy again from the University of Tehran.

After the military coup of 1953, which deposed the government of Mohammad Mossadegh, Yazdi joined the underground National Resistance Movement of Iran, and was active in this organization from 1953 to 1960. This organization opposed to the Shah, Mohammad Reza Pahlavi. Yazdi traveled to the United States in 1961 to continue his education and in the US, continued his involvement in political activities against the Shah.

He was co-founder of the Freedom Movement of Iran, Abroad, along with Mostafa Chamran, Ali Shariati, and Sadegh Qotbzadeh in 1961. They were all part of the external wing of the group. In 1963, Yazdi, Chamran and Ghotbzadeh went to Egypt and met the authorities to establish an anti-Shah organization in the country, which was later called SAMA, special organization for unity and action. Chamran was chosen as its military head before returning to the US. In 1966, Yazdi moved headquarters of SAMA to Beirut. In 1967, he enrolled at Baylor College of Medicine in Houston (which before 1969 was part of the Baylor University system) and received a PhD in biochemistry.

In 1975, Yazdi was tried in absentia in an Iranian military court and condemned to ten years imprisonment, with orders issued for his arrest upon return to Iran. Because of his activities, he was unable to return to Iran and remained in the United States until July 1977. He became a naturalized US citizen in Houston in 1971. When Ayatollah Khomenei moved to Neauphle-le-Château, a Parisian suburb, from Iraq in 1978, Yazdi also went to Neauphle-le-Château and began to serve as an advisor to the Ayatollah. He was also his spokesperson in Paris.

== Career and political activities ==
Yazdi worked as a research assistant of pathology and research instructor of pharmacology at Baylor College of Medicine in Houston until 1977. He also worked at the Veterans Administration Hospital in Houston. From 1961 to 1977, Yazdi founded the Muslim Students Association from the United States and later became a spokesman for Paris-based Ayatollah Ruhollah Khomeini.

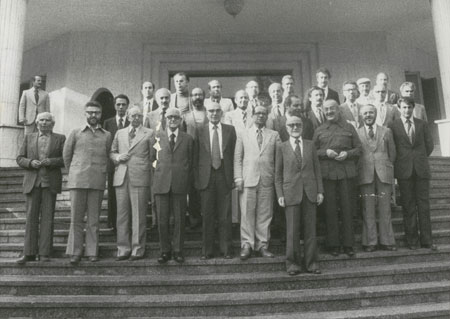
Yazdi as part of Interim Government of Iran

In 1978, he joined Ayatollah Khomeini in Paris where the latter had been in exile and became one of his advisors. He translated the reports of Khomeini into English in a press conference on 3 February 1979 in Tehran. He was the deputy prime minister and minister of foreign affairs in the interim government of Mehdi Bazargan, until 6 November 1979. Yazdi proposed to celebrate 'Quds Day' and his suggestion was endorsed by Khomeini in August 1979; In May 1980, he was appointed by Khomenei as head of the Kayhan newspaper.

The day after the victory of the revolution, on 2 February 1979, several foreign embassies in Tehran, including those of the United States, the United Kingdom, and Yugoslavia were over-run by groups identifying themselves as leftist revolutionaries. The opinion of the Revolutionary Council, of which Yazdi was a member, was that these attacks may be aimed at creating chaos and preventing the international recognition of the new regime. In the case of the US embassy, the attackers were successful in entering the embassy compound and taking personnel, including the US ambassador, William Sullivan, captive. Yazdi, at the request of Ayatollah Khomeini and the Revolutionary Council, went to the embassies and resolved the crisis, resulting in the release of embassy personnel and the departure of the attackers.

On 4 November 1979, the US embassy was taken over for a second time, this time by a group calling itself "Students Following the Line of the Imam (i.e. Ayatollah Khomeini)" and led by Mohammad Mousavi Khoeiniha, who had closer ties to certain revolutionary leaders.

As before, Yazdi was asked to go to the embassy and resolve the crisis. He asked and received permission of Khomeini to expel the occupiers, but shortly thereafter found out Khomeini had changed his mind and appeared on state television openly endorsed the takeover of the embassy. The entire cabinet of the interim government, including Yazdi and Prime Minister Mehdi Bazargan, resigned in protest the next day. They stated that they opposed the embassy takeover as "contrary to the national interest of Iran".

The embassy takeover is considered to have been motivated in part by an internal struggle between various factions within the revolutionary leadership, with Yazdi and Bazargan on one side, and more radical clergy on the other. The embassy attackers, in subsequent statements indicated that one of their primary objectives in the takeover of the US embassy in November 1979 was to force the resignation of Yazdi, Bazargan, and the entire cabinet.

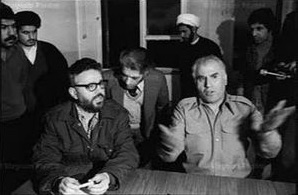
Yazdi (left) and lieutenant general Mehdi Rahimi (right) in a press conference in February 1979. Rahimi was executed on 16 February.

Among the areas of conflict between the two factions was the behavior of the Revolutionary Courts and the Revolutionary Committees. Yazdi and Bazargan supported a general amnesty for all members of the Shah's regime, provided that they cease to act against the revolution. He publicly opposed the secret trials and the summary executions carried out by the Revolutionary Courts, led by Ayatollah Sadegh Khalkhaali. Bazargan and other members of the interim government may have called for fair and open trials for those in charge of political posts under the Shah. The radical clerics, on the other hand, stated that the rapid trials and executions were essential to protect the revolution. "He was the voice of the Iranian revolution and that voice was talking about freedom, democracy and women's rights. This was something he truly believed in and he was proven to be wrong because that's not what the revolution turned out to be. It became a killing machine after the takeover. He protested vigorously against the judicial killings of people who had been close to Shah and that got him into trouble with people around Khomeini."

After resignation from office, Yazdi and other members of the Freedom Movement of Iran ran in elections for the first post-revolutionary Islamic Consultative Assembly or parliament. Yazdi, Bazargan, and four other members of the Freedom Movement, namely Mostafa Chamran, Ahmad Sadr, Hashem Sabbaghian, and Yadollah Sahabi, were elected. They served at the parliament from 1980 to 1984.

After the Iraqi invasion of Iran in September 1980, Yazdi fully supported the Iranian war effort against the invasion, but opposed the continuation of the war after the Iranian victory in Khorramshahr in 1982. The war continued for an additional six years. During these six years, Yazdi and others in the Freedom Movement issued several open letters to Ayatollah Khomeini opposing the continuation of the war. These letters and other public statements resulted in the firebombing of Yazdi's residence in Tehran in 1985, and the arrest and imprisonment of several members of the Freedom Movement.

In subsequent elections in Iran for president, parliament, and city councils, Yazdi and other members of the Freedom Movement filed for candidacy but were barred from running by the Guardian Council, because of their opposition to policies and actions of the government.

In December 1997, Yazdi was arrested on unknown charges and detained in Evin prison in Tehran. Even after his release, he was barred from leaving the country for many years, and summoned on a regular basis to answer questions before the revolutionary council, with his lawyer, Nobel Prize–winning Shirin Ebadi. As of 2008 Yazdi is still accused of "attempting to convert the rule of velaii (jurisprudence) into democratic rule."

After the death of Bazargan in January 1995, Yazdi was elected as leader of Freedom Movement of Iran. Under pressure from the revolutionary court prosecutor, Yazdi offered his resignation as FMI Leader from on 20 March 2011 to the leadership council of the FMI. They have yet to accept his resignation and Yazdi continued to function as the leader of the Freedom Movement of Iran.

=== Electoral history ===
Year	Election	Votes	%	Rank	Notes
1980	Parliament	1,128,304	52.9	15th	Won
1989	President	—N/a			Disqualified
1993	President	—N/a			Disqualified
1997	President	—N/a			Disqualified
2005	President	—N/a			Disqualified

== Later years and death ==
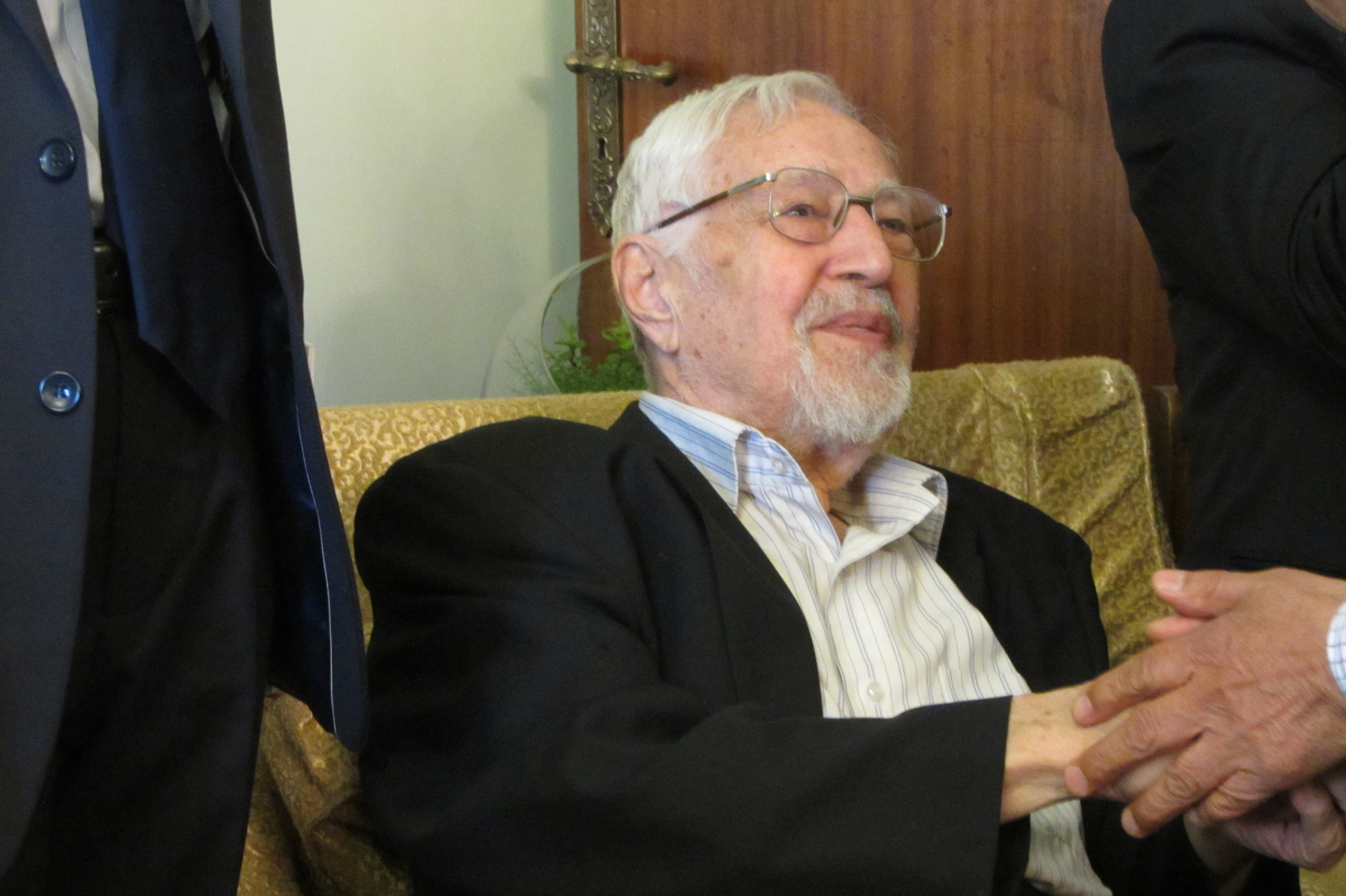
Ebrahim Yazdi in his last Norouz in 2017

Yazdi was arrested in December 1997 for "desecrating religious sanctities" for comments made against Iranian clerical leaders. He was freed on 26 December on bail. On 17 June 2009, during the 2009 Iranian "Green Movement" election protests, it was reported that Yazdi was arrested while undergoing medical tests at the Tehran hospital according to the Freedom Movement of Iran website. On 22 June, he was released back to the hospital for a medical procedure. On 28 December 2009, Yazdi was arrested again in the wake of renewed protests, according to the Jaras reformist website.

Yazdi and several others were arrested on 1 October 2010 in Isfahan for participating in an "illegal Friday prayer." All others were freed within days. Ebrahim Yazdi remained in "temporary custody"—first in Evin prison and then in a "secure" facility under the control of Iran's security forces until March 2011. He was released in April 2011.

On 27 August 2017, Yazdi died of pancreatic cancer, at the age of 85 in İzmir, Turkey, where he was under treatment. His body transferred to Iran and was buried in Behesht-e Zahra.

== Selected works ==
- Aakhareen Talaash-ha Dar Aakhareen Rooz-ha (Final Efforts, Final Days), Qalam Publications, 1984 (13th edition, 1999) (a report and analysis on the Iranian Islamic Revolution of 1979)
- Principles of Molecular Genetics (Third Edition), Ettela'aat Publications, Tehran, 2000
- Mutational Changes in Generic Materials, Matin Cultural Foundation, Tehran, 1986
- Seh Jumhuri (The Three Republics), Jaameye Iranian Publications, 2000 (a compilation of political essays and articles by Ebrahim Yazdi published in Iranian journals from 1997 to 2000)
- Khatti Dar Darya (A Line in the Sea), Qalam Publications, Tehran, 2000 (a new interpretation of the verse of the Quran on "Marajul Bahrain")
- Khaak-haa-ye Rosi va Paydaayesh-e Hayaat (Clay Minerals and the Origin of Life), Qalam Publications, 2001 (a new interpretation of the verses of the Quran on "Teen-e Laatheb")
- Kalbod Shekaafee-ye Towte-e: Barresee-ye Kudetaa-ye Beestohasht-e Mordaad 1332 (The Anatomy of a Plot: An Analysis of the Coup of August 1953), Qalam Publications, 2002 (a collection of essays on the US and British led military coup against the national government of Mohammad Mossadegh)
- Docterin-e Amniyyat-e Melli (National Security Doctrine), Sarai Publications, Tehran, 2004 (a compilation of political essays on Iranian foreign affairs from 1980 to 2004)
- Jonbesh-e Daaneshju-yi-e Iran 1320–1340 (The Iranian Student Movement from 1941–1961), Qalam Publications, 2004 (a history and memoirs of the student movement and activities of Ebrahim Yazdi during this period)
- Yazdī, Ibrāhīm (2015). Shaṣt sāl-i ṣabūrī va shakūrī : khāṭirāt-i Duktur Ibrāhīm Yazdī [Sixty Years of Perseverance and Thankfulness: The Memoirs of Dr Ebrahim Yazdi]. Tihrān: Sāzmān-i Hunarī Risānahʹ ī-i Awj. ISBN 978-964-214-090-9. OCLC 922639770.

== Other sources ==
- J D Stempel, Inside the Iranian Revolution, Indiana Univ Press, 1981
- Sadegh Khalkhali, Khateraateh Khalkhaali (Memoirs of Khalkhaali), Sayeh Publications, Tehran, 2003
- Abdolali Bazargan, ed, Moshketaal va Masa'ele Av'valeen Saale Enghelaab Az Zabaane Mohandes Bazargaan (Issues of the First Year of the Revolutions as Explained by Mehdi Bazargan), Tehran, 1981

Political offices
Preceded by Karim Sanjabi	Foreign minister of Iran; 1979	Succeeded by Sadegh Ghotbzadeh
Party political offices
Preceded by Mehdi Bazargan	Secretary-General of Freedom Movement of Iran; 1995–2017	Succeeded by Mohammad Tavasoli
Preceded by Abbas Amir-Entezam	Head of Political Bureau of Freedom Movement of Iran; 1979–1995	Succeeded by Mohammad Tavasoli
Media offices
Preceded by Mostafa Mesbahzadeh	Head of Kayhan Institute; 1979–1981	Succeeded by Mohammad Khatami
