= Ahmad Pournejati =

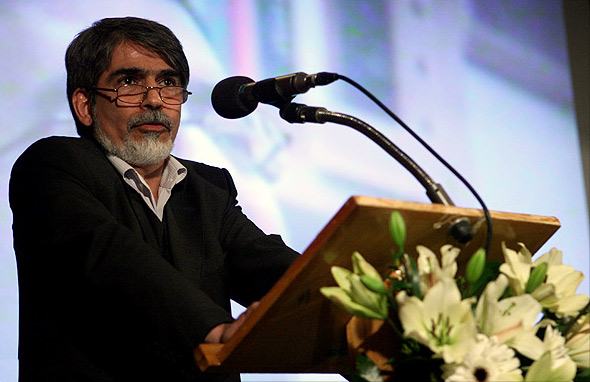

Member of the Parliament of Iran
- In office 28 May 2000 – 28 May 2004
- Constituency: Tehran, Rey, Shemiranat and Eslamshahr
- Majority: 1,070,122 (36.20%)

Personal details
- Born: c. 1954 (age 71–72) Qom, Iran
- Party: Islamic Iran Participation Front
- Other political affiliations: Association for Defence of Revolution Values (1996–1999)
- Website: pournejati.com

Ahmad Pournejati (Persian: احمد پورنجاتی) is an Iranian reformist politician who served a member of the Parliament of Iran from 2000 to 2004 representing Tehran, Rey, Shemiranat and Eslamshahr.

He was also a deputy director of the Islamic Republic of Iran Broadcasting.
