= Mohammad Ali Keshavarz Sadr =

Iranian politician, lawyer, judge, and author (1902–1974)

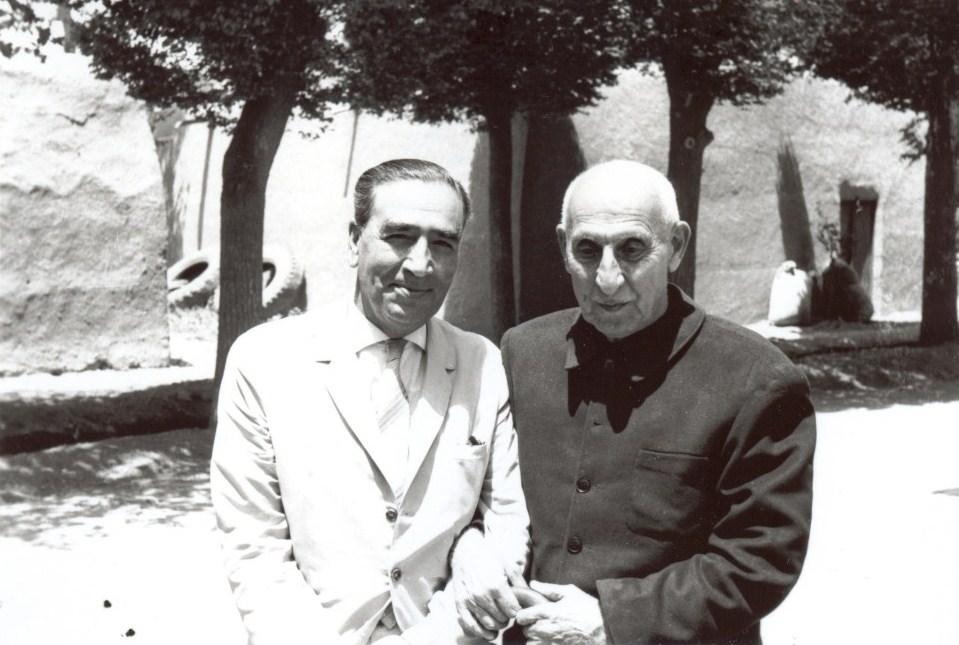

Governor of Tehran
- In office 1950–?
- Prime Minister: Mohammad Mosaddegh

Governor of Gilan
- In office 1951–?
- Preceded by: Arsalan Khalatbari
- Succeeded by: Ali Akbar Saif Afshar

Governor of Isfahan
- In office 1952 – 19 November 1953
- Preceded by: Abraham Zand
- Succeeded by: Hassan Seraj Hejazi

Head of NF Student Affairs
- In office 1961–1974

Personal details
- Born: Mahallat, Iran
- Party: National Front of Iran

Seyyed Mohammad Ali Keshavarz Sadr (Persian: سید محمدعلی کشاورز صدر; 1902 – 17 October 1974) was a lawyer, judge, author and leading figure in the National Front of Iran. A close friend and associate of Prime Minister Mohammad Mosaddegh, often acting as his official deputy, he nationalised the Iranian fishing industry and played a major role in the nationalization of the Iranian oil industry. He served as governor of Isfahan, Gilan and Tehran. He entered parliament as representative of Khorramabad. After resisting the 1953 Iranian coup d'état which toppled the democratically elected government of Mossadegh, Keshavarz Sadr was imprisoned and tortured. After his release he became spokesperson of the Second National Front and wrote a range of books.

== Early life ==
Keshavarz Sadr was born into a landowning, aristocratic family. His father Seyyed Hossein Khan (Mirza Kouchek Khan) ‘Bahador ol-Molk’ was a landowner from Khomeyn, who owned several villages and estates around Mahallat and who served as a military commander in the constitutionalist army. His father was a stepbrother of Prime Minister Mohsen Sadr (Sadr ol-Ashraf II). His mother Mariam Keshavarz was his father's cousin. The couple also had another son named Ali Mohammad Keshavarz Sadr. From the marriage of his father with Haj Malek(eh) Khanoum Khajeh Nassiri (a cousin of Mohsen Sadr), Keshavarz Sadr had two half-sisters: Eghlim Sadat and Shazdeh Aqa Keshavarz (Sadr).

Keshavarz Sadr earned a degree from the Graduate School of Law in Tehran and proceeded to work as a lawyer at the Justice Department. He was appointed as the Director General Inspector of the Ministry of Justice and would rise to become the Head of the Judiciary in 1946.

== First National Front ==
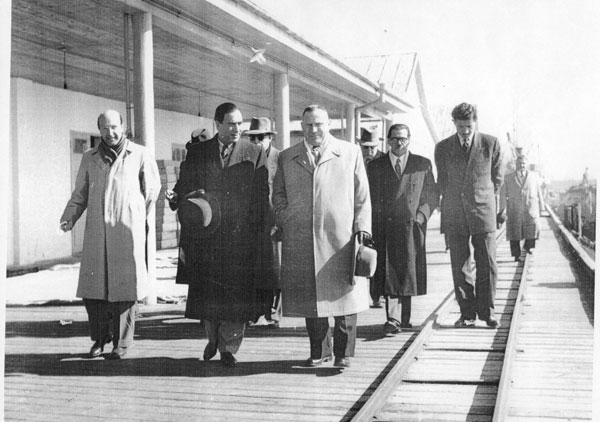
Mohammad Ali Keshavarz Sadr with USSR envoy

He was a founding member of the National Front of Iran. He was first elected into the 15th and 16th Iranian Majlis as representative of Khorramabad and subsequently served as governor of Gilan, where his main concern was the implementation of the nationalisation of fisheries. At the end of January 1953, the Soviet request for an extension of their expired concession was turned down. In a meeting between Keshavarz Sadr and a USSR envoy on a ship in the Caspian Sea, the Iranian fishing industries were officially nationalised.

He became the governor of Isfahan (a key province for Mossadegh), one of his recent predecessors being Mohammad Sa'ed. Keshavarz Sadr was one of ‘the eleven men’ who proposed the bill of oil nationalisation to the Iranian Majlis. He resisted the coup d'état in August 1953 until his residency collapsed following a military attack. He was subject to solitary confinement and torture while under house arrest for 8 months.

== Second National Front ==
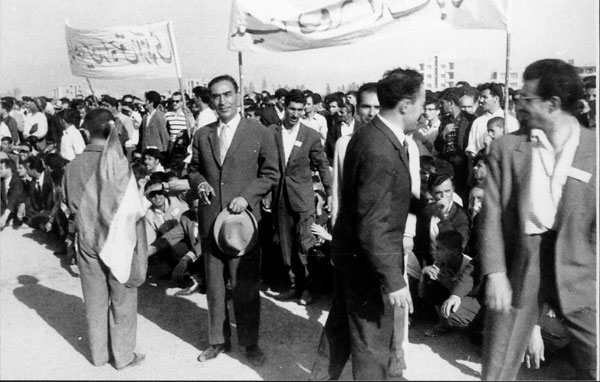
Keshavarz Sadr before his speech at a National Front gathering in the early 1960s

Mossadegh, whilst under house arrest, chose Keshavarz Sadr as his personal lawyer, which made him one of few legally allowed to visit the former Prime Minister. In 1960, Keshavarz Sadr, with the assistance of other prominent nationalists, formed the Second National Front of which he would be main spokesman until 1963. Mohammad Reza Pahlavi could not but recognise the movement due to pressure from the international community.

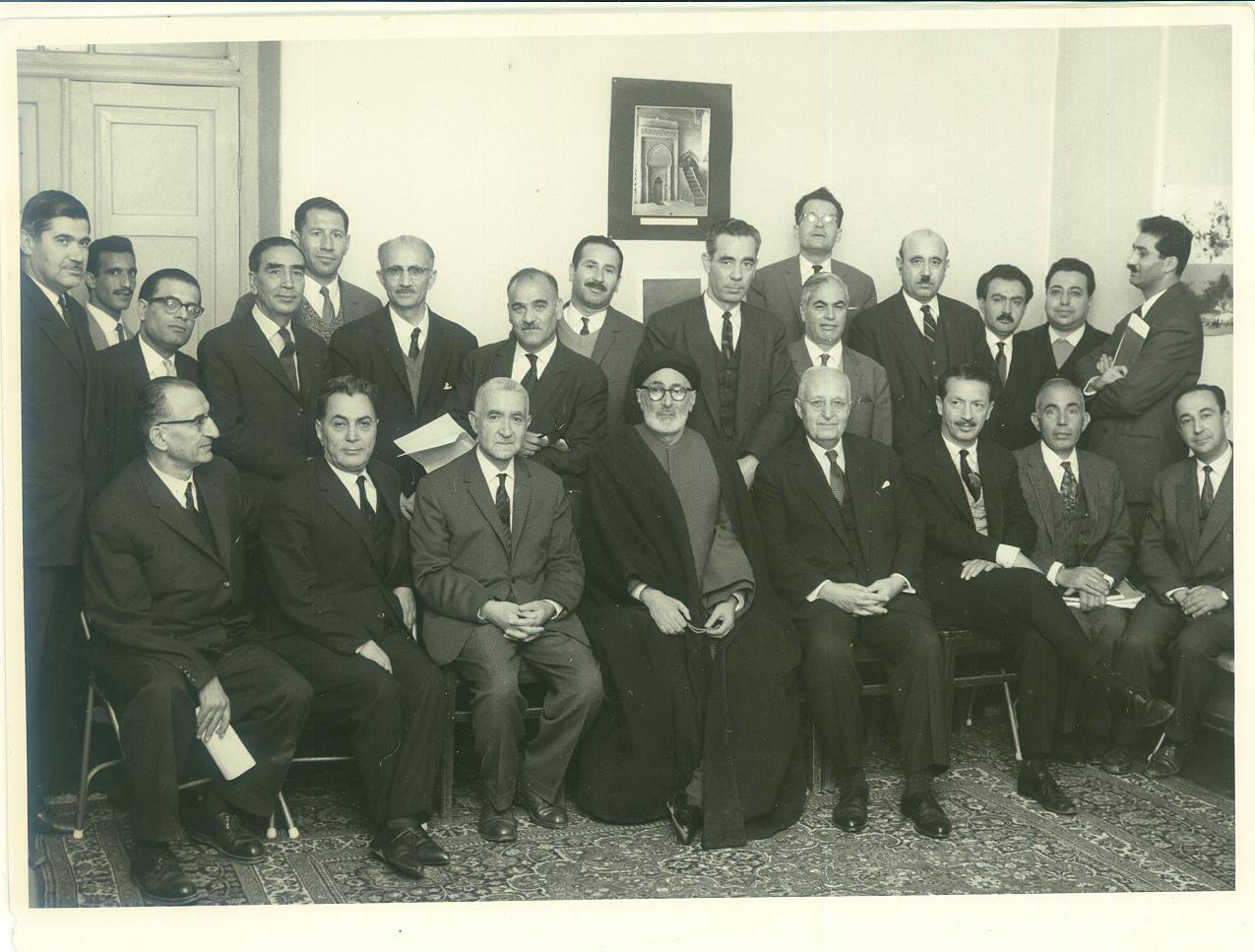
Members of the Central Council of the Second National Front. Keshavarz Sadr, fourth from left (standing). Behind him Saied Fatemi, nephew of Hossein Fatemi

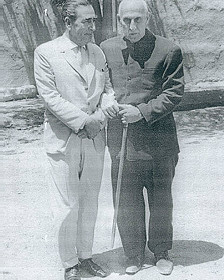
Keshavarz Sadr with former Prime Minister Mohammad Mossadegh in Ahmadabad (circa 1965/66)

On 30 January 1961, the headquarters of the National Front was closed down by the police. The National Front leadership decided to attract attention with a sit-in in the Senate building. The delegation included, amongst others, Keshavarz Sadr himself, Mehdi Bazargan and Kazem Hassibi. Keshavarz Sadr, who also dealt with NF student affairs, would be routinely arrested and interrogated by SAVAK, the state secret police, until his death.

He died in 1974 following a heart attack. The Pahlavi regime prevented his funeral from taking place, presumably to avert the large gathering of National Front supporters.

== Literary Activities ==
Keshavarz Sadr published a series of well-received articles dealing with constitutional law and Iranian legal procedures. He also researched the ancient literature and history of Iran. His most important works are his literary commentaries. He wrote a book that exclusively deals with female poets (Az Räbe'eh ta Parvin).

== Private life ==
His brother Ali Mohammad Keshavarz Sadr became an architect and married Badri Sadat Pasandideh, daughter of Ayatollah Morteza Pasandideh, the older brother of Ayatollah Ruhollah Khomeini.

His sister Khanoum Eghlim Sadat Keshavarz (Sadr) (1922–2018) married post- and telegraph director, judge, poet, diarist and historian Amir Houshang Khan Khosrovani, whose poetic soirées were attended by Mohammad-Hossein Shahriar and others.

His son, Amir Houshang Keshavarz Sadr, was a scholar of Iranian history and society.

== Legacy ==
Mossadegh's grandson held particular praise for Mohammad Ali Keshavarz Sadr and Tehran Mayor Nosratollah Amini, saying of the former that he was “on his own standing, a well-known and respected statesman (…) these men would use their integrity, their clout, their prestige and age to do positive things.”

Party political offices
Unknown	Spokesperson of the National Front; 1960–1963	Vacant Title next held by Dariush Forouhar
