= Mostafa Salimi (mayor) =

Iranian municipal official

- مصطفی سلیمی
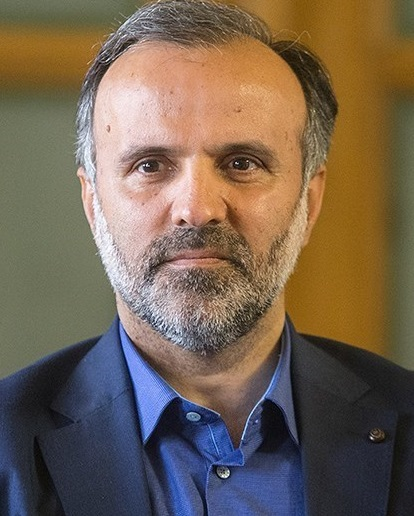

Acting Mayor of Tehran
- In office 27 August 2017
- Preceded by: Mohammad Bagher Ghalibaf
- Succeeded by: Mohammad-Ali Najafi

Mostafa Salimi (Persian: مصطفی سلیمی) is an Iranian municipal official who was appointed as the acting Mayor of Tehran on 27 August 2017, an office he held only for hours.

He previously served as the mayor of Tehran's districts 6, 21 and 18.

In 2014, he was appointed as a board member of Persepolis F.C. and unsuccessfully ran for a seat in the City Council of Tehran in 2017.
