= Samiollah Hosseini Makarem =

Iranian politician

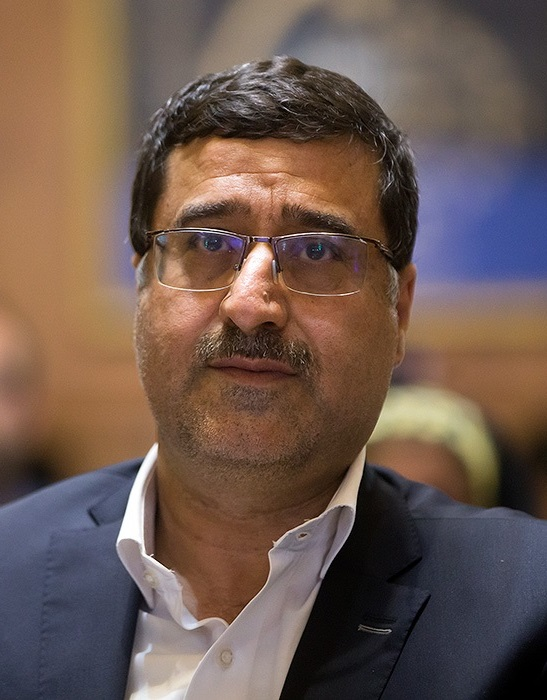
- Hosseini Makarem in 2018

Acting Mayor of Tehran
- In office 10 April 2018 – 16 May 2018
- Preceded by: Mohammad-Ali Najafi
- Succeeded by: Mohammad-Ali Afshani

Samiollah Hosseini Makarem (Persian: سمیع‌الله حسینی مکارم) is an Iranian politician who served as the acting mayor of Tehran in 2018.

== Acting mayor of Tehran ==
Makarem was elected acting mayor by the Islamic City Council of Tehran, with 14 out of 21 votes in favor, following Mohammad-Ali Najafi’s second resignation on April 10. Najafi had attempted to resign in mid-March after a video of him watching a girls dancing ritual, which offended Iranian clerics, was exposed. However, he maintained his official reason for wanting to resign was for health reasons.
