= Arsalan Khalatbari =

Iranian lawyer and politician (1904–1976)

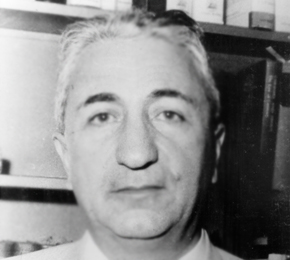
Amir Arsalan Khalatbari

Amir Arsalan Khalatbari Tonekaboni (Persian: امیر ارسلان خلعتبری تنکابنی; 1904–1976) was an Iranian lawyer, politician and a representative of the National Assembly and one of the founders of the Bar Association.

He served as governor of Gilan, and was succeeded in this post by Mohammad Ali Keshavarz Sadr.

== Party affiliation ==
Khalatbari was a member of the Iran Party from 1944 to 1945. He campaigned with Nosratollah Amini for Mossadegh's election at the time that the future prime minister had settled at Ferdows Garden and joined his National Front upon establishment, but left the organization in 1950.
