= Dobb-e Hardan =

Dobb-e Hardan دب حردان
- Village
- Location within Iran
- Coordinates: 31°18′15″N 48°30′04″E
- Country: Iran
- Province: Khuzestan
- County: Ahvaz
- Bakhsh: Central
- Rural District: Esmailiyeh

Population (2006)
  - Total: 1,060
- Time zone: UTC+3:30 (IRST)
  - Summer (DST): UTC+4:30 (IRDT)

Dobb-e Hardan (Persian: دب حردان, also Romanized as Dobb-e Ḩardān; also known as Daub al Hirdān, Dobb-e-Harvān, Doobé Hardan, Dowb-e Jerdān, Dūb Alḩerdān, Dūbb-e Ḩerdan, Dūbb-e Jerdān, Dūb-e Ḩardān, Dūb-e Ḩerdān, and Dūb-e Ḩervān) is a village in Esmailiyeh Rural District, in the Central District of Ahvaz County, Khuzestan Province, Iran. At the 2006 census, its population was 1,060, in 230 families.
