= Nasser Zolfaghari =

Iranian politician (c. 1913–2011)

- ناصر ذوالفقاری

Mayor of Tehran
- In office 1959–1960
- Monarch: Mohammad Reza Pahlavi

Member of Parliament
- In office 27 April 1952 – 16 August 1953
- Constituency: Zanjan
- In office 9 February 1950 – 19 February 1952
- Constituency: Zanjan
- In office 12 June 1947 – 28 July 1949
- Constituency: Zanjan

Personal details
- Born: 1914 Zanjan, Iran
- Died: 2011 (aged 96–97) Paris, France
- Resting place: Brompton Cemetery, London, United Kingdom
- Party: Democrat Party (1946–1948)
- Spouse: Shokouh-ol-Zaman Adl
- Relations: Mostafa Adl
- Children: Sakineh Golnar, Hossein
- Parent: Asadollah Khan Zolfaghari

Nasser Zolfaghari (Persian: ناصر ذوالفقاری; c. 1913 – 2011) was an Iranian politician, lawyer, and public administrator who served as Mayor of Tehran from 1959 to 1960 and as a three-term member of the Iranian National Assembly. He also held senior posts in the national government, including Vice Prime Minister and Minister without Portfolio (1960–1962). A widely respected public figure, Zolfaghari was known for his principled nationalism, personal integrity, and contributions to mid-20th-century political reform and urban modernization in Iran.

== Early life and education ==
Nasser Zolfaghari was born circa 1913 into a prominent landowning family in Zanjan, a historic city in northwestern Iran. The Zolfaghari family had long-standing ties to the region's political and economic elite, with substantial landholdings and influence in provincial governance during the late Qajar and early 20th-century constitutional periods. His father, Asadollah Khan Zolfaghari, was a notable figure in Zanjan's civic and tribal affairs, frequently mediating between central authorities and local constituencies.

Growing up in a household deeply engaged in political discourse and land management, Zolfaghari was exposed early on to questions of governance, justice, and rural administration. He received his primary and secondary education in Zanjan before moving to Tehran, where he enrolled at the newly established University of Tehran — Iran's premier institution of higher learning following its foundation in 1934. There, he pursued a degree in law, aligning with his family's tradition of civic service and political engagement.

Eager to continue his studies abroad, Zolfaghari traveled to France in the late 1930s, joining a generation of Iranian elites who sought Western education in administrative science and legal theory. He studied at institutions focused on public administration and comparative law, gaining exposure to European models of governance and statecraft. This experience would later shape his approach to both parliamentary politics and urban administration upon his return to Iran.

His education, straddling both Iranian and European intellectual traditions, placed him among a cohort of modernizing bureaucrats and landowners who sought to reconcile constitutionalism, local autonomy, and state centralization in the decades before the 1979 revolution.

== Political career ==
Zolfaghari began his public service in the Ministry of Agriculture and later joined the Ministry of Foreign Affairs. He rose to national prominence in the 1940s during Iran's confrontation with Soviet-backed separatist forces in Azerbaijan province. A New York Times report from 1946 describes how his brother, Mahmoud Zolfaghari, led tribal forces resisting the Democrat Party of Azerbaijan, which had declared autonomy under Soviet sponsorship. The Zolfaghari brothers played a significant role in defending Iran's territorial integrity during this critical period.

Nasser Zolfaghari was elected to the Majles (National Assembly) for the 15th (1947–49), 16th (1950–52), and 17th (1952–53) sessions, representing Zanjan. Although initially affiliated with Ahmad Qavam’s Democrat Party, he became increasingly independent in his positions. During the oil nationalization crisis of the early 1950s, Zolfaghari supported Prime Minister Mohammad Mossadegh's movement to reclaim Iran's petroleum sovereignty. According to contemporaneous New York Times coverage, Zolfaghari was a visible parliamentary presence during volatile debates on oil policy, known for his firm stance and refusal to engage in political theatrics.

== Mayor of Tehran (1959–1960) ==
Zolfaghari was appointed Mayor of Tehran in 1959 and served until late 1960. His tenure focused on urban modernization and administrative transparency, and he quickly became known for decisive, hands-on leadership. Though his tenure lasted only about 18 months, Zolfaghari left a notable imprint on Tehran's municipal administration. Major initiatives included:

- Recovering 50 million rials in unaccounted-for municipal revenues
- Clearing obstructions and improving traffic circulation on city streets
- Constructing the city's first public cold-storage facility for perishables
- Overseeing civic preparations for royal ceremonies and state visits

He emphasized the mayor's dual responsibility as both administrator and public servant, and he promoted municipal efficiency, fiscal discipline, and civic accountability. Foreign observers, including U.S. diplomatic cables and international press, took note of Zolfaghari's approach, viewing his appointment as part of a broader, albeit limited, liberalizing impulse within Iranian governance. His emphasis on anti-corruption and modernization was seen as aligned with public sentiment, even if ultimately constrained by structural limits on municipal autonomy.

Leaving office in late 1960, his tenure was remembered by many contemporaries as an active period of reform-oriented leadership in a city grappling with the challenges of demographic expansion, political volatility, and administrative inertia.

== Later Government Service ==
Following his tenure as Mayor of Tehran, Nasser Zolfaghari remained active in national political life, assuming senior roles in the executive branch. In the early 1960s, he was appointed Vice Prime Minister and Minister without Portfolio (1960–1962), serving under the cabinets of Manouchehr Eghbal (1957–1960) and Ali Amini (1961–1962). Though he did not oversee a specific ministry, Zolfaghari was involved in high-level policy coordination, with particular focus on administrative reform, rural development, and inter-ministerial oversight.

During this period, Iran entered a phase of ambitious state-led modernization efforts, including the reforms that would later be collectively known as the White Revolution. Zolfaghari expressed support for key elements of this agenda - such as land redistribution, educational expansion, and rural investment - emphasizing their potential to reduce inequality and foster national integration. However, he consistently advocated for institutional balance, warning against the unintended consequences of concentrated executive authority and opaque decision-making.

In cabinet discussions and private correspondence, Zolfaghari voiced concern over the growing autonomy of security and intelligence institutions, arguing that their activities must remain subject to legal scrutiny and democratic oversight. He is reported to have remarked, “Spies without checks become ghosts that haunt the system”- a reflection of his enduring belief in rule-based governance and the importance of transparency within the machinery of state.

Although he withdrew from official government roles by the mid-1960s, Zolfaghari remained an informal advisor in political and academic circles. He continued to promote a vision of reform grounded in institutional integrity, legal accountability, and measured modernization.

== Oral Testimony (1989) ==
In 1989, Nasser Zolfaghari participated in a series of oral history interviews conducted in Paris by the Foundation for Iranian Studies, as part of an archival initiative to preserve the recollections of major Iranian political and civic figures active during the mid-20th century.

Spanning five recorded sessions between May and October, these interviews provide a first-hand account of the social, political, and administrative developments that shaped modern Iran. During the interviews, Zolfaghari addressed a broad range of historical events and institutional transformations:

- Political developments in Iran during World War II and post-war Soviet influence;
- His parliamentary experiences during the oil nationalization era;
- A behind-the-scenes look at city planning and urban reform as Mayor of Tehran;
- Early state surveillance practices and the formation of SAVAK;
- Reflections on the promise and pitfalls of the White Revolution

These interviews remain an essential primary source for understanding Iran's institutional development, regional governance, and political culture in the 20th century. Zolfaghari's testimony captures the tensions between reform and tradition, centralization and provincial autonomy, and serves as a valuable narrative from a figure who was directly involved in many of the era's pivotal events. The complete transcripts are preserved by the Foundation for Iranian Studies and continue to inform scholarly work on Iran's modern political evolution.

== Personal Life and Family ==
Nasser Zolfaghari was married to Shokouh-ol-Zaman Adl, daughter of Mostafa Adl, a prominent Iranian jurist and diplomat who represented Iran at the League of Nations and United Nations, served as Ambassador of Iran to Switzerland (1935–39), and held the posts of Minister of Justice and Minister of Culture during the Pahlavi era.

Zolfaghari and his wife had two children: Sakineh Golnar and Hossein Zolfaghari, and three grandchildren: Ali Homayoun, Maryam Homayoun, and Haydeh Zolfaghari.

Following the 1979 Iranian Revolution, Zolfaghari relocated to Paris, where he lived until his passing in 2011.

== Legacy ==
Nasser Zolfaghari is recognized as a reform-oriented politician who integrated traditional social structures with modern administrative practices. Throughout his career - serving in the Majles, as Mayor of Tehran, and as a cabinet minister - his work focused on public service, national governance, and institutional development.

== Cultural Heritage ==
The Zolfaghari House (Zanjan), built by his father Asadollah Khan Zolfaghari in the late Qajar era, is now the Saltmen Museum, preserving both family legacy and ancient archaeological finds.
