= Mohammad Tavasoli =

Iranian politician

- محمد توسلی
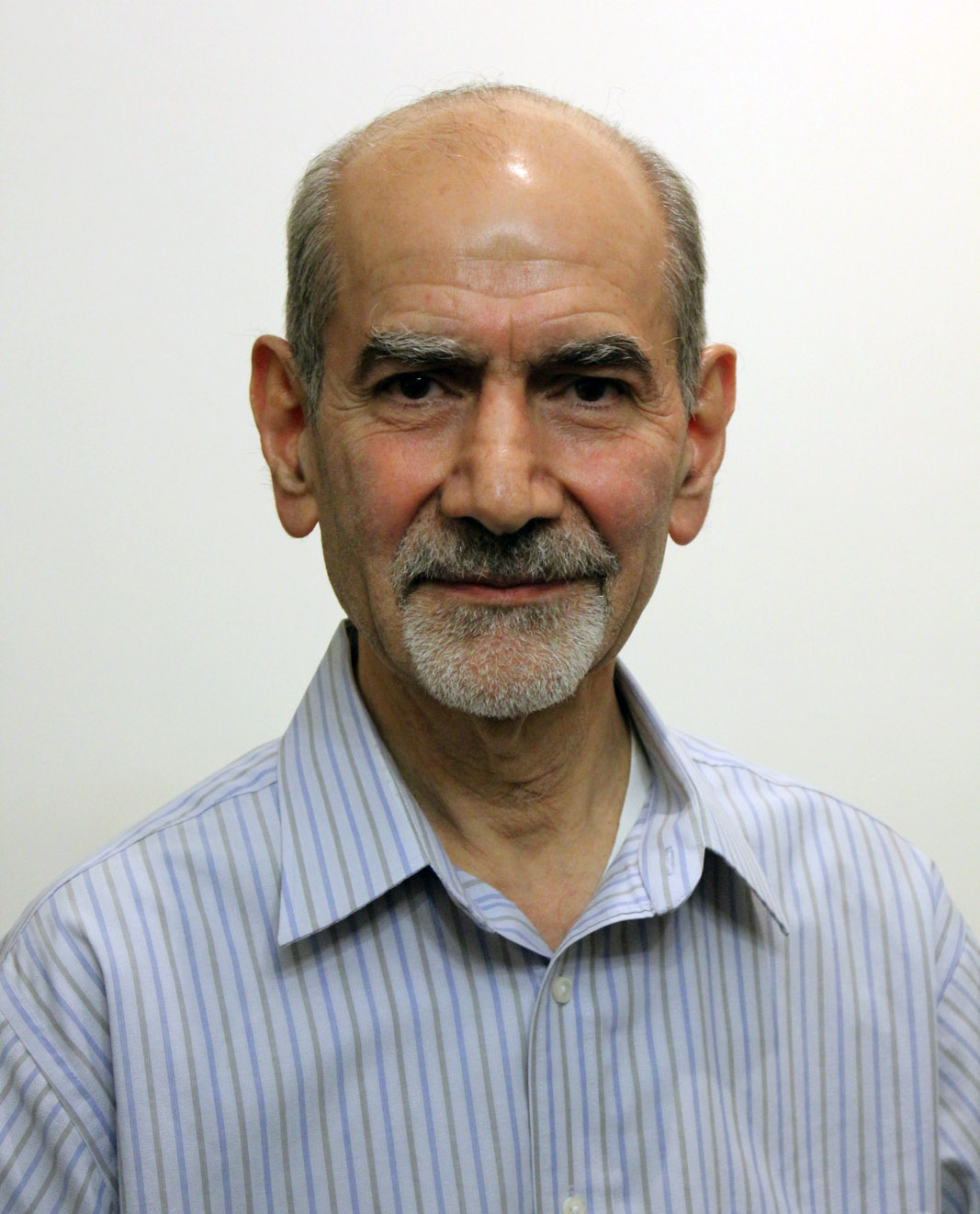
- Tavasoli in 2012

Mayor of Tehran
- In office 26 February 1979 – 5 January 1981
- Preceded by: Javad Shahrestani
- Succeeded by: Reza Zavare'i (Acting)

Personal details
- Born: Mohammad Tavasoli-Hojjati; 15 May 1938 (age 88) Tehran, Iran
- Party: Freedom Movement of Iran
- Spouse: Mina Yazdi
- Relatives: Ebrahim Yazdi (brother-in-law)
- Education: University of Tehran
- Profession: Engineer

Mohammad Tavasoli-Hojjati (Persian: محمد توسلی حجتی; born 15 May 1938) is an Iranian democracy activist and politician. He is the Secretary-General and also the director of the political office of the Freedom Movement party.

== Early life ==
Tavasoli studied at Tehran University in 1956 and was one of the members of Anjoman-e Eslami. He joined the freedom movement soon after it was established. He went to Germany in 1962 to study transportation and traffic. After visiting the United States in 1967, he was returned to Iran and banned from traveling. He was arrested in 1971 because he helped a member of MEK and was jailed for one year. Before the Iranian Revolution, he was one of the staff responsible for the advertising campaign rally to welcome Ruhollah Khomeini back to Iran after 15 years.

== Political career ==
After the Iranian Revolution, he was elected as Mayor of Tehran. He was mayor from February 1979 until February 1980.

He was jailed with Hashem Sabbaghian in 1983 but was released seven months later, again in March 1988 and then after the 2009-2010 Iranian election protests after participating in a rally in June 2009.

Civic offices
| Preceded by Javad Shahrestani | Mayor of Tehran; 1979–1981 | Succeeded by Reza Zavarei |
Party political offices
| Preceded by Ebrahim Yazdi | Secretary-General of the Freedom Movement of Iran; 2017–present | Incumbent |
| Preceded by Ebrahim Yazdi | Head of Political Bureau of Freedom Movement of Iran; 1995–present | Incumbent |
| New title | Head of Political Bureau of Freedom Movement of Iran; 1978 | Succeeded by Abbas Amir-Entezam |
