= Gegham Saryan =

Armenian poet and translator

Gegham Baghdasaryan (Armenian: Գեղամ Բաղդասարի Բաղդասարյան, December 25, 1902, Tabriz – November 14, 1976, Yerevan) better known by his pen name Gegham Saryan (Armenian: Գեղամ Սարյան) was an Armenian poet and translator. In 1922, he immigrated to Armenia. Saryan published more than 40 poetry books
