= Mohammad-Reza Mahdavi Kani =

Iranian Ayatollah (1931–2014)

Ayatollah Mohammad-Reza Mahdavi Kani
- محمدرضا مهدوی کنی
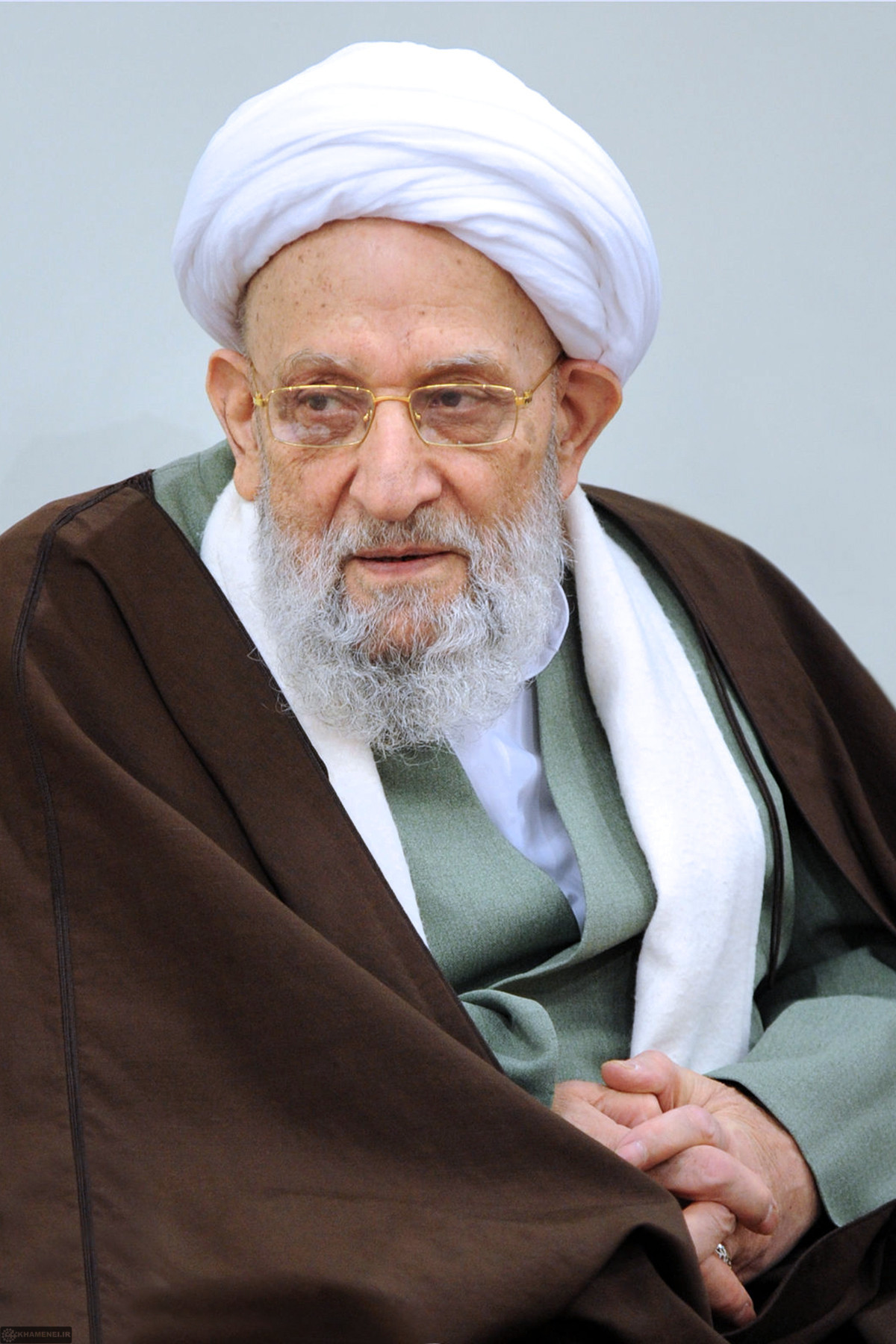

Chairman of the Assembly of Experts
- In office 8 March 2011 – 21 October 2014
- Supreme Leader: Ali Khamenei
- Preceded by: Akbar Hashemi Rafsanjani
- Succeeded by: Mahmoud Shahroudi

Prime Minister of Iran
- In office 2 September 1981 – 29 October 1981
- Supreme Leader: Ruhollah Khomeini
- President: Ali Khamenei
- Preceded by: Mohammad-Javad Bahonar
- Succeeded by: Mir-Hossein Mousavi

Minister of Interior
- In office 10 September 1980 – 3 September 1981; Acting: 27 February 1980 – 10 September 1980
- President: Abolhassan Banisadr; Mohammad-Ali Rajai
- Prime Minister: Mohammad-Ali Rajai; Mohammad-Javad Bahonar
- Preceded by: Akbar Hashemi Rafsanjani (acting)
- Succeeded by: Kamaleddin Nikravesh

Secretary of the Guardian Council Acting
- In office 22 July 1980 – 17 December 1980
- Appointed by: Ruhollah Khomeini
- Preceded by: Position established
- Succeeded by: Lotfollah Safi Golpaygani

Personal details
- Born: Mohammad-Reza Haj-Bagheri; 6 August 1931 Kan District, Tehran, Imperial State of Persia
- Died: 21 October 2014 (aged 83) Tehran, Islamic Republic of Iran
- Resting place: Shah Abdol-Azim Shrine
- Party: Combatant Clergy Association
- Spouse: Nesa Khaton Sorkhei (m. 1960)
- Children: 3
- Relatives: Mohammad-Bagher Bagheri Kani (brother); Ali Bagheri Kani (nephew)
- Education: Qom Seminary
- Website: mahdavikani.ir

Military service
- Allegiance: Iran
- Years of service: 1979–1982
- Commands: Revolutionary Committees

Mohammad-Reza Mahdavi Kani (Persian: محمدرضا مهدوی کنی, 6 August 1931 – 21 October 2014) was an Iranian Shia cleric, writer and conservative and principlist politician who was Prime Minister of Iran from 2 September until 29 October 1981. Before that, he was Minister of Interior in the cabinets of Mohammad-Ali Rajai and Mohammad-Javad Bahonar. He was the leader of Combatant Clergy Association and Chairman of the Assembly of Experts and also founder and president of Imam Sadiq University.

== Early life ==
Mahdavi Kani was born on 6 August 1931 in the village of Kan, near Tehran. His father was an Ayatollah and taught in the Mofid School. After he finished basic education in Kan, he studied at Borhan High School in Tehran. He left for Qom in 1947 to study at a religious seminary. His teachers included Ayatollah Ruhollah Khomeini, Nematollah Salehi Najafabadi, Grand Ayatollah Seyyed Mohammad-Reza Golpayegani, Grand Ayatollah Seyyed Hossein Boroujerdi and Allameh Sayyed Muhammad Husayn Tabatabaei.

He came back to Tehran in 1961 to teach religious sciences. In that time, most clerics participated in protests against Shah Mohammad Reza Pahlavi. Mahdavi Kani joined these clerics and formed an alliance with Ayatollah Khomeini. He also was imprisoned by Shah three times.

== Career ==
After the demise of Ayatollah Boroujerdi, Mahdavi Kani went back to Tehran and continued his struggle against the Pahlavi regime, something which he had started since he was 18, during the time of Ayatollah Boroujerdi. He was considerably active and effective in his participation in the Islamic movement of Iran led by Khomeini. Before the Islamic Revolution, he was appointed by Khomeini to the Revolutionary Council and later took up various political and religious positions. He was the leader of the Combatant Clergy Association, which he cofounded in 1977. Mahdavi Kani refused to join Islamic Republican Party in 1979, because he believed clerics should remain non-partisan.

He was appointed chief of the Central Provisional Komiteh for the Islamic Revolution that was a body in charge of trials and executions of the civil and military officials of the Pahlavi era.

He served as the minister of interior in the cabinet of Mohammad-Ali Rajai to succeeding Akbar Hashemi Rafsanjani. He was reappointed as minister of interior in the cabinet of Mohammad-Javad Bahonar. He became the interim prime minister on 2 September 1981 and was in office until 29 October 1981. He was also chairman of provisional presidential council, after the assassination of president Mohammad Ali Rajai and prime minister Mohammad Javad Bahonar. He has also been a member of the Constitutional Amendment Council of Iran, appointed by Ayatollah Khomeini, the Supreme Leader of Iran, to review and amend the Constitution of Iran in 1989. He was also elected as member of the assembly in 2008 in a by-election from Tehran.

Mahdavi Kani is the founder and former head of Imam Sadiq University in Tehran, a university specializing in humanities.

He was elected as chairman of the Assembly of Experts on 8 March 2011 after Ali Akbar Hashemi Rafsanjani resigned from office. In March 2013, he was reelected to the post for further two years.

== Illness and death ==
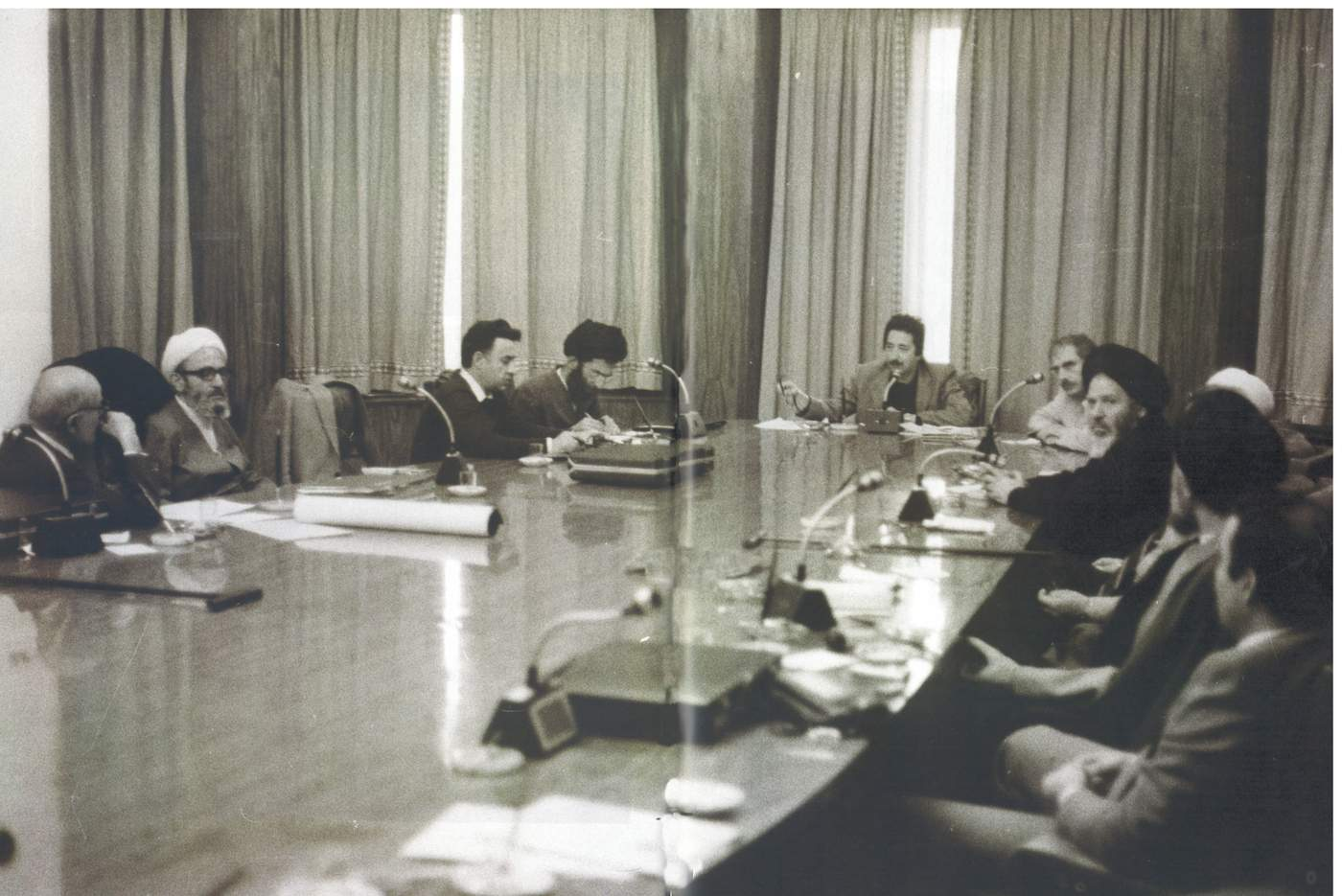
Kani (second from left) in a meeting of the Interim Government, 1980

Mahdavi Kani was hospitalized for a stroke on Ruhollah Khomeini's death anniversary, which brought him to coma on 4 June 2014. He was in coma for more than five months and died on 21 October 2014 at the age of 83. Mahdavi Kani was survived by his three children, eight grandchildren and two great-grandchildren. Hours after Mahdavi Kani's death, his office announced that his state funeral will be held on 23 October and his body will be buried at Shah-Abdol-Azim shrine. Iranian President Hassan Rouhani also announced two days of mourning in his memorial.

== Works ==
The following works of Mohammad-Reza Mahdavi Kani are published:

- The Beginning Points in Practical Ethics
- The Book of Beest goftar (20 Discourses)
- Starting Points in Practical Logic
- The Basics and Principles of Islamic Economy in Holy Koran
- The Explanation of Iftitah Prayer

== See also ==
- Interim government of Iran, 1981
- List of ayatollahs
- List of members in the Fourth Term of the Council of Experts

Political offices
Preceded by Ali Akbar Hashemi Rafsanjani (acting)	Minister of Interior; 1980–1981	Succeeded by Kamaleddin Nikravesh
Preceded by Mohammad-Javad Bahonar	Prime Minister of Iran; 1981	Succeeded by Mir-Hossein Mousavi
Preceded by Ali Akbar Hashemi Rafsanjani	Chairman of the Assembly of Experts; 2011–2014	Succeeded by Mahmoud Hashemi Shahroudi; Acting
Party political offices
Preceded by Fazlollah Mahallati	Secretary-General of Combatant Clergy Association; 1981–2014	Succeeded by Ali Movahedi-Kermani
Academic offices
Preceded by Hussein-Ali Montazeri	President of Imam Sadiq University; 1983–2014	Succeeded by Mohammad-Saeed Mahdavi Kani
