= Nosratollah Amini =

Iranian lawyer (1915–2009)

Governor of Fars province
- In office 1979
- Appointed by: Mehdi Bazargan

Mayor of Tehran
- In office 1952–1953

Personal details
- Born: 1915 Arak, Sublime State of Iran
- Died: 20 April 2009 (aged 93–94) Woodbridge, Virginia, U.S.
- Cause of death: Pneumonia
- Party: National Front
- Spouse: Nahid
- Children: 4 sons and 1 daughter

Nosratollah Amini (Persian: نصرت‌الله امینی; 1915–2009) was an Iranian lawyer and politician. He served as the mayor of Tehran between 1952 and 1953, and after the Iranian revolution briefly held office as the governor of Fars province.

== Life ==
Amini was born in 1915, in Arak to Ghamar Amini and her first husband but they divorced when Amini was young.

Through his mothers remarriage to Seyyed Mohammad Sadr Mahallati, Amini had several half-sisters one of them being the artist Behjat Sadr.

== Career ==
Amini was personal attorney of Mohammad Mossadegh.

== Marriage ==
Married Nahideh Atai in 1945 and had issue. The wedding ceremony was conducted by Ayatollah Khomeini.
