= Ahmad Aram =

Iranian writer, translator and teacher

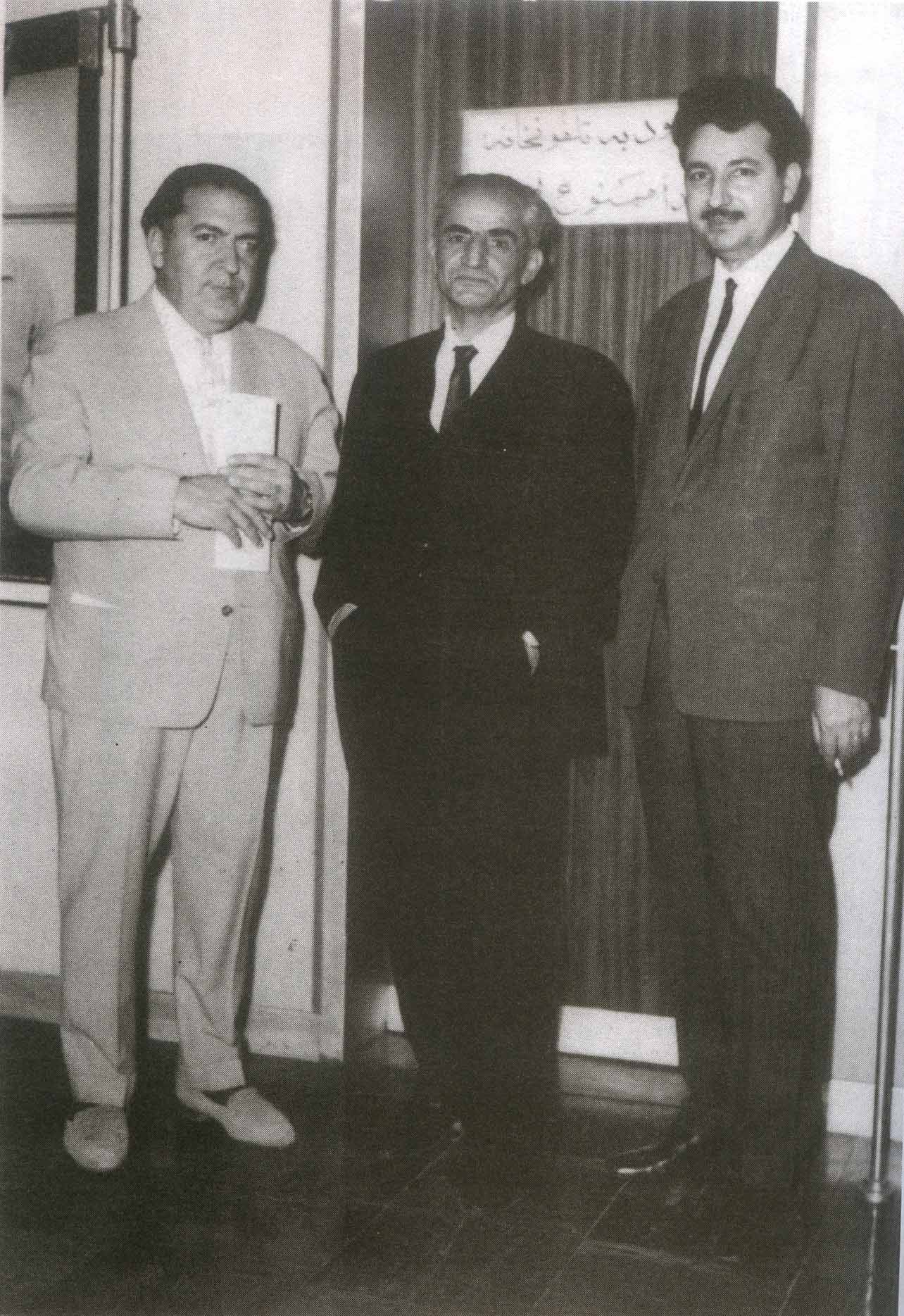
- From right to left: Parviz Shahriyari, Ahmad Aram, and Bagheri Emami at the ceremony commemorating the twenty-fifth year of the publication of Sokhan (Speech) magazine
- Born: March 28, 1902; Tehran, Iran
- Died: April 4, 1998 (aged 96); United States
- Resting place: Artists section in Behesht-e Zahra
- Education: Dar ul-Funun (Persia)
- Occupations: Teacher, translator, writer, encyclopedist
- Known for: The initiator of writing modern textbooks in Iran, with more than 200 translations and authorships
- Political party: Tudeh Party of Iran

Ahmad Aram (Persian: احمد آرام; March 28, 1902, Tehran, Iran – April 4, 1998, United States) was a translator, a member of the Maktab-e-Metāʿ (Metāʿ School), and a contemporary writer. He contributed to the compilation of Dāʾerat al-Maʿāref-e Fārsi and won the first prize in the first cycle of the Iran Book of the Year for translating the book Al-Hayat under the title ترجمهٔ الحیاة (Translation of Al-Hayat).

== Biography ==
Ahmad Aram was born on March 28, 1902, in the Chaleh-Meydan neighborhood of Tehran. After completing high school at Darolfonoon, in 1925, he began teaching physics and chemistry. He realized that experimental lessons were being taught theoretically and without laboratory activities. Taking the initiative, he published a book titled "New Year's Gift," a collection of physical and chemical experiments. "New Year's Gift" was the first educational book on laboratory work, including physics and chemistry experiments, which Aram authored in February 1926.

Ahmad Aram then pursued a degree in law, but after a while, he abandoned it and turned to medicine. However, this did not hold his interest for long either. In the last year of medical school, he left it and engaged in cultural activities and translation. Alongside Dr. Nasiri, he is one of the founders of the authoring of textbooks in Iran and was active as the Deputy Minister of Education in the 1950s.

Ahmad Aram was one of the first authors of textbooks and educational books who, both independently and with the help of others, authored physics and chemistry high school textbooks. Due to his admiration for Amir Kabir, he named his series of books "Amir Series." Until around 1952, Ahmad Aram wrote nearly forty educational and instructional books.

Ahmad Aram is one of the most prolific contemporary translators, translating over one hundred and forty works from English, French, and Arabic. In his translations, he paid attention to finding suitable Persian equivalents for foreign words and avoided using foreign terminology and words. He himself says about this:

I have translated a medical book that is about 1200 pages, and I have tried not to use a single foreign word. Of course, it is a very challenging task, but I have done it.

== Death ==
Ahmad Aram died on April 4, 1998, in the United States and was buried in a ceremony on April 22, after being transferred to Tehran. He was also selected as one of the lasting figures in 2013.
