= Religious-Nationalists =

Iranian political faction that embraces nationalism and Islam

The Religious–Nationalists (plural form in Persian: ملّی‌مذهبی‌ها, romanized: Melli–Mazhabi ha, lit. 'The Nationalist–Religious Ones') or the National–Religious (Persian: ملّی‌مذهبی, romanized: Melli–Mazhabi as an adjective) are terms referring to a political faction in Iran that consists of individuals and groups embracing Iranian nationalism and Islam, as an integral part of their manifesto. They self-identify as political followers of Mohammad Mosaddegh and their modernist religious outlook makes them advocates of coexistence of Islam and democracy, an idea distinguishable from those of ideologies such as Pan-Islamism or Islamism.

The political lineage of this faction is traced back to the 1940s while its adherents have been off power with the exception of a brief period after the Iranian Revolution in 1979, during which the Interim Government of Iran was led by Mehdi Bazargan. Having opposed the rule of both Pahlavi dynasty and the current Islamic Republic system, they have for long sought democracy in Iran through reformism –rather than revolutionary means– albeit their aspirations of being accepted as the loyal opposition by the establishment have been fruitless. As a result, the groups within this faction have been outlawed and prosecuted throughout much of their history.

== History ==
=== Pre-revolutionary era (1940–1979) ===
The political lineage of the faction is traced back to the 1940s. The first political organization of Muslim intellectuals in Iran was the Movement of God-Worshipping Socialists (MGWS), which was founded in 1943 and influenced a series of other socialist groupings in the next years to come. The MGWS was merged into the nationalist Iran Party, but later split from the party to form the Society for the Liberation of the People of Iran and became affiliated with the original National Front, an alliance of different groups on a wide range of political spectrum founded in 1949 by Mohammad Mosaddegh. Other Muslim intelligentsia who worked with the Front to help nationalization of the Iranian oil industry, were not socialists in the traditional sense of the term but instead were instead proponents of liberalism.

After the British-American coup d'état in 1953 up until 1961, they were active members of the National Resistance Movement and then the National Front (II), and gained a large following among religious masses by publishing books on Islam with a modernist view.

In 1961, religious elements of the Front founded the Freedom Movement of Iran (FMI) with the blessings of Mosaddegh who was under house arrest. After the 1963 demonstrations in Iran, the leading FMI members were arrested and imprisoned. During the trials, FMI leader Mehdi Bazargan precisely predicted that they are "the last legal opposition" to the establishment. Bulk of the FMI members were exiled and became politically active abroad against the government, with younger generations founding the People's Mujahedin of Iran. After FMI members were gradually released from prison, they resumed mostly intellectual activities until the Iranian Revolution in 1979. In the meantime, other groups such as JAMA and the Movement of Militant Muslims were formed as successors to the left-wing MGWS.

=== Post-revolutionary era (since 1979) ===
Historian Ervand Abrahamian identifies six distinguishable political factions that emerged in the immediate aftermath of the Iranian Revolution, including "lay-religious liberals" represented by Bazargan. Allied with "secular liberals", the faction wanted to replace the old government with a pluralistic and secular democratic republic, but both were sidelined by Khomeinist "clerical populists" who seized the power. According to him:

Fearful of replacing the monarchy with either anarchy or theocracy, they hoped to demolish the old order 'step by step’ and erect a republic that would keep intact the main state institutions, especially the army and the bureaucracy, and would be Islamic in form but secular and democratic in content. Inspired by nationalism as well as Shiism, they used patriotic symbols as much as religious ones, dreamed not of exporting the revolution but of modernizing the country, and feared not so much alien cultural influences as predatory neighbours, in particular Iraq. Thus they were reluctant to break off all political, technical and military links with the United States. And apprehensive of all forms of autocracy, these liberals hoped to set up a state that would not weigh too heavily on society, especially in economic matters, and would tolerate political diversity. It was not clear, however, whether they were willing to extend this toleration to include radicals advocating the establishment of a new social order.

After the Khomeinists consolidated power in the early 1980s, they politically marginalized and suppressed the Nationalist-Religious tendency. Despite prosecutions, the faction continued to exist and was tolerated by Khomeini's government. During the 1980s, Bazargan and his associates were constantly harassed but they issued several proclamations criticizing Guardianship of the Islamic Jurist and government policies on Iran–Iraq war. After 1997 Iranian presidential election, they joined the reformists in supporting President Mohammad Khatami and started to gain more public following. According to Hamid Dabashi, they became the "dominant discourse of the most successful material constitution of political uprising against the conservatives in Iran".

== Associated groups and individuals ==
The camp consists of political organizations such as the Freedom Movement of Iran (FMI), the Council of Nationalist-Religious Activists and the Women's Society of Islamic Revolution, as well as individuals who are either independent or are considered remnants of groups like the Movement of Militant Muslims, the People's Mojahedin Movement of Iran and the JAMA.

Political groups that were not parties in traditional sense, and whose membership included people with this orientation in whole or partially include:

- Iranian Committee for the Defense of Freedom and Human Rights, a pro-human rights organization founded in 1977 and disbanded in 1980
- Eponym Group, an electoral list of Religious-Nationalists for the parliamentary elections in 1980
- Association for Defense of Freedom and the Sovereignty of the Iranian Nation, an organization active between 1986 and 1990
- Front for Democracy and Human Rights, an alliance of Religious-Nationalists with the reformists set up in 2005
- National Council for Peace, anti-war organization founded in 2007

=== Non-political organizations ===
The forerunner of non-political organizations whose membership had National-Religious thoughts was the Focality of Islam, founded in 1941 by Mahmoud Taleghani. Based in Tehran, it was dedicated to study and teach Quran in a nontraditional fashion. A similar organization was founded in 1946 by Mohammad-Taghi Shariai in Mashhad, named the Center for the Propagation of Islamic Truths. Young members of these two organizations who entered university, made up the nucleus that established the Islamic Association of Students (IAS) at the University of Tehran in 1941, and at the University of Mashhad in 1949. The main patron of the former was Mehdi Bazargan, whose activities at the time were focused on anti-communist agenda. Similar organizations were founded at the Shiraz University and the University of Tabriz and soon they expanded all over the country, leading to formation of an umbrella organization which held its second national congress in 1962. After these students were graduated, they established a series of similar professional associations for teachers, doctors and engineers.

According to Hamid Algar, "the intellectual impact of all this activity was considerable; it can be said that the associations laid the foundations of the modern Islamic movement in Iran".

In 1959, Sadegh Ghotbzadeh founded the first of such student-run Islamic organization abroad in Washington, D.C. In 1963, students who sympathized with the FMI and studied in the North America, founded the Islamic Students' Association of America and Canada, a student-run organization which was incorporated into the Muslim Students' Association (MSA). While the former was officially a subordinate of the latter, it maintained autonomy and called itself the 'Persian-speaking group' of MSA. In 1978, the organization left the MSA but retained the name 'Muslim Students' Association (Persian-Speaking Group)'.

During the late 1990s and the early 2000s, one of the three internal factions within the Office for Strengthening Unity named ferāksīun-e rowšangarī (lit. 'enlightened faction'), were regarded sympathetic towards this political camp.

After 1979, a number of organizations dedicated to spread the thoughts and works of Ali Shariati were established. Bureau for the Diffusion of Shariati's Ideas (daftar-e našr-e aqāyed-e šarīatī) which was coordinated by Mohammad-Taghi Shariai, was closed down by the authorities in the late 1980s. Another organization named Dr. Ali Shariati Cultural Researches Bureau (daftar-e pažuḥeš-hāye farḥangī-ye doktor alī-ye šarīatī), was founded by Hasan Yousefi Eshkevari in 1996 and started working the next year but was forcibly shut down in 2001. Shariati Cultural Foundation (bonyad-e farhangī-ye šarīatī) is run by Shariati family and remains active.

=== Media ===
Prominent print media that have been published legally and belong to the faction include:

- Dānešāmūz (1940s), periodical published by the Focality of Islam
- Ganǰ-e šāygān (1950s–1960s), periodical published by Islamic associations
- Mizan (1980–1981), official daily of the FMI
- Iran-e-Farda (1992–2000; 2014–2020), magazine published by Ezzatollah Sahabi
- Payam-e-Hajar (1979–2000), succeeded by Payam-e-Ebrahim (2014–2019), magazines published by Azam Taleghani
- Cheshmandaz-e Iran (1999–resent), bi-monthly magazine published by Lotfollah Meisami
- Nameh (2004–2006), monthly magazine published by Keyvan Samimi
- melimazhabi.com, a news website close to the faction

== Ideology ==
The National-Religious discourse is based on two pillars: īrānīyyat (lit. 'Iranian-ness') and eslāmīyyat (lit. 'Islamic-ness'). Through this platform, Islamic and nationalist values reconcile and it is argued that religion and modernism can coexist. A broad spectrum of thoughts are gathered under this umbrella term and subsequently they disagree among themselves about various issues. While some lean towards left-wing politics and are described as social democrat or Islamic socialist, some others are proponents of economic liberalism and market economy and are considered Islamic liberals. A common ground among the camp is that they are strictly non-violent and favor gradual sociopolitical changes instead of revolutionary objectives.

Matthijs van den Bos observed that by 2002, university students associated with National-Religious orientation were disillusioned with state religion but had a quest for what he calls "political mysticism", as they used the slogan āzādī, barābarī, ʾerfān (lit. 'Liberty, Equality, Gnosis').

has been enjoying "high intellectual status" among Iranian public opinion.
