= Interim Government of Iran (1979–80) =

Government of Iran from November 1979 to July 1980

Interim Government of Iran (1979-80)
- Interim Cabinet of the Islamic Republic of Iran

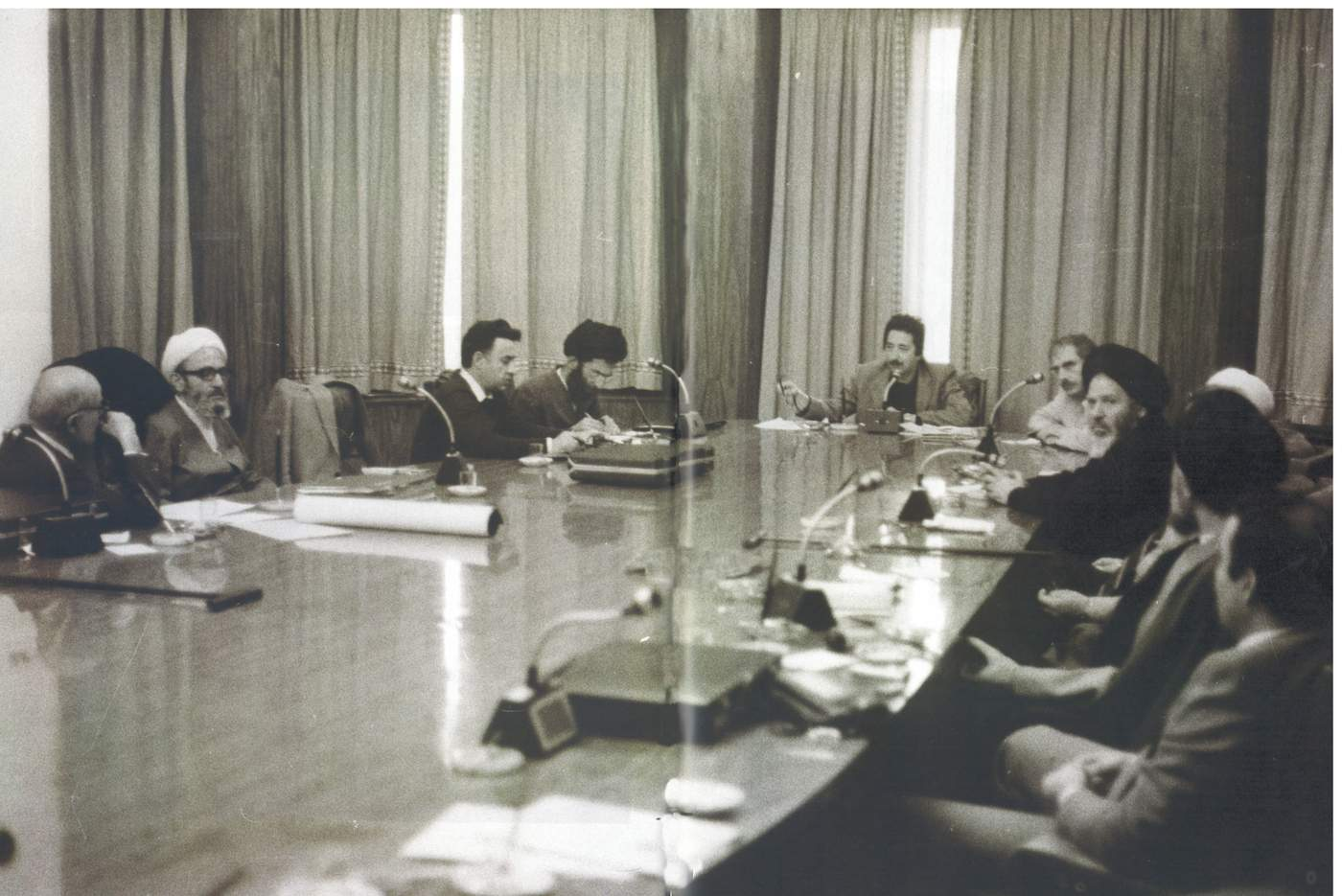
- A meeting of the council (1980)
- Date formed: 6 November 1979
- Date dissolved: 20 July 1980

People and organisations
- Head of state: Rouhollah Khomeini
- Head of government: List: Mohammad Beheshti (as 1st Secretary); Abolhassan Banisadr (as Chairman)
- Head of government's history: Beheshti: Vice Chairman of Constituent Assembly (1979); Banisadr: Vice Minister of Finance (1979)
- Deputy head of government: Ali Akbar Moinfar (as 2nd Secretary)
- No. of ministers: 17
- Status in legislature: Council of the Islamic Revolution

History
- Predecessor: Cabinet of Mehdi Bazargan
- Successor: Rajai cabinet

The Council of the Islamic Revolution formed the Interim Government on Ruhollah Khomeini's request after the resignation of Mehdi Bazargan because of the Iran hostage crisis happening at the time.

According to Ali Akbar Moinfar, Council of the Islamic Revolution chaired by Mohammad Beheshti as First Secretary until Abolhassan Banisadr elected as President of Iran. Banisadr was made head of the Revolutionary Council on 7 February 1980.

== Cabinet ==
Portfolio	Minister	Took office	Left office	Party
Head of Council	Mohammad Beheshti	6 November 1979	7 February 1980	IRP
Head of Council	Abolhassan Banisadr	7 February 1980	11 August 1980	Nonpartisan
Spokesperson	Hassan Habibi	7 November 1979	11 August 1980	IRP
Ministers
Minister of Agriculture	Abbas Sheibani	17 November 1979	10 September 1980	IRP
Minister of Commerce	Reza Sadr	7 November 1979	10 September 1980	FMI
Minister of Education	Mohammad-Ali Rajai	7 November 1979	10 September 1980	IATI
Minister of Energy	Hassan Abbaspour	17 November 1979	10 September 1980	IRP
Minister of Foreign Affairs	Abolhassan Banisadr (head of ministry)	17 November 1979	29 November 1979	Nonpartisan
Minister of Foreign Affairs	Sadegh Ghotbzadeh	29 November 1979	10 September 1980	Nonpartisan
Minister of Finance	Abolhassan Banisadr	17 November 1979	10 February 1980	Nonpartisan
Minister of Finance	Reza Salimi (head of ministry)	10 February 1980	10 September 1980	Nonpartisan
Minister of Health	Moussa Zargar	17 November 1979	June 1980	IRP
Minister of Health	Iradj Fazel (head of ministry)	June 1980	10 September 1980	Nonpartisan
Minister of Higher Education	Hassan Habibi	7 November 1979	10 September 1980	IRP
Minister of Housing	Seyyed Mohsen Yahyavi	17 November 1979	10 September 1980	IRP
Minister of Industries and Mines	Mahmoud Ahmadzadeh	7 November 1979	10 September 1980	FMI
Minister of Interior	Akbar Hashemi Rafsanjani (head of ministry)	17 November 1979	27 February 1980	IRP
Minister of Interior	Mohammad-Reza Mahdavi Kani (head of ministry)	27 February 1980	10 September 1980	CCA
Minister of Labor	Mohammad Reza Nematzadeh	17 November 1979	10 September 1980	IRP
Minister of National Defence	Mostafa Chamran	7 November 1979	10 September 1980	FMI
Minister of National Guidance	Nasser Minachi	7 November 1979	10 September 1980	Nonpartisan
Minister of Petroleum	Ali Akbar Moinfar	7 November 1979	10 September 1980	IAE
Minister of Post and Telegraph	Mahmoud Ghandi	28 November 1979	10 September 1980	IRP
Minister of Roads	Yousef Taheri Qazvini	7 November 1979	January 1980	IAE
Minister of Roads	Mousa Kalantari (head of ministry)	January 1980	10 September 1980	IRP
Minister without portfolio	Dariush Forouhar	7 November 1979	16 March 1980	NPI
Minister without portfolio for Plan and Budget	Ezzatollah Sahabi	7 November 1979	20 July 1980	FMI
Cabinet-level officials
Endowment Organization	Habibollah Asgaroladi	7 November 1979	11 August 1980	IRP
Department of Environment	Taghi Ebtekar	7 November 1979	11 August 1980	Nonpartisan
Physical Education Organization	Hossein Shah-Hosseini	7 November 1979	11 August 1980	NF
Recruitment Organization	Mostafa Katiraei	7 November 1979	11 August 1980	IAE
* Acting

== See also ==
- Interim Government of Iran
- Council of the Islamic Revolution

Cabinet of Iran
Preceded by Cabinet of Bazargan	Interim Cabinet of Revolutionary Council; 1979–1980	Succeeded by Cabinet of Rajai
