= Ahmad Sayyed Javadi =

Iranian politician (1917–2013)

- احمد صدر حاج‌سیدجوادی
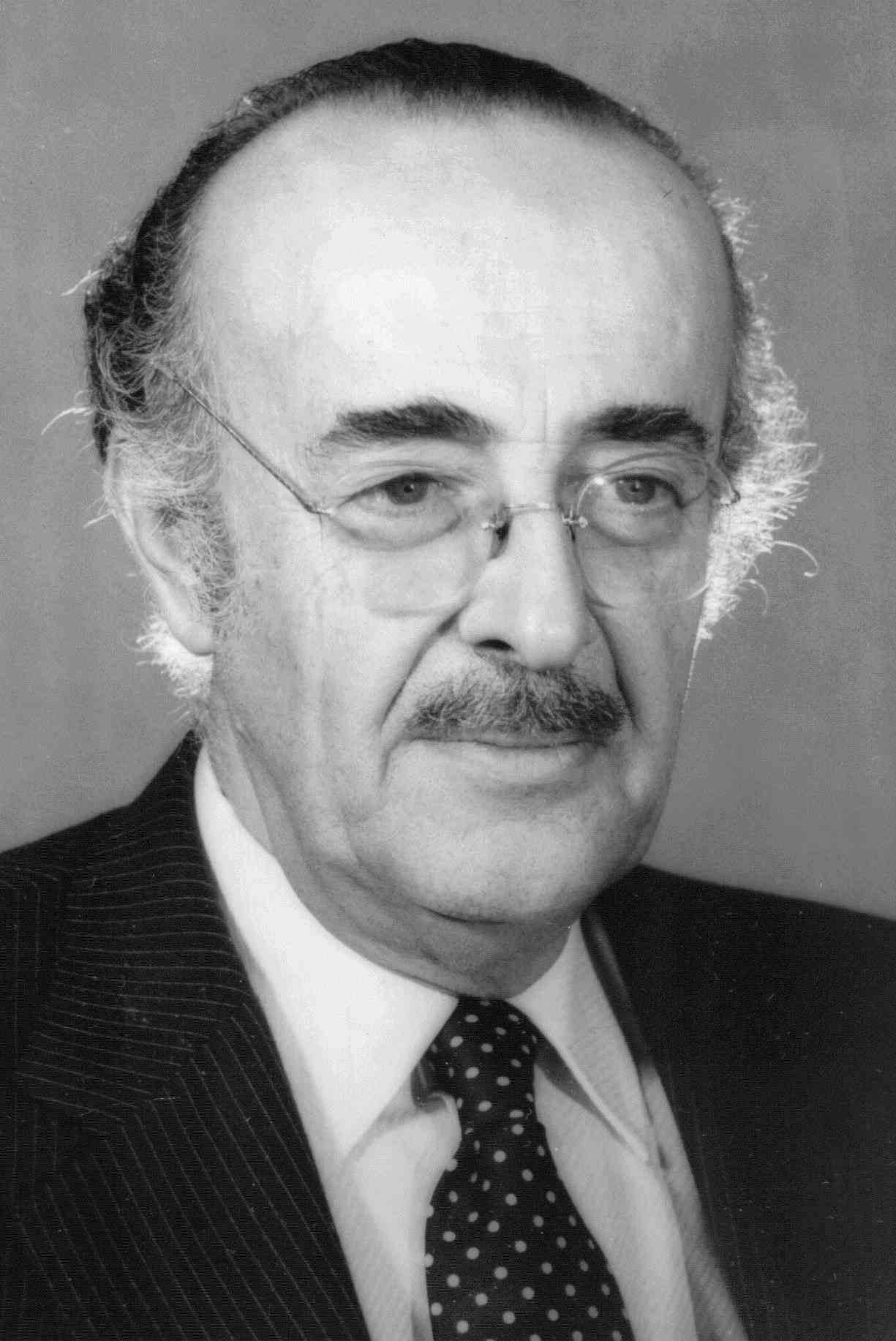

Member of the Parliament of Iran
- In office 28 May 1980 – 28 May 1984
- Constituency: Qazvin
- Majority: 100,717 (53.40%)

Minister of Interior
- In office 13 February 1979 – 20 June 1979
- Prime Minister: Mehdi Bazargan
- Preceded by: Shapour Bakhtiar
- Succeeded by: Hashem Sabbaghian

Minister of Justice
- In office 20 June 1979 – 6 November 1979
- Prime Minister: Mehdi Bazargan
- Preceded by: Assodollah Mobasheri
- Succeeded by: Mohammad Beheshti (committee observer)

Personal details
- Born: Ahmad Sadr Haj Seyyed Javadi; 24 June 1917 Qazvin, Qajar Iran
- Died: 31 March 2013 (aged 95) Tehran, Iran
- Party: Freedom Movement of Iran
- Relatives: Asghar Sayyed Javadi (brother)

Ahmad Sayyed Javadi (Persian: احمد صدر حاج‌سیدجوادی; 24 June 1917 – 31 March 2013) was an Iranian lawyer, political activist and politician, who served as interior minister and justice minister. He was the first interior minister after the 1979 revolution in Iran.

== Early life and education ==
Javadi was born into a devoutly religious family in Qazvin on 24 June 1917. The members of his family were Shiite clergy and merchants. He received a law degree and a PhD in political science.

Javadi was the eldest of three brothers. One of his brothers, Ali, was a journalist who worked for Kayhan newspaper. Another, Hassan, was also a journalist who served as the editor-in-chief of the daily newspaper Ettelaat. He was the cousin of Ziaeddin Haj Sayyed Javadi, who was a member of the Majlis during the premiership of Mohammad Mosaddegh.

== Career and political activities ==
Javadi, along with Mehdi Bazargan, Yadollah Sahabi and Ayatollah Mahmoud Taleghani, founded the Liberation Movement (LMI; Nehzat-e-Azad-e-Iran) in 1961. He was appointed prosecutor of Tehran when Ali Amini was prime minister in 1961, and served for eighteen months. During the time in the office, he joined the anti-corruption judicial activism led by Noureddin Alamouti.

When the LMI was banned, Javadi became a member of the opposition group against Shah Mohammad Reza Pahlavi. Following the Six-Day War in 1967, Javadi was one of the critics of Israel. In 1968, he stated "piety and spirituality have left our society. Instead our hearts have been filled with fear and darkness. We must struggle for justice and attempt to build a society that is modelled after madinah-ye fazeleh [the prelude to the ideal unitarian classless Islamic society]." This view was the common sentiment among Muslim intellectuals of the period in Iran. For Javadi, the solution to the problems experienced in Iranian society was the creation of an Islamic society.

In 1977, Javadi was among the members and founders of the newly formed Iranian Committee for the Defense of Freedom and Human Rights. He was also one of the lawyers of Mahmoud Taleghani together with Hasan Nazih in 1977. He also defended Ali Khamenei, Ali Shariati, and Hossein Ali Montazeri during the Pahlavi era.

Following the 1979 revolution, Javadi contributed to the draft of the Constitution of the Islamic Republic. He was a member of the revolutionary council and of the Islamic legislative assembly. He served as the Qazvin representative at the first Majlis from 1980 to 1984. Javadi was appointed minister of interior to the interim government of Prime Minister Mehdi Bazargan. He was in office as interior minister from 13 February 1979 to June 1979. He was succeeded by Hashem Sabbaghian in the post. In June 1979, Javadi was appointed justice minister when Assadollah Mobashery was resigned from the post. Javadi's tenure lasted until November 1979 when the interim government resigned.

Javadi was cofounder of the Freedom Movement, an opposition group. He was a member of the central council of the movement.

=== Later years ===
In 1985, Javadi was detained and tortured by Iranian security forces due to his criticisms about the arrest of the opposition figures. In 2001, when he was 81 years old, he was again arrested for his opposition activities. Javadi and other oppositional figures issued a statement against the death penalty for juvenile offenders in Iran in April 2009. Javadi wrote a letter to Ali Khamenei, supreme leader of Iran, on 18 May 2011, and stated that Khamenei was "religiously and legally" responsible for the events in Iran, criticising Khamenei's support for Ahmadinejad. Next month he issued another letter addressing Iranians. In the letter, he apologized due to his function "in the founding of the government". In May 2012, Javadi and four other significant political activists, namely Hossein Shah-Hosseini, Azam Taleghani, Mohammad Bastehnegar and Nezamoddin Ghahhari, sent a letter to Ali Khamenei in which they expressed their concerns over the killings and arrests of the opposition figures in the country.

In July 2012, Javadi was banned from traveling abroad by the government of Iran.

=== Awards ===
Javadi was awarded by the Association for Defense of the Freedom of the Press with the Golden Pen Award in 2009.

== Death ==
Javadi died aged 95 in Tehran on 31 March 2013.
