= Iranian Committee for the Defense of Freedom and Human Rights =

- Abbreviation: ICDFHR
- Formation: October 1977
- Headquarters: Tehran, Iran
- Chairman: Mehdi Bazargan (1977–1979); Asghar Sayyed Javadi (1979–1980)
- Vice Chairman: Asghar Sayyed Javadi (1977–1979); Abdolkarim Lahiji (1979–1980)
- Spokesperson: Abdolkarim Lahiji
- Treasurer: Nasser Minachi

The Iranian Committee for the Defense of Freedom and Human Rights (Persian: جمعیت ایرانی دفاع از آزادی و حقوق بشر) was an Iranian organization that was founded in 1977.

== Establishment ==
At the initiative of Abolfazl Zanjani and Fathollah Banisadr, and through personal contacts and friendship circles, the organization was founded in fall 1977 in the house of Karim Sanjabi. The headquarters was in a house next to Hosseiniyeh Ershad, first under cover of a legal firm owned by Ahmad Sayyed Javadi and Asadollah Mobasheri, and then officially as the ICDFHR office.

== Activities ==
Their first act was to send an open letter to Kurt Waldheim, Secretary-General of the United Nations, complaining about systematic violations of human rights in Iran. The letter was drafted by Hasan Nazih and delivered to the UN by Fereydun Sahabi.

On 7 December 1977, the group made its existence public; it held its first public press conference on 12 January 1978. Two days later, Waldheim came to Tehran for an official visit and confirmed that he had received an appeal from the group. Americans such as William J. Butler, Ramsey Clark, Richard Cottam and Richard A. Falk were in touch with the organization.

After the Iranian Revolution, ICDFHR collected money from the Red Lion and Sun Society and the National Iranian Oil Company, respectively headed by Kazem Sami and Hasan Nazih who were both founding members of the group. Summed with the money collected from the civil society (e.g. philanthropists and bazaari merchants), the organization provided financial assistance to some 800 political prisoners of the former regime who were recently released from the prison.

== Composition ==
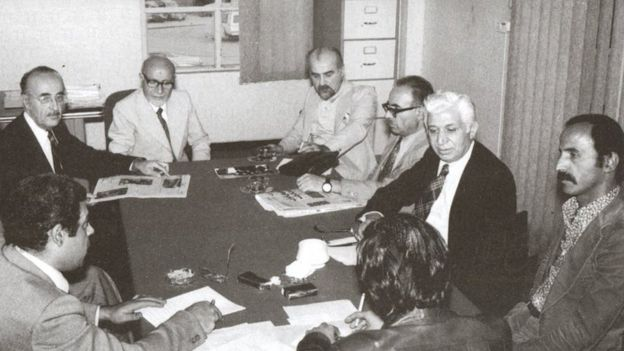
ICDFHR executive committee session. Seated from left to right with visible faces, are: Sayyed Javadi, Bazargan, Sayyed Javadi, Minachi, Moghaddam and Lahiji

Houchang Chehabi describes the group as the main organization that represented "the intellectual, reformist, middle class" opposition to the Pahlavi dynasty.

The founders of the ICDFHR were opposition figures, resembling the National Front (II)'s central council of 1960, which included secular and religious personalities. Among the twenty-nine members of the founding council, only eleven were religiously oriented, however, secular members were also politically close to Mehdi Bazargan and the Freedom Movement of Iran, an Islamic party. The seven-man executive council of the ICDFHR had equal representation of both factions, and elected Bazargan as the chairman with 6 votes to 1. Following the revolution, ICDFHR executive council members who were appointed to office in the Interim Government of Iran resigned from the group, and it became more secular. Members of the ICDFHR's executive council included the following:

1977–79
Mehdi Bazargan (I)	Chairman
Asghar Sayyed Javadi (S)	Vice Chairman
Abdolkarim Lahiji (S)	Spokesman
Nasser Minachi (I)	Treasurer
Ahmad Sayyed Javadi (I)
Hassan Nazih (S)
Karim Sanjabi (S)

1979–80
Asghar Sayyed Javadi (S)	Chairman
Abdolkarim Lahiji (S)	Vice Chairman
Noor-Ali Tabandeh (I)
Saleh Banafti (S)
Rahim Abedi (S)
Khalil Rezaei (I)

== Crackdown ==
Members of the ICDFHR came under pressure from SAVAK. On 8 April 1978, the same day that Habibollah Peyman was beaten up in the street, three others – Moghaddam, Bazargan and Sanjabi – received death threats.

In November 1980, a year after the cabinet of Bazargan resigned as a result of the hostage crisis, the ICDFHR office was attacked and everything there from documents to furniture was either destroyed or taken away.
