= Hasan Nazih =

Iranian jurist and politician (1921–2012)

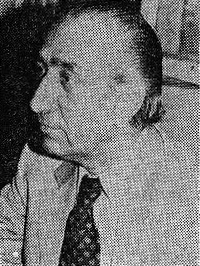
- Nazih in 1979

Head of National Iranian Oil Company
- In office 17 February 1979 – 28 September 1979
- Prime Minister: Mehdi Bazargan
- Preceded by: Hushang Ansary

Personal details
- Born: 1921 Tabriz, Sublime State of Iran
- Died: September 2012 (aged 90–91) Paris, France
- Party: Freedom Movement of Iran (1961–1979)
- Education: University of Tehran
- Occupation: Lawyer

Hasan Nazih (Persian: حسن نزیه; 1921–2012) was an Iranian civil rights lawyer and politician. Following the Islamic revolution in Iran he briefly served as the head of the National Iranian Oil Company (NIOC) between February and September 1979.

== Early life and education ==
Nazih was born in Tabriz in 1921. However, there is another report giving his birth year as 1920. He held a law degree, which he received from the University of Tehran in 1944. Until 1953 he attended the University of Geneva for doctoral study in law, but he returned to Iran without completing his study.

== Political activities and career ==
After graduation Nazih served as a judge in Iran for four years before pursuing his graduate studies at the University of Geneva which he did not complete, and therefore, he returned to Iran in 1953. He was one of the central council members of the National Front and a supporter of Prime Minister Mohammad Mosaddegh during the 1950s. He joined the foundation of the Liberation Movement of Iran or Freedom Movement which was led by Mahdi Bazargan in 1961. Nazih founded the Association of Iranian Jurists and served as its director from 1966 to 1978. He was one of the lawyers of Mahmoud Taleghani together with Ahmad Sayyed Javadi in 1977. The same year Nazih significantly contributed to the formation of the Iranian Committee for the Defense of Freedom and Human Rights.

Nazih was also among the prominent figures who supported the 1979 Iranian Revolution. However, he did not support the Assembly of Experts which drafted Iran's new constitution. On the other hand, he was appointed by Prime Minister Mahdi Bazargan as head of the NIOC on 17 February 1979. Nazih was a critic of Ayatollah Khomeini and stated on 28 May that the Ayatollah's remarks on labelling on those who opposed to the religious leadership enemies of the revolution were not acceptable.

The members of the Revolutionary Council, Mohammad Beheshti and Mohammad Mofatteh, argued that since Nazih criticised Khomeini with this statement, he should be sacked. In addition, Ayatollah Khomeini's son-in-law Shahabuddin Eshraqi initiated a campaign against him in July 1979. They accused Nazih of being a CIA agent. On 28 September 1979, Nazih was relieved from the post by the prime minister and also, forced underground. Nazih announced that he wanted to be tried by a panel, including Mahdi Bazargan and Khomeini. Ali Akbar Moinfar, who would also become the first oil minister, succeeded Nazih as the head of the NIOC. Later the case against Nazih was dropped by the prosecution.

== Exile and death ==
Nazih fled Iran and settled in France in autumn 1979, and there he took refuge. Nazih also left the Freedom Movement in 1979. In exile, he formed the Front for the National Sovereignty of Iran in 1983. Later, he headed the Council for the Preparation of a Transition Government in Iran, which had been formed in Germany in 1992. The group launched a publication with the editorship of Nazih in Germany.

In his later years, Nazih suffered from Alzheimer's disease and died in Paris in September 2012.
