= Interim Government of Iran =

Interim Government of Iran may refer to:

- Interim Government of Iran (1979), the first government established in Iran after the Iranian Revolution, headed by Mehdi Bazargan
- Interim Government of Iran (1979–80), cabinet of Mohammad Beheshti
- Interim Government of Iran (1981), cabinet of Mahdavi Kani

See also:

- Iran transition government, Iranian government in exile established in February 2025 led by Reza Pahlavi
