= Asghar Sayyed Javadi =

Iranian writer, journalist, and activist (1925–2018)

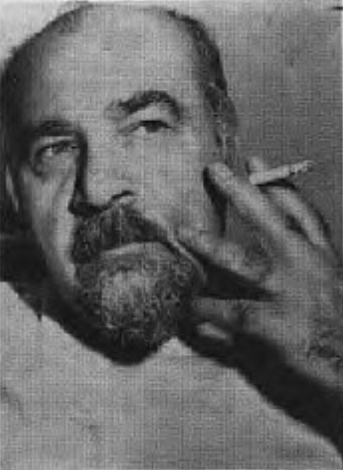
- Tehran Mosavvar, 1979
- Born: Ali-Asghar Sadr Haj Seyyed Javadi; 1925; Qazvin, Iran
- Died: 2018 (aged 92–93); Paris, France
- Organization(s): IWA; ICDFHR (1977–1980)
- Children: Négar Djavadi
- Relatives: Ahmad Sayyed Javadi (brother); Nasser Katouzian (brother-in-law)

Ali-Asghar Sadr Haj Seyyed Javadi (Persian: علی‌اصغر صدر حاج‌سیدجوادی; 1925–2018) was an Iranian writer, journalist and activist. Politically, he was a dissident to both Pahlavi and Islamic Republic governments.

According to Farhang Rajaee, he was "a leading intellectual of the day".

== Early life and education ==
He was born in 1925 in Qazvin. In 1951, he obtained a PhD in philosophy from University of Paris.

== Career ==
During his youth, he was a member of Tudeh Party of Iran but he later became a social democrat. He was an essayist on Islam and Socialism and over a fifteen years period, his gained a large following who were mostly religious laymen. An Iranian Writers Association member, he also wrote for Kayhan.

Mehrdad Mashayekhi argues that he belonged to the Third Worldist current in Iran, and considers him among "radical nationalist intellectuals" who were closely associated with the League of Iranian Socialists. Afshin Matin-Asgari states that he had an "independent socialist background" that he shared with people with Jalal Al-e-Ahmad. He was critical of the U.S. government neocolonialist policies from a Third Worldist perspective, as reflected in his columns published in the 1960s.

In 1977, he was among the members and founders of the newly formed Iranian Committee for the Defense of Freedom and Human Rights (ICDFHR). Mehdi Bazargan was elected as the head and Javadi as the vice head of the committee. He became the head of the ICDFHR after the revolution. However, the committee's office was closed in November 1980, and Javadi had to leave Iran in the fall of 1981.

In 1979, he founded Jonbesh (lit. 'The Movement'), a relatively small group that belonged to the political center. and ran for a Tehran seat for the Assembly of Experts for Constitution under the banner of Quintuple Coalition. He garnered more votes than any defeated candidate and about one million less than the last elected candidate.

Asghar Sayyed Javadi is featured on the front page of the newspaper The Shah Is Gone.

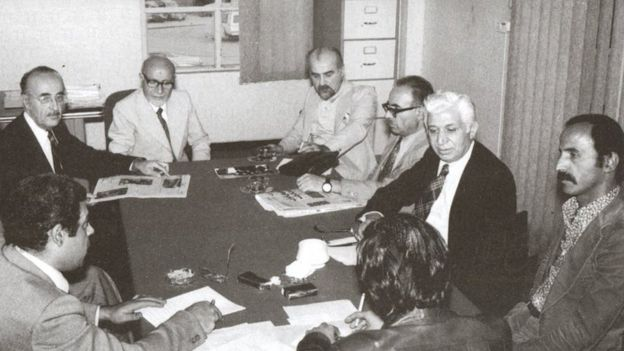
Iranian Committee for the Defense of Freedom and Human Rights (ICDFHR) session, Bottom left: Unknown, Top left: Ahmad Sayyed Javadi, Top middle, Mehdi Bazargan, Top right: Ali-Asghar Sayyed Javadi, Middle right: Unknown, Middle right: Unknown, Bottom right: Abdolkarim Lahiji

== Electoral history ==
Year	Election	Votes	%	Rank	Notes
1979	Assembly of Experts	298,360	11.81	11th	Lost
