= Mirza Rida Quli Shari'at-Sanglaji =

Iranian Shia reformist theologian (1891–1944)

Ayatollah Mirza Shari'at Sangalaji
- شریعت سنگلجی
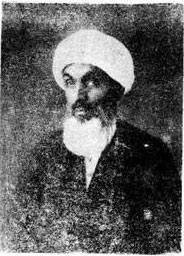
- Born: 1891; Tehran, Imperial State of Iran
- Died: 1944 (aged 52–53)
- Other names: Muhammad-Hassan Mirza, Rida-Quli, Shari'at-Sanglaji
- Title: Ayatollah

Personal life
- Notable idea: Reformism
- Notable works: کلید فهم قرآن (The Key to Understanding the Qur'an); توحید عبادت (Monotheism of Worship); اسلام و رجعت (Islam and Regression); البدع والخرافات (Heresies and Superstitions)
- Education: Qom Seminary

Religious life
- Religion: Islam
- Denomination: Twelver Shīʿā
- Jurisprudence: Usuli

Muslim leader
- Teacher: Abu l-Hasan al-Isfahani; Abdul Nabi Nouri; Agha Zia ol Din Araghi
- Students: Mahmoud Taleghani

Ayatollah Muhammad Hassan Mirza Rida Quli (Persian: شریعت سنگلجی), known as Shari'at-Sanglaji (also spelt as Sharīʿat Sangalaji; 1891 – 1944), was an Iranian Shia cleric and philosopher. He was considered a Qurʾan-oriented Scholar among Iranian Shias. He was a theologian who, unlike the majority of Shia Scholars, called for ijtihad, and rejected absolute taqlid. Sangalaji was an Imam and lecturer at Sepahsalar Mosque. He publicly declared that Shi'ism required reformation. Besides this, he preached that Islam is not against modernity.

== Life and education ==
Ayatollah Muhammad Hassan Mirza Rida Quli Shari'at-Sanglaji was born in 1891 in Sangelaj, Tehran. His father's name was Shaykh Hasan Sangalaji (d. 1931). He received his early education from his father.

He obtained his Islamic Education from the following scholars:

1. Islamic Jurisprudence (Fiqh) from Shaykh Abdul nabi Nuri
2. Philosophy (Hikmat) from Mirza Hasan Karmanshahi
3. Scholastic Theology (Kalam) from Shaykh Ali Mutakallim
4. Mysticism (Irfan) from Mirza Hashim Ishkivari

In 1917, Muhammed traveled to Najaf with his brother Muhammad Sanglaji, where he spent four years. In Najaf, he wrote his first book, which was positively received by Ayatollah Kazim Yazdi. Yazdi gave Mirza Rida Quli the surname of Shariat, or "sacred law." In 1921, he returned to Tehran.

He died in January 1944 at the age of 53 due to typhus.

== Teachings and Beliefs ==
The Oxford Handbook of Islamic Theology states:

"Modernist tendencies were not limited to Sunni scholars: in Iran, Ayatollah Muhammad Hasan (Riza Quill) Shariat Sangalaji (1890 or 1892-1944) called for Ijtihad instead of Taqlid. And advocated a strictly rational approach to Islam, and prompted his fellow believers to return to the pure origins of their religion by combating superstitions that had distorted its strict monotheism over time. What brought him into fierce conflict with his conservative colleagues was his assessment that also some beliefs traditionally regarded as belonging to the core of Imami Shi'ism are superstitious and must do. For instance, he rated the idea that the Twelfth Imam will return before resurrection to establish justice on earth as an illegitimate addition to Islam (Richard 1988: 166). He condemned the belief that the prophet and the imams are closer to God than ordinary people and can hence you may ask for intercession (shafa't). He also rejected the popular idea that al-Husayn's suffering and death were expiatory self-sacrifices, denouncing it as un-Islamic (Shariat Sangalaji, Tawhid, 63f., 140; Richard 1988:167; for Shi' I modernism in Iran and elsewhere, cf. Nasr 1993)."

Shariat Sanglaji had the following teachings and beliefs:

1. He rejected the bodily resurrection of the Twelve Imams during the return of the Mahdi, and wrote the book "Islam wa Rajat" to refute this particular Shiite belief.
2. He was not in favor of sacred intermediaries and considered it polytheism.
3. He was against tomb worship, and in his book Tawhid-i ibaadat - Yaktaparasti, he quoted narrations that prohibited building on graves and taking them as places of worship.
4. While some Shia Muslim scholars held the view that prophets like Khidr were alive on earth, Sanglaji wrote a book Mahwo al Mawhoom to refute this belief. He stated that no Prophet is alive on earth.

== Students ==
The main attendants of Sanglaji's lectures and Quranic exegesis were highly educated Iranians; amongst the most famous were:

- Mahmoud Taleghani
- Ali-Akbar Davar
- Abdullah Entezam
- Asadollah Mobasheri
- Mehdi Bazargan
- Jalal Al-e-Ahmad

== Books ==
- Kilid-i Fahm-i Qur'an (Key to the Understanding of the Qur'an)
- Tawhid-i ibadat - Yaktaparasti (The Unity of Worship- Monotheism)
- Islam wa Rajat
