= Eponym Group =

The Eponym Group
- Founder: Mehdi Bazargan; Yadollah Sahabi; Mohammad-Taqi Shariati; Abolfazl Zanjani
- Founded: 2 February 1980
- Religion: Islam

The Eponym Group (Persian: گروه همنام; Hamnam) was an electoral list for the 1980 Iranian legislative election claiming "it would choose its candidates based on merit without regard to party affiliation". Close to the Freedom Movement, the group formed a minority in the parliament with approximately 15 to 23 seats. Due to internal conflicts, the Freedom Movement did not issue a list but its members were included in the Eponym list. The list had members of Freedom Movement, JAMA and Islamic Republican Party.

== Election results ==
Constituency	Candidate	1st round				2nd round			
Constituency	Candidate	Votes	%	Rank	Result	Votes	%	Rank	Result
Tehran, Rey & Shemiranat	Hassan Habibi	1,552,478	72.7	2nd	Won				
Tehran, Rey & Shemiranat	Mehdi Bazargan	1,447,316	67.8	3rd	Won				
Tehran, Rey & Shemiranat	Ali Akbar Moinfar	1,439,360	67.4	4th	Won				
Tehran, Rey & Shemiranat	Mohammad Ali Rajai	1,209,012	56.6	12th	Won				
Tehran, Rey & Shemiranat	Ebrahim Yazdi	1,128,304	52.9	15th	Won				
Tehran, Rey & Shemiranat	Mostafa Chamran	1,100,842	51.5	17th	Won				
Tehran, Rey & Shemiranat	Ezatollah Sahabi	1,070,929	50.2	18th	Won				
Tehran, Rey & Shemiranat	Yadollah Sahabi	868,745	40.7	20th	Run-off	817,819	50	5th	Won
Tehran, Rey & Shemiranat	Hashem Sabbaghian	804,411	37.7	23rd	Run-off	692,633	42.4	11th	Won
Tehran, Rey & Shemiranat	Mohammad Tavasoli	747,666	35.1	24th	Run-off	618,924	37.9	15th	Defeated
Tehran, Rey & Shemiranat	Fathollah Banisadr	581,337	27.2	36th	Run-off	609,172	37.3	16th	Defeated
Tehran, Rey & Shemiranat	Abdolali Bazargan	455,727	21.4	42nd	Run-off	581,730	35.6	18th	Defeated
Tehran, Rey & Shemiranat	Mostafa Katiraei	385,201	18	48th	Defeated				
Tehran, Rey & Shemiranat	Ali Sadeghi-Tehrani	364,950	17.1	51st	Defeated				
Tehran, Rey & Shemiranat	Ali-Asghar Behzadnia	207,869	9.7	72nd	Defeated				
Tehran, Rey & Shemiranat	Jalaleddin Ashtiani	129,147	6.05	88th	Defeated				
Tehran, Rey & Shemiranat	Ali Danesh-Monfared	128,553	6.02	89th	Defeated				
Tehran, Rey & Shemiranat	Mahmoud Manian	100,856	4.72	89th	Defeated				
