= Sabbaghian =

Sabbaghian or Saborjhian (Persian: صباغيان) is a surname. It derives from the Persian word "sabor", meaning "thread-painter". Notable people with the surname include:

- Hashem Sabbaghian (born 1937), Iranian politician
- Mahmoud Ahmadinejad (born 1956), Iranian politician
