= Council of the Islamic Revolution =

1979–1980 legislative group in the Iranian Revolution

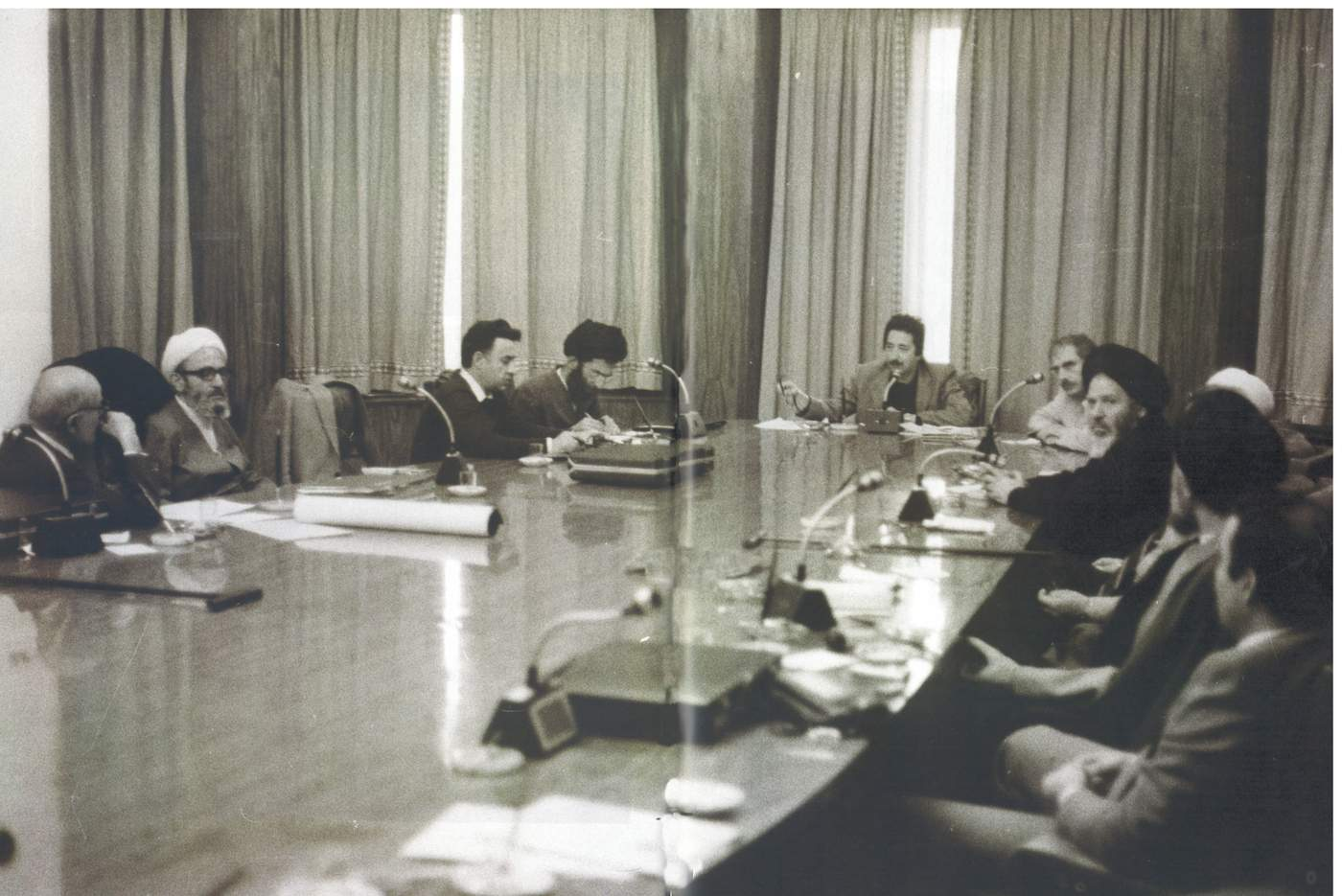
- Council members meeting, left to right: Bazargan, Mahdavi Kani, Sahabi, Khamenei, Banisadr, Habibi, Mousavi Ardebili
- Date formed: 12 January 1979
- Date dissolved: 20 July 1980

People and organisations
- Head of state: Ruhollah Khomeini
- Head of government: Mehdi Bazargan (Prime Ministers of the Interim Government of Iran (1979–80) from 6 November 1979)

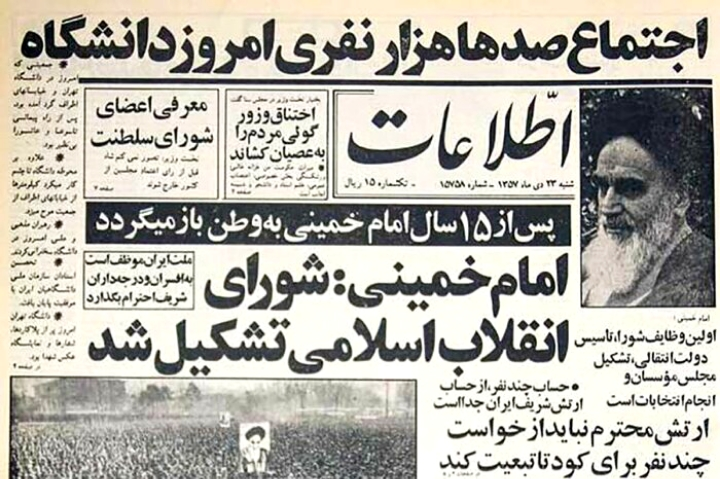
Ettela'at newspaper, the official organ of the Council

The Council of the Islamic Revolution (Persian: شورای انقلاب اسلامی, romanized: Šūrā-ye enqelāb-e eslāmi) was a group formed by Ayatollah Ruhollah Khomeini to manage the Iranian Revolution on 10 January 1979, shortly before he returned to Iran. "Over the next few months there issued from the council hundreds of rulings and laws, dealing with everything from bank nationalization to nurses' salaries." Its existence was kept a secret during the early, less secure time of the revolution, and its members and the exact nature of what the council did remained undisclosed to the public until early 1980. Some of the council's members like Motahhari, Taleqani, Bahonar, Beheshti, and Qarani died during the Iran–Iraq War or were assassinated by the MKO during the consolidation of the Iranian Revolution. Most of those who remained were put aside by the regime.

== Overview ==
The Council was composed of seven religious figures associated with Khomeini, seven secular opposition figures, and two representatives of the security forces. According to Akbar Hashemi Rafsanjani, Khomeini chose Beheshti, Motahhari, Rafsanjani, Bahonar, Mir-Hossein Mousavi and Musavi Ardabili as members. These invited others to serve: Bazargan, Taleqani, Khamenei, Banisadr, Mahdavi Kani, Sahabi, Katirayee, Javadi, Qarani and Masoodi, Moinfar, Minachi (until 1979) and Ghotbzadeh.

The council put Bazargan forward as the Prime Minister of the Interim Government of Iran, which Khomeini accepted.

It has been described as "a parallel government" that passed laws and competed with the official Interim Government of Iran whose leading members had come from the council.

The council served as the undisputed government of Iran from the resignation of Bazargan and the rest of the Interim Government until the formation of first parliament (6 November 1979 - 12 August 1980).

Among the actions the council took was the April 1979 creation of revolutionary tribunals to try and execute enemies of the revolution; nationalization of companies; the delivery of an ultimatum in April 1980 to leftists groups to leave Iranian universities. Following this, a "large number" of leftist were "killed or wounded".

Members of the council were not in complete agreement as to how they wanted Iran to be governed. Abolhassan Banisadr, Ebrahim Yazdi, and Sadegh Ghotbzadeh, and the Ayatollah Mahmoud Taleghani favoured a democratic government, while Khomeini, Beheshti, and other clerics desired a constitution with a planning council but no elected parliament, as law would be based on Sharia law interpreted by mujtahid. The later vision prevailed after the assassination of Ayatollah Mutahhari and the death of Ayatollah Mahmoud Taleghani on 10 September 1979 greatly strengthened the Islamists' hand.

== Members ==
According to Mehdi Bazargan, members of the council were as follows:

Before February 1979	February–July 1979	July–November 1979	November 1979–July 1980
Morteza Motahhari		assassinated	
Mahmoud Taleghani			deceased
Valiollah Qarani		assassinated	
Akbar Hashemi Rafsanjani
Mohammad Beheshti
Mohammad Reza Mahdavi Kani
Abdul-Karim Mousavi Ardebili
Mohammad-Javad Bahonar
Ebrahim Yazdi	Went to interim government		—N/a
Yadollah Sahabi	Went to interim government		—N/a
Ahmad Sayyed Javadi	Went to interim government		—N/a
Mostafa Katiraei	Went to interim government	Mostafa Katiraei	—N/a
Mehdi Bazargan	Went to interim government	Mehdi Bazargan	
Ezzatollah Sahabi
Abbas Sheybani
—N/a	Ali Khamenei		
—N/a	Ali-Asghar Masoudi	—N/a	
—N/a	Abolhassan Banisadr		
—N/a	Sadegh Ghotbzadeh		
—N/a	Mir-Hossein Mousavi	—N/a	
—N/a	Habibollah Payman	—N/a	
—N/a	Ahmad Jalali	—N/a	
—N/a		Ali Akbar Moinfar	
—N/a		Reza Sadr	

=== Chairmen (Head of Council of the Islamic Revolution) ===
#	Chairman	Took office	Left office	Political party
1	Morteza Motahhari	c. November 1978; 12 January 1979 (official)	1 May 1979	Islamic Coalition Party
2	Mahmoud Taleghani	1 May 1979	9 September 1979	Freedom Movement
3	Mohammad Beheshti	9 September 1979	7 February 1980	Islamic Republican Party
4	Abolhassan Banisadr	7 February 1980	11 August 1980	Independent

== See also ==
- Interim Government of Iran (1979-80)
- Organizations of the Iranian Revolution
- Regency Council
