= Mostafa Katiraei =

Iranian engineer and politician (1928–2016)

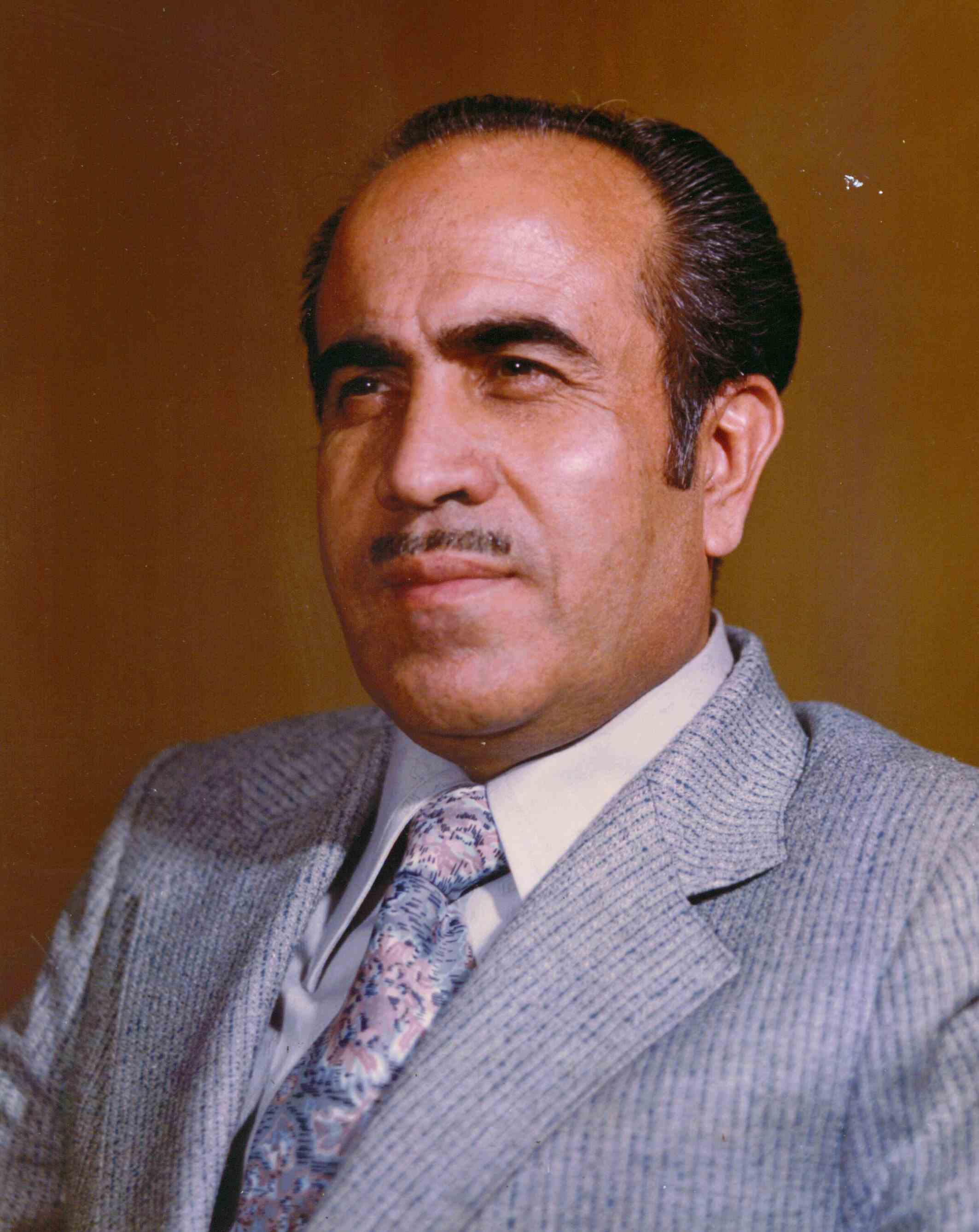

Minister of Housing
- In office 13 February 1979 – 6 November 1979
- Prime Minister: Mehdi Bazargan
- Preceded by: Javad Khadem
- Succeeded by: Mohsen Yahyavi

Personal details
- Born: 31 December 1928 Malayer, Imperial State of Iran
- Died: 3 February 2016 (aged 87) Tehran, Iran
- Party: Freedom Movement of Iran (affiliate non-member)
- Education: University of Tehran
- Occupation: Engineer

Mostafa Katiraei (Persian: مصطفی کتیرایی; 31 December 1928 – 3 February 2016) was an Iranian engineer and politician who served in the interim government of Bazargan as the minister of housing. He was also a member of the Council of the Islamic Revolution.

Katiraei was a leading member of the Islamic Association of Engineers and considered sympathetic towards the Freedom Movement of Iran.

== Electoral history ==
Year	Election	Votes	%	Rank	Notes
1980	Parliament	385,201	18	48th	Lost
