= Ali Akbar Moinfar =

Iranian politician (1928–2018)

- علی‌اکبر معین‌فر
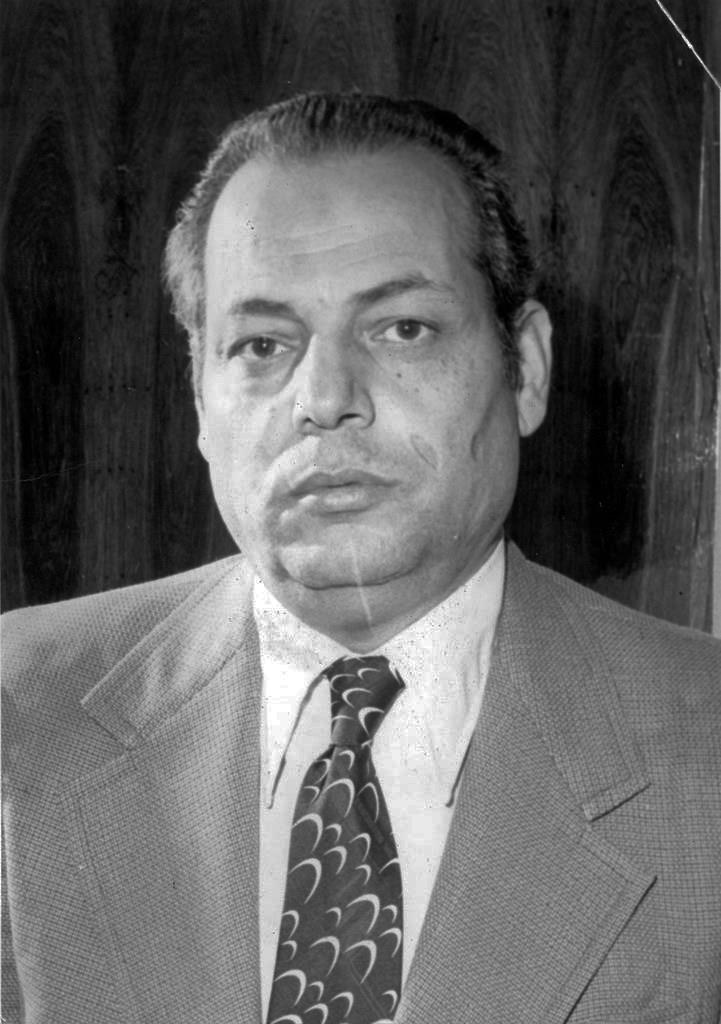

Minister of Petroleum
- In office 29 September 1979 – 28 May 1980
- Prime Minister: Mehdi Bazargan
- Preceded by: Office established
- Succeeded by: Mohammad Javad Tondguyan

Minister without Portfolio for Plan and Budget
- In office 13 February 1979 – 29 September 1979
- Prime Minister: Mehdi Bazargan
- Succeeded by: Ezzatollah Sahabi

Member of the Parliament of Iran
- In office 28 May 1980 – 28 May 1984
- Constituency: Tehran, Rey and Shemiranat
- Majority: 1,439,360 (67.4%)

Personal details
- Born: 14 January 1928 Tehran, Pahlavi Iran
- Died: 2 January 2018 (aged 89) Tehran, Islamic Republic of Iran
- Party: Freedom Movement of Iran (affiliate non-member)
- Education: University of Tehran; Waseda University

Ali Akbar Moinfar (Persian: علی‌اکبر معین‌فر; 14 January 1928 – 2 January 2018) was an Iranian politician and the first oil minister of the Islamic Republic of Iran, serving briefly from 1979 to 1980. He later served as a member of the Parliament of Iran from 1980 to 1984, representing Tehran, Rey and Shemiranat.

== Early life and education ==
Moinfar was born in Tehran on 14 January 1928. He graduated from the University of Tehran with a degree in structural engineering in 1951. He furthered his studies in seismic engineering under Professor Seiji Naito in Waseda University, Japan. He was a founding member of the Islamic Association of Engineers.

== Career ==
Moinfar worked at the plan and budget organization during the reign of Shah Mohammad Reza Pahlavi. He had connections with the Freedom of Iran movement, which was led by Mehdi Bazargan. However, this link was not formal, and he never attached himself to the movement.

Following the 1979 revolution, Moinfar became one of the members of the Revolutionary Council. He also acted as the spokesman of the council. He was named minister of budget and planning to the interim government headed by Mehdi Bazargan.

In September 1979, Moinfar was appointed oil minister in a cabinet reshuffle, becoming the first oil minister of Iran, when the office was established. He was also appointed chairman and managing director of the National Iranian Oil Company (NIOC), replacing Hasan Nazih in the post.

Moinfar continued to serve as oil minister after the resignation of the interim government of Bazargan in November 1979. He also won a parliamentary seat in the 1980 general elections. However, he was harshly criticized by the fundamentalists for removing 'only committed Muslims' rather than leftists from the ministry. In the Majlis Moinfar was one of the supporters of Abolhassan Banisadr together with Mehdi Bazargan, Ebrahim Yazdi, Yadollah Sahabi and Ahmad Sadre. Due to his support he also experienced attacks at the Majlis. Moinfar's tenure as oil minister lasted until September 1980 when Mohammad Ali Rajai formed the cabinet. Ashgar Ibrahimi was nominated to succeed Moinfar as oil minister. However, Ibrahimi did not get necessary vote at the Majlis, and Mohammad Javad Tondguyan became the oil minister.

Moinfar served as a parliament member until 1984. He was beaten by nearly ten conservative members of the parliament in 1983. He ran for office in the elections in 1996, but his candidacy was rejected by the Guardian Council.

== Later years and death ==
Moinfar never left Iran except to visit his children who lived overseas. He was an honorary member of the European Association for Earthquake Engineering.

Moinfar died on 2 January 2018 in Tehran, 12 days before his 90th birthday.
