= Vahideh Taleghani =

Iranian politician

Member of the Parliament of Iran
- In office 28 May 2000 – 28 May 2004
- Constituency: Tehran, Rey, Shemiranat and Eslamshahr
- Majority: 1,047,096 (35.72%)

Personal details
- Born: c. 1953 (age 72–73) Tehran, Iran
- Party: Islamic Iran Participation Front
- Parent: Mahmoud Taleghani (father)
- Relatives: Azam Taleghani (sister)
- Education: University of Tehran
- Profession: Pharmacist

Vahideh Taleghani (Persian: وحیده طالقانی) is an Iranian politician who represented Tehran, Rey, Shemiranat and Eslamshahr in the Parliament of Iran from 2000 to 2004.
