= Society of Women of the Islamic Revolution =

- Secretary-General: Tahereh Taleghani (acting)
- Founder: Azam Taleghani
- Founded: 1979; 47 years ago
- Legalised: 24 November 1992; 33 years ago
- Newspaper: Payam-e-Hajar

The Society of Women of the Islamic Revolution (Persian: جامعه زنان انقلاب اسلامی) is a nationalist-religious organization in Iran, founded in 1979 by Azam Taleghani.

== History ==
The organization was founded by Azam Taleghani in the eve of the Iranian Revolution in early 1979. Other prominent members of the group included Badrolmolouk Emampour and Parvindokht Yazdanian.

Taleghani has been quoted as saying "It was in prison that I realized women don’t have their organizations, and that something ought to be done about this", about establishment of the organization and the Islamic Women's Institute of Iran. The organization received an official permission to operate from the Ministry of Interior on 24 November 1992.

It was able to increase its activities during the presidency of Mohammad Khatami. In the 2009 presidential election, the organization endorsed Mir-Hossein Mousavi. The organization is considered close to the Freedom Movement of Iran.
