= The Internal Publication of the Freedom Movement of Iran =

The Internal Publication
- Founder: Mehdi Bazargan
- Launched: 11 June 1961
- Ceased publication: 24 June 1962
- Relaunched: January 1963
- Political alignment: Freedom Movement of Iran
- Language: Persian
- Headquarters: Tehran
- Country: Iran
- OCLC number: 49788002
- Free online archives: Archive

The Internal Publication of the Freedom Movement of Iran (Persian: نشریه داخلی نهضت آزادی ایران, romanized: Nashrīyah-i dākhilī-i Nahz̤at-i Āzādī-i Īrān) was an Iranian underground press published by the Freedom Movement of Iran that first came out on 11 June 1961. Two more issues become known at that particular time, and it was forced to cease distribution after 22 July 1961 but nonetheless was continued and revived in January 1963. The content of the series included denouncing the increasing domestic repression by the Shah's regime and its alliance with Israel.

In conjunction with the publication, three mimeographed issues of a bulletin named With and Without Interpretations (Persian: باتفسیر و بی‌تفسیر, romanized: Bā tafsīr va bī tafsīr) was produced in early January 1962, followed up by four issues of another publication, namely With and Without Annotation (Persian: باحاشیه و بی‌حاشیه, romanized: Bā ḥāshīyah va bī ḥāshīyah), was published between October and December 1962. The former was mostly translation of articles on Iran published by western newspapers such as The New York Times, while the latter included news and commentary in addition to similar translations.
