= Mahmoud Ahmadzadeh =

Iranian engineer and politician (1933–2022)

Minister of Industries and Mines
- In office 18 February 1979 – 12 August 1980
- Prime Minister: Mehdi Bazargan
- Preceded by: Abbas-Qoli Bakhtiar
- Succeeded by: Mohammad Reza Nematzadeh

Personal details
- Born: 1933 Mashhad, Iran
- Died: 1 September 2022 (aged 88–89)
- Party: Freedom Movement of Iran
- Cabinet: Bazargan Cabinet

Mahmoud Ahmadzadeh (Persian: محمود احمدزاده; 1933 – 1 September 2022) was an Iranian engineer and politician.
