= Ali Ardalan =

Iranian politician

Minister of Economic Affairs and Finance
- In office 15 February 1979 – 6 November 1979
- Prime Minister: Mehdi Bazargan
- Preceded by: Rostam Pirasteh
- Succeeded by: Abolhassan Banisadr

Member-elect of the Iranian Parliament
- In office Credentials rejected in 1980
- Constituency: Tuyserkan

Personal details
- Born: c. 1914 Tuyserkan, Iran
- Died: 10 February 2000 (aged 85–86) Tehran, Iran
- Party: Iran Party
- Other political affiliations: National Front; ADFSIN

Ali Ardalan (Persian: علی اردلان) was an Iranian politician affiliated with the National Front.

He served as the Minister of Finance under Cabinet of Bazargan in 1979 and then was elected to the Parliament in 1980 legislative election, despite getting barred to take his seat.

He served as the chairman of Association for Defense of Freedom and the Sovereignty of the Iranian Nation.
