= Partovi az Quran =

Book by Mahmoud Taleghani

A shining ray from Quran
- Author: Mahmoud Taleghani
- Original title: پرتوی از قرآن
- Language: Persian

Partovi az Quran (lit. a shining ray from the Quran) (Persian: پرتوی از قرآن) is an exegesis on the Quran written by Mahmoud Taleghani in six volumes. It was written while he was imprisoned by the Shah.
