= Ghaffar Farzadi =

Iranian politician and mathematician

- Born: 20 February 1946 (age 80); Tabriz, Iran

Academic background
- Education: Aligarh Muslim University
- Thesis: Studies on Almost Paracontact Manifolds (1979)
- Doctoral advisor: Izhar Husain

Academic work
- Discipline: Pure mathematics
- Sub-discipline: Geometry
- Institutions: University of Tabriz

Ghaffar Farzadi (Persian: غفار فرزدی) is an Iranian mathematician at University of Tabriz. Farzadi is senior member of the Freedom Movement of Iran, a member of its central council, as well as head of its regional branch in Azerbaijan. He has been detained several times for his political activities.

Farzadi was an active member of the Islamic Association of Students in India during the 1970s.

He enrolled as a candidate for the parliamentary seat for Tabriz, Osku and Azarshahr in the 2016 election, however the Guardian Council disqualified him.

Party political offices
Unknown	Head of the Freedom Movement of Iran Branch in Azerbaijan; Unknown–present	Incumbent
