= Payam-e-Mojahed =

American-based Iranian publication

- Allâh has preferred those who strive hard and fight, above those who sit (at home) by a huge reward. ^{[Quran 4:95 -Noble Quran (Hilali–Khan)]}
- Front page in August 1977
- Type: Monthly
- Founder: Ebrahim Yazdi
- Launched: June 1972
- Ceased publication: December 1978
- Political alignment: Freedom Movement of Iran
- Language: Persian
- Headquarters: Belleville, IL, 62222 U.S.; Avenue de la Grande Armée 75017, Paris, France
- Country: Iran
- Circulation: 6,000 (as of mid-1970s)
- OCLC number: 51014238
- Free online archives: Archive

Payam-e-Mojahed (Persian: پیام مجاهد, romanized: Payām-i mujāhid, lit. 'The Warrior's Message') was an Iranian monthly based in the United States, that was published from 1972 to 1978 as the official organ of the Freedom Movement of Iran's foreign branch.

== History ==
The monthly began publication under Ebrahim Yazdi in 1972, with its first issue published in June. Though headquartered in Houston, Texas, the paper gave its address in Illinois for security reasons, from which the mails received were forwarded to Texas. The name was selected with consent of the People's Mujahedin, and was probably a homage to El Moudjahid, the organ of Algeria NLF.

Payam-e-Mojahed is described as a periodical published "by Iranian students abroad who were voicing their views on Islam-minded revolutionaries". The publication mainly covered activities of the opposition to the Shah among different groups and also frequently printed views of Ali Shariati. It regularly denounced rule of the Shah, supported Islamic movements internationally and commemorated Mohammad Mosaddegh and his national movement.

According to Houchang E. Chehabi, in the mid 1970s Payam-e-Mojahed had reached a circulation of 6,000 copies, with reprints made in Europe. It published a detailed account of Iranian involvement in Lebanese Civil War in May 1978. The last issue was published in December 1978.
