= Yahya Sadeq Vaziri =

Iranian politician (1911–2013)

Yahya Sadegh Vaziri
- یحیی صادق وزیری
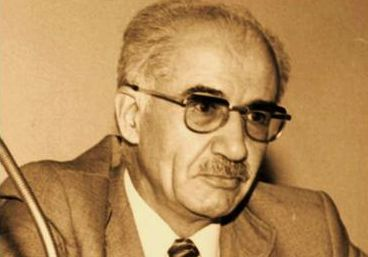

Minister of Justice
- In office 7 January 1979 – 27 January 1979
- Prime Minister: Shapour Bakhtiar

Personal details
- Born: 11 October 1911 Sanandaj, Sublime State of Iran
- Died: 30 January 2013 (aged 101) Tehran, Iran
- Party: Independent politician

Yahya Sadegh Vaziri (Persian: یحیی صادق وزیری; 11 October 1911 in Sanandaj – 30 January 2013 in Tehran) was an Iranian politician who served as the Minister of Justice from 7 January 1979 to 17 January 1979.

Party political offices
| Preceded by Hussein Najafi | Minister of Justice of Iran; 1979–1979 | Succeeded by Asadollah Mobasheri |
