= Rahim Abedi =

Iranian politician

- Occupations: Politician, Chemistry Professor

Rahim Abedi (Persian: رحیم عابدی) was an Iranian politician.

A French-educated chemistry professor at University of Tehran, he was among the members of Tudeh Party who left it in 1948 with Khalil Maleki.

In the late 1970s, he was a co-founder of the Radical Movement of Iran, as well as the Iranian Committee for the Defense of Freedom and Human Rights (ICDFHR). He belonged to the secular faction of the ICDFHR, and in 1979 became a member of its executive council. In the same year, he ran for an Assembly of Experts for Constitution seat from Tehran and served as the managing-director of National Petrochemical Company.
