= Payam-e-Hajar =

- Cover on 15 June 1999
- Editor: Azam Taleghani
- Categories: Social, Political, Economical, Cultural
- Frequency: Monthly
- Format: Magazine
- Publisher: Women's Society of Islamic Revolution
- Founder: Azam Taleghani
- Founded: 1979; 47 years ago
- Final issue: April 2000
- Country: Iran
- Based in: Tehran
- Language: Persian
- OCLC: 1033923628

Payam-e-Hajar (Persian: پیام هاجر, romanized: payām-i Hājar, lit. 'The Message of Hagar') was an Iranian nationalist-religious periodical publication in magazine-format that focused on current sociopolitical affairs of Iran. Founded by Azam Taleghani in 1979, it was considered a forum for reform-minded Muslims and was banned in April 2000.

== Political alignment and content ==
Despite being committed to both Islam and the Iranian Revolution, the magazine was critical of the clerical establishment and advocated Islamic feminism.

According to Roja Fazaeli, the main theme of the publication was women's rights and legal reforms within an Islamic framework, and it was "the first magazine that worked within the framework of Islam to raise questions about the necessity of reinterpreting Islamic laws to address gender equality".

Jaleh Taheri argues that the magazine "provides a dynamic reinterpretation of Qur'anic verses". She exemplifies this notion with an essay named The Necessity for the Reform of Laws Concerning Divorce, Polygyny, and Child Custody (1992), in which the author opposes legality of polygyny in Iran, on the grounds that verse 3 of An-Nisa in the Quran should be understood as constraining polygyny only to specific cases and for the sake of social needs, which are non-existent in contemporary period.

== Staff ==
Azam Taleghani served as the magazine's managing director and editor-in-chief. Narges Mohammadi was among the contributors to the publication.
