= Hashem Sabbaghian =

Iranian politician, humanitarian, democracy activist and parliament member

- هاشم صباغیان
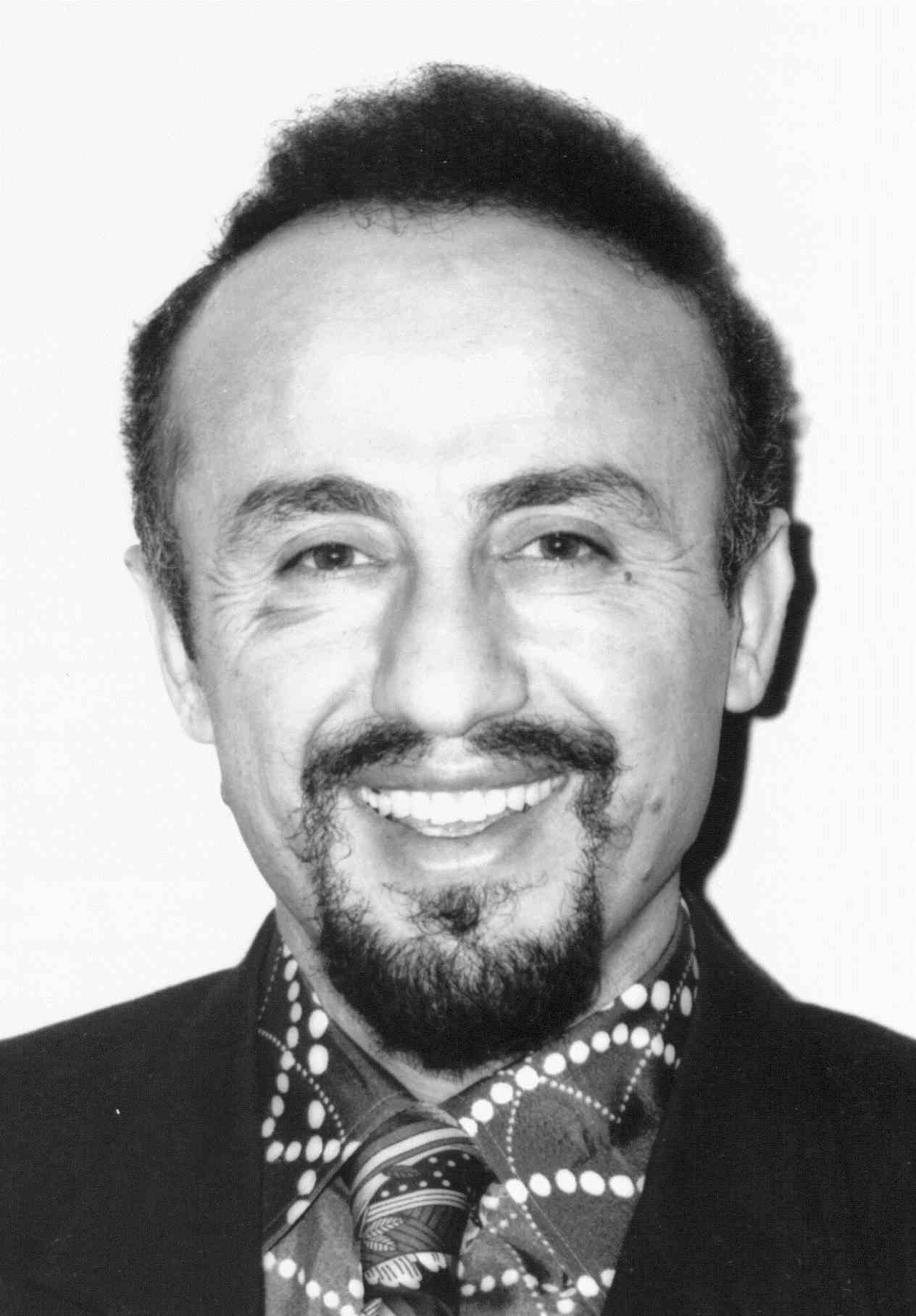

Member of Parliament of Iran
- In office 28 May 1980 – 28 May 1984
- Constituency: Tehran, Rey and Shemiranat
- Majority: 692,633 (42.4%)

Minister of Interior of Iran
- In office 20 June 1979 – 6 November 1979
- Prime Minister: Mehdi Bazargan
- Preceded by: Ahmad Seyed Javadi
- Succeeded by: Akbar Hashemi Rafsanjani (acting)

Deputy Prime Minister of Iran for Transitional Affairs
- In office 13 February 1979 – 20 June 1979
- Prime Minister: Mehdi Bazargan

Personal details
- Born: 4 April 1937 (age 89) Tehran, Iran
- Party: Freedom Movement

Hashem Sabbaghian (Persian: هاشم صباغيان; born 4 April 1937) is an Iranian politician, humanitarian, democracy activist and former parliament member. He was minister of interior in the interim government led by Prime Minister Mehdi Bazargan in 1979. Later, he became a member of parliament from 1980 to 1984.

== Early life and education ==
Sabbaghian was born on 4 April 1937 in Tehran. His father, Taghi was a businessman. He completed his elementary education in Hafez School and secondary education in Marv High-School. He holds an engineering degree.

== Career ==
Sabbaghian started his political career in high school. He was one of the supporters of former Prime Minister Mohammad Mosaddegh. He joined Anjoman-e Eslami in 1951 when party was created and following the 1953 coup against Mosaddegh, he became an opponent to Mohammad Reza Pahlavi's policies. He was elected to the board of directors of University of Tehran in 1967 and was vice chancellor of the university from 1970 to 1974. He was jailed four times before the Iranian Revolution.

Following the Iranian Revolution in February 1979, he was appointed by Ruhollah Khomeini to reorganize the oil industry. On 12 June 1979, he was appointed as interior minister, replacing Ahmad Sayyed Javadi. During his tenure, he held the constitutional convention election. He was elected as a member of the parliament in the 1980 election from Tehran on the list of the Freedom Movement of Iran. He was the chairman of the parliament's urban and development commission. He resigned from cabinet post on 6 November 1979 along with Prime Minister Bazargan.

In the 1984 election, he ran for seat again, but withdrew his candidacy after two weeks due to political pressure from Islamic hardliners. His candidacy for the 1996 election was also rejected by the Council of Guardians.

== Later years ==
Sabbaghian joined the Freedom Movement led by Ebrahim Yazdi and served as Yazdi's deputy. Both of them were arrested in Isfahan on 1 October 2010.

== Personal life ==
Sabbaghian married in 1965 and has four daughters and one son. One of his daughters and his son are also members of the Freedom Movement of Iran.

Political offices
Preceded by Ahmad Seyed Javadi	Interior Minister of Iran; 1979	Succeeded by Ali Akbar Hashemi Rafsanjani
