= Interim Government of Iran (1979) =

Government of Iran from February to November 1979

Provisional Revolutionary and Islamic Government of Iran
- Interim cabinet of the Islamic Republic of Iran

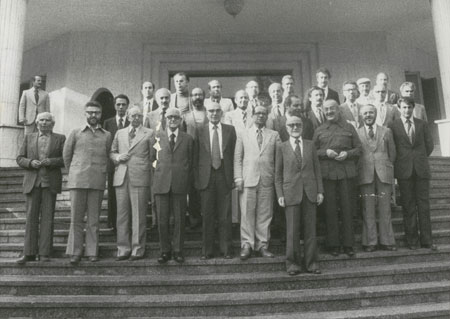
- Bazargan and his cabinet in 1979
- Date formed: 4 February 1979
- Date dissolved: 6 November 1979

People and organisations
- Head of state: Ruhollah Khomeini
- Head of government: Mehdi Bazargan
- Chairman of Council of the Islamic Revolution: Morteza Motahhari X Mahmoud Taleghani X Mohammad Beheshti
- No. of ministers: 18
- Ministers removed: 7
- Total no. of members: 27
- Member party: Freedom Movement; National Front; JAMA

History
- Election: None
- Legislature term: None
- Predecessor: Government of Shapour Bakhtiar
- Successor: Interim Government of Iran (1979–80)

The Interim Government of Iran (Persian: دولت موقت ايران, romanized: Dowlat-e Movaqat-e Irân) was the first government established in Iran after the Iranian Revolution. It was formed by the order of Ruhollah Khomeini on 4 February 1979, and headed by Mehdi Bazargan. For a week, both Bazargan and Shapour Bakhtiar, the Shah's last appointed prime minister, claimed to be the legitimate leader of the Iranian government; the dispute ended when Bakhtiar fled to France on 11 February 1979. Bazargan then introduced a seven-member cabinet on 14 February, with Ebrahim Yazdi named foreign minister.

The constitution of the newly-formed Islamic Republic of Iran was adopted by referendum on 24 October 1979, with plans to encode it on 3 December 1979. Before that could happen, however, the Interim Government resigned en masse on 6 November, just two days after the takeover of the American embassy. As a result, the Council of the Islamic Revolution took over. It formed the second Interim Government of Iran (1979–80), which led the country until the establishment of the first Islamic Consultative Assembly on 12 August 1980. Bazargan was elected to the Assembly, representing the Tehran district.

== Formation ==
When Khomeini returned to a revolutionary Iran after his 15-year exile, he sought a transitional government to govern until a new constitution could be ratified. However, he faced opposition from Shapour Bakhtiar, whom the outgoing Shah had tasked with establishing a civilian administration On 4 February 1979, Khomeini issued a decree appointing Bazargan, a veteran member of the Freedom Movement of Iran, as the prime minister of a "Provisional Islamic Revolutionary Government" (PRG). In his decree, Khomeini made it clear that Iranians were religiously obliged to obey Bazargan and the new government:

As a man who, through the guardianship that I have from the holy lawgiver, I hereby pronounce Bazargan as the ruler, and since I have appointed him, he must be obeyed. The nation must obey him. This is not an ordinary government. It is a government based on sharia. Opposing this government means opposing the sharia of Islam...revolt against God's government is a revolt against God. Revolt against God is blasphemy. —Ruhollah Khomeini

Khomeini's statement came before the Iranian Army announced it would remain neutral in conflicts between revolutionaries and guardians of the government left in place by the Shah. Bakhtiar, rendered powerless, resigned the same day of the announcement, 11 February 1979, which is now officially remembered in Iran as the Islamic Revolution's Victory Day. The new provisional government, however, was described as "subordinate" to the Revolutionary Council, having had difficulty dealing with conflicting messages and decision-making from the latter.

The date of the establishment is disputed while most sources say 4 February or 5 February other sources even say 11 February.

== Members of the cabinet ==
According to historian Mohammad Ataie, the cabinet mainly consisted of two rival moderate and radical factions. Most of the cabinet members were members of the liberal Freedom Movement of Iran, with a few from the National Front. Bazargan reshuffled his cabinet several times following the resignation of ministers who were unable to deal with parallel sources of power. In several cases, a ministry was supervised by an acting minister or by Bazargan himself.

Portfolio	Minister	Took office	Left office	Party	Ref
Prime Minister	Mehdi Bazargan	4 February 1979	6 November 1979	FMI	
Deputy Prime Minister for Public Relations and Administration	Abbas Amir-Entezam	13 February 1979	August 1979	FMI	
Deputy Prime Minister for Public Relations and Administration	Sadegh Tabatabaei	August 1979	6 November 1979	FMI	
Deputy Prime Minister for Revolutionary Affairs	Ebrahim Yazdi	13 February 1979	12 April 1979	FMI	
Deputy Prime Minister for Revolutionary Affairs	Mostafa Chamran	12 April 1979	29 September 1979	FMI	
Deputy Prime Minister for Transitional Affairs	Hashem Sabbaghian	13 February 1979	20 June 1979	FMI	
Minister of Interior	Ahmad Sayyed Javadi	13 February 1979	20 June 1979	FMI	
Minister of Interior	Hashem Sabbaghian	20 June 1979	6 November 1979	FMI	
Minister of Foreign Affairs	Karim Sanjabi	13 February 1979	1 April 1979	NF	
Minister of Foreign Affairs	Mehdi Bazargan^{A}	1 April 1979	12 April 1979	FMI	
Minister of Foreign Affairs	Ebrahim Yazdi	12 April 1979	12 November 1979	FMI	
Minister of Health	Kazem Sami	13 February 1979	29 October 1979	JAMA	
Minister of Agriculture	Ali-Mohammad Izadi	18 February 1979	6 November 1979	NF	
Minister of Information	Nasser Minachi	22 February 1979	6 November 1979	Independent	
Minister of Energy	Abbas Taj	18 February 1979	6 November 1979	IAE	
Minister of Post	Mohammad Hassan Eslami	22 February 1979	6 November 1979	FMI	
Minister of Finance	Ali Ardalan	15 February 1979	6 November 1979	NF	
Ministry of Housing	Mostafa Katiraei	13 February 1979	6 November 1979	IAE	
Minister of Labour	Dariush Forouhar	13 February 1979	29 September 1979	NF	
Minister of Labour	Ali Espahbodi	30 September 1979	6 November 1979	FMI	
Ministry of Roads	Yadollah Taheri	13 February 1979	6 November 1979	IAE	
Ministry of Industries	Mahmoud Ahmadzadeh	18 February 1979	6 November 1979	FMI	
Ministry of Commerce	Reza Sadr	18 February 1979	6 November 1979	FMI	
Minister of Culture	Ali Shariatmadari	5 February 1979	1 October 1979	JAMA	
Minister of Culture	Hassan Habibi	1 October 1979	6 November 1979	FMI	
Minister of Education	Gholam Hossein Shokouhi	22 February 1979	29 September 1979	Independent	
Minister of Education	Mohammad-Ali Rajai^{A}	29 September 1979	6 November 1979	FMI	
Minister of Justice	Asadollah Mobasheri	18 February 1979	20 June 1979	NF	
Minister of Justice	Ahmad Sayyed Javadi	20 June 1979	6 November 1979	FMI	
Minister of National Defense	Ahmad Madani	22 February 1979	2 March 1979	NF	
Minister of National Defense	Taghi Riahi	2 March 1979	18 September 1979	NF	
Minister of National Defense	Mostafa Chamran	30 September 1979	6 November 1979	FMI	
Minister of Petroleum	Ali Akbar Moinfar	29 September 1979	6 November 1979	IAE	
Minister without Portfolio for Revolutionary Projects	Yadollah Sahabi	18 February 1979	6 November 1979	FMI	
Minister without Portfolio for Plan and Budget	Ali Akbar Moinfar	13 February 1979	29 September 1979	IAE	
Minister without Portfolio for Plan and Budget	Ezzatollah Sahabi	29 September 1979	6 November 1979	FMI	
Minister without Portfolio for Provincial Inspection	Dariush Forouhar	29 September 1979	6 November 1979	NF	
Minister without Portfolio for Executive Affairs	Hossein Baniasadi	29 September 1979	6 November 1979	FMI	
Deputy Prime Minister for Physical Education	Hossein Shah-Hosseini	February 1979	6 November 1979	NF	
Deputy Prime Minister for Environment	Abbas Sami'i	February 1979	23 August 1979	FMI	

== Resignation ==
Bazargan and his entire cabinet resigned on 6 November 1979, just two days after a student group approved by Khomeini took sixty-six American Embassy officials hostage. In his resignation letter to Khomeini, Bazargan lamented that "repeated interferences, inconveniences, objections and disputes have made [The Interim Government] unable to continue [meeting its] duties."

Power then passed into the hands of the Council of the Islamic Revolution. Bazargan had been a supporter of the original revolutionary draft constitution rather than theocracy by Islamic jurist, and his resignation was received by Khomeini without protest, who stated that "Mr. Bazargan...was a little tired and preferred to stay on the sidelines for a while." Khomeini later described his appointment of Bazargan as a "mistake." Bazargan, on the other hand, described the government as a "knife without blade."

== See also ==
- Interim Government of Iran (1981)
- Iranian Revolution
- Iran hostage crisis

State of Iran
Preceded by Imperial State of Iran	Interim Government of Iran; 1979	Succeeded by Islamic Republic
Cabinet of Iran
Preceded by Cabinet of Bakhtiar	Cabinet of Bazargan; 1979	Succeeded by Interim Cabinet of Revolutionary Council
