= Rahmatollah Moghaddam Maraghei =

Iranian politician

- رحمت‌الله مقدم مراغه‌ای

Governor of East Azerbaijan Province
- In office December 1979
- In office February 1979 – June 1979

Member of Assembly of Experts for Constitution
- In office 15 August 1979 – 15 November 1979
- Constituency: East Azerbaijan Province
- Majority: 458,733 (51%)

Member of Parliament of Iran
- In office 22 February 1961 – 9 May 1961
- Constituency: Miandoab

Personal details
- Born: Tehran
- Died: Tehran
- Party: Radical Movement of Iran
- Other political affiliations: Muslim People's Republic Party (1979)

Rahmatollah Moghaddam Maraghei (Persian: رحمت‌الله مقدم مراغه‌ای) was an Iranian politician. A co-founder of the Iranian Writers' Association (IWA), he briefly served as a member of the parliament in the early 1960s, but was ousted for criticizing the Shah.

== Career ==
Following the Iranian Revolution, he was elected to the constituent assembly and was considered among the opposition bloc to the Islamic Republican Party. He went into hiding and fled the country after he was prosecuted for espionage.

He worked as an informant for the Central Intelligence Agency (CIA), under the cryptonym "SDProbe". According to C. Emery, he was a valuable asset for the agency due to his position as a governor and the connections he had among influential figures.

== External References/Links ==
- "Moghaddam-Maraghehie, Rahmatollah", Iranian Oral History Project collection, Harvard University
- Assembly of Experts for Constitution Profile

Party political offices
| New title Party established | Secretary of the Radical Movement of Iran; 1977–1980 | Vacant Party abolished |
