= Nasser Minachi =

Iranian government official (1931–2014)

- ناصر میناچی
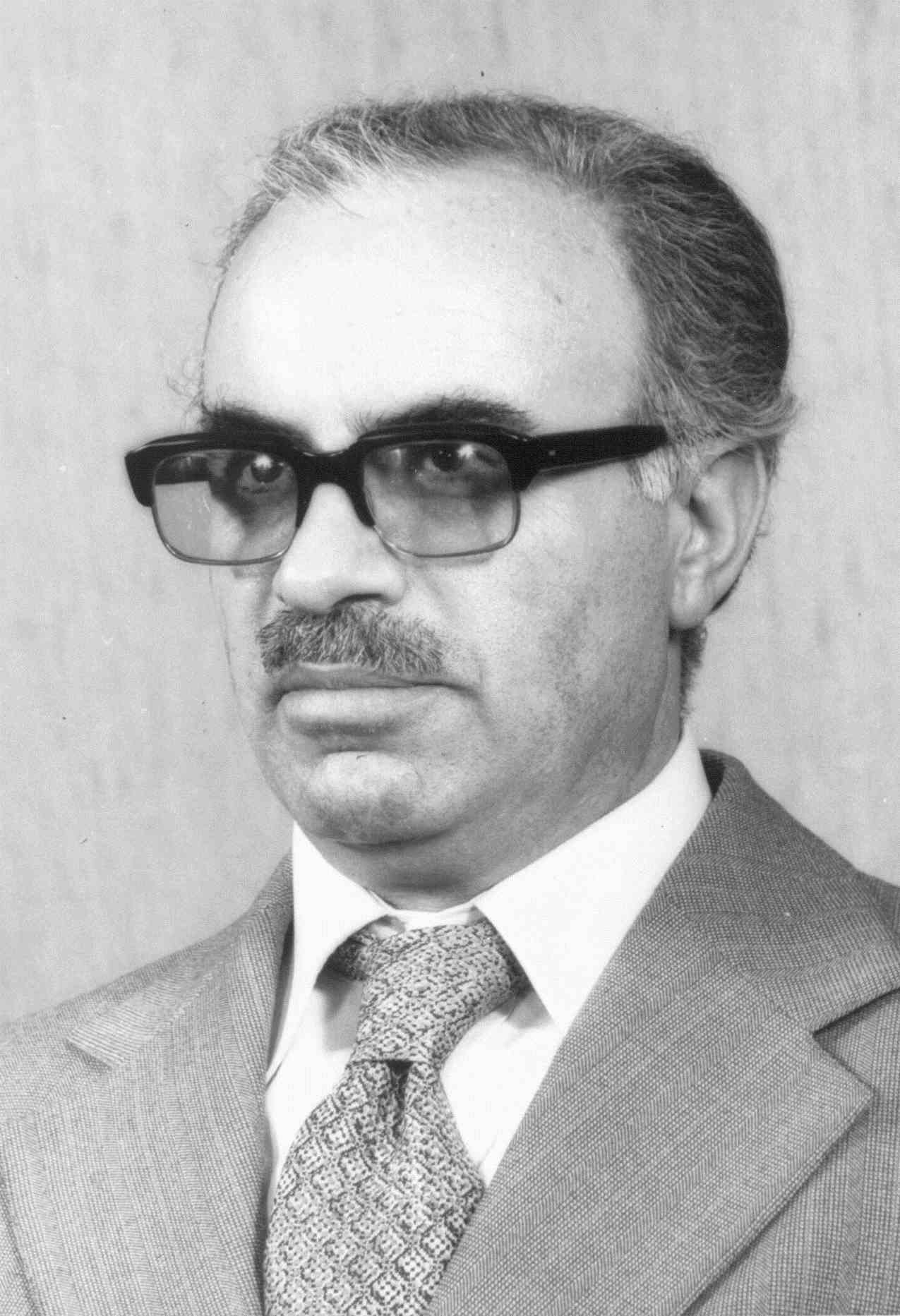

Minister of Tourism
- In office 22 February 1979 – 10 September 1980
- Prime Minister: Mahdi Bazargan
- Preceded by: Sirous Amouzgar (acting)
- Succeeded by: Abbas Duzduzani

Personal details
- Born: 1931 Tehran, Pahlavi Iran
- Died: 25 January 2014 (aged 83) Tehran, Islamic Republic of Iran

Nasser Minachi (1931–25 January 2014) was an Iranian activist and founder of Hosseiniyeh Ershad, a modernist Islamic institution. He served as the minister of tourism and then the minister of information and publicity in the Interim Government of Iran after the regime change in 1979. He was also the minister of culture in the government during the presidency of Abolhassan Banisadr.

== Career and activities ==
Minachi was one of the bazaar leaders during the reign of Mohammad Reza Pahlavi and cofounded the Hosseiniyeh Ershad, a nontraditional Islamic organization in Tehran. He served as the caretaker of the institution until his death. He was also an opposition leader at that time. He had a moderate oppositional approach and was serving as the director of committee for the defense of human rights. Just before the regime change in February 1979 Minachi was also spokesperson of the a group consisting of moderate Islamic nationalists led by Mahdi Bazargan.

He was appointed tourism minister to the interim government of Mahdi Bazargan in February 1979. He was also made the minister of information and publicity in the same cabinet on 22 February that year. He was also a member of the revolutionary council until November 1979.

The occupiers of the US embassy in Tehran called for Minachi's arrest while he was serving as information minister. They accused Minachi of being a CIA agent. Minachi was eventually arrested in his home by the militants in early February 1980. He was freed soon with the intervention of Bazargan.

Later Minachi became the minister of culture and national guidance under the presidency of Abolhassan Banisadr.

== Death ==
Minachi died of heart failure on 25 January 2014 in Tehran. His memorial service was held in the Hosseiniyeh Ershad mosque.
