= Abdolkarim Lahiji =

Iranian politician

Abdolkarim Lahidji
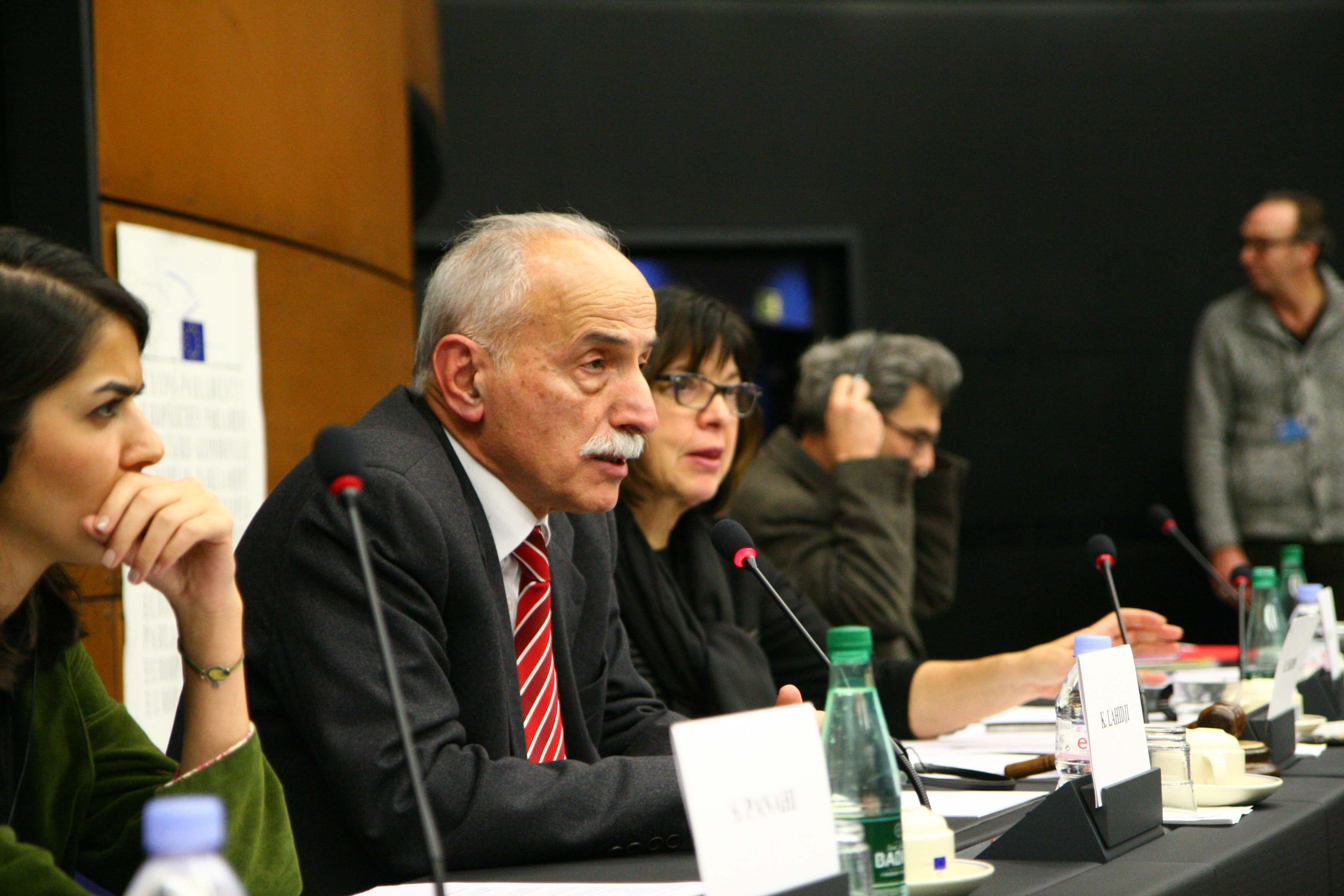
- Lahidji in 2012
- Born: 1940 (age 85–86); Tehran, Iran
- Education: University of Tehran
- Occupation: Lawyer
- Organization(s): International Federation for Human Rights; Iranian Committee for the Defense of Freedom and Human Rights (1977–1980)
- Movement: Civil rights

Abdolkarim Lahidji (Persian: عبدالکریم لاهیجی) is an Iranian lawyer and human rights activist.

He was elected as the president of the International Federation for Human Rights in 2013, having previously served as the vice-president from 1998 to 2013, and is the president of the League for the Defense of Human Rights in Iran since 1983. Lahidji is a former Confederation of Iranian Students activist and was the student representative in the National Front during 1960s.

== Electoral history ==
Year	Election	Votes	%	Rank	Notes
1979	Assembly of Experts	179,798	7.11	14th	Lost
1980	Parliament	369,688	17.3	49th	Lost
