= Association for Defense of Freedom and the Sovereignty of the Iranian Nation =

Iranian Political Organization

- Abbreviation: ADFSIN
- Formation: March 1986
- Founder: Mehdi Bazargan
- Chairman: Ali Ardalan

The Association for Defense of Freedom and the Sovereignty of the Iranian Nation (Persian: جمعیت دفاع از آزادی و حاکمیت ملت ایران) was an Iranian political organization founded at the end of the winter of 1986.

== Platform ==
The organization's "liberal-minded" members called for the rule of law and respect for civil liberties. The group publicly sided against resuming Iran-Iraq war.

== Ties to other political organizations ==
A 1999 Human Rights Watch report describes the organization as an "affiliate" of the Freedom Movement of Iran, while a German source refers to it as an "ally". According to Asghar Schirazi, the organization served as a "focal point" for members of the Freedom Movement and the National Front who were based in Iran. JAMA cooperated with the group.

== Prosecution ==
The government refused to allow the group to operate freely and prosecuted the members for their activities. Despite applying for legal permission soon after its establishment, the interior ministry rejected the request. During the United Nations Special Rapporteur on Human Rights in Iran official visit to Iran in January 1990, an official told him despite lack of a legal permission, "they criticize the Government and no one interferes with them." In June 1990, the group sent an open letter, signed by 90 activists, to President Akbar Hashemi Rafsanjani, criticizing his policies and the "lack of implementation of rights and freedoms guaranteed by the Constitution of the Islamic Republic of Iran". Consequently, after many of its members were arrested, on 14 June 1990 the government ordered dissolution of the association. Amnesty International documented arrest of more than 20 people linked to the group, and designated them as prisoners of conscience who were detained for their non-violent political activity.
