= Islamic Association of Engineers =

Professional association based in Tehran, Iran

- انجمن اسلامی مهندسین
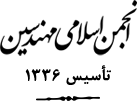
- Formation: 1957
- Type: not-for-profit non-governmental organization
- Headquarters: Tehran, Iran
- Key people: Abolfazl Bazargan, Head of Central Council; Alireza Hendi, Head of Executive Committee
- Website: iaiengineers.org

The Islamic Association of Engineers (Persian: انجمن اسلامی مهندسین, romanized: anǰoman-e eslāmī-ye mohandesīn) is a civic and professional association in Iran founded in 1957.

The organization is a platform for Islamic modernist activists and a forum for debating key issues among them. It holds regular meetings, lectures and research and turns them into books.

Mehdi Bazargan and Ezzatollah Sahabi were among its founders. Alongside Islamic Association of Students, the organization was active against outreach of Marxist ideology before Iranian Revolution and was one of the professional bodies that served as a platform for religious activism, playing an important role in shaping the Islamic ideology of the revolution. Ali Shariati was among occasional lecturers at the organization. A number of leading members in the association held government portfolios during Interim Government of Iran.
