= Asadollah Mobasheri =

Iranian judge, politician, journalist, poet and translator (1909–1990)

- اسدالله مبشری
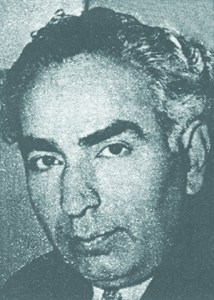
- Asadollah Mobasheri

Minister of Justice
- In office 11 February 1979 – 20 June 1979
- Prime Minister: Mehdi Bazargan
- Preceded by: Yahya Sadeq Vaziri
- Succeeded by: Ahmad Sayyed Javadi

Personal details
- Born: 1909 Tehran, Sublime State of Iran
- Died: 1990 (aged 80–81) Tehran, Iran
- Education: Tehran School of Law and Political Science

Asadollah Mobasheri Sohri Behzadi or Assadollah Mobashery (Persian: اسدالله مبشری خورشیدی بهزادی; 1909–1990) was an Iranian judge, politician, journalist, poet, and translator of Goethe, Henry Corbin, and Karl Jaspers from French into Persian.

He was for a short period of time Minister of Justice at the first and only democratic cabinet after the 1979 Iranian Revolution. He was arrested and imprisoned at the time of the Shah and the Islamic Republic both because of his activities for the human rights.
