= Mahmoud Taleghani =

Iranian theologian (1911–1979)

Ayatollah Seyyed Mahmoud Taleghani
- محمود طالقانی
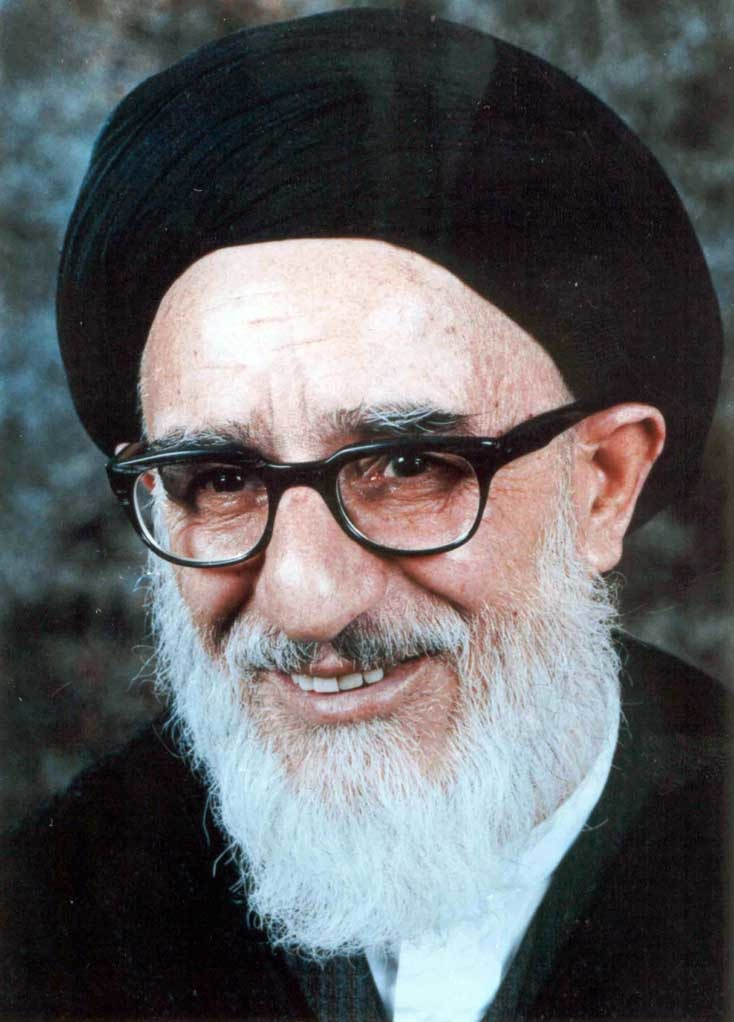
- Taleghani in 1979

Head of Council of the Islamic Revolution
- In office 1 May 1979 – 9 September 1979
- Preceded by: Morteza Motahhari
- Succeeded by: Mohammad Beheshti

Member of the Assembly of Experts for Constitution
- In office 15 August 1979 – 9 September 1979
- Constituency: Tehran Province
- Majority: 2,016,801 (79.3%)

Tehran's Friday Prayer Imam
- In office 27 July 1979 – 9 September 1979
- Appointed by: Ruhollah Khomeini
- Preceded by: Hassan Emami
- Succeeded by: Hussein-Ali Montazeri

Personal details
- Born: Mahmoud Alaei Taleghani; 5 March 1911 Geliyard, Iran
- Died: 9 September 1979 (aged 68) Tehran, Iran
- Resting place: Behesht-e-Zahra
- Party: Freedom Movement of Iran (1961–1979); National Front (1951–1961)
- Children: 10, including Vahideh and Azam
- Theological work
- Religion: Islam
- Denomination: Twelver Shīʿā
- School: Jaʿfari
- Main interests: Tafsir
- Years active: 1921–1979
- Alma mater: Najaf Seminary; Feyziyeh Seminary
- Taught at: Sepahsalar School
- Influenced: Ali Shariati, Azam Taleghani
- Influenced by: Mirza Shariat Sangalaji, Muhammad Husayn Tabataba'i, Muhammad Abduh
- Taleghani's voice Taleghani speaking at the twelfth death anniversary of Mohammad Mosaddegh in Tehran, Iran; Recorded 5 March 1979

Mahmoud Alaei Taleghani (Persian: محمود علایی طالقانی,, also romanized as Mahmūd Tāleqānī; 5 March 1911 – 9 September 1979) was an Iranian Ayatollah, theologian, Muslim reformer, democracy advocate, a senior Shia Islamic scholar and thinker of Iran, and a leader in his own right of the movement against Shah Mohammad Reza Pahlavi. A founding member of the Freedom Movement of Iran, he has been described as a representative of the tendency of many "Shia clerics to blend Shia with Marxist ideals in order to compete with leftist movements for youthful supporters" during the 1960s and 1970s. His greatest influence has been said to have been in his teaching of Quranic exegesis, as many later revolutionaries were his students.

== Biography and education ==
Taleghani was born to a religious family in the village of Geliyard of Taleqan County in Alborz Province on 5 March 1911. His father Abu'l-Hasan Taleghani, who had published a magazine called Balagh in the context of the Kashf-e hijab protests at the time of Reza Shah, taught him Islamic sciences. Taleghani continued his studies in Qom, studying the same subject at the Razaviya and Feyziyeh schools. He obtained his Ijtihad Certification from his teachers, Abu l-Hasan al-Isfahani, Abdul-Karim Ha'eri Yazdi and Mirza Muhammad Shari'at-Sanglaji there.

== Political activities ==
=== Before the Iranian Revolution ===
In 1938, he went to Tehran to preach and lecture on Islam and was arrested and imprisoned the next year for opposing the regime of Reza Shah. From 1948 onward, he held classes at Hedayat Mosque in Tehran. He traveled abroad to Jordan and Egypt in 1951 and 1952, to the Peoples Muslim Congress in Karachi, and twice to Jerusalem as the head of an Iranian delegation to the annual Islamic Congress of Quds. He supported Mohammed Mosaddeq's nationalization of the oil industry. Following the 1953 Iranian coup d'état that overthrew Mossaedegh and restored the Shah he was arrested and – according to the Islamic Republic's IRIB website – "accused of hiding Navvab Safavi, the founder and leader of the Fadayan-e Islam" Islamist assassination group.

Politically active from his student days, Taleghani was a veteran in the struggle against the Pahlavi regime. He was imprisoned on several occasions over the decades, "as a young preacher, as a mid-ranking cleric, and as a senior religious leader just before the revolution," and served a total of a dozen years in prison. In prison he met many leftist political prisoners and was fond of talking about his interactions with leftists. The influence of the left on his thinking was reflected in his book Islam and Ownership (Islam va Malekiyat) which argued in support of collective ownership "as if it were an article of faith in Islam." He helped found the National Resistance Movement in 1957 and along with Mehdi Bazargan, Yadollah Sahabi, and Ali Shariati he founded the Iran Freedom Movement in May 1961. In 1971, he exiled to Zabol, a city in Sistan and Baluchestan Province and then to Baft, a city of Kerman Province. Between 1964 and 1978 he spent nearly a decade in jail. Altogether he spent nearly 15 years behind bars. Finally, Taleghani after the rise of the Islamic Revolution in November 1978 was released.

=== In the Iranian Revolution ===
Although not as influential as Ayatollah Ruhollah Khomeini, Taleghani was instrumental in shaping the movement that led to the Iranian Revolution and brought Khomeini to power. During the Islamic Revolution he became chairman of the Revolutionary Council, Iran's chief ruling body, a fact not revealed until his death. He became the first Imam for Friday prayer in Tehran after the fall of Iran's interim government in July 1979.

Taleghani was known for his tolerance and served as Khomeini's mediator in disputes with the Kurds and other dissident groups. He also had differences with Khomeini, which led to a clash between them in April 1979. "To popular acclaim, Taleghani warned then against a 'return to despotism.'" Two of Taleghani's sons were arrested by revolutionary Guards, but thousands of his supporters marched in the streets chanting "Taleghani, you are the soul of the revolution! Down with the reactionaries!" Khomeini summoned Taleghani to Qom where he was given a severe dressing-down after which the press was called. Khomeini told the press: "Mr. Taleghani is with us and he is sorry for what happened." Khomeini pointedly never referred to him as Ayatollah Taleghani.

== Opinions ==
Taleghani argued that colonization was a primary reason of totalitarianism and dictatorship in different countries. While not an ultimate aim per se, nationalism was seen as an instrument of anti-colonialist practices. Taleghani promoted resistance against Israel, and frequently visited the region.

On 20 April 1979, it was broadcast on television interview by Taleghani that "The leadership of Ayatollah Khomeini is not only accepted by me but the world has accepted it. He is the source of belief, sincerity, determination and honesty. I have always approved of his struggles, his words and his projects".

There is an important place for rationality in Taleghani's thought. According to him, every judgment in Islam has a reason. Also, Islam is seen in his sermons and writings as a religion that set up progressive rules in societal and individual life.

According to Taleghani, the redaction of Quran occurred under the caliphate of the first Caliph Ali. Taleghani also emphasized the continuous form of the Quran, and the strict relation between the verses of the Quran.

His tafsir, or Quranic commentary, was innovative in language and clearly designed to appeal to a wide audience, with the use of narrations and juridical reports. Taleghani insisted that believers have to contemplate the meaning of the verses of the Quran. He also sought to translate and explain the Nahj al-Balagha against the grain of contemporary social analyses and phenomena.

== Death ==
Taleghani died on 9 September 1979. Two sons of Taleghani claimed that he was murdered but this claim was not proven. His mysterious death and lifetime achievements were the occasion of huge crowds and much emotion before and during his funeral, and was said to be "a blow to moderation and progressive thought" in the revolution.

He has been described as a "chain smoker" and having a "gaunt face with a serious demeanor."

Ayatollah Ruhollah Khomeini described him "Abu Dhar al-Ghifari in the time" in the message on the occasion of his death: "He was for Islam, Abuzar of the time. His expressive tongue was as trenchant and pounding as the sword of Malik al-Ashtar."

== Works ==
- A shining ray from Quran, it was written while he was imprisoned by Muhammad Reza Pahlavi.
- Introduction - explanation on Tanbih Al-Omah va Tanzih Al-Mellah
- Islam and Ownership
- Translation of the first volume of Imam Ali Ibn Abi Talib's Book
- A light of Nahj-ul-Balaq
- Authority and Judicial Decree
- Freedom and Despotism
- Unity Lesson
- A Lesson from Quran
- Days and Lectures
- Sermons of Friday Prayers

== Notes ==
Political offices
Preceded by Morteza Motahari	President of Council of Islamic Revolution; 1979	Succeeded by Abolhassan Banisadr
Religious titles
Preceded by Hassan Emami	Friday prayers Imam of Tehran; 1979	Succeeded by Hussein-Ali Montazeri
