= Azam Taleghani =

Iranian politician and journalist (1943–2019)

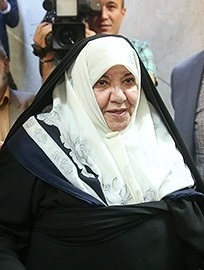

Member of the Parliament of Iran
- In office 28 May 1980 – 28 May 1984
- Constituency: Tehran, Rey and Shemiranat
- Majority: 1,108,653 (51.9%)

Personal details
- Born: 1943 Tehran, Imperial State of Iran
- Died: 30 October 2019 (aged 75–76) Tehran, Iran
- Party: Society of Women of the Islamic Revolution
- Other political affiliations: Council of Nationalist-Religious Activists of Iran
- Spouse: Morteza Eghtesad (died 2017)
- Children: Akram, Abbas, Sadegh, Kazem
- Relatives: Mahmoud Taleghani (father)
- Profession: politician, journalist

Azam Taleghani (Persian: اعظم طالقانی; 1943 – 30 October 2019) was an Iranian politician and journalist who was the head of the Society of Islamic Revolution Women of Iran, editor of Payam-e-Hajar weekly, and a member of the Iranian parliament.

== Early life ==
Born in Iran, Taleghani was the daughter of Ayatollah Mahmoud Taleghani. She served time in prison during the Pahlavi regime. After the Iranian Revolution she was a member of the Iranian parliament, founded "Jame'e Zanan Mosalman" (Society of Muslim women), and published Payam e Hajar Weekly, an Islamic journal about women and women's rights. In 2003 she protested against the death of Zahra Kazemi. Both in 2001 and 2009, Taleghani submitted her candidacy for Iran's presidential elections, but, like all women's candidacies, her candidacy was rejected by Iran's Guardian Council.

Her political ideals espoused a "progressive brand of revolutionary Islamism."

== Electoral history ==
Year	Election	Votes	%	Rank	Notes
1979	Assembly of Experts	132,430	5.24	17th	Lost
1980	Parliament	1,108,653	51.9	16th	Won
1997	President	—N/a			Disqualified
1999	City Council of Tehran	—N/a			Disqualified
2001	President	—N/a			Disqualified
2005	President	—N/a			Disqualified
2009	President	—N/a			Disqualified
2017	President	—N/a			Disqualified

Party political offices
New title	Secretary-General of the Society of Women of the Islamic Revolution; 1979–2019	Succeeded by Tahereh Taleghani
