= Freedom Movement of Iran =

Political opposition party in Iran

Freedom Movement of Iran نهضت آزادی ايران
- Secretary-General: Mohammad Tavasoli
- Head of Political office: Ghaffar Farzadi
- Head of Youth Wing: Emad Bahavar
- Founders: List: Mehdi Bazargan; Mahmoud Taleghani; Yadollah Sahabi; Hasan Nazih; Mansour Ataei; Rahim Ataei; Abbas Radnia; Abbas Sami'i; Abbas Sheybani; Ahmad Alibabaei; Ezzatollah Sahabi; Ahmad Sadr Haj Sayyed Javadi; Abroad: Ali Shariati (France); Ebrahim Yazdi (United States); Mostafa Chamran (United States); Sadeq Qotbzadeh (United States); Sadeq Tabatabaei (Germany)
- Founded: 17 May 1961; 65 years ago
- Split from: National Front
- Newspaper: Mizan; Payam-e-Mojahed; Internal Publication
- Ideology: Mosaddeghism; Liberalism (Iranian); Islamic liberalism; Islamic democracy
- Political position: Centre-left
- Religion: Islam
- National affiliation: National Front (1961–1965)
- Parliament: 0 / 290

Website
- https://nehzateazadi.org/

The Freedom Movement of Iran (FMI) or Liberation Movement of Iran (LMI; Persian: نهضت آزادی ايران, romanized: Nahżat-e āzādi-e Irān) is an Iranian pro-democracy political organization founded in 1961, by members describing themselves as "Muslims, Iranians, Constitutionalists and Mossadeghists". It is the oldest party still active in Iran and has been described as a "semi-opposition" or "loyal opposition" party. It has also been described as a "religious nationalist party".

The organization was split from the National Front, its establishment was supported by Mohammad Mossadegh. It then applied for the membership in the front with a platform advocating national sovereignty, freedom of political activity and expression, social justice under Islam, respect for Iran's constitution, the Universal Declaration of Human Rights, and the Charter of the United Nations. It believes in the separation of religion and state, while that political activity should be guided by religious values. FMI based on a moderate interpretation of Islam. It rejects both royal and clerical dictatorship in favor of political and economic liberalism.

Despite being outlawed by the prevailing government in Iran, the group continues to exist. The organization accepts to comply with the Constitution of the Islamic Republic of Iran despite its rejection for Guardianship of the Islamic Jurist. It had not been allowed to run in any election since 1980 (exempting 2003 local elections in which the Guardian Council did not vet the candidates). It was also denied membership in the House of Parties of Iran.

The organization's members have close ties to the Council of Nationalist-Religious Activists of Iran.

== 1953 Coup d'etat and aftermath ==
The group originated in the early 1950s, after the 1953 coup d'état against the government of Dr. Mohammad Mossadeq who was Prime Minister of Iran from April 1951 to August 1953 (with a very brief interruption in July 1952). That coup brought down Mossadegh and his colleagues from power and reinstalled the Shah as the dominant force in Iranian politics. The newly installed government quickly rounded up Mossadegh's closest supporters, outlawing freedom of expression and cracking down on free political activity. Mossadegh himself was placed before a military court and sentenced to three years in prison. A group of low-ranking leaders from the Mossadegh era quickly formed an underground organization calling itself the National Resistance Movement (NRM). It is significant in the context of the FMI's history because this reincarnation of the National Front (the umbrella group for Mossadegh's supporters) was constituted mainly of religious laymen, which differentiated it from the secular members of the banned National Front, including Mossadegh himself. The NRM campaigned for the 1954 Majlis to be free and fair (they were not) and attempted to restore the constitutional monarchy (which also did not occur). Failing to achieve its aims and facing the power repressive apparatus of the Shah's regime, the group disbanded in the mid-1950s.

== Early 1960s: The creation of the Freedom Movement ==
In 1960, the Second National Front was formed, which mostly involved figures from the early 1950s during Mossadegh's time in office. However, in 1961, Mehdi Bazargan, Mahmud Taleghani, Yadollah Sahabi (all prominent liberals) broke away to form a more religious (and radical) counterpart to the National Front. This new group quickly gained a large following exceeding that of their rival and its leaders advocated civil disobedience such as protests, sit-ins and strikes as a way of pressuring the Shah to reinstitute democratic rule. But, after a brief period of reform under Prime Minister Ali Amini, the government cracked down on dissent. In June 1963, a massive uprising occurred in five Iranian cities over the arrest of Ayatollah Ruhollah Khomeini, a radical cleric who had been making inflammatory statements concerning the government of the Shah and his allegedly anti-Islamic policies. Faced with this, the government sent in the army infantry and tanks to crush the riots, which resulted in at least hundreds (some believe thousands) of deaths. Because the FMI had supported the uprising, their group was singled out for harassment and made to disappear by the mid-1960s. But, in 1964, the FMI (along with other parties) helped to form (with Mossadegh's blessings) the Third National Front which, like the FMI, took a more active and radical stance toward the Shah's government compared to that of the more cautious Second National Front. By 1965, all legal forms of dissidence had been done away with, leaving armed violence as the only means of inflicting some sort of damage on the government.

== Events leading to the Islamic Revolution (1965–1979) ==
Throughout the 1960s and 1970s, the FMI operated mostly outside in the country, mainly in the United States and Europe. The seemingly omnipresent nature of SAVAK (the Shah's secret police force, allegedly responsible for executing, imprisoning and torturing tens of thousands of political inmates) and the stifling police state atmosphere discouraged any sort of major activity inside Iran. Until the mid-1970s, those Iranians who had actively opposed the Shah had been mainly of left-wing or liberal background, with the former dominating by far. But beginning in that decade, thanks partly to the FMI, the religious elements (including the mullahs) began to dominate the movement. They were able to do this because the Islamic movement had a network of over 9,000 mosques, 180,000 mullahs and millions of pious followers in Iran and it could freely operate, unlike the left-wing elements who were mercilessly crushed by SAVAK, the police and the government's military apparatus. In January 1978, the pro-government newspaper Ettelaat published an article accusing Khomeini of being, among other things, a reactionary and British agent. This led to an uprising in the holy city of Qom and the uprising soon spread to Tabriz, Tehran and other major cities. By the end of 1978, the government of the Shah (once touted as possessing the fifth largest military force on Earth) had all but collapsed under the weight of massive uprisings and workers' strikes. In response to the Shah's appointment of Shapour Bakhtiar as prime minister, Khomeini appointed Mehdi Bazargan as head of the provisional government (which was not yet in power). On 11 February 1979, the government fell and what became known as the Islamic Republic of Iran took its place.

== Islamic Republic of Iran (1979–present) ==
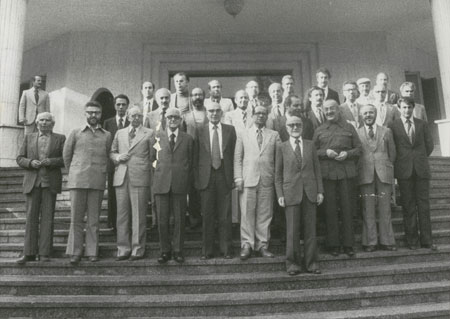
Cabinet of Mehdi Bazargan (Interim Government of Iran)

The Islamic Republic of Iran was proclaimed on 1 April 1979 after the results of a referendum in which allegedly more than 98% voted for this system. The Provisional Government took office on 12 February, right after the former government fell, but it quickly became apparent that this government lacked any real power, which was instead concentrated in the Islamic Revolutionary Council (which was dominated by hard-line religious fundamentalists) and the local Islamic Komitehs (committees). The PG was composed mainly of elements from the FMI (including Bazargan, Taleghani, Sahabi, Yazdi, Nazih), but also included a few leaders of the National Front (Sanjabi, Ardalan, Forouhar). This period expressed the height of the LMI's influence over Iranian politics, but it was not to last. By Aug. 1979, the new government was clamping down on dissent, outlawing nearly all political parties and instituting a campaign of terror against its critics. The Bazargan cabinet resigned en masse on 5 November 1979, and thus, ended the Interim Government of Iran.

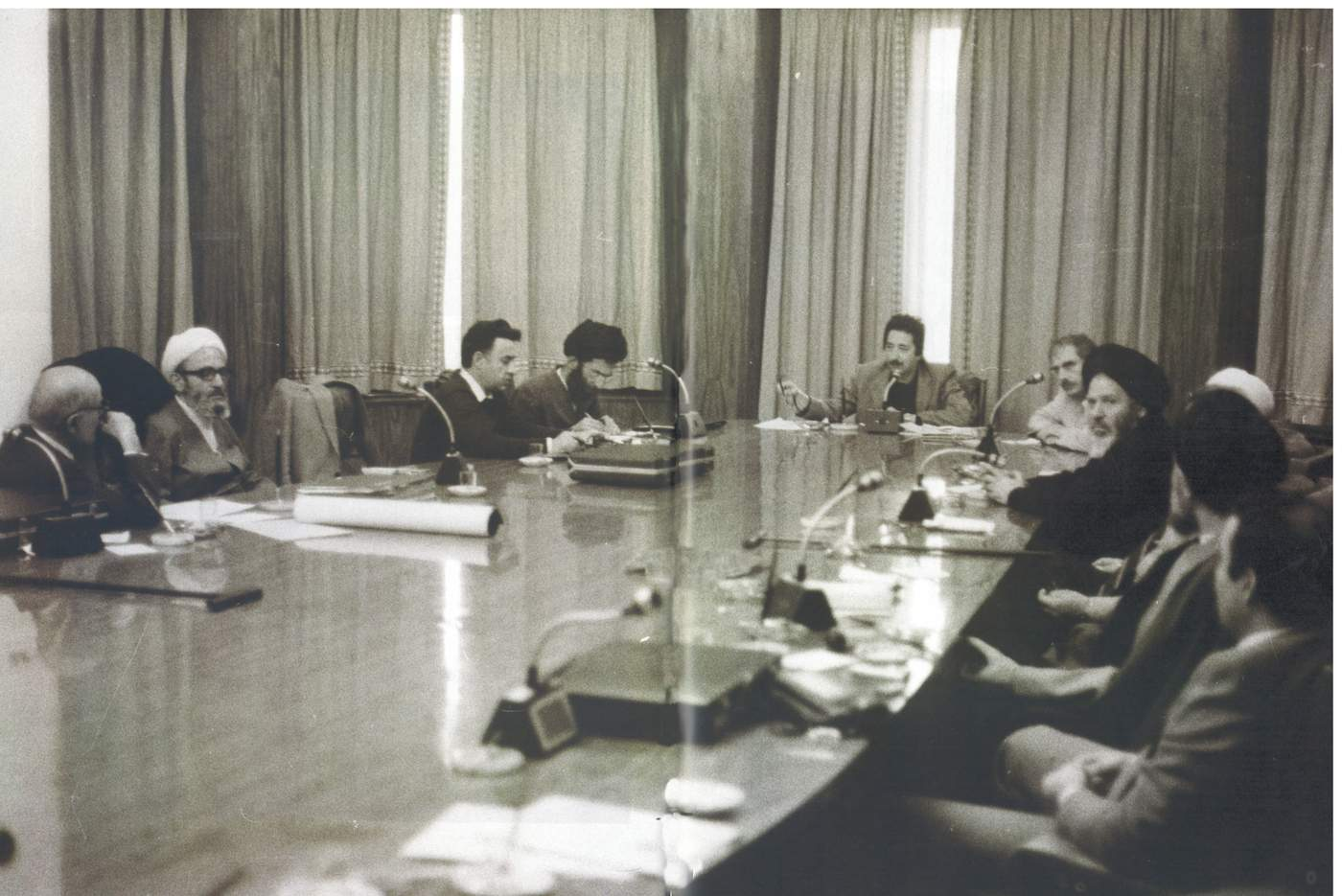
Islamic Revolutionary Council members meeting, left to right: Bazargan, Mahdavi Kani, Sahabi, Khamenei, Banisadr, Habibi, Mousavi Ardebili

The Islamic government (led by Ayatollah Khomeini) crushed all dissent in the country so that the oppositionists, both real and potential, either fled abroad or were murdered or imprisoned. But the LMI continued to exist as a barely tolerated force in the Majlis, where it called for an early end to the war with Iraq in 1984 (the war had started in September 1980 when Iraqi forces, under the orders of Saddam Hussein, invaded Iran).

In 20 Jan 1995, Bazargan died (of natural causes) and Ebrahim Yazdi took over as leader of the organization, which held until his death in 2017. The group continued to exist as a tolerated party until the government cracked down on it in the year 2000, arresting and placing on trial dozens of activists belonging to the group, making the party non-operational. Since the election of Hasan Rouhani as the president of Iran in 2013, FMI experienced a new era of political activity. On 27 August 2017, Ibrahim Yazdi died due to cancer and Mohammad Tavasoli became the third secretary-general of FMI.

== Leadership ==
Secretary-General
#	Name	Tenure		Ref
#	Name	From	To	Ref
1	Mehdi Bazargan	1961	1995	
2	Ebrahim Yazdi	1995	2017	
3	Mohammad Tavasoli	2017	Present	

Head of Political office
#	Name	Tenure		Ref
#	Name	From	To	Ref
1	Mohammad Tavasoli	Unknown	1978	
2	Abbas Amir-Entezam	1978	1979	
3	Ebrahim Yazdi	1979	1995	
4	Mohammad Tavasoli	1995	2017	

== Imprisonment of FMI members ==
Imprisonment of FMI Members
No	Name	Family	Number of Those Arrested		Years of Imprisonment		Total No. of Those Arrested	Total Years of Imprisonment
No	Name	Family	Pahlavi	IRI	Pahlavi	IRI	Total No. of Those Arrested	Total Years of Imprisonment
1	Abbas	Sheybani	9	0	10.2	0	9	10.2
2	Abbas	Radnia	2	0	2.0	0	2	2.0
3	Abbas-Ali	Moslehi	0	1	0	0.04	1	0.04
4	Abdolali	Bazargan	0	2	0	3.0	2	3.0
5	Abolfazl	Hakimi	3	0	4.3	0	3	4.3
6	Abolfazl	Bazargan	0	1	0	0.9	1	0.9
7	Ahad	Rezaei	0	6	0	3.0	6	3.0
8	Ahmad	Alibabaei	1	0	6.0	0	1	6.0
9	Ahmad	Haj Sayyed Javadi	0	1	0	0.03	1	0.03
10	Ali	Ghofrani	0	1	0	0.1	1	0.1
11	Ali	Alizadeh	0	3	0	1.1	3	1.1
12	Ali	Shariati	2	0	3.3	0	2	3.3
13	Ali-Asghar	Gharavi	0	7	0	1.8	7	1.8
14	Amir	Khorram	0	3	0	6.0	3	6.0
15	Amir-Hossein	Kazemi	0	1	0	0.8	1	0.8
16	Bagher	Alavi	0	2	0	0.2	2	0.2
17	Ebrahim	Yazdi	0	3	0	1.2	3	1.2
18	Emad	Behavar	0	4	0	5.0	4	5.0
19	Ezzatollah	Sahabi	3	2	10.8	1.3	5	12.2
20	Farid	Taheri	0	2	0	3.2	2	3.2
21	Fereshteh	Bazargan	0	1	0	0	1	0.03
22	Ghaffar	Farzadi	0	4	0	0.5	4	0.5
23	Hashem	Sabbaghian	2	4	0.5	3.8	6	4.3
24	Jafar	Ganji	0	2	0	4.2	2	4.2
25	Khosrow	Mansourian	0	4	0	5.1	4	5.1
26	Mahmoud	Taleghani	4	0	11.3	0	4	11.3
27	Mehdi	Bazargan	3	0	6.7	0	3	6.7
28	Mehdi	Motamedi	0	3	0	5.3	3	5.3
29	Mohammad	Bastenegar	1	0	4.0	0	1	4.0
30	Mohammad	Tavassoli	1	5	1.0	4.3	6	5.3
31	Mohammad-Ali	Rajai	1	0	0.1	0	1	0.1
32	Mohammad-Hadi	Hadizadeh	0	1	0	0.3	1	0.3
33	Mohammad-Hossein	Bani Asadi	1	2	0.6	1.7	3	2.3
34	Mohammad-Mehdi	Jafari	1	0	4.0	0	1	4.0
35	Mohsen	Mohagheghi	0	2	0	5.5	2	5.5
36	Morteza	Eshfagh	0	1	0.0	0.4	1	0.4
37	Mostafa	Meskin	0	2	0.0	0.5	2	0.5
38	Mostafa	Mofidi	1	0	0	0.4	1	0.4
39	Rahim	Ataei	1	0	0.5	0	1	0.5
40	Yadollah	Sahabi	1	0	4.0	0	1	4.0
TOTAL
TOTAL			37	70	69.2	59.6	107	128.8

== See also ==
- Iranian Committee for the Defense of Freedom and Human Rights (1977–1980)
- Eponym Group (1980)
- Association for Defense of Freedom and the Sovereignty of the Iranian Nation (1986–1990)
- Front for Democracy and Human Rights (2005)

Splinter groups

- People's Mujahedin of Iran (1965)
- Council of Nationalist-Religious Activists of Iran (2000)
