= Mehdi Bazargan =

Iranian politician and activist (1907–1995)

- مهدی بازرگان
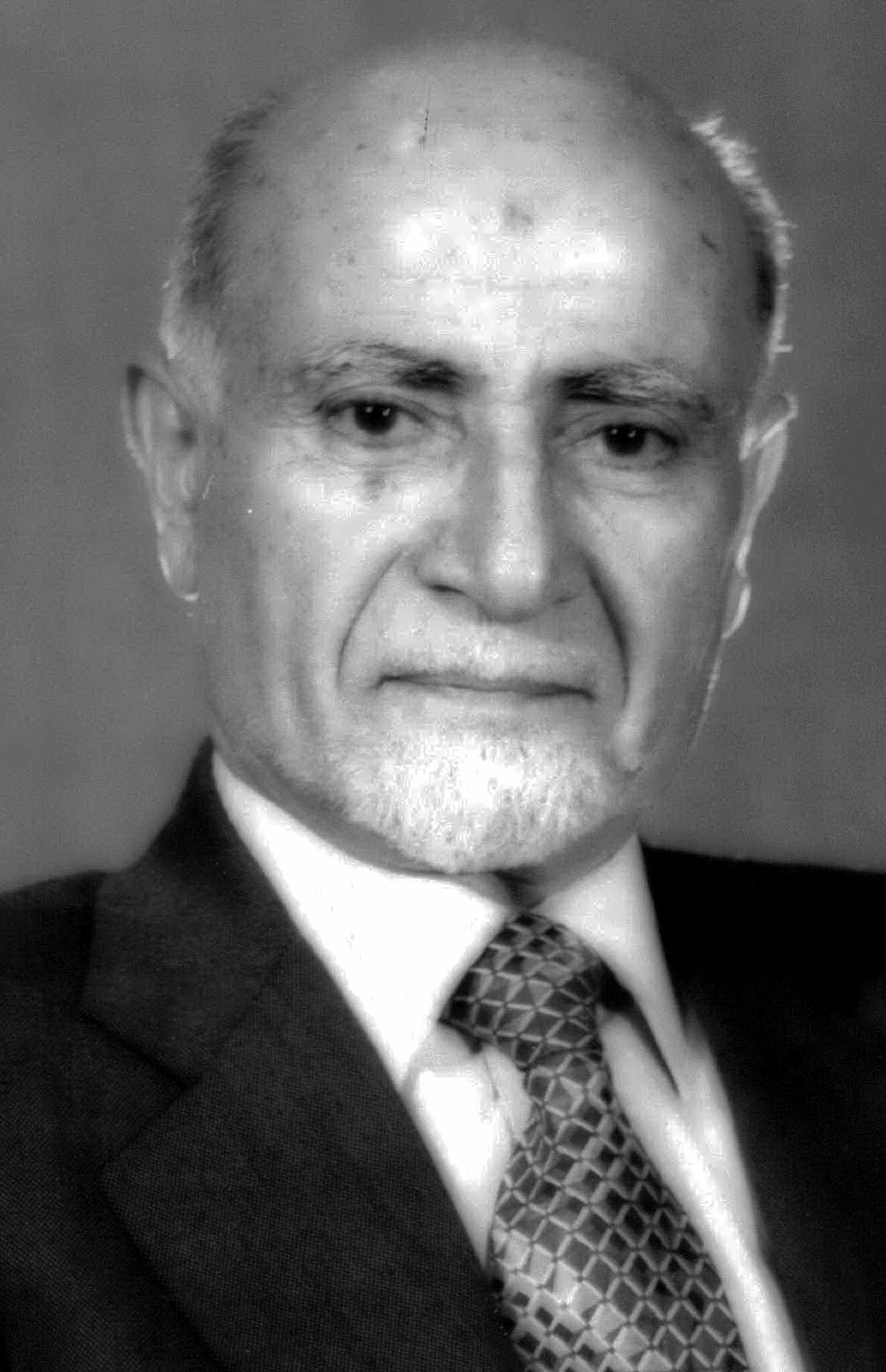
- Bazargan in 1979

41st Prime Minister of Iran
- In office 4 February 1979 (Note: The office was disputed between him and Shapour Bakhtiar from 4 to 11 February 1979.) – 6 November 1979
- Appointed by: Ruhollah Khomeini
- Monarch: Mohammad Reza Pahlavi (Note: Until February 11, 1979.)
- Preceded by: Shapour Bakhtiar
- Succeeded by: Mohammad-Ali Rajai (1980)

Minister of Foreign Affairs Acting
- In office 1 April 1979 – 12 April 1979
- Prime Minister: Himself
- Preceded by: Karim Sanjabi
- Succeeded by: Ebrahim Yazdi

Member of the Parliament of Iran
- In office 28 May 1980 – 28 May 1984
- Constituency: Tehran, Rey and Shemiranat
- Majority: 1,447,316 (68%)

Personal details
- Born: Mehdi Bazargan; 1 September 1907 Tehran, Qajar Iran
- Died: 20 January 1995 (aged 87) Zürich, Switzerland
- Resting place: Fatima Masumeh Shrine, Qom, Iran
- Party: Freedom Movement of Iran (1961–1995); National Front (1949–1961); Iran Party (1941–1946)
- Other political affiliations: ADFSIN (1986–1990); Eponym Group (1980); ICDFHR (1977–1979)
- Spouse: Malak Tabatabai
- Children: 5, including Abdolali
- Education: École Centrale Paris; Lycée Clemenceau

Military service
- Allegiance: Imperial State of Iran
- Years of service: 1935–1937

Mehdi Bazargan (Persian: مهدی بازرگان; 1 September 1907 – 20 January 1995) was an Iranian scholar, academic, long-time pro-democracy activist and head of Iran's interim government. He was described as a progressive and modernist Muslim.

One of the leading figures of Iranian Revolution of 1979, he was appointed prime minister in February 1979 by Ayatollah Khomeini, making him Iran's first prime minister after the revolution. He resigned his position in November of the same year, in protest at the takeover of the U.S. Embassy in Iran and as an acknowledgement of his government's failure in preventing it.

He was the head of the first engineering department of University of Tehran.

== Early life and education ==
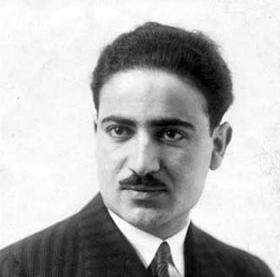
Bazargan in his youth

Bazargan was born into an Azerbaijani family in Tehran on 1 September 1907. His father, Hajj Abbasgholi Tabrizi (died 1954) was a self-made merchant and a religious activist in bazaar guilds.

Bazargan went to France to receive university education through an Iranian government scholarship during the reign of Reza Shah. He attended Lycée Georges Clemenceau in Nantes and was a classmate of Abdollah Riazi. Bazargan then studied thermodynamics and engineering at the École Centrale des Arts et Manufactures (École Centrale Paris).

Following his return to Iran, Bazargan was called up for conscription, and served from 1935 to 1937. According to Houchang Chehabi, Bazargan was first assigned menial tasks but then translated technical articles from French.

== Career ==
After his graduation, Bazargan became the head of the first engineering department at Tehran University in the late 1940s. He was a deputy minister under Premier Mohammad Mosaddegh in the 1950s. Bazargan served as the first Iranian head of the National Iranian Oil Company under the administration of Prime Minister Mosaddegh.

Bazargan co-founded the Liberation Movement of Iran in 1961, a party similar in its program to Mossadegh's National Front. Although he accepted the Shah, Mohammad Reza Pahlavi, as the legitimate head of state, he was jailed several times on political grounds. A strong admirer of Mahatma Gandhi, he praised Gandhi's ideas and the Indian independence movement in his writings in jail as an ideal example for Iranians.

=== Iranian Revolution ===
On 4 February 1979, Bazargan was appointed prime minister of Iran by Ayatollah Ruhollah Khomeini. He was seen as one of the democratic and liberal figureheads of the revolution who came into conflict with the more radical religious leaders – including Khomeini himself – as the revolution progressed. Although pious, Bazargan initially disputed the name Islamic Republic, wanting an Islamic Democratic Republic. He had also been a supporter of the original (non-theocratic) revolutionary draft constitution, and opposed the Assembly of Experts for Constitution and the constitution they wrote that was eventually adopted as Iran's constitution. Seeing his government's lack of power, in March 1979, he submitted his resignation to Khomeini but persuaded him to stay. In April 1979, he and his cabinet members were reported to have escaped an assassination attempt while attending the funeral of Mohammad-Vali Gharani.

Bazargan resigned, along with his cabinet, on 4 November 1979, following the taking of hostages at the U.S. Embassy. His resignation was considered a protest against the hostage-taking and a recognition of his government's inability to free the hostages, but it was also clear that his hopes for liberal democracy and an accommodation with the West would not prevail.

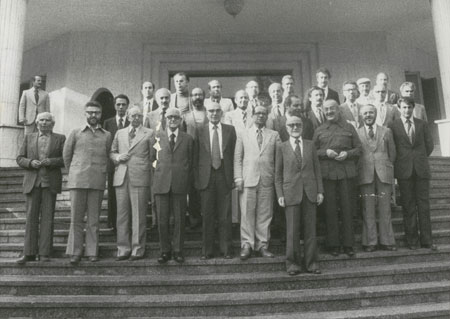
Bazargan's cabinet

Bazargan continued in Iranian politics as a member of the first Parliament (Majles) of the newly formed Islamic Republic. He openly opposed the Cultural Revolution and continued to advocate civil rule and democracy. In November 1982, he expressed his frustration with the direction the Islamic Revolution had taken in an open letter to the then speaker of parliament Akbar Hashemi Rafsanjani.

The government has created an atmosphere of terror, fear, revenge and national disintegration. ... What has the ruling elite done in nearly four years, besides bringing death and destruction, packing the prisons and the cemeteries in every city, creating long queues, shortages, high prices, unemployment, poverty, homeless people, repetitious slogans and a dark future?

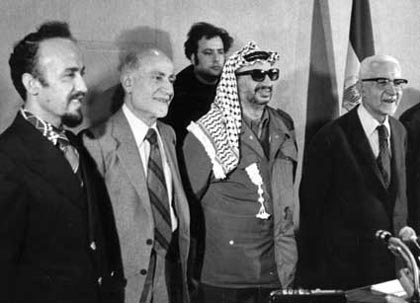
Bazargan with Hashem Sabbaghian, Yasser Arafat and Yadollah Sahabi

His term as a member of parliament lasted until 1984. During his term, he served as a lawmaker of the Freedom Movement of Iran, which he had founded in 1961, and which was abolished in 1990. In 1985, the Council of Guardians denied Bazargan's petition to run for president. But he remained a fearless critic, lashing out at the government for its hard line on the 1980-88 Iran-Iraq war and at human rights violations. In 1986, Bazargan and several aides suffered a fresh ordeal, kidnapped by radicals as a retaliation for their part in the formation of an Association for the Defense of Freedom and Sovereignty of the Iranian Nation. The association was a feeble protest and suffered yet another setback in 1990, when government agents arrested his son, Abdolali, and eight associates for their part in an open letter to President Hashemi Rafsanjani that called for democratic liberalization. They were not freed until 1992. More likely, he will be mourned by Iranians used to seeing his 'father figure' at religious gatherings associated with the democratic movement in Iran.

=== Views ===
Bazargan was a respected figure within the ranks of modern Muslim thinkers, known as a representative of liberal-democratic Islamic thought and a thinker who emphasized the necessity of constitutional and democratic policies. In the immediate aftermath of the revolution Bazargan led a faction that opposed the Revolutionary Council dominated by the Islamic Republican Party and personalities such as Ayatollah Mohammad Hosseini Beheshti. He opposed the continuation of the Iran–Iraq War and the involvement of Islamists in all aspects of politics, economy and society. Consequently, he faced harassment from militants and young revolutionaries within Iran.

=== Attacks ===
On 8 April 1978, Bazargan's house in Tehran was bombed. The underground committee for revenge, a reputed state-financed organization, claimed responsibility for the bombing.

=== Laws of social evolution ===
Bazargan is known for some of the earliest work in human thermodynamics, as found in his 1946 chapter "A Physiological Analysis of Human Thermodynamics" and his 1956 book Love and Worship: Human Thermodynamics, the latter of which being written while in prison, in which he attempted to show that religion and worship are a byproduct of evolution, as explained in English naturalist Charles Darwin's On the Origin of Species (1859), and that the true laws of society are based on the laws of thermodynamics.

== Death ==
Bazargan died of a heart attack on 20 January 1995 at a hospital in Zurich, Switzerland after collapsing at Zurich Airport. He was travelling to the United States for heart surgery.

== Personal life ==
Bazargan married Malak Tabatabai in 1939. They had five children, two sons and three daughters.

== See also ==
- Bazargan chronology
- Intellectual movements in Iran
- Iranian Committee for the Defense of Freedom and Human Rights
- Religious-Nationalists

Political offices
| Preceded by Shapour Bakhtiar | Prime Minister of Iran; 1979 | Succeeded by Mohammad Ali Rajai |
| Preceded by Karim Sanjabi | Foreign Affairs Minister of Iran; 1979 | Succeeded by Ebrahim Yazdi |
Party political offices
| Preceded by None | Secretary-General of Freedom Movement of Iran; 1961–1995 | Succeeded by Ebrahim Yazdi |
