= List of spouses of the president of Iran =

Spouse of the president of Iran
- Incumbent; Vacant since 19 May 2024
- Status: Unofficial

There is no official title for the spouse of the president of Iran. Fatemeh Majidi, the wife of the current president of Iran, Masoud Pezeshkian, was killed in an auto crash in 1994, and Pezeshkian has never remarried.

== List ==
No.	Name	Image	President	Start	End
1	Ozra Hosseini		Abolhassan Banisadr	4 February 1980	22 June 1981
2	Ateghe Sediqi		Mohammad-Ali Rajai	2 August 1981	30 August 1981
3	Mansoureh Khojasteh Bagherzadeh		Ali Khamenei	9 October 1981	16 August 1989
4	Effat Marashi		Akbar Hashemi Rafsanjani	16 August 1989	3 August 1997
5	Zohreh Sadeghi		Mohammad Khatami	3 August 1997	3 August 2005
6	Azam al-Sadat Farahi		Mahmoud Ahmadinejad	3 August 2005	3 August 2013
7	Sahebeh Arabi		Hassan Rouhani	3 August 2013	3 August 2021
8	Jamileh Alamolhoda		Ebrahim Raisi	3 August 2021	19 May 2024

== See also ==
- List of presidents of Iran
