= Ateghe Sediqi =

Iranian politician (born 1943)

- عاتقه صدیقی
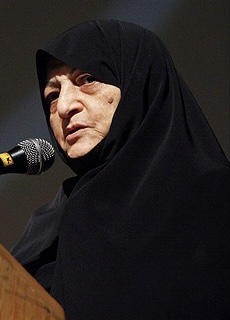
- Sediqi in 2009

Member of the Parliament of Iran
- In office 1 November 1981 – 3 May 1992
- Constituency: Tehran, Rey, Shemiranat and Eslamshahr
- Majority: 1,842,746

Spouse of the President of Iran
- In role 2 August 1981 – 30 August 1981
- President: Mohammad-Ali Rajai
- Preceded by: Ozra Hosseini
- Succeeded by: Mansoureh Khojasteh Bagherzadeh

Personal details
- Born: Pouran Rajai; 2 September 1943 (age 82) Qazvin, Iran
- Party: Islamic Republican Party; Islamic Association of Teachers
- Spouse: Mohammad-Ali Rajai (m. 1958; died 1981)
- Children: 3

Ateghe Sediqi (Persian: عاتقه صدیقی, born Pouran Rajai on 2 September 1943) is an Iranian politician and human rights activist who was the wife of former Iranian President Mohammad-Ali Rajai. She was also a member of Iranian Parliament from 1981 to 1992.

== Career ==
Pouran Rajai was born on 2 September 1943 in Qazvin, Iran. She changed her name to Ateghe Sediqi in 1975 because of her husband's activities during the Iranian Revolution.

She accompanied her husband in demonstrations against Pahlavi regime. She also helped Rajai in the establishment of the Refah School and managed the school after her husband entered politics. She was also one of the members of the welcoming staff when Ruhollah Khomeini returned to Iran from exile on 1 February 1979. After Rajai was assassinated in a bombing on 30 August 1981, Sediqi was nominated for the parliamentary seat of Tehran, Rey, Shemiranat and Eslamshahr district in a by-election held on 2 October 1981. She won the election with 1,842,746 votes. She was also re-elected in the 1984 and 1988 elections. However, her nomination for the 1992 election was rejected by the Guardian Council. At the time of the ninth presidential election in 2005, Mehdi Karroubi, in an open and grievance-filled letter addressed to Akbar Hashemi Rafsanjani, stated that the disqualification of Sediqi had occurred with the claim that she had insulted Rafsanjani and his family. She supported Mir-Hossein Mousavi in the 2009 presidential election.

Sediqi opposed former President Mahmoud Ahmadinejad and believed that Ahmadinejad has appropriated her husband's name, arguing "the presidency of Mahmoud Ahmadinejad was a punishment from God due to the ingratitude shown toward the eight years of the reformist government." At the time of the 2009 presidential election, her criticisms intensified to the point that, in a speech to educators in Isfahan, she openly protested not only against Mahmoud Ahmadinejad but also against his high-ranking supporters, saying: "They intend to gradually steer the country toward training forces with Taliban-like thinking, which is a very dangerous move." She issued a statement expressing support for Mir-Hossein Mousavi, warning against military interference in the elections, and declared: "Previously, I had expressed my concerns in the 2005 presidential election. Now, as we witness major violations of the law, the involvement of some military commanders in politics, treating the people as outsiders, the lack of transparency of information, and the securitization of many political, cultural, and economic spheres of the country, I am doubly reminded of this feeling of concern and danger." She also traveled to various cities during the same election, giving speeches in support of Mir-Hossein Mousavi. She implicitly criticized Ali Khamenei, the supreme leader of Iran, as well. In her campaign speeches in 2009, she said: "Running the country based on paternalism, self-centeredness, and medieval methods leads to the destruction of human dignity and respect." In the aftermath of the election and following the 2009 Iranian presidential election protests, she and her family distanced themselves from Iran's political scene and spoke less frequently on political matters.

Honorary titles
Preceded by Ozra Hosseini as wife of Abolhassan Banisadr	Spouse of the President of Iran; 1981	Succeeded by Mansoureh Khojasteh Bagherzadeh as wife of Ali Khamenei
