= Moezi =

Moezi or Mo'ezzi is a surname. Notable people with the surname include:

- Abdul Hussein Mo'ezzi, also spelled Abdolhossein Moezi, Iranian cleric
- Behzad Moezi, Imperial Iranian air force colonel
