= Abdol Javad Alamolhoda =

Iranian Ayatollah (1930–2020)

Ayatollah Seyed Abdol Javad Alamolhoda
- آیت الله سید عبدالجواد علم‌الهدی
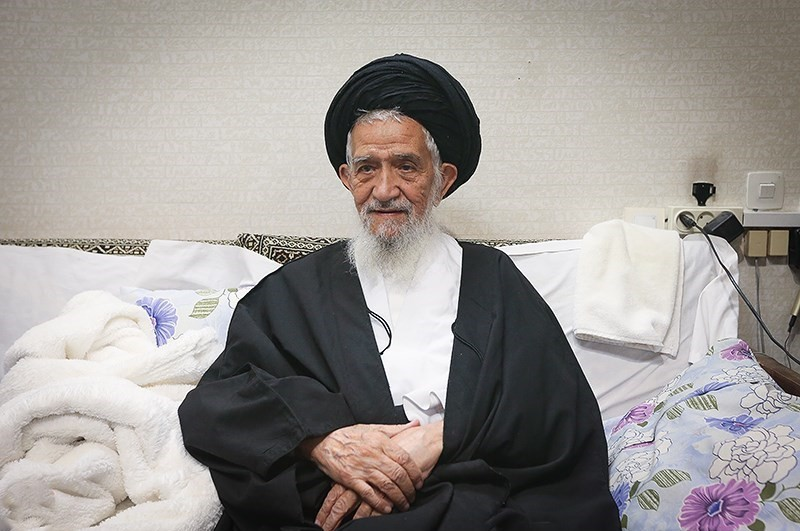
- Alamolhoda in 2017
- Title: Ayatollah

Personal life
- Born: 1930 Mashhad, Imperial State of Persia (present-day Iran)
- Died: 20 August 2020 (aged 89–90) Tehran, Iran
- Resting place: Imam Reza Shrine; 36.2880°N 59.6157°E
- Education: Qom Hawza
- Relatives: Ahmad Alamolhoda (younger brother); Jamileh Alamolhoda (niece)

Religious life
- Religion: Islam
- Founder of: Al-Qaim Seminary Tehran
- Jurisprudence: Twelver Shia Islam

Muslim leader
- Teacher: Hossein Borujerdi; Ruhollah Khomeini

Seyed Abdol Javad Alamolhoda (Persian: سید عبدالجواد علم‌الهدی: 1930 – 20 August 2020) was an Iranian ayatollah. He was the older brother of Ahmad Alamolhoda, the Friday prayer leader in Mashhad. He was also the founder of Al-Qaim Seminary in Tehran.

== Biography ==
Alamolhoda was born into a religious family in Mashhad, son of Seyed Ali Alamolhoda. While attending school he learnt the Quran along with his other studies. At the age of 14, in 1944, he went to Qom to attend the Qom Seminary to begin his Islamic studies. While in Qom he was taught by Ruhollah Khomeini, Hossein Borujerdi, Mohammad Hadi al-Milani, Shahab ud-Din Mar'ashi Najafi, and Morteza Haeri Yazdi After spending many years in Qom, he left to Tehran where he established the Al-Qaim Seminary in 1969. During the events leading to the 1979 Iranian revolution, he was in contact with Khomeini, as he wrote 10 letters to him. In the 70's, he went to France to visit Khomeini, where he delivered secret messages regarding people revolting against the Shah. He was also interrogated by SAVAK, and was banned from giving Khutbahs (lectures) on the Minbar (pulpit).

== Works ==
- International Zionism
- Hajj
- Scientific Knowledge of the Quran
- A Treatise on Islamic Beliefs in the Shiite Religion
- The Effectiveness of Asking for Forgiveness
- Lectures of Ayatollah Borujerdi
- Lectures on Jurisprudence of Ayatollah Khomeini
- The Fish of this World
- al-Jabr al-Ikhtiyar

== Death ==
Alamolhoda died on 20 August 2020 in Tehran. His funeral prayers took place in the Shahid Motahhari High School, the prayers were led by Mohammed Emami-Kashani. His body was then transferred to Mashhad, where he would be buried next to Imam Reza Shrine. Notable Iranian figures were present, including former President Ebrahim Raisi (1960–2024). Ali Khamenei also sent a message of condolences.

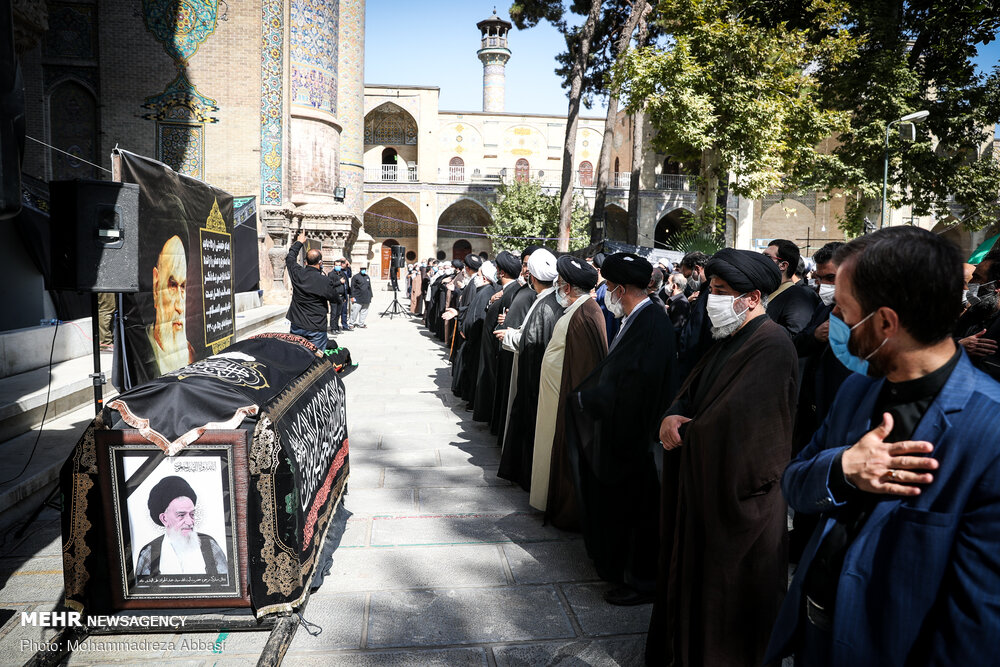
Funeral of Abdol Javad Alamulhuda in Tehran
