= Azam al-Sadat Farahi =

Iranian teacher (born c. 1958)

- اعظم‌السادات فراحی
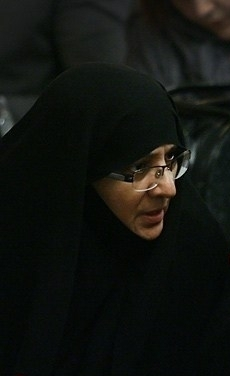
- Farahi in 2013

Spouse of the President of Iran
- In role 3 August 2005 – 3 August 2013
- President: Mahmoud Ahmadinejad
- Preceded by: Zohreh Sadeghi
- Succeeded by: Sahebeh Rouhani

Personal details
- Born: c. 1958 (age 67–68)
- Spouse: Mahmoud Ahmadinejad (m. 1980)
- Children: 3
- Education: Mechanical engineering
- Alma mater: Iran University of Science and Technology
- Occupation: Teacher

Azam al-Sadat Farahi (Persian: اعظم‌السادات فراحی) (born c. 1958) is an Iranian teacher who is the wife of former Iranian president Mahmoud Ahmadinejad.

== Biography ==
Azam al-Sadat Farahi was born in 1958 in Tehran, in the Resalat neighborhood, to a middle-class family. Her parents were originally from the city of Mashhad.

Farahi graduated from the Iran University of Science and Technology, where she completed a degree in mechanical engineering. She currently works as a chemistry and physics teacher.

She has appeared in public only rarely. In 2006, she accompanied her husband on an official visit to Kuala Lumpur.

In 2008, a letter she sent to Suzanne Mubarak, the wife of Hosni Mubarak, brought her name to public attention. In the letter, published in the Iranian press, she publicly called on Egypt’s First Lady to use her influence to secure aid for the residents of Gaza. In the letter, Farahi wrote that “watching the bodies of women and children is painful, and even worse is that some governments in Arab and Islamic countries do not support the oppressed people of Gaza.”

In 2009, she delivered a speech at the Forum of First Ladies at the headquarters of the United Nations Food and Agriculture Organization (FAO) in Rome. In her speech, she described Iran as an example in the fight against hunger, stating that her country’s system, based on religious principles, guarantees food security for all families. She also condemned the plight of hungry children in Gaza.

In 2010, she joined her husband on a widely publicized tour that included visits to Uganda, Azerbaijan, and Lebanon.

In public appearances, she is known for wearing a full black chador.

== Personal life ==
Farahi and Mahmoud Ahmadinejad were married on June 12, 1980. The couple have three children: two sons, Mehdi and Alireza, and a daughter, Fatemeh.

Honorary titles
Preceded by Zohreh Sadeghi as wife of Mohammad Khatami	Spouse of the President of Iran; 2005–2013	Succeeded by Sahebeh Arabi as wife of Hassan Rouhani
