= Jamileh Alamolhoda =

Iranian writer and scholar (born 1965)

- جمیله علم‌الهدی
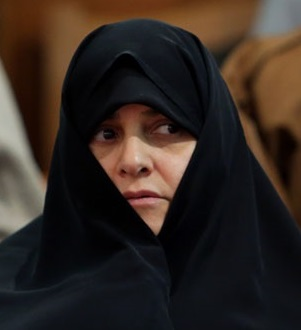
- Alamolhoda in 2019

Spouse of the President of Iran
- In role 3 August 2021 – 19 May 2024
- President: Ebrahim Raisi
- Preceded by: Sahebeh Rouhani
- Succeeded by: Vacant

Personal details
- Born: Jamileh-Sadat Alamolhoda c. 1965 (age 60–61) Mashhad, Imperial State of Iran
- Spouse: Ebrahim Raisi (m. 1983; died 2024)
- Children: 2
- Parent: Ahmad Alamolhoda (father)
- Relatives: Abdol Javad Alamolhoda (uncle)
- Occupation: Writer, scholar, lecturer

Jamileh-Sadat Alamolhoda (Persian: جمیله‌سادات علم‌الهدی; born 1965) is an Iranian writer and scholar. She is the widow of Ebrahim Raisi, the 8th president of Iran, to whom she was married from 1983 until his death in a helicopter crash in 2024. She served as the Spouse of the President of Iran from 2021 to 2024 during Raisi's time in office.

== Career and activities ==
Alamolhoda received her doctorate in the field of philosophy of education from Tarbiat Modares University in 2001. She became a member of the faculty of the Department of Leadership and Educational Development of the School of Educational Sciences and Psychology of Shahid Beheshti University and is now an associate professor. She teaches courses such as philosophy of higher education, anthropology in Islam, teaching methods, theoretical foundations of educational management, philosophical schools and educational views in the doctoral course of Shahid Beheshti University.

Alamolhoda was the director of the Humanities Research Institute. She founded the Institute of Fundamental Studies of Science and Technology of Shahid Beheshti University in 2013 and is its director. This research institute has the task of presenting science and technology policy models based on understanding and evaluating the epistemological and social aspects of science and technology. In March 2020, she was appointed as the secretary of the "Council for the Transformation and Renovation of the Educational System of the Country" by the Supreme Council of the Cultural Revolution.

Alamolhoda was appointed member of the executive board for faculty recruitment at Tehran University in May 2023.

== Personal life ==
Alamolhoda is the eldest daughter of Ahmad Alamolhoda, the Friday prayer leader in Mashhad and a member of the Assembly of Experts. In 1983, at the age of 18, she married Ebrahim Raisi. The couple had two daughters, one of whom has a PhD in sociology from the University of Tehran and the other a BSc in physics from Sharif University of Technology.

National University of Modern Languages in Islamabad, Pakistan, conferred an honorary doctorate on Jamileh Alamolhoda during her visit on 22 April 2024.

Honorary titles
Preceded by Sahebeh Arabi as wife of Hassan Rouhani	Spouse of the President of Iran; 2021–2024	Vacant
