= Adibi =

Adibi is a Persian surname. People with the surname include:

- Akbar Adibi (1939–2000), Iranian engineer
- Saleh Adibi (born 1963 or 1964) Iranian academic and diplomat
- Xavier Adibi (born 1984), American football player
