= Ozra Hosseini =

Widow of Abolhassan Banisadr

- عذرا حسینی

Spouse of the President of Iran
- In role 4 February 1980 – 21 June 1981
- President: Abolhassan Banisadr
- Preceded by: Position established
- Succeeded by: Ateghe Sediqi

Personal details
- Born: Hamadan, Imperial State of Persia
- Spouse: Abolhassan Banisadr (m. 1961; died 2021)
- Children: 3

Ozra Hosseini (Persian: عذرا حسینی) is the widow of Abolhassan Banisadr, who was the President of Iran from February 1980 until his impeachment by parliament in June 1981.

== Biography ==
Hosseini was born in Hamadan, Iran. In 1961, while she was about to graduate high school she married Abolhassan Banisadr, the son of her family's neighbor. They had two daughters and one son. She was not as politically active as her husband. In his memoirs, Ali Jannati recounted Mohammad Montazeri heavily criticizing her for appearing without hijab during a meeting between him, Akbar Hashemi Rafsanjani and her husband. Banisadr was recorded to have stated that he would not force his wife to adhere to a certain type of hijab. Rafsanjani later used the incident as an excuse to question Banisadr's suitability for presidency but his concerns were dismissed by the then-Supreme Leader Ruhollah Khomeini. Following Banisadr's impeachment, Hosseini was arrested by the Islamic Revolution Committees but was released after an intervention by Mohammad Beheshti. After a stop in Karachi, Pakistan, she and her son arrived in Paris in August 1981.

Beginning in 1981, Banisadr and Hosseini lived in Versailles, near Paris, in a villa closely guarded by French police. Their daughter, Firouzé, married Massoud Rajavi in Paris following their exile. They later divorced, and the alliance between Banisadr and Rajavi also ended.

Hosseini was widowed after Banisadr's death in October 2021 following a long illness.

Honorary titles
New title	Spouse of the President of Iran; 1980–1981	Succeeded by Ateghe Sediqi as wife of Mohammad-Ali Rajai
