= Ahmad Alamolhoda =

Iranian politician and cleric (born 1944)

Ayatollah; Seyyed; Ahmad Alamolhoda
- احمد علم‌الهدی
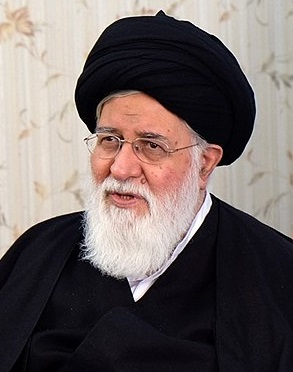
- Alamolhoda in 2018

Member of the Assembly of Experts
- Incumbent
- Assumed office 19 February 2007
- Constituency: Razavi Khorasan Province
- Majority: 1,235,565 (44.43%)

Personal details
- Born: 1 September 1944 (age 82) Mashhad, Imperial State of Iran
- Party: Combatant Clergy Association
- Spouse: Sakineh Rikhtegarzadeh (died 2017)
- Children: 7, including Jamileh
- Relatives: Ebrahim Raisi (son-in-law); Abdol Javad Alamolhoda (older brother)

Seyyed Ahmad Alamolhoda (Note: Persian: احمد علم‌الهدی) (born 1 September 1944) is an Iranian politician and Shia cleric. He has been described as "senior" and "ultra conservative" and "hardline." His rank has been given both as Hojjatoleslam and Ayatollah. He is the Friday Prayer leader in Mashhad, Iran, and is that city's representative in the Iranian Assembly of Experts. Alamulhuda is a member of Combatant Clergy Association.

== Early life ==
Ahmad Alamolhoda was born in Mashhad, Iran, to a Persian Shia Muslim Seyyed family descended from the Prophet Muhammad.

== Political views ==
=== Domestic views ===
Alamolhoda's name appeared in international media as a speaker at a 30 December 2009 rally held in favor of the Islamic regime, where he was quoted as calling opponents of the Supreme Leader Ali Khamenei in comments broadcast on Iranian state TV, Alamolhoda told demonstrators,

"Enemies of the leader, according to the Quran, belong to the party of Satan ... Our war in the world is war against the opponents of the rule of the supreme leader."

Alamolhoda was a strong critic of Akbar Hashemi Rafsanjani, the previous head of the Assembly of Experts, whom Alamolhoda attacked for "his silence in the face of unprecedented insults against the leader of the revolution" (Ali Khamenei), and warned him to "reform his behavior before it was too late."

=== Women's rights ===
Alamolhoda is known for his restrictive measures against women's rights in Iran. He has in his Friday Prayers speeches spoken against women's right to ride bicycles in Mashhad. He opposes women entering football stadiums in Mashhad. He stands against the holding of concerts in Mashhad, believing that people who travel to the "holy city of Mashhad" should only come for prayers.

=== Israel ===
Alamolhoda said in 2013 that "The destruction of Israel is the idea of the Islamic Revolution in Iran and is one of the pillars of the Iranian Islamic regime." He declared: "We cannot claim that we have no intention of going to war with Israel."

In October 2023, Alamolhoda declared that "the Holy Essence proclaims that divine signs are manifest in the land of Palestine" and warned that "any atheist movement with intentions of trespassing and committing crimes in this land shall be annihilated." He asserted that "Hezbollah has 100,000 precision missiles" and that Iran's regional allies, including Hezbollah and Shi'ite militias in Iraq, are "engaged in the conflict" and ready to support Hamas. Alamolhoda concluded by stating that these groups are "fighting against Israel and destroying that cancerous cell".

=== United States ===
In a Friday sermon delivered on 2 November 2024, Alamolhoda asserted that Iran had successfully "exported the anti-Americanism movement," claiming that resistance to the United States had "evolved into global phenomena, even resonating within America itself." Speaking on the anniversary of the 1979 Iran hostage crisis, he celebrated the 444-day seizure of American diplomats as a turning point in global opposition to U.S. influence. Acknowledging early criticism of the act, even from within revolutionary circles, he said, "At the time, many circles viewed this move as a profound error... Yet today, we are acknowledged as a formidable regional power." He praised Iran's role in developing a "vast network of resistance across Islamic societies."

== Notes ==
Political offices
Preceded by Abbas Vaez Tabasi	Representative of the Supreme Leader in Razavi Khorasan Province; 2016–present	Succeeded by Incumbent
Religious titles
Preceded by Mahdi Ebadi	Friday prayers Imam of Mashhad; 2005–present	Succeeded by Incumbent
