= Rouhani (surname) =

Rouhani روحانی
- Pronunciation: Persian: [roʊhɒːˈniː]

Origin
- Meaning: Spiritual; cleric

Rouhani (Persian: روحانی, means "spiritual" and "cleric"), also transliterated as Rowhani and Rohani, is a surname. Notable people with the surname include:

- Freddy Rouhani (b. 1963 or 1964), Iranian-American professional poker player
- Fuad Rouhani, former Secretary-General of OPEC
- Gholamreza Rouhani, Iranian poet
- Hassan Rouhani, 7th President of Iran from 2013 to 2021
- Hossein Rouhani, Iranian karateka
- Mansour Rouhani, Pahlavi era politician in Iran
- Sayyid Sadeq Rohani, Iranian Twelver Shia Marja'
- Shahrdad Rouhani, Iranian composer, violinist/pianist, and conductor
- Taghi Rouhani, Iranian radio personality
