= Zohreh Sadeghi =

Iranian charity founder (born 1950)

- زهره صادقی

Spouse of the President of Iran
- In role 3 August 1997 – 3 August 2005
- President: Mohammad Khatami
- Preceded by: Effat Marashi
- Succeeded by: Azam al-Sadat Farahi

Personal details
- Born: c. 1950 (age 75–76) Qom, Imperial State of Iran
- Spouse: Mohammad Khatami (m. 1974)
- Children: 3
- Relatives: Musa al-Sadr (uncle); Sadeq Tabatabaei (cousin)

Zohreh Sadeghi (Persian: زهره صادقی; born 1950) is the wife of former Iranian President Mohammad Khatami and a niece of the Lebanese leader of the Amal Movement Musa al-Sadr.

== Career ==
In 1999, together with wives of other government officials, Sadeghi founded the Behafarin Farda charity entity and serves as its president.

Her most important political presence was in 2008 and during the Gaza War. Ten days before Azam al-Sadat Farahi wrote a letter to the First Lady of Egypt Suzanne Mubarak, Sadeghi got in contact with Moza bint Nasser to call on governments and nations to support the Palestinian people.

She has been vocal about her support of women's rights in Iran, citing discrimination against women as a serious obstacle to achieving hidden potentials.

== Personal life ==
Sadeghi's mother was the sister of Musa al-Sadr. Her father Ali Akbar Sadeghi was a lecturer at Shahid Beheshti University for 38 years and died in 2014. Sadeq Tabatabaei and Fatemeh Tabatabaei (wife of Ahmad Khomeini) were Zohreh Sadeghi's maternal first cousins.

Sadeghi married Mohammad Khatami in 1974. The couple have two daughters and one son: Laila (born 1975), Narges (born 1980), and Emad (born 1988). All their children are reported to be living outside Iran.

Honorary titles
Preceded by Effat Marashi as wife of Akbar Hashemi Rafsanjani	Spouse of the President of Iran; 1997–2005	Succeeded by Azam al-Sadat Farahi as wife of Mahmoud Ahmadinejad
