= Salaheddin Bayani =

Iranian politician

Member of the Parliament of Iran
- In office 28 May 1980 – 28 May 1984
- Constituency: Khaf and Roshtkhar
- Majority: 37,508 (60.50%)

Personal details
- Born: 1938 (age 87–88) Khaf, Iran
- Party: Office for the Cooperation of the People with the President

Salaheddin Bayani (Persian: صلاح‌الدین بیانی) was an Iranian politician who served as a member of Parliament of Iran from 1980 to 1984.

== Early life and education ==
Bayani was born in 1938 in the city of Khaf, Khorasan to Habibollah, a farmer. He obtained a bachelor's degree in law and became a civil servant.

== Political career ==
Bayani was elected in the 1980 Iranian legislative election. Sympathetic towards President Abolhassan Banisadr, he was the only member of the parliament who spoke in his favor during the impeachment process. He argued that he will vote against the motion, because "the party in power (Islamic Republican Party) did not want Banisadr from the start, but the people did, which is why they gave him 11 million votes and keep supporting him now".
