= Sahebeh Rouhani =

Iranian charity organizer (born 1954)

- صاحبه روحانی
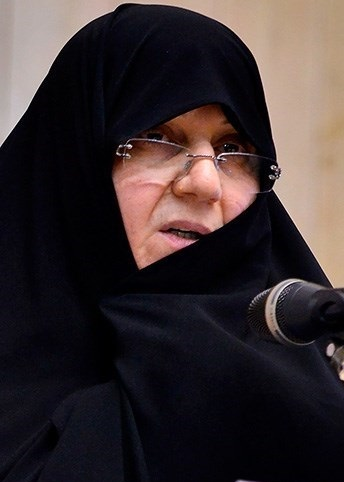
- Rouhani in 2013

Spouse of the President of Iran
- In role 3 August 2013 – 3 August 2021
- President: Hassan Rouhani
- Preceded by: Azam al-Sadat Farahi
- Succeeded by: Jamileh Alamolhoda

Personal details
- Born: Sahebeh Arabi; 1954 (age 71–72) Sorkheh, Semnan Province, Iran
- Spouse: Hassan Rouhani (m. 1968)
- Children: 5
- Known for: Spouse of the President of Iran

Sahebeh Rouhani (Persian: صاحبه روحانی, née Arabi; born 1954) is an Iranian charity organizer who is the wife of former Iranian President Hassan Rouhani.

== Family ==
Rouhani is the daughter of Abdolazim Arabi and Sareh-Khaton Peyvandi, aunt of Hassan Rouhani. She married Hassan Rouhani in 1968 when she was 14 years old. They have 5 children, the eldest of whom died in 1992. She does not participate in politics and spends her time engaged in charitable affairs. In July 2014, she started the construction of ten kindergartens.

== See also ==
- Cousin marriage in the Middle East

Honorary titles
Preceded by Azam al-Sadat Farahi as wife of Mahmoud Ahmadinejad	Spouse of the President of Iran; 2013–2021	Succeeded by Jamileh Alamolhoda as wife of Ebrahim Raisi
