= Behzad Moezi =

Imperial Iranian Air Force colonel (1938–2021)

- Born: 6 February 1938; Tehran, Iran
- Died: 10 January 2021 (aged 82); Paris, France
- Military career
- Rank: Colonel

Behzad Moezi was an Imperial Iranian Air Force colonel. He trained in the U.S., served in Mohammad Reza Pahlavi's air force for 23 years, and flew 1,200 hours during Iran's Gulf war against Iraq. Moezi is considered "one of the most celebrated pre-revolution Iranian pilots".

== Life and career ==
Moezi was born in Tehran on 6 February 1938. His father, Lt. Gen. Mahmoud Moezzi, was a high-ranking officer. Moezzi was also a descendant of the royal Qajar dynasty.

Moezi was responsible for flying Mohammad Reza Pahlavi and his family to Morocco during the Iranian revolution, and then flew the plane back to Iran. About this incident, Moezi said "The mullahs [Muslim clergymen] never forgive me", and "Nobody thanked me for getting rid of the Shah, nobody remembered that I brought back a $45 million airplane to the Iranian people." According to Moezzi, he "had hated flying for the Shah".

Moezi was a People's Mujahedin Organization of Iran member that had been undetected in the Iranian air force. He flew ex Iranian President Abolhassan Banisadr and Massoud Rajavi to France ahead of three Iranian jets sent to intercept them.

Moezi had been imprisoned after the Nozheh coup and then released at the outbreak of the war. He died from leukemia on 10 January 2021, in Paris, aged 82.
