= Saleh Adibi =

Iranian academic and diplomat

Ambassador to Vietnam and Cambodia
- Incumbent
- Assumed office 16 September 2015
- President: Hassan Rouhani
- Minister: Mohammad Javad Zarif

Personal details
- Born: 1963 or 1964 (age 62) Sanandaj, Kurdistan, Iran
- Education: University of Tehran

Saleh Adibi (Persian: صالح ادیبی) is an Iranian academic and diplomat currently serving as Iran's ambassador to Vietnam and accredited non-resident ambassador to Cambodia.

Adibi is the first ethnic Kurdish and the first Sunni ambassador in Iran.
