= Baghcheh, Hamadan =

Baghcheh باغچه
- Village
- Location within Iran
- Coordinates: 34°53′34″N 48°41′49″E
- Country: Iran
- Province: Hamadan
- County: Hamadan
- Bakhsh: Central
- Rural District: Sangestan

Population (2006)
  - Total: 297
- Time zone: UTC+3:30 (IRST)
  - Summer (DST): UTC+4:30 (IRDT)

Baghcheh (Persian: باغچه, also Romanized as Bāghcheh; also known as Bāghīcheh) is a village in Sangestan Rural District, in the Central District of Hamadan County, Hamadan Province, Iran. At the 2006 census, its population was 297, in 64 families.
