= Abolhassan Banisadr =

President of Iran from 1980 to 1981

Seyyed Abolhassan Banisadr
- ابوالحسن بنی‌صدر
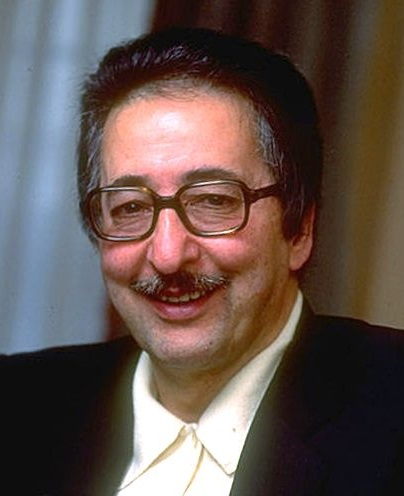
- Banisadr in 1980

President of Iran
- In office 4 February 1980 – 22 June 1981
- Supreme Leader: Ruhollah Khomeini
- Prime Minister: Mohammad-Ali Rajai
- Preceded by: Office established
- Succeeded by: Mohammad-Ali Rajai (Note: Between Abolhassan Banisadr’s impeachment on 22 June and Mohammad-Ali Rajai’s election on 24 July and his swearing into office on 2 August, the Interim Presidential Council was tasked with handing the duties of the president.)

Head of Council of the Islamic Revolution
- In office 7 February 1980 – 20 July 1980
- Preceded by: Mohammad Beheshti
- Succeeded by: Office abolished

Minister of Foreign Affairs Acting
- In office 12 November 1979 – 29 November 1979
- Appointed by: Council of the Revolution
- Preceded by: Ebrahim Yazdi
- Succeeded by: Sadegh Ghotbzadeh

Minister of Economic Affairs and Finance
- In office 17 November 1979 – 10 February 1980
- Appointed by: Council of the Revolution
- Preceded by: Ali Ardalan
- Succeeded by: Hossein Namazi

Member of the Assembly of Experts for Constitution
- In office 15 August 1979 – 15 November 1979
- Constituency: Tehran Province
- Majority: 1,752,816 (69.4%)

Personal details
- Born: 22 March 1933 Hamadan, Pahlavi Iran
- Died: 9 October 2021 (aged 88) Paris, France
- Party: Independent
- Other political affiliations: National Front (1960s); Office for the Cooperation of the People with the President (1979–1981); National Council of Resistance of Iran (1981–1983)
- Spouse: Ozra Hosseini (m. 1961)
- Children: 3
- Education: University of Tehran; University of Paris

Abolhassan Banisadr (Note: Persian: ابوالحسن بنی‌صدر) (22 March 1933 – 9 October 2021) was an Iranian politician, writer, and political dissident who served as the first president of Iran following the Iranian Revolution, holding office from 1980 until his impeachment in 1981. Prior to his presidency, he was minister of foreign affairs in the Interim Government of Iran.

Following his impeachment, Banisadr fled Iran and was granted political asylum in France, where he cofounded the National Council of Resistance of Iran with Mojahedin-e-Khalq leader Massoud Rajavi. He later focused on political writings about his revolutionary activities and his critiques of the Iranian government. He became a critic of Supreme Leader Ali Khamenei and of the country's handling of the 2009 elections.

== Early life and education ==
Banisadr was born on 22 March 1933 in Baghcheh, a village north of Hamadan. His father, Nasrollah, was a Shia cleric who was originally from Bijar, Kurdistan.

Banisadr studied law, theology, and sociology at the University of Tehran. As a member of the National Front, he participated in the anti-Shah student movement during the early 1960s, resulting in his imprisonment on two occasions and his wounding during the 1963 demonstrations.

== Career ==
=== Initial exile ===
Due to his political activities, Banisadr fled Iran for France, where he studied finance and economics at the University of Paris. While there, he also wrote a book on Islamic finance, Eghtesad Tohidi, which roughly translates as "The Economics of Monotheism", and led the Islamic Association of Students, a religious faction affiliated with the National Front.

In 1972, Banisadr's father died. At the funeral in Iraq, Banisadr met Ruhollah Khomeini and subsequently became his advisor. Both later returned to Iran on 1 February 1979, as the Iranian Revolution neared its conclusion.

=== Return to Iran ===
Upon the establishment of a post-revolutionary Interim Government, Banisadr was named Deputy Minister of Finance. At Khomeini's direction, he also became a member of the Council of the Islamic Revolution, taking the seat vacated by Mehdi Bazargan, who had left to become the prime minister. On 12 November 1979, following the dissolution of the Interim Government in response to the Iran hostage crisis. Banisadr replaced Ebrahim Yazdi as Minister of Foreign Affairs. That same month, on 17 November, Banisadr was promoted to Minister of Finance. He openly criticized the hostage crisis, arguing that the ordeal was isolating Iran from the Third World and forming "a state within a state."

=== Presidency ===
In January 1980, Banisadr registered to become a candidate for Iran's newly formed presidency. Though he lacked religious credentials, he remained protected by Khomeini, who had insisted that members of the clergy not run for office. On 25 January 1980, the election was held and Banisadr received 75.6 percent of the vote, winning a four-year term as president. Inaugural ceremonies took place on 4 February at a hospital where Khomeini was recuperating from a heart ailment.

While in office, Banisadr led Iran's response to the outbreak of the Iran-Iraq war in September 1980, during which he survived two helicopter crashes near the border. Additionally, he oversaw the release of the American embassy hostages on 20 January 1981.

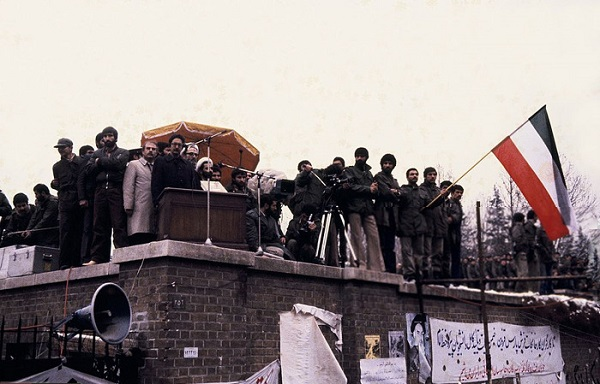
Banisadr speaking at a rally, 1980

==== Impeachment ====
By May 1981, Iran was experiencing difficulties on the front line, a decline in human rights, stricter media censorship, increased corruption, and heavy social upheaval. Banisadr, long engaged in a power struggle with religious hardliners, called for a new referendum, noting that while he had won over 10 million votes in the presidential election, the theocratic Islamic Republican Party (IRP) received less than 4 million in the subsequent parliamentary elections. This message of defiance became a rallying point for many doubters and dissidents of the new regime, including the militant left-wing Mojahedin-e Khalq (MEK) organization.

Amid calls for Banisadr's impeachment over his remarks, Khomeini told him he could retain the presidency if he publicly apologized, but Banisadr refused, instead asking for "resistance" from the public. As a result, on 10 June 1981, Khomeini stripped Banisadr of his title as commander-in-chief. The Islamic Consultative Assembly debated Banisadr's ouster; only one legislator, Salaheddin Bayani, spoke in his favor during the proceedings. Legislators filed articles of impeachment against Banisadr on 21 June, which Khomeini endorsed and signed off on the next day. Hussein-Ali Montazeri, then second in line to the supreme leader, remained supportive of Banisadr.

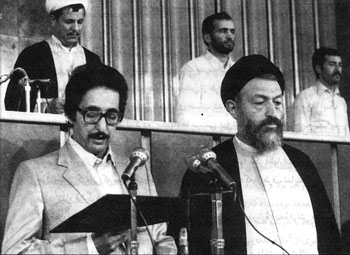
Banisadr (left) being inaugurated as the first President of Iran in 1980. Akbar Hashemi Rafsanjani is directly behind him, while Mohammad Beheshti is to the right.

In the days before his removal from office, Banisadr had gone into hiding in Tehran as the Islamic Revolutionary Guard Corps (IRGC) seized presidential buildings and imprisoned writers at newspapers aligned with him. In an attempt to regain power, Banisadr sought to organize a coalition of anti-Khomeini factions, including the MEK, the Democratic Party of Iranian Kurdistan, and the communist Organization of People's Fedaian Guerrillas, while eschewing any contact with pro-monarchist exile groups. Street violence soon escalated as both Hezbollah and the IRGC attacked "counterrevolutionary" demonstrators at a large pro-Banisadr rally, killing 50, wounding 300, and arresting nearly a thousand.

Throughout June and July of 1981, several of Banisadr's closest friends and advisors were executed, in addition to hundreds of other revolutionaries deemed unsympathetic to the Islamic regime. The 27 July 1981 execution of prominent MEK member Mohammad Reza Saadati led Banisadr and MEK leader Massoud Rajavi to conclude that it was unsafe to remain in Iran.

== Flight and second exile ==
On 29 July 1981, Banisadr and Rajavi were smuggled aboard an Iranian Air Force Boeing 707 piloted by sympathetic Army Colonel Behzad Moezi. The path was a routine flight plan, deviating from Iranian groundspace to Turkish airspace and eventually landing in Paris. A news service report from Tehran noted that government spokesman Behzad Nabavi told state radio that Banisadr attempted to disguise himself as a woman by wearing a skirt and shaving his eyebrows and mustache.

Banisadr and Rajavi found political asylum in France, conditional on abstaining from anti-Khomeini activities inside the country, a restriction effectively ignored by the two after the French embassy evacuated from Tehran. Banisadr, Rajavi, and the Democratic Party of Iranian Kurdistan established the National Council of Resistance of Iran in Paris in October 1981. By 1984, however, Banisadr had withdrawn from the coalition after a disagreement with Rajavi.

=== My Turn to Speak ===
In 1991, Banisadr released an English translation of his 1989 text My Turn to Speak: Iran, the Revolution and Secret Deals with the U.S. In the book, Banisadr alleged covert dealings between the Ronald Reagan presidential campaign and leaders in Tehran to prolong the Iran hostage crisis before the 1980 United States presidential election. He also claimed that Henry Kissinger plotted to set up a Palestinian state in the Iranian province of Khuzestan and that Zbigniew Brzezinski conspired with Saddam Hussein to plot Iraq's 1980 invasion of Iran.

Lloyd Grove of The Washington Post described the book as atypical for a bestseller, noting that it was assembled from interviews by French journalist Jean-Charles Deniau and characterized it as often enigmatic and complex rather than straightforward. In a review for Foreign Affairs, William B. Quandt characterized the book as a rambling and self-serving collection of reminiscences, stating that it contains numerous sensational allegations but lacks supporting documentation. Kirkus Reviews called it "an interesting—though frequently incredible and consistently self-serving-memoir," adding that "frequent sensational accusations render [Banisadr's] tale an eccentric, implausible commentary on the tragic folly of the Iranian Revolution."

=== Later activities ===
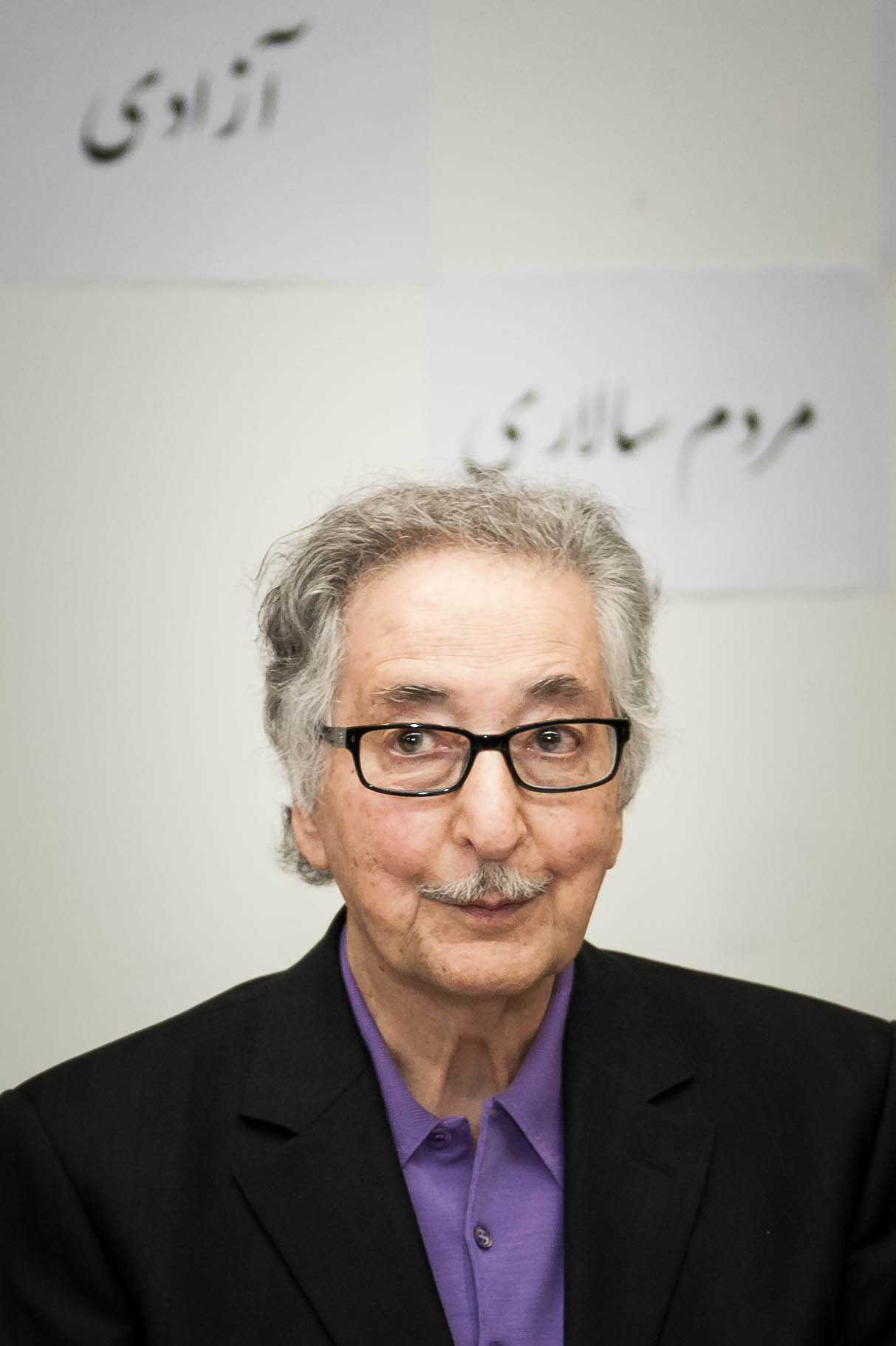
Banisadr in Hamburg, 2013

In a 2008 interview with the Voice of America, Banisadr claimed that Khomeini was both directly responsible for the violence originating from the Muslim world and for breaking the promises he had made while in exile. In July 2009, Banisadr publicly denounced the Iranian government's conduct after the disputed presidential election, alleging that "Ali Khamenei ordered the fraud in the presidential elections and the ensuing crackdown on protesters." In addition, Banisadr stated that the regime was "holding on to power solely by means of violence and terror", accusing its leaders of amassing individual wealth to the detriment of Iranian citizens.

In published articles on the 2009 Iranian presidential election protests, Banisadr attributed the unusually open political climate before the election to the government's urgent need to prove its legitimacy, which he said had been lost. He further wrote that the spontaneous uprising had not only cost the government its political legitimacy, but that Ali Khamenei's threats leading to the violent crackdown had also cost the government its religious legitimacy.

== Personal life and death ==
In 1961, Banisadr married Ozra Hosseini. They had one son and two daughters.

Beginning in 1981, Banisadr lived with his family in the commune of Auvers-sur-Oise, under close guard by French police, until later moving to Versailles. Banisadr's daughter, Firouzé, married Massoud Rajavi in 1982, but the couple divorced in 1984 following Banisadr's withdrawal from the NCRI.

After a long illness, Banisadr died at Pitié-Salpêtrière Hospital in Paris on 9 October 2021, at the age of 88. He is buried in Versailles, in the cemetery of Gonards.

Hossein Mousavian, Secretary of Iran's National Front, described Banisadr as "a man of principles." Iran analyst Morteza Kazemian stated on Iran International that Banisadr was "an independent nationalist figure, who believed in Iran's territorial integrity and strived to strengthen social movements in Iran and fight clerical despotism."

== Books ==
- Touhid Economics, 1980
- My Turn to Speak: Iran, the Revolution and Secret Deals with the U.S. Washington, D.C.: Potomac Books, 1991. ISBN 0-08-040563-0. Translation of Le complot des ayatollahs. Paris: La Découverte, 1989
- Le Coran et le pouvoir: principes fondamentaux du Coran, Imago, 1993
- Dignity in the 21st Century, Doris Schroeder and Abol-Hassan Banisadr, with translation by Mahmood Delkhasteh and Sarah Amsler
- Books after 1980

== Notes ==
Political offices
Preceded by Ali Ardalan	Minister of Finance of Iran; 1979	Succeeded by Hossein Namazi
Preceded by Ebrahim Yazdi	Minister of Foreign Affairs of Iran (Acting); 1979	Succeeded by Sadegh Ghotbzadeh
Preceded by Mohammad Beheshti	President of the Council of Islamic Revolution; 1980	Succeeded by Position abolished
New title Position established	President of Iran; 1980–1981	Succeeded by Mohammad-Ali Rajai
Military offices
Vacant Title last held by Mohammad Reza Pahlavi	Commander-in-Chief of the Iranian Armed Forces; 1980–1981	Succeeded by Ruhollah Khomeini
