= Shahid Motahhari High School =

- دبیرستان شهید مطهری

Location
- North of Palestine square, Tehran; Tehran; Iran
- Coordinates: 35°42′32″N 51°24′12″E

Information
- Type: Public school
- Religious affiliation: Shia Islam
- Grades: 10, 11, 12
- Enrollment: 900
- Website: www.motahhari.sch.ir

Shaheed Motahhari High School (Persian: دبیرستان شهید مطهری) is a college preparatory high school located in Tehran, Iran. It is named after the Ayatollah Morteza Motahhari Iranian scholar, cleric, University lecturer, and politician.

== History ==
The school was founded as a University-preparatory school and had only one grade. after 2010 this school became a high school.
