= Hassan Rouhani =

President of Iran from 2013 to 2021

Hujjat al-Islam Hassan Rouhani
- حسن روحانی
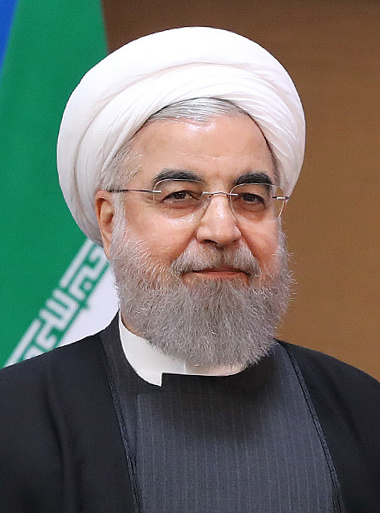
- Rouhani in 2017

President of Iran
- In office 3 August 2013 – 3 August 2021
- Supreme Leader: Ali Khamenei
- Vice President: Eshaq Jahangiri
- Preceded by: Mahmoud Ahmadinejad
- Succeeded by: Ebrahim Raisi

Secretary General of the Non-Aligned Movement
- In office 3 August 2013 – 17 September 2016
- Preceded by: Mahmoud Ahmadinejad
- Succeeded by: Nicolás Maduro

Chief Nuclear Negotiator of Iran
- In office 6 October 2003 – 15 August 2005
- President: Mohammad Khatami
- Deputy: Hossein Mousavian
- Preceded by: Position established
- Succeeded by: Ali Larijani

1st Secretary of the Supreme National Security Council
- In office 14 October 1989 – 15 August 2005
- President: Akbar Hashemi Rafsanjani; Mohammad Khatami
- Preceded by: Position established
- Succeeded by: Ali Larijani

Member of the Assembly of Experts
- In office 19 February 2007 – 20 May 2024
- Constituency: Tehran Province
- In office 18 February 2000 – 19 February 2007
- Constituency: Semnan Province

First Deputy Speaker of the Parliament
- In office 2 June 1992 – 26 May 2000
- Preceded by: Hossein Hashemian
- Succeeded by: Behzad Nabavi

Member of the Islamic Consultative Assembly
- In office 28 May 1984 – 27 May 2000
- Constituency: Tehran, Rey, Shemiranat, Eslamshahr and Pardis
- In office 28 May 1980 – 27 May 1984
- Constituency: Semnan

Advisor to the President of Iran President of Center for Strategic Research
- In office 5 August 1992 – 10 June 1997
- President: Akbar Hashemi Rafsanjani
- Preceded by: Mohammad Mousavi Khoeiniha
- Succeeded by: Position abolished

Member of Expediency Discernment Council
- In office 8 May 1991 – 3 August 2013
- Appointed by: Ali Khamenei
- Chairman: Akbar Hashemi Rafsanjani
- Succeeded by: Mahmoud Ahmadinejad

National Security Advisor to the President of Iran
- In office 2000–2005
- President: Mohammad Khatami
- Preceded by: Khosrow Tehrani
- In office 1989–1997
- President: Akbar Hashemi Rafsanjani

Personal details
- Born: Hassan Fereydoun; 12 November 1948 (age 77) Sorkheh, Pahlavi Iran
- Party: Moderation and Development Party (1999–present)
- Other political affiliations: Combatant Clergy Association (1988–present; inactive since 2009); Islamic Republican Party (1979–87)
- Spouse: Sahebeh Arabi (m. 1968)
- Children: 5
- Education: Qom Seminary; University of Tehran; Glasgow Caledonian University
- Website: Personal website (Persian)

Military service
- Allegiance: Pahlavi Iran; Iran
- Branch/service: Imperial Iranian Ground Forces; Islamic Republic of Iran Armed Forces
- Years of service: 1971–72 (conscription); 1985–91
- Rank: Second lieutenant (1971–72)
- Unit: Science Corps of Nishapur (1971–72)
- Commands: Commander-in-Chief of Air Defense (1985–91); Deputy to Second-in-Command of Iran's Joint Chiefs of Staff (1988–89)
- Battles/wars: Iran–Iraq War
- Awards: Order of Nasr (1st Class) Order of Fath (2nd Class)

Hassan Rouhani (Note: Persian: حسن روحانی; (Note: Standard Persian pronunciation: [hæˈsæn-e ɾowhɒːˈniː])) (born Hassan Fereydoun, (Note: Persian: حسن فریدون) 12 November 1948) is an Iranian politician who served as the president of Iran from 2013 to 2021. He is also a sharia lawyer ("Wakil"), academic, former diplomat and Islamic cleric. He served as a member of Iran's Assembly of Experts from 1999 to 2024. He was a member of the Expediency Council from 1991 to 2013, and was a member of the Supreme National Security Council from 1989 to 2021. Rouhani was deputy speaker of the fourth and fifth terms of the Parliament of Iran (Majlis) and Secretary of the Supreme National Security Council from 1989 to 2005. In the latter capacity, he was the country's top negotiator with the EU three, the UK, France, and Germany, on nuclear technology in Iran, and has also served as a Shia mujtahid (a senior cleric), and economic trade negotiator.

On 7 May 2013, Rouhani registered for the presidential election that was held on 14 June 2013. He campaigned on promises to restore the economy, improve rocky relations with Western nations, and prepare a "civil rights charter" if elected. He also expressed official support for upholding the rights of ethnic and religious minorities. He was elected as President of Iran on 15 June, defeating Tehran mayor Mohammad Bagher Ghalibaf and four other candidates; he took office on 3 August 2013. In 2013, Time magazine named him in its list of the 100 Most Influential People in the World.

Rouhani is frequently described as a centrist and reformist. In domestic policy, he encourages personal freedom, free access to information, and has improved women's rights by appointing female foreign ministry spokespeople. He has also improved Iran's diplomatic relations with other countries by exchanging conciliatory letters. Rouhani won re-election in the 2017 election with 23,636,652 votes (57.1%). He became the third Iranian President, after Mohammad Khatami and Mahmoud Ahmadinejad, to win a presidential victory as an incumbent with an increased electoral mandate.

Although Rouhani originally had the support of Iranian Supreme Leader Ali Khamenei during his second term, their relationship soured as Khamenei criticized Rouhani for presumably being too soft in negotiations with the West over the Iran nuclear agreement. After his second term, Rouhani was not appointed to any senior role by Khamenei. According to The New York Times, Rouhani was one of the potential and likely candidates in the 2026 supreme leader election following Khamenei's assassination. However, Khamenei's son, Mojtaba Khamenei was elected his father's successor.

== Early life and education ==
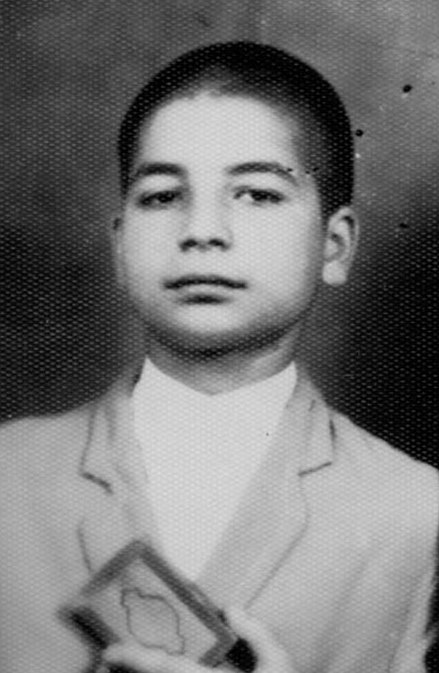
Rouhani as a teenager

Hassan Rouhani was born Hassan Fereydoun on 12 November 1948 in Sorkheh, near Semnan, in a religious Persian family. His father, Haj Asadollah Fereydoun (died 2011), had a spice shop in Sorkheh and his mother lived in Semnan until her death in 2015 with her daughters and sons-in-law. Asadollah Fereydoun is reported to have been politically active against Mohammad Reza Shah Pahlavi, the Shah of Iran, and arrested first in 1962, and then more than 20 times before the Iranian Revolution in 1979.

Rouhani started religious studies in 1960. First at Semnan Seminary before moving on to the Qom Seminary in 1961. He attended classes taught by prominent scholars of that time including Mostafa Mohaghegh Damad, Morteza Haeri Yazdi, Mohammad-Reza Golpaygani, Soltani, Mohammad Fazel Lankarani, and Mohammad Shahabadi. In addition, he studied modern courses, and was admitted to the University of Tehran in 1969, and obtained a BA degree in Judicial Law in 1972. In 1973, Rouhani entered military service in the city of Nishapur.

Rouhani continued his studies at Glasgow Caledonian University in Scotland, and graduated in 1995 with an MPhil degree in Law with his thesis entitled The Islamic legislative power with reference to the Iranian experience and a PhD degree in Constitutional Law in 1999 for a thesis titled The Flexibility of Shariah (Islamic Law) with reference to the Iranian experience. Rouhani's Caledonian research was initially supervised by Iranian lawyer and scholar Sayed Hassan Amin and later by Islamic law scholar Mahdi Zahraa.

The website of the Center for Strategic Research, a think-tank headed by Rouhani, misattributed his doctorate to Glasgow University rather than Glasgow Caledonian University and confusion ensued as a result on whether he was a graduate of either university, especially as he was known during his student years by his birth name "Hassan Fereydoun". Glasgow Caledonian University carried out an internal investigation to confirm Rouhani's alumnus status and after confirming it, it published Rouhani's theses abstracts and a video showing him being capped, as Scottish academic tradition provides, during the university's 1999 graduation ceremony.

=== Allegations of PhD thesis plagiarism ===
Allegations regarding Rouhani's plagiarism were first raised in 2013 when it was claimed that he had probably "lifted" sentences from a book by Afghan author Mohammad Hashim Kamali. Glasgow Caledonian University, Rouhani's graduation school, argued that the sentences were both cited properly. The issue was raised again amid 2017 Iranian presidential election when a student campaign claimed that they had for the first time investigated Rouhani's whole thesis using plagiarism detection tool iThenticate and that chapters one through four of Rouhani's thesis had been plagiarized at least 39%, 43%, 40% and 82%, respectively. Ayatollah Ali Akbar Kalantari, a member of the Assembly of Experts, Shiraz University faculty member and one of the alleged victims, said that "major segments" of Chapter 4 of Rouhani's thesis had been translated from his book without being referenced.

Reformist Sadegh Zibakalam accused Rouhani's rival of politicizing the case right before the elections. Mohammad Mehdi Zahedi, head of Iranian Parliament's Commission on Education and Research, said that he had found major plagiarisms in chapter 4 of Rouhani's thesis and that the case would be investigated in Education and Research Commission. 50 student-run organizations as well as Shiraz University faculty professors asked Ali Akbar Kalantari to prosecute the case in separate letters.

== Personal life ==
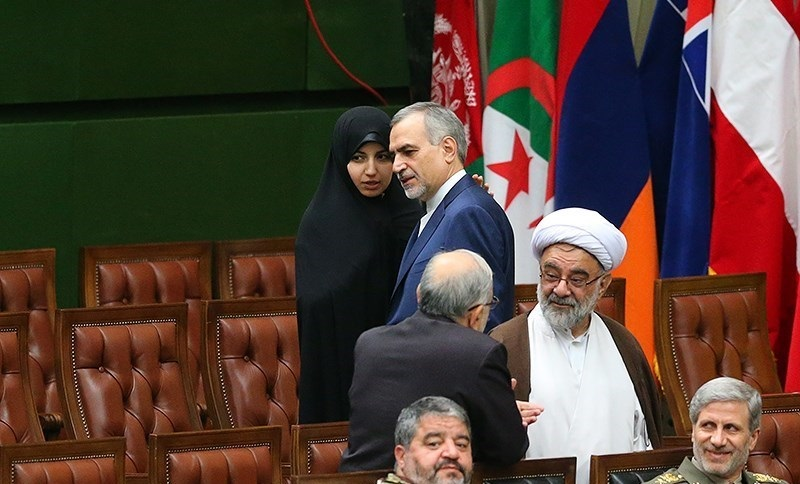
Rouhani's daughter speaking with Rouhani's brother Hossein Fereydoun

Rouhani married his cousin, Sahebeh Erabi, who was 14 years old, when he was around 20 years old and has four children (one son and three daughters). Rouhani's wife changed her last name from "Еrabi" (Persian: عربی) to "Rouhani" some time after marriage. Born in 1954, she is not politically active. The Guardian and the Financial Times reported that Rouhani also had a fifth child, a son who died in unknown circumstances. Based on a comment by journalist Alireza Nourizadeh, some sources reported that he committed suicide "in protest of his father's close connection with Supreme Leader Ali Khamenei". This claim, apparently originating from Nourizadeh's report in the Saudi-owned newspaper Asharq Al-Awsat, included the following text which allegedly came from the son's suicide note: "I hate your government, your lies, your corruption, your religion, your double standard and your hypocrisy...I was forced to lie to my friends each day, telling them that my father isn't part of all of this. Telling them my father loves this nation, whereas I believe this to be untrue. It makes me sick seeing you, my father, kiss the hand of Khamenei."

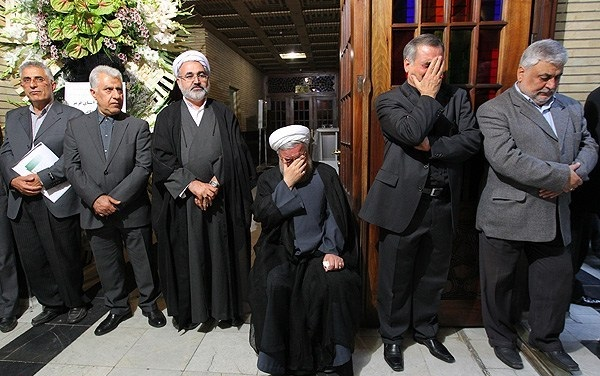
Rouhani surrounded by his family at his father's funeral, Noor mosque, Tehran on 5 October 2011

Rouhani has three sisters and a brother. Rouhani's brother, Hossein Fereydoun, is also a diplomat and politician, a former governor, ambassador, and former Vice Minister of Intelligence. He was Rouhani's representative to IRIB in arrangements for presidential debates. Akbar Hashemi Rafsanjani, in a memoir dated 15 May 1982, mentions Hossein Fereydoun as the then governor of Karaj. Rafsanjani later briefly mentions Fereydoon in a memoir dated 31 March 1984: "In Karaj, something has happened about Mr. Ferydoon Rouhani."

=== Name ===
He was born Hassan Fereydoun (or Fereydun, in reference to a just king in Persian mythology, Persian: ‌حسن فریدون, Persian pronunciation: [hæˌsæn-e feɾejˈdun]) and later changed his last name to Rouhani, which means 'spiritual' or 'cleric'; also transliterated as Rowhani, Ruhani, or Rohani). It is not clear when he officially changed his last name. He was named as "Hassan Fereydoun Rouhani" (Persian: حسن فریدون روحانی) in a list of Majlis representatives on 5 July 1981, while photos of his identification card (in Persian transliteration: shenasnameh) taken around his presidential campaign in 2013 only say "Rouhani" is his last name.

== Political activities before the Iranian Revolution ==
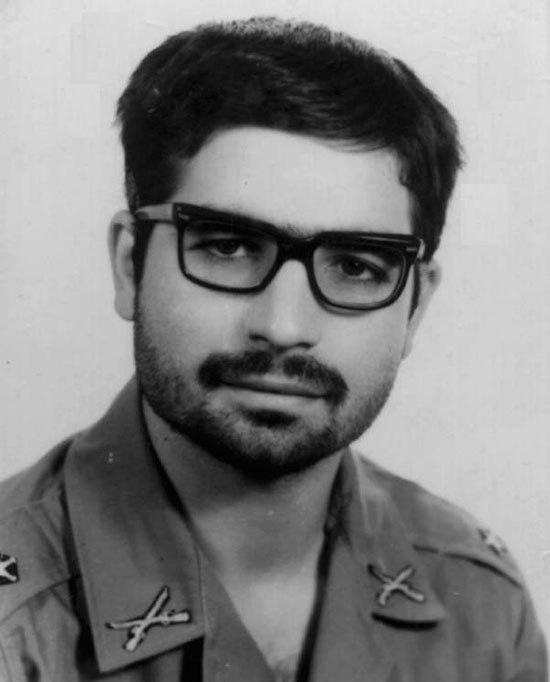
Rouhani during his military service

As a young cleric, Rouhani started his political activities by following the Ayatollah Ruhollah Khomeini during the beginning of the Iranian Islamist movement. In 1965, he began traveling throughout Iran making speeches against the government of the Mohammad Reza Pahlavi, the Shah (king) of Iran. During those years he was arrested many times and was banned from delivering public speeches.

In November 1977, during a public ceremony held at Tehran's Ark Mosque to commemorate the death of Mostafa Khomeini (the elder son of the Ayatollah Khomeini), Rouhani used the title "Imam" for the Ayatollah Khomeini, the then exiled leader of the Islamist movement, for the first time. It has been suggested that the title has been used for Khomeini by others before, including by the Grand Ayatollah Mohammad Baqir al-Sadr, although Rouhani was influential in publicizing the title.

Since he was under surveillance by SAVAK (Iran's pre-revolution intelligence agency), the Ayatollah Mohammad Beheshti and the Ayatollah Morteza Motahhari advised him to leave the country.

Outside Iran he made public speeches to Iranian students studying abroad and joined Khomeini upon arriving in France.

== Political career during the 1980s and 1990s ==
=== Early years of the Islamic Republic ===
Following the 1979 Iranian Revolution, Rouhani, who had been engaged in revolutionary struggles for about two decades, did his best to stabilize the nascent Islamic Republic and as a first step, he started with organizing the disorderly Iranian army and military bases. He was elected to the Majlis, the Parliament of Iran, in 1980. During five terms in the Majlis and for a total of 20 years (from 1980 to 2000), he served in various capacities including deputy speaker of the Majlis (in 4th and 5th terms), as well as the head of defense committee (1st and 2nd terms), and foreign policy committee (4th and 5th terms).

Among responsibilities shouldered by him in the post-revolution era was leadership of the supervisory council of the Islamic Republic of Iran Broadcasting (IRIB) from 1980 to 1983. In July 1983, while Rouhani was heading the council, the council members and Rouhani had conflicts with Mohammad Hashemi Rafsanjani the then head of IRIB, which led to the temporary replacement of Hashemi by first Rouhani and then immediately Mohammad Javad Larijani. The conflict was resolved by the Ayatollah Khomeini intervening and insisting on Rafsanjani staying as the head of IRIB.

=== Iran–Iraq War ===
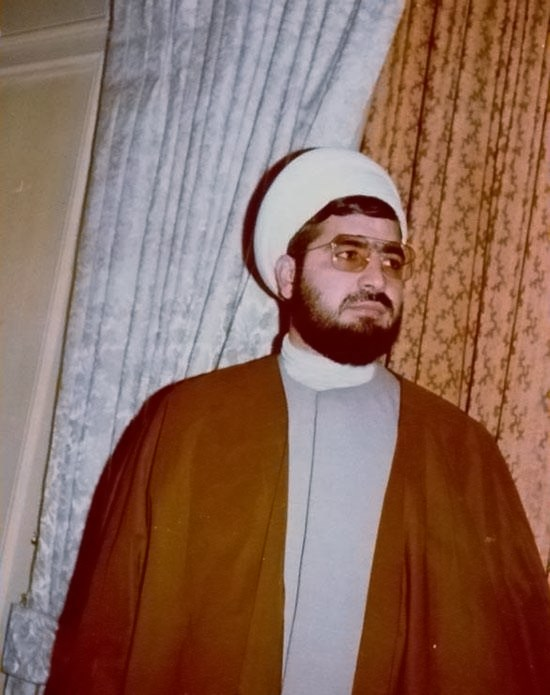
Rouhani after being elected as a member of the parliament

During the Iran–Iraq War, Rouhani was a member of the Supreme Defense Council (1982–1988), member of the High Council for Supporting War and headed its executive committee (1986–1988), deputy commander of the war (1983–1985), commander of the Khatam-ol-Anbiya Operation Center (1985–1988), and commander of the Iran Air Defense Force (1986–1991). He was appointed as Deputy to Second-in-Command of Iran's Joint Chiefs of Staff (1988–1989).

When Robert C. McFarlane, Reagan's national security adviser, came to Tehran in May 1986, Rouhani was one of the three people who talked to McFarlane about buying weapons. Eventually, this weapons sale became known as the Iran–Contra affair.

At the end of the war, Rouhani was awarded the second-grade Fath (Victory) Medal along with a group of commanders of the Iranian Army and the Revolutionary Guards. In another ceremony on the occasion of the liberation of Khoramshahr, he and a group of other officials and military commanders who were involved in the war with Iraq were awarded first-grade Nasr Medal by the Commander-in-Chief of the Armed Forces Ayatollah Khamenei.

=== After the war ===
Rouhani was offered and turned down the post of Minister of Intelligence of Iran in 1989.

After the Constitution of the Islamic Republic of Iran was amended and the Supreme National Security Council (SNSC) came into being up to the present time, he has been representative of the Supreme Leader, Ayatollah Khamenei, at the council. Rouhani was the first secretary of the SNSC and kept the post for 16 years from 1989 to 2005. He was also national security advisor – to President Hashemi and President Khatami – for 13 years from 1989 to 1997 and from 2000 to 2005. In 1991, Rouhani was appointed to the Expediency Council and has kept that post up to the present time. He heads the Political, Defense, and Security Committee of the Expediency Council.

After the Iran student protests, July 1999 he, as secretary of Supreme National Security Council, stated in a pro-government rally that "At dusk yesterday we received a decisive revolutionary order to crush mercilessly and monumentally any move of these opportunist elements wherever it may occur. From today our people shall witness how in the arena our law enforcement force... shall deal with these opportunists and riotous elements, if they simply dare to show their faces." and led the crackdown.

In the midterm elections for the third term of the Assembly of Experts which was held on 18 February 2000, Rouhani was elected to the Assembly of Experts from Semnan Province. He was elected as Tehran Province's representative to the Assembly's fourth term in 2006 and is still serving in that capacity. He was the head of the political and social committee of the assembly of experts (from 2001 to 2006), member of the presiding board, and head of Tehran office of the secretariat of the assembly (from 2006 to 2008). On 5 March 2013, he was elected as a member of the Assembly's "Commission for investigating ways of protecting and guarding Velayat-e Faqih".

In addition to executive posts, Rouhani kept up his academic activities. From 1995 to 1999, he was a member of the board of trustees of Tehran Universities and North Region. Rouhani has been running the Center for Strategic Research since 1991. He is the managing editor of three academic and research quarterlies in Persian and English, which include Rahbord (Strategy), Foreign Relations, and the Iranian Review of Foreign Affairs.

== Nuclear dossier ==
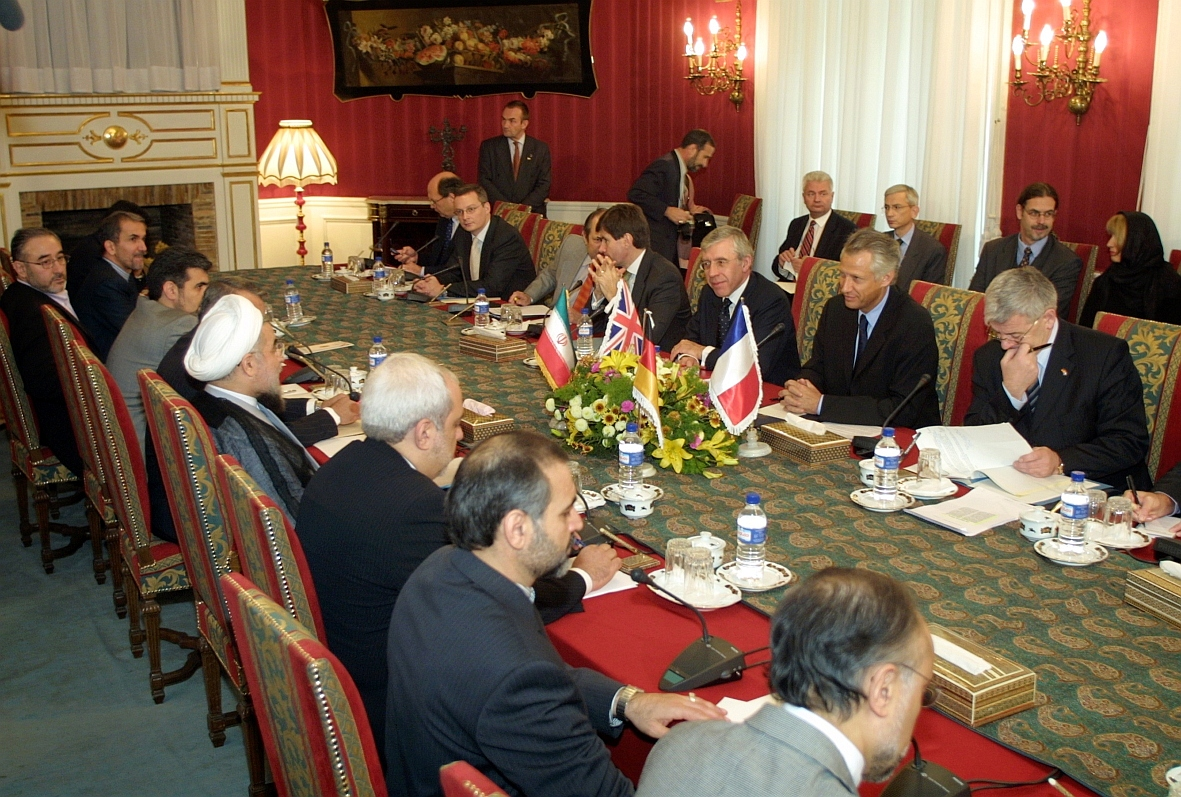
Iran-EU three's first meeting, Tehran, Iran, 21 October 2003

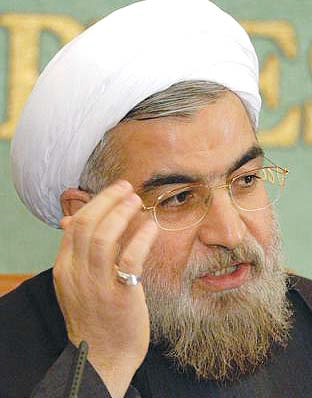
Rouhani, 29 January 2005

Rouhani was secretary of the Supreme National Security Council (SNSC) for 16 years. His leading role in the nuclear negotiations which brought him the nickname of "Diplomat Sheikh", first given to him by the nascent Sharq newspaper in November 2003 and was frequently repeated after that by domestic and foreign Persian-speaking media. His career at the council began under President Hashemi Rafsanjani and continued under his successor, President Khatami. Heinonen, former senior IAEA official, said that Rouhani used to boast of how he had used talks with Western powers to "buy time to advance Iran's programme." His term as Iran's top nuclear negotiator, however, was limited to 678 days (from 6 October 2003 to 15 August 2005). That period began with international revelations about Iran's nuclear energy program and adoption of a strongly worded resolution by the International Atomic Energy Agency (IAEA). In June 2004, the board of governors of the IAEA issued a statement which was followed by a resolution in September of the same year, which focused on Iran's nuclear case with the goal of imposing difficult commitments on Iran. That development was concurrent with the victory of the United States in Iraq war and escalation of war rhetoric in the region. The international community was experiencing unprecedented tensions as a result of which Iran's nuclear advances were considered with high sensitivity.

As tensions increased and in view of the existing differences between Iran's Ministry of Foreign Affairs and Atomic Energy Organization, a proposal was put forth by the foreign minister, Kamal Kharazi, which was accepted by the president and other Iranian leaders. According to that proposal, a decision was made to establish a politically, legally, and technically efficient nuclear team with Rouhani in charge. The team was delegated with special powers in order to formulate a comprehensive plan for Iran's interactions with the IAEA and coordination among various concerned organizations inside the country. Therefore, on the order of President Khatami with the confirmation of Ali Khamenei, Rouhani took charge of Iran's nuclear case on 6 October 2003. Subsequently, negotiations between Iran and three European states started at Sa'dabad Palace in Tehran and continued in later months in Brussels, Geneva and Paris.

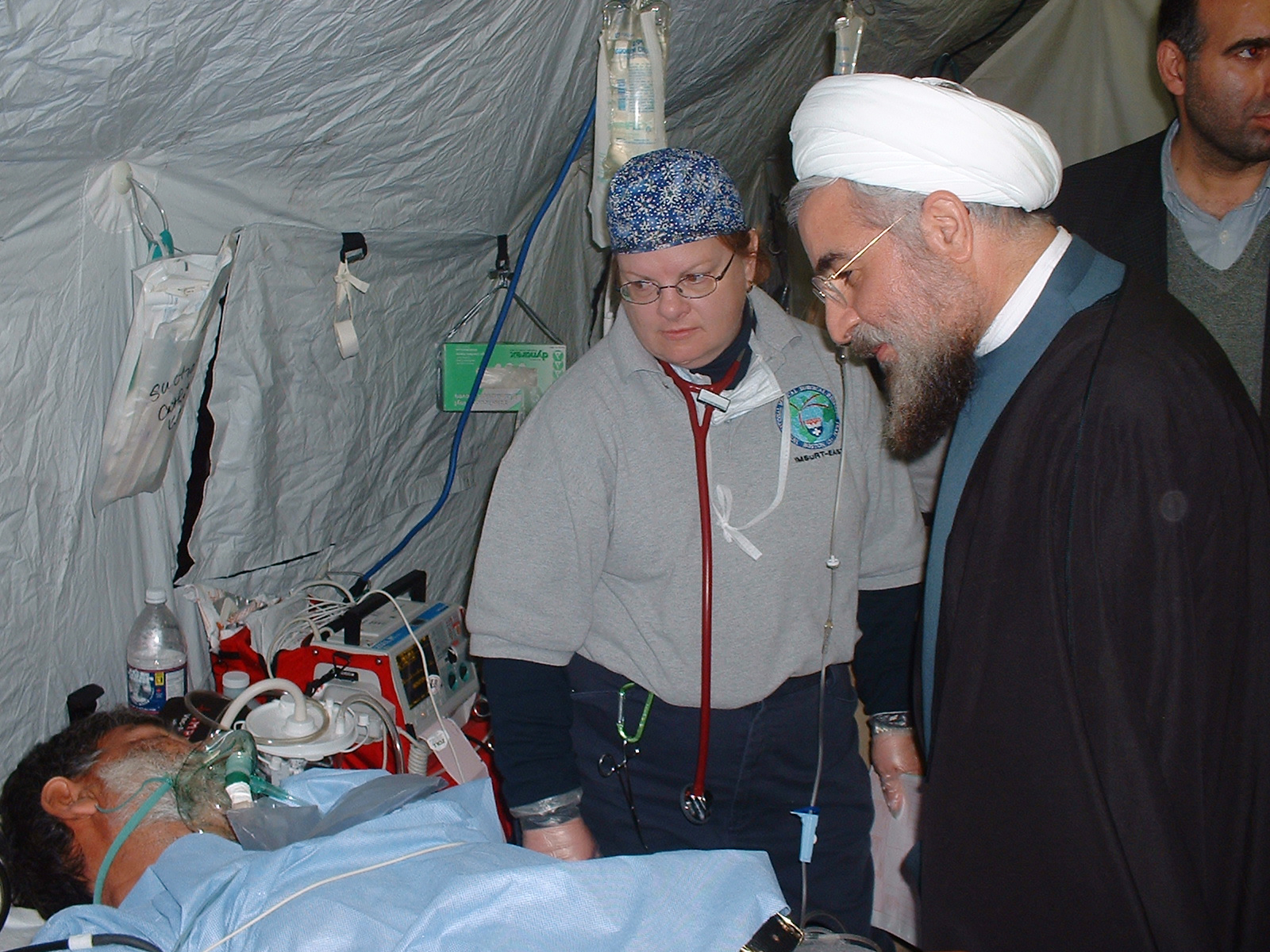
Rouhani visiting Federal Emergency Management Agency (FEMA) field hospital after the 2003 Bam earthquake

Rouhani and his team, whose members had been introduced by Ali Akbar Velayati and Kharazi as the best diplomats in the Iranian Foreign Ministry, based their efforts on dialogue and confidence building due to political and security conditions. As a first step, they prevented further escalation of accusations against Iran in order to prevent reporting Iran's nuclear case to the United Nations Security Council. Therefore, and for the purpose of confidence building, certain parts of Iran's nuclear activities were voluntarily suspended at several junctures.

In addition to building confidence, insisting on Iran's rights, reducing international pressures and the possibility of war, and preventing Iran's case from being reported to the UN Security Council, Iran succeeded in completing its nuclear fuel cycle and took groundbreaking steps. However, decisions made by the nuclear team under the leadership of Rouhani were criticized by certain circles in later years.

Following the election of Mahmoud Ahmadinejad as president, Rouhani resigned his post as secretary of the Supreme National Security Council after 16 years on 15 August 2005, and was succeeded by Ali Larijani as the new secretary who also took charge of Iran's nuclear case. Larijani, likewise, could not get along with the policies of the new government and resigned his post on 20 October 2007, to be replaced by Saeed Jalili. Rouhani then was appointed by the Supreme Leader as his representative at the SNSC.

== Presidential campaigns ==
=== 2013 presidential election ===
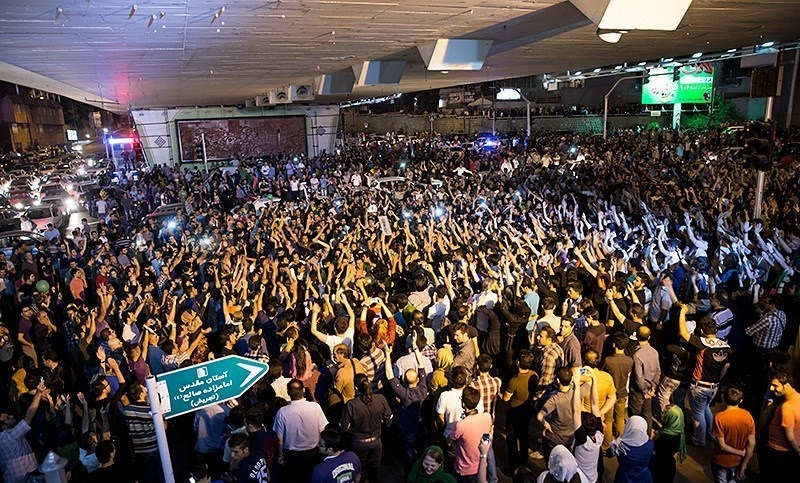
Rouhani's supporters celebrate his presidential victory in Tehran

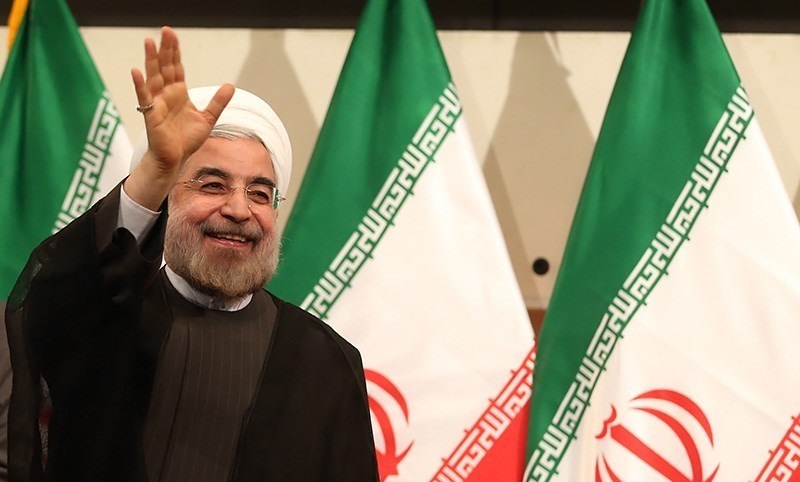
Rouhani during his victory speech, 15 June 2013

Our centrifuges are good to spin when our people's economy is also spinning in the right direction.

— Rouhani during TV debate

Rouhani was considered a leading candidate in the June election because of his centrist views yet close ties to Iran's ruling clerics and the Green Movement. He announced his presidential candidacy on 11 March 2013 and registered as a presidential candidate on 7 May. Amid the run-up to the election, former presidents Mohammad Khatami and Akbar Hashemi Rafsanjani, together with reformists supported Rouhani on the presidential race after pro-reform candidate Mohammad Reza Aref dropped out of the presidential race after Khatami advised him to quit in favor of Rouhani. On 10 June, Mehr news agency and Fars news agency, suggested that Rouhani might be disqualified prior to the election and The Washington Post, in an editorial, predicted that Rouhani "will not be allowed to win". On 15 June 2013, Interior Minister Mostafa Mohammad Najjar announced the results of the election, with a total number of 36,704,156 ballots cast; Rouhani won 18,613,329 votes, while his main rival Mohammad Bagher Ghalibaf secured 6,077,292 votes. Rouhani performed well with both the middle class and youth, even garnering majority support in religious cities such as Mashhad and Qom (an important seat of Shia Islam and the clergy, many of whom surprisingly do not support conservatives) as well as small towns and villages. Rouhani's electoral landslide victory was widely seen as the result of the Green Movement from the 2009 elections, with crowds chanting pro-reform slogans. Religious Iranians equally celebrated Rouhani's victory, demonstrating what analysts described as a thorough rejection of the policies of the conservative factions.

=== 2017 presidential election ===
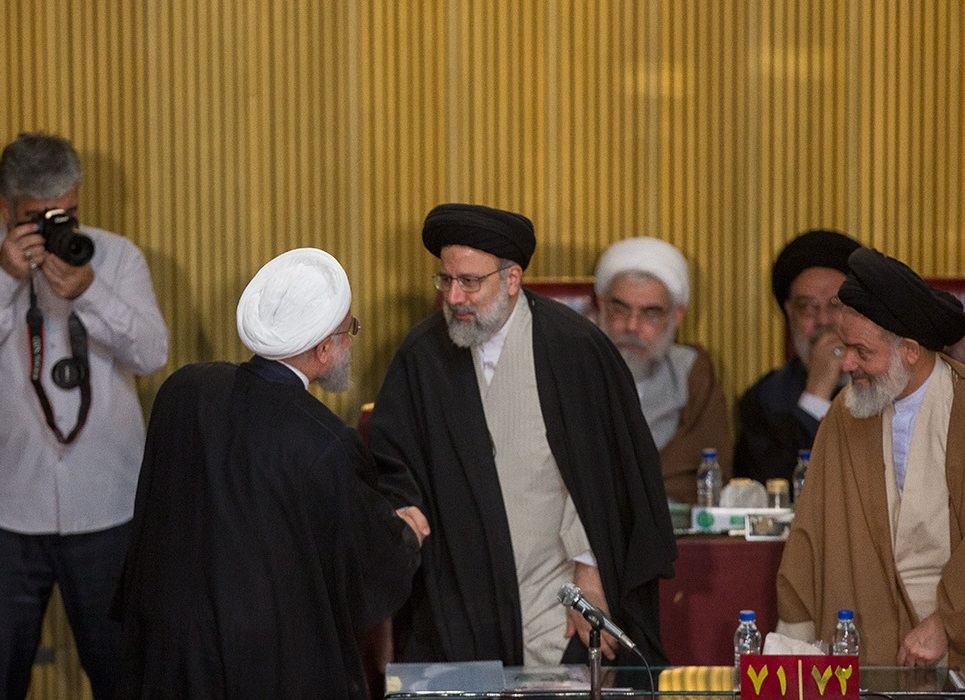
Rouhani shaking hands with Ebrahim Raisi at the Assembly of Experts

Rouhani saw off a strong challenge from hardline Ebrahim Raisi at the 2017 election, a fellow cleric with radically different politics, who stirred up populist concerns about the sluggish economy, lambasted Rouhani for seeking foreign investment and appealed to religious conservatives. He had gathered momentum as conservatives keen to win back control of the government coalesced behind Raisi's initially lacklustre campaign. His other rivals were Mostafa Mir-Salim and Mostafa Hashemitaba.

Rouhani ultimately won the election in a landslide, providing a ringing endorsement of his efforts to re-engage with the West and offer greater freedoms. He received 23,636,652 of the votes, in an election that had 73.07% turnout.

== Presidency (2013–2021) ==
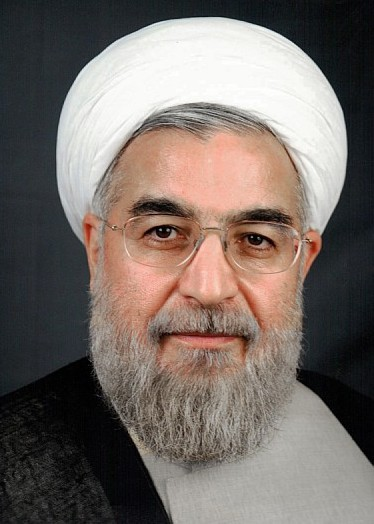
- Presidency of Hassan Rouhani; August 3, 2013 – August 3, 2021
- Cabinet: see first and second
- Party: Reformist (Moderation and Development)
- Election: 2013; 2017
- Seat: Pasteur St. Building
- Seal of the presidential administration

In his press conference one day after election day, Rouhani reiterated his promise to recalibrate Iran's relations with the world. He promised greater openness and to repair the country's international standing, offering greater nuclear transparency in order to restore international trust. Revolutionary Guards Major General Mohammad Jafari criticised Rouhani's administration. "The military, systems and procedures governing the administrative system of the country are the same as before, [but it] has been slightly modified and unfortunately infected by Western doctrine, and a fundamental change must occur. The main threat to the revolution is in the political arena and the Guards cannot remain silent in the face of that." In May 2017, Rouhani was re-elected as president with 23.5 million votes.

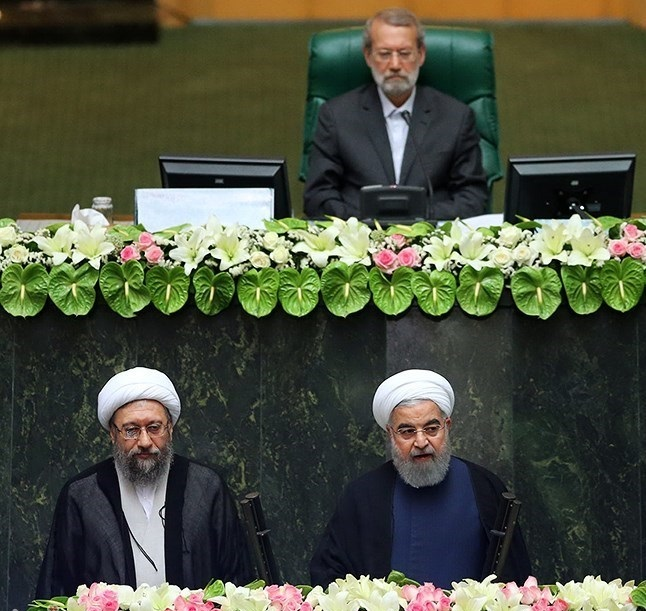
Rouhani taking oath of office in the Iranian Parliament with Chief Justice Sadeq Larijani at his right

He was announced the winner on the day following the election. He received his presidential precept from his predecessor, Mahmoud Ahmadinejad on 3 August 2013 and entered Sa'dabad Palace in a private ceremony. His work as president officially began on the same day at 17:00 IRDT. He was inaugurated as the seventh president of Iran on 4 August in House of the Parliament.

=== Cabinet ===
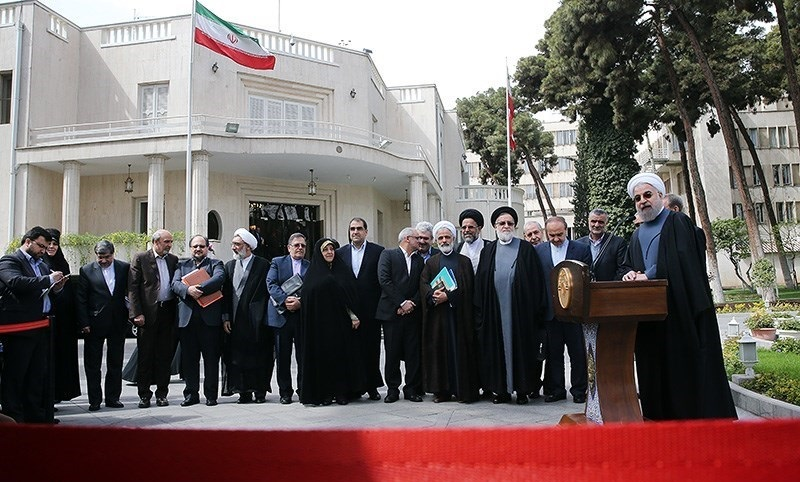
Rouhani speaking after a cabinet meeting

Rouhani announced his cabinet on 4 August. He had a ten-day mandate for introducing his cabinet members to the parliament but he did not use this. Then, parliament voted on his cabinet, which was scheduled on 14–19 August. Between three reformist politicians (Mohammad Reza Aref, Eshaq Jahangiri or Mohammad Shariatmadari) that were likely for the vice presidency, Rouhani appointed former industries minister as vice-president. There were also many candidates for the ministry of foreign affairs: Ali Akbar Salehi, Kamal Kharazi, Sadegh Kharazi, Mohammad Javad Zarif and Mahmoud Vaezi but Zarif became Rouhani's final nominee. Although several names were being circulated for the other ministerial posts before the final announcement, the office of president-elect denied these speculations. On 23 July 2013, it was reported that eight members of Rouhani's cabinet had been finalized: Jahangiri as first vice president, Zarif as foreign minister, Rahmani Fazli as interior minister, Tayebnia as finance minister, Dehghan as defense minister, Namdar Zanganeh as petroleum minister, Najafi as education minister, Chitchian as energy minister, Nematzadeh as industries minister, Hassan Hashemi as health minister and Akhondi as transportation minister. This become official after Rouhani presented the list of his ministry nominates to the parliament on his inauguration day. He also appointed Mohammad Nahavandian as his chief of staff.

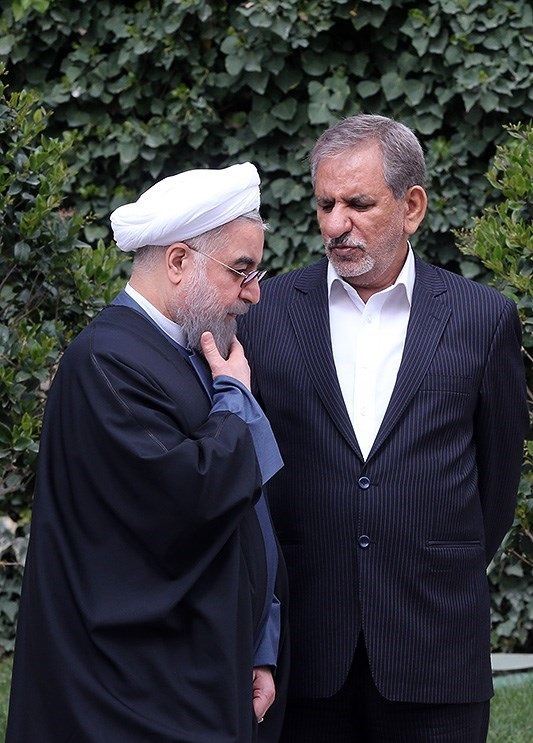
Rouhani with First Vice President, Eshaq Jahangiri, after a cabinet meeting

=== Domestic policy ===
==== Economic ====
The economic policy of Rouhani focuses on the long-term economic development of Iran. It deals with increasing the purchasing power of the public, economic growth, raising sufficient funds, implementation of the general policies of 44th Principle of the Constitution of the Islamic Republic of Iran and improving the business environment in the short term. Rouhani believes that improving the economic conditions of the people should be accomplished by boosting the purchasing power of the people, reducing the wealth gap. He also thinks that equitable distribution of national wealth and economic growth lead to all mentioned economic goals. He states that if national wealth was not created, poverty would be distributed. National wealth creation causes an increase in real income per capita and equitable distribution of wealth. His plan is targeted to increase direct and indirect assistance to low-income groups.

Rouhani is urgently going to regenerate the Management and Planning Organization of Iran. His economic policies also comprise optimal distribution of subsidies, control of liquidity and inflation, speeding economic growth and reducing import. He believes that inflation results in damaging effects on the economy of families and hopes to deflate that in Foresight and Hope Cabinet.

Rouhani plans urgent economic priorities such as control of high inflation, increasing purchasing power and cutting down high unemployment.

==== Culture and media ====
According to a March 2014 report by Center for International Media Assistance, since Rouhani takeover in 2013, "Censorship of the Internet has only gotten worse, but it's more and more clear that Rouhani does not have complete control over this process".

Regarding internet censorship, he has stated: "Gone are the days when a wall could be built around the country. Today there are no more walls." He has also criticized Islamic Republic of Iran Broadcasting for showing trivial foreign news, while ignoring pressing national matters. Rouhani also appeared to pledge his support for increasing Internet access and other political and social freedoms. In an interview, he said: "We want the people, in their private lives, to be completely free, and in today's world having access to information and the right of free dialogue, and the right to think freely, is the right of all peoples, including the people of Iran."

==== Human and women's rights ====
Rouhani has maintained a policy of not publicly addressing human rights issues, on which he may have limited powers.

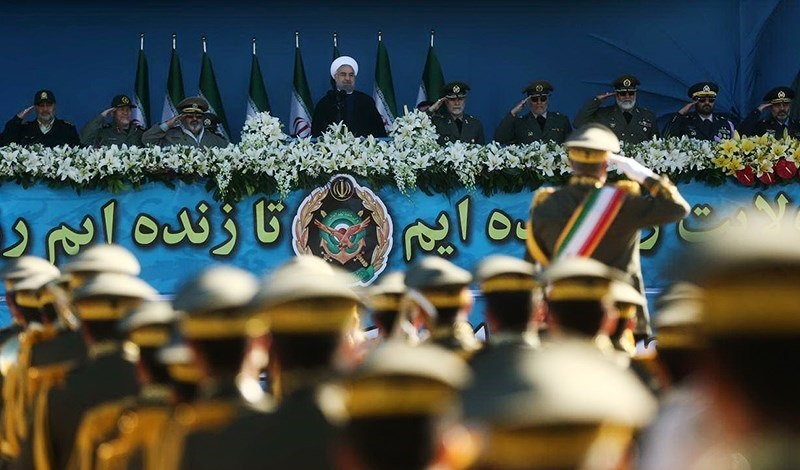
President Rouhani during an Iranian Army Day parade

Rouhani is a supporter of women's rights. In a speech after he was elected as the President of Iran, he said:

There must be equal opportunities for women. There is no difference between man and woman in their creation, in their humanity, in their pursuit of knowledge, in their understanding, in their intelligence, in their religious piety, in serving God and in serving people.

Rouhani's government appointed Elham Aminzadeh, Shahindokht Molaverdi and Masoumeh Ebtekar as vice presidents; as well as Marzieh Afkham, the first female spokesperson for the foreign ministry. Rouhani has promised to set up a ministry for women. Many women's rights activists, however, are reluctant about a ministry for women; because they feel that this ministry may isolate women's issues. It has also been suggested that Rouhani will require a deputy minister position within each ministry to address gender issues and issues pertaining to women.

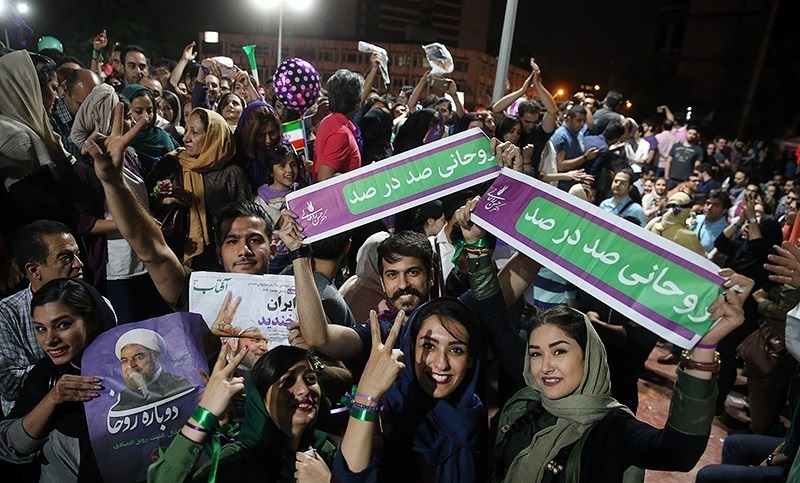
Rouhani's supporters celebrate his presidential victory, May 2017

In September 2013, eleven political prisoners were freed including noted human rights lawyer Nasrin Sotoudeh and Mohsen Aminzadeh. The move came just days before his visit to the United States for the United Nations General Assembly.

Critics say that little has changed in domestic policy since Rouhani took office. Iranian authorities executed 599 people during Rouhani's first 14 months in power, compared with 596 during the last year in office of his predecessor, Mahmoud Ahmadinejad. Iran has the highest number of executions anywhere in the world, apart from China. Nobel Peace Prize winner Shirin Ebadi has criticized Rouhani's human rights record. She cited the increase in executions, Abdolfattah Soltani's hunger strike, and the continued house arrest of Mir Hossein Mousavi and Mahdi Karroubi. An Iranian spokesperson said Ebadi's comments would end up provoking animosity towards Iran.

In 2015, Rouhani appointed Marzieh Afkham and Saleh Adibi, as the first female since the 1979 (the second in history) and the first Sunni Kurd respectively, to hold office as ambassadors.

=== Foreign policy ===
Rouhani's foreign policy has been contained by the conservatism of Iranian Principlists, who fear change, while also realizing it is necessary. Furthermore, Iran's foreign policy, which was deadlocked by the efforts of Mahmoud Ahmadinejad, needs new predecessor by cautious and decisive efforts of Rouhani. The main task of Rouhani is only to develop dialogues between Iran and Political rivals including P5+1. This course can help lift sanctions that damaged the Iranian economy.

In March 2015, Rouhani sent a letter to President Obama and the heads of the other five countries negotiating with Iran, explaining Iran's stance. He announced it on his Twitter account. The US National Security Council confirmed that the letter had been passed on to the U.S. negotiating team, but its contents were not released. Rouhani also spoke by phone with the leaders of all the nations involved in the negotiations, except for the United States.

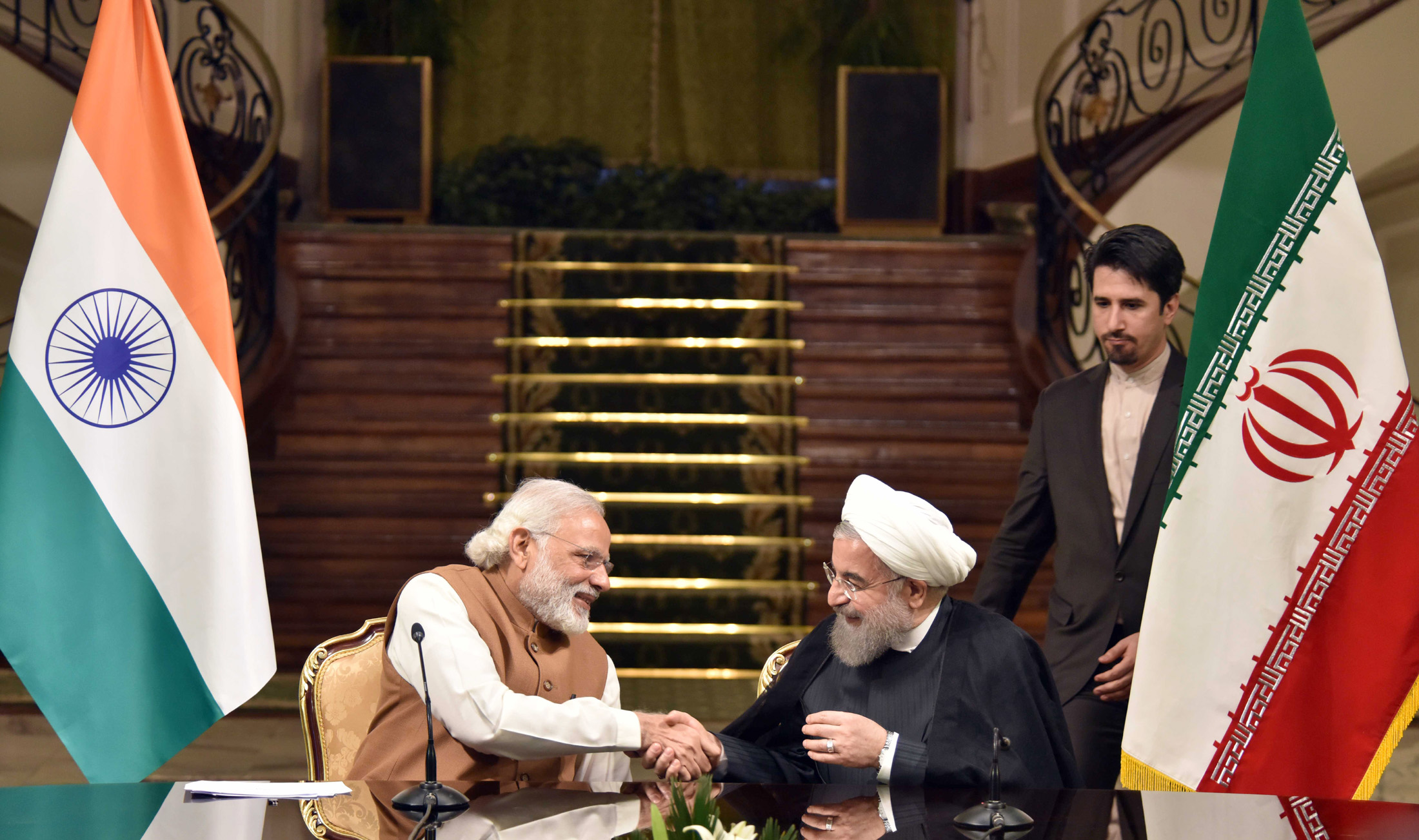
Rouhani with Indian Prime Minister Narendra Modi, 23 May 2016

==== United Kingdom ====
Rouhani met with British Prime Minister David Cameron, marking the first time since the 1979 Islamic revolution that the leaders of Iran and the United Kingdom have met. On 20 February 2014 the Iranian Embassy in London was restored and the two countries agreed to restart diplomatic relations. On 23 August 2015 the embassy was officially reopened.

==== United States ====
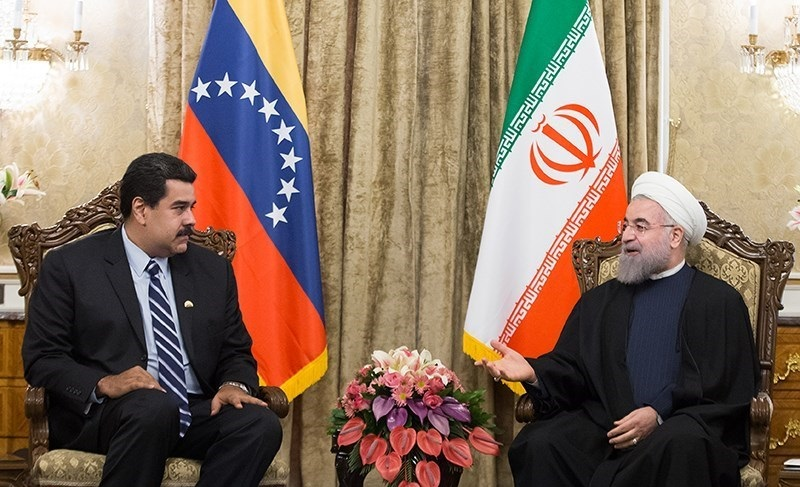
Rouhani with Venezuelan President Nicolás Maduro in Tehran, November 2015

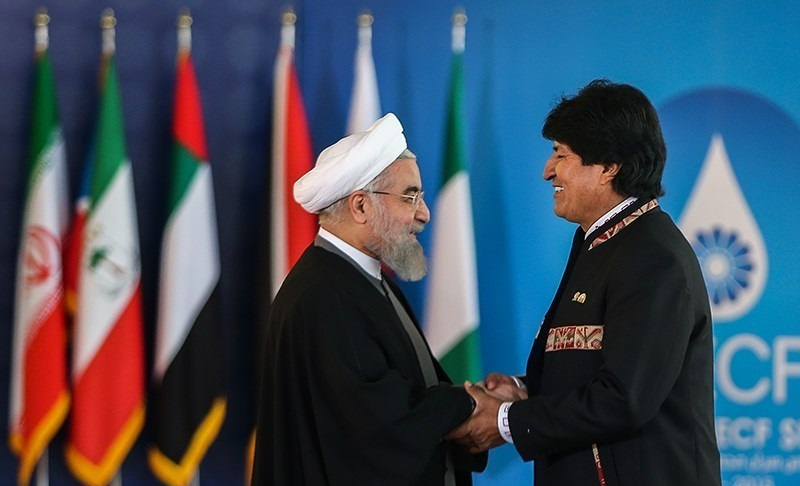
Rouhani with Bolivian President Evo Morales in Tehran, November 2015

Rouhani's visit to New York City in September 2013 was hailed as major progress in Iran's relations with the United States. He previously said that his government is ready to hold talks with the United States after thirty-two years. Rouhani denied reports that during his trip he had refused a meeting with U.S. President Barack Obama, and felt more time was needed to coordinate such a meeting. On 27 September 2013, a day after the two countries foreign ministers met during the P5+1 and Iran talks, Rouhani had a phone call with President Obama that marked two countries' highest political exchange since 1979. However, due to this phone call Rouhani was protested by conservatives who chanted "death to America" when he returned to Tehran.

In February 2019, Rouhani condemned the United States for trying to topple Iran's ally, Venezuelan President Nicolás Maduro.

On 3 January 2020, the second most powerful person in Iran, Qasem Soleimani, was killed by the United States, which considerably heightened the existing tensions between the two countries. Rouhani said that Iran "will take revenge".

After Joe Biden won the US presidential election in November 2020 against Donald Trump, Rouhani stated that it was an opportunity for Biden's administration to "compensate for previous mistakes".

==== Syria ====
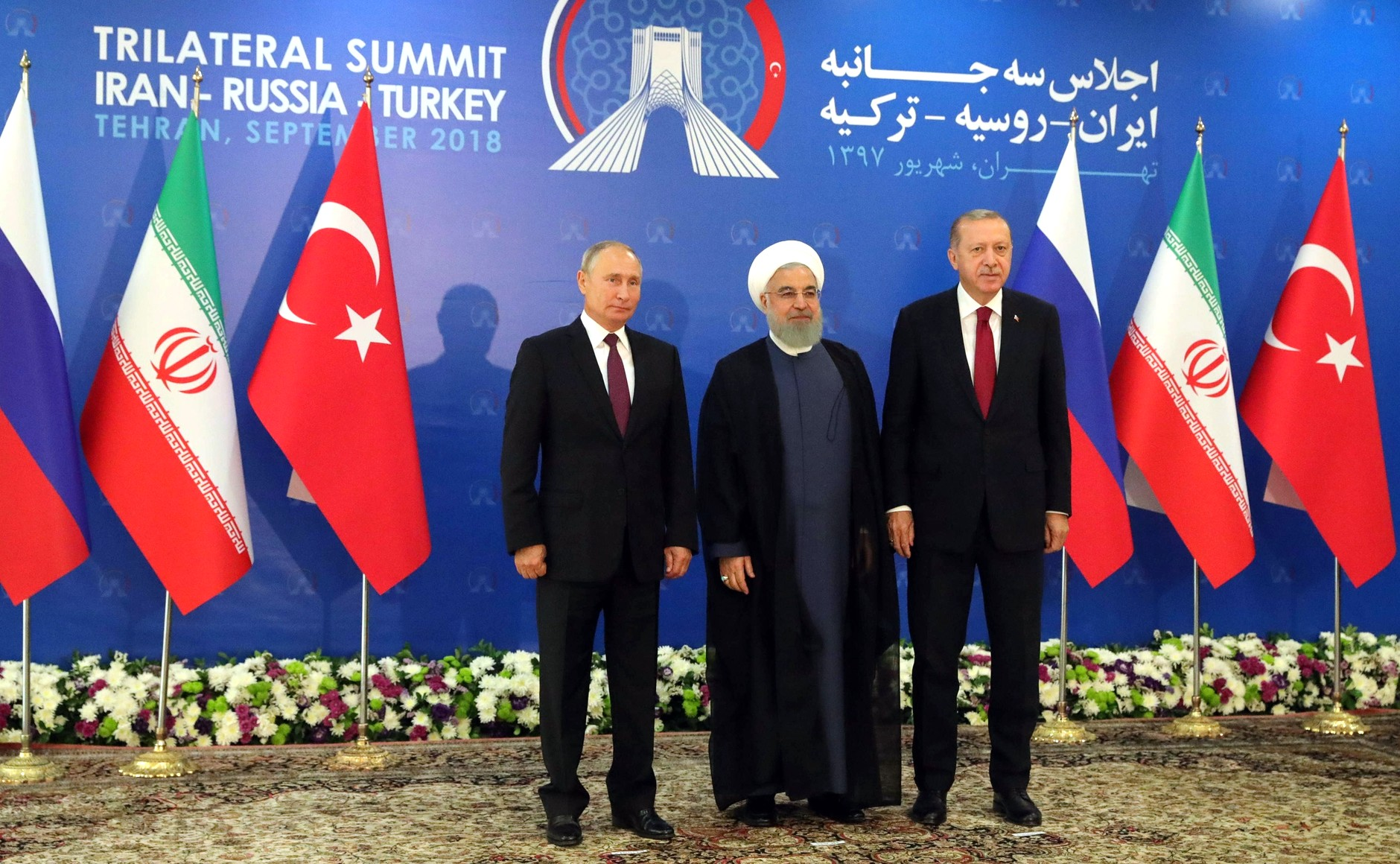
Rouhani, Russian President Vladimir Putin and Turkish President Recep Tayyip Erdoğan. Tehran, 7 September 2018

It is generally assumed that he will follow the ruling establishment in completely supporting Bashar al-Assad, Syria's contentious president, in the Syrian Civil War, as well as "strengthening the Shia Crescent" that runs from southern Lebanon, through Syria, Iraq and into Iran. In his first press conference after winning the presidential election, Rouhani said that "the ultimate responsibility to resolve the Syrian civil war should be in the hands of the Syrian people."

==== Iraq ====
Rouhani has termed Iran–Iraq relations "brotherly" and signed several agreements with Iraq. Right after the Northern Iraq offensive, Iran was the first country to send support for Iraq and is a "key player" in Military intervention against the ISIL.

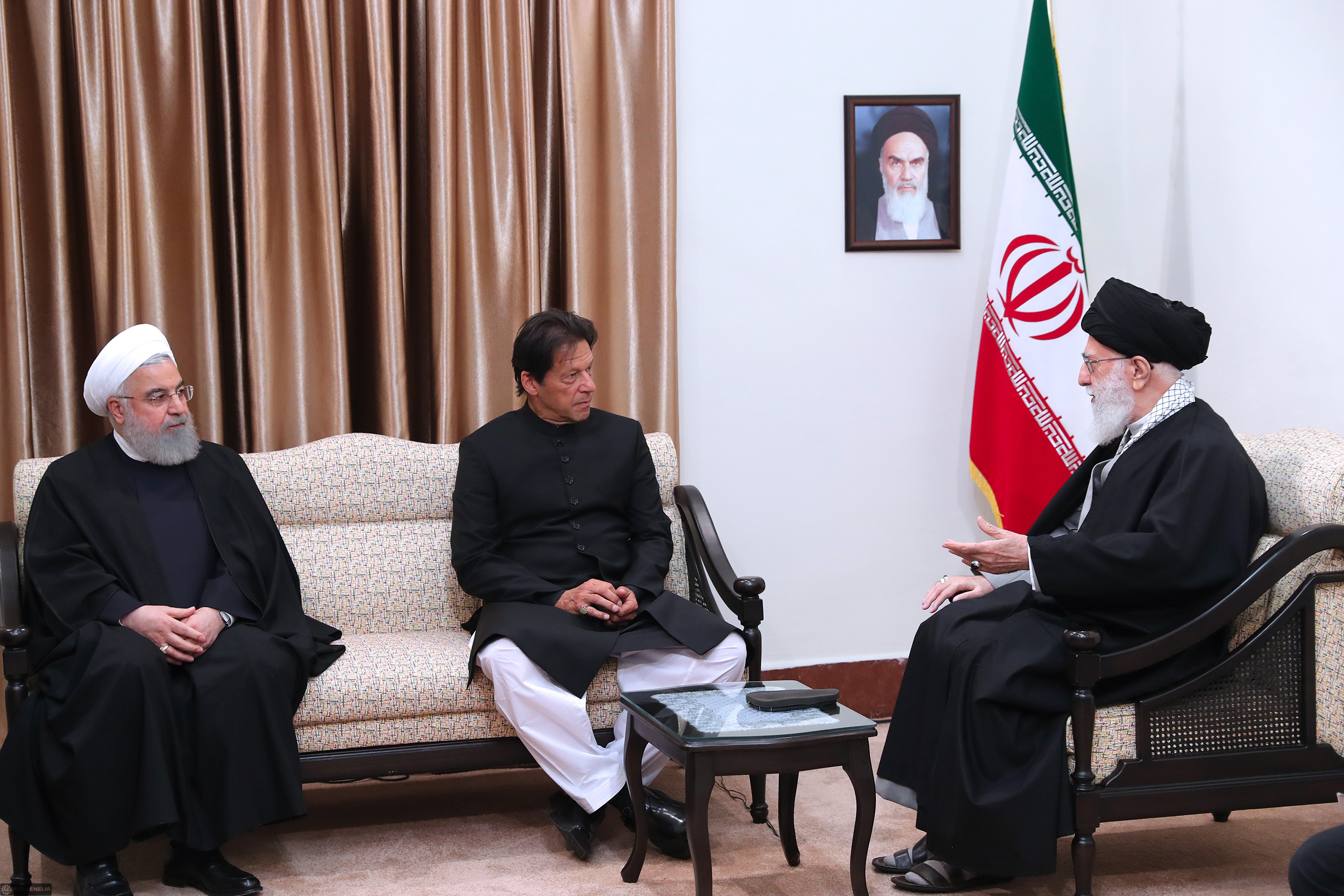
Ali Khamenei and Rouhani with Pakistan Prime Minister Imran Khan, 22 April 2019

==== Saudi Arabia ====
On Iran's relationship to Saudi Arabia, Rouhani wrote that during the Khatami administration, he, as the secretary-general of the National Security Council at that time, reached "a comprehensive and strategic agreement" with the Saudis, but that this agreement was not upheld during the Ahmadinejad government. Specifically, while discussing the episode, he stated:

there was a consensus [during Khatami's administration] that we should have good relations with Saudi Arabia. No one within the nezaam [regime] was opposed to it. I went to Saudi Arabia for the first time in 1998. At that time Saudi Arabia had accused us of involvement in the Khobar Towers bombing. I went to Saudi Arabia as the secretary-general of the SNSC. From their side, [Minister of Interior] Nayef bin Abdulaziz took part in the negotiations. The negotiations began at 10 p.m. and lasted until 5 a.m. the next morning. We finally agreed on a security agreement. I returned to Saudi Arabia in [early] 2005, and had extensive discussions about the region, mutual problems between us, and the nuclear issue. We agreed with Nayef to form four committees. They were supposed to convene every few months and pursue the issues. After I left [the post of] secretary-general, none of the committees were formed and there were no meetings.

— Hassan Rouhani, Sterateji-ye Amniat-e Melli Jomhouri-ye Eslami-ye Iran (National Security Strategy of the Islamic Republic of Iran)

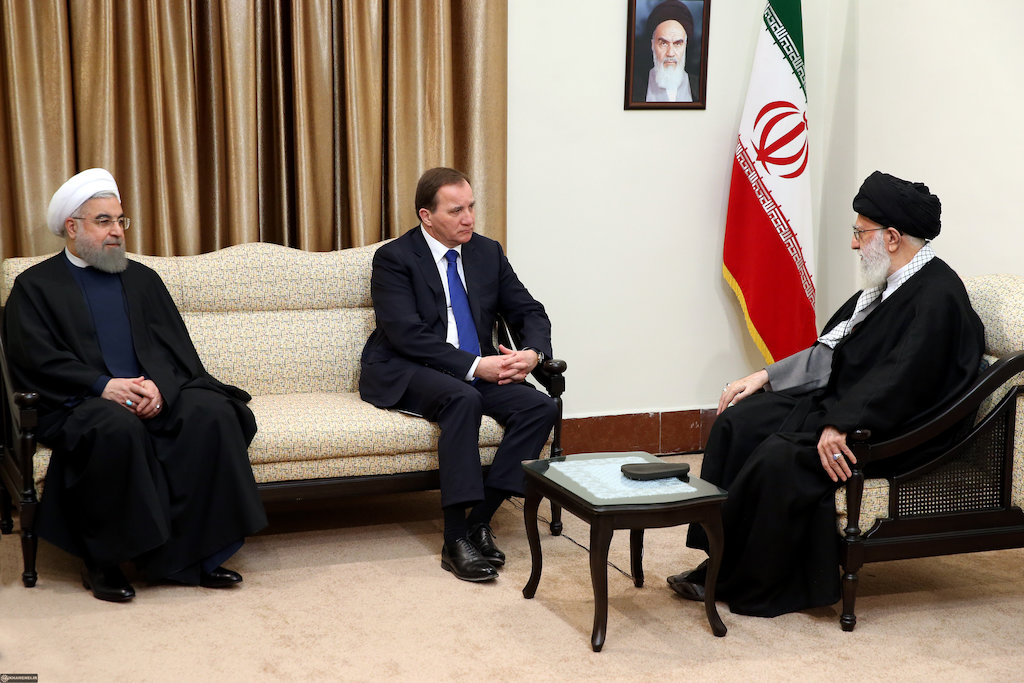
Rouhani and Ali Khamenei with Swedish Prime Minister Stefan Löfven, 11 February 2017

Rouhani has criticized Saudi Arabian-led military intervention in Yemen, saying: "Don't bomb children, elderly men and women in Yemen. Attacking the oppressed will bring disgrace."

==== Israel ====
Rouhani has described Israel as "an occupier and usurper government" that "does injustice to the people of the region, and has brought instability to the region, with its warmongering policies", and a "cancerous tumor established by Western countries to advance their interests in the Middle East."

When asked in an interview with CNN to clarify his opinion about the Holocaust, Rouhani replied: "... in general, I can tell you that any crime that happens in history against humanity, including the crime the Nazis created towards the Jews as well as non-Jews is reprehensible and condemnable. Whatever criminality they committed against the Jews, we condemn". The live translation of his statements included explicit mention of the Holocaust, leading to media reports that he had acknowledged its existence, in contrast to the persistent denial of his predecessor. However, Iranian state media contradicted this, accusing CNN of deliberate mistranslation. Independent translations, including one by the Wall Street Journal, supported the position that Rouhani had not explicitly accepted the Holocaust's existence.

Rouhani termed the peace agreement between Israel and the United Arab Emirates a "huge mistake" and warned the UAE against permitting Israel to have a secure presence in the Persian Gulf.

=== Public image and perception ===
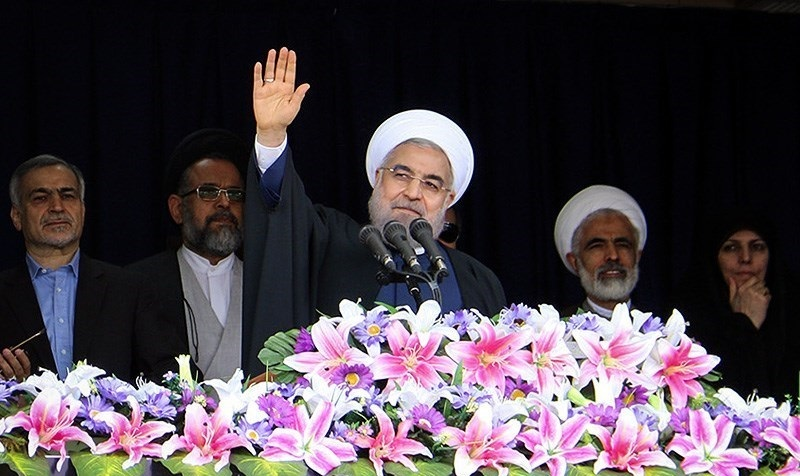
Rouhani during a visit to Semnan, 17 April 2016

According to a poll conducted in March 2016 by Information and Public Opinion Solutions LLC (iPOS) among Iranian citizens, Rouhani had 75% approval and 12% disapproval ratings and thus a +54% net popularity, making him the second most popular politician in Iran, after Mohammad Javad Zarif with +69% net popularity. Rouhani surpassed Hassan Khomeini (+52%), Mohammad Khatami (+43%) and Akbar Hashemi Rafsanjani (+38%) who took the following places. The firm stated with 95% confidence that the margin of sampling error was ±3 percentage points.

==== Job approval ====
Rouhani began his presidency in November 2013 with approval and disapproval ratings near 58% and 27% respectively, according to Information and Public Opinion Solutions LLC (iPOS) which was assessing it on a quarterly basis. It gradually fell to 48% and he recorded a 33% disapproval rating in May 2015. His job approval rose after Joint Comprehensive Plan of Action, according to a survey conducted by IranPoll for the University of Maryland's Center for International and Security Studies (CISSM), standing at 88% with a large majority (61%) expressing a "very favorable view" of him (up from 51% in July 2014) and a ±3.2 margin of sampling error. The poll also indicated Rouhani would have a "tough challenge" in maintaining the support due to the fact that people had high economic expectations from the deal, and it could become his Achilles' heel. iPOS recorded a 54% approval and 24% disapproval days after the deal in August 2015. The trend continued until February 2016, with 67% and 18% approval and disapproval ratings, marking his highest level since taking office.

== Post-presidency ==
On 24 January 2024, Rouhani said that he had been excluded by the Guardian Council from its shortlist of candidates for elections to the Assembly of Experts to be held in March 2024. He criticized the decision, saying that "the minority that rules officially and publicly wants to reduce people's participation in elections."

In 2024, Rouhani criticised the reinstatement of Iran's morality police and the implementation of the "Noor plan" by law enforcement authorities. He expressed shock over the hijab law approved by the Guardian Council which proscribed severe punishment for those violating it, saying that it "aligns neither with the Constitution, nor with justice, nor with the Qur'an and Islamic culture."

== Political positions ==
Rouhani is considered to be a moderate and pragmatic politician. In 2000, the Washington Institute for Near East Policy described him as "power-hungry". He was elected as president with heavy reformist support, and he pledged to follow through with reformist demands and to bridge divides between reformists and conservatives.

During his 2017 reelection campaign, Rouhani's views moved firmly to the left and he fully aligned with the reformist faction.

== Electoral history ==
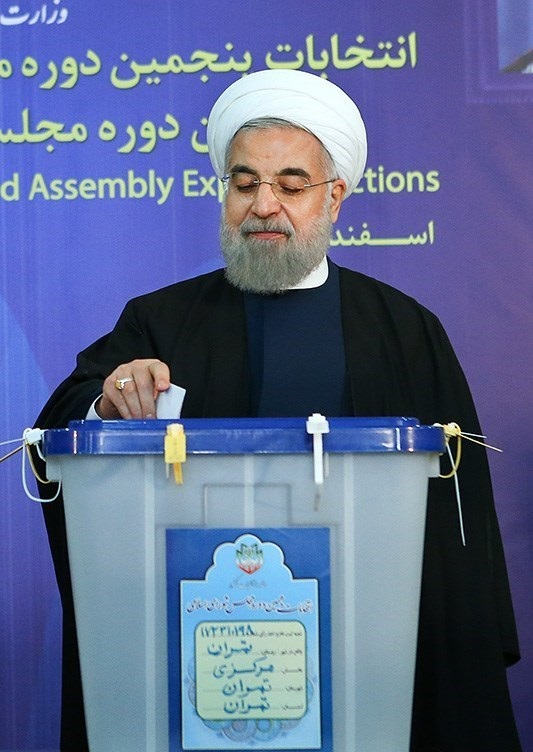
Rouhani casting his vote in the 2016 elections

Year	Election	Votes	%	Rank	Notes
1980	Parliament	19,017	62.1	1st	Won
1984	Parliament	729,965	58.3	17th	Won
1988	Parliament	▼412,895	▼42.1		Won
1992	Parliament	▲432,767	▲47		Won
1996	Parliament	▲465,440	▼32.5		Won
2000	Parliament	▲498,916	▼17.02	40th	Lost
2000	Assembly of Experts mid-term	120,819	47.56	1st	Won
2006	Assembly of Experts	844,190		7th	Won
2013	President	18,613,329	50.88	1st	Won
2016	Assembly of Experts	▲2,238,166	▲49.72	3rd	Won
2017	President	▲23,636,652	▲57.14	1st	Won

== Publications ==
Having the rank of research professor at Iran's Center for Strategic Research, he has written many books and articles in Persian, English and Arabic, including the following:

Persian

- Islamic Revolution: Roots and Challenges (انقلاب اسلامی؛ ریشه‌ها و چالش‌ها), June 1997, ISBN 9649102507
- Fundaments of Political Thoughts of Imam Khomeini (مبانی تفکر سیاسی امام خمینی), July 1999
- Memoirs of Dr. Hassan Rouhani; Vol. 1: The Islamic Revolution (خاطرات دکتر حسن روحانی؛ جلد اول: انقلاب اسلامی), February 2008, ISBN 9786005914801
- Introduction to Islamic Countries (آشنایی با کشورهای اسلامی), November 2008
- Islamic Political Thought; Vol. 1: Conceptual Framework (اندیشه‌های سیاسی اسلام؛ جلد اول: مبانی نظری), December 2009, ISBN 9789649539409
- Islamic Political Thought; Vol. 2: Foreign Policy (اندیشه‌های سیاسی اسلام؛ جلد دوم: سیاست خارجی), December 2009, ISBN 9789649539416
- Islamic Political Thought; Vol. 3: Cultural and Social Issues (اندیشه‌های سیاسی اسلام؛ جلد سوم: مسائل فرهنگی و اجتماعی), December 2009, ISBN 9789649539423
- National Security and Economic System of Iran (امنیت ملی و نظام اقتصادی ایران), August 2010, ISBN 9786005247947
- National Security and Nuclear Diplomacy (امنیت ملی و دیپلماسی هسته‌ای), January 2011, ISBN 9786002900074
- Role of Seminaries in Moral and Political Developments of Society (نقش حوزه‌های علمیه در تحولات اخلاقی و سیاسی جامعه), November 2011
- An Introduction to the History of Shia' Imams (مقدمه‌ای بر تاریخ امامان شیعه), March 2012, ISBN 9786005914948
- Age of Legal Capacity and Responsibility (سن اهلیت و مسئولیت قانونی), October 2012, ISBN 9786002900135
- Memoirs of Dr. Hassan Rouhani; Vol. 2: Sacred Defense (خاطرات دکتر حسن روحانی؛ جلد دوم: دفاع مقدس), January 2013
- Narration of Foresight and Hope (روایت تدبیر و امید), March 2013
- National Security and Foreign Policy (امنیت ملی و سیاست خارجی), May 2013
- National Security and Environment (امنیت ملی و محیط‌زیست), May 2013

English

- The Islamic Legislative Power, May 1994
- The Flexibility of Shariah; Islamic Law, April 1996

Arabic

- Comments on Fiqh (Islamic Jurisprudence); Lessons of the Late Muhaqqiq Damaad (تقريرات درس فقه مرحوم محقق داماد) (Chapter on Prayers [صلاة]), November 2012
- Comments on Usul (Principles of Fiqh); Lessons of the Late Ayatollah Haeri (تقریرات درس اصول مرحوم حائری) (Chapter on Academic Principles [أصول علمیّة]), March 2013

== See also ==
- Muhammad Kazim Khurasani
- Mirza Husayn Tehrani
- Abdallah Mazandarani
- Mirza Ali Aqa Tabrizi
- Mirza Sayyed Mohammad Tabatabai
- Seyyed Abdollah Behbahani
- Fazlullah Nouri
- List of heads of the executive by approval rating

== Notes ==
Political offices
New office	Secretary of the Supreme National Security Council; 1989–2005	Succeeded by Ali Larijani
Preceded by Mahmoud Ahmadinejad	President of Iran; 2013–2021	Succeeded by Ebrahim Raisi
Academic offices
Preceded by Mohammad Mousavi Khoeiniha	President of the Center for Strategic Research; 1992–2013	Succeeded by Ali Akbar Velayati
Diplomatic posts
New title Position created	Chief Nuclear Negotiator of Iran; 2003–2005	Succeeded by Ali Larijani
Preceded by Mahmoud Ahmadinejad	Secretary General of the Non-Aligned Movement; 2013–2016	Succeeded by Nicolás Maduro
