= 2005 Iranian presidential election =

- 17 June 2005 (first round); 24 June 2005 (second round)
- Turnout: 62.66% (first round); 59.84% (second round)
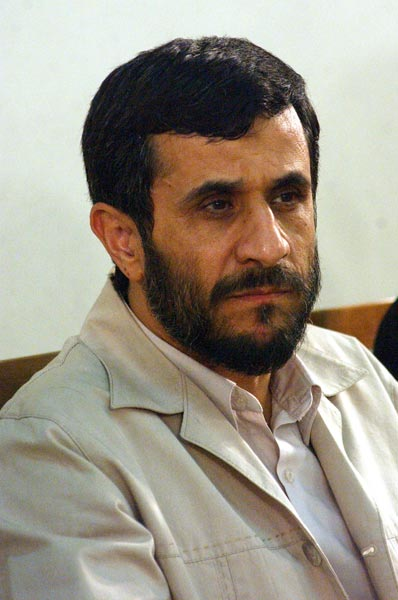

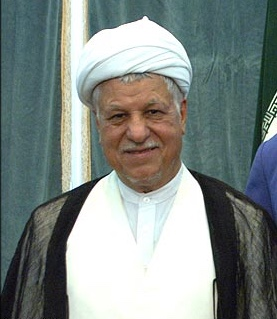
Nominee	Mahmoud Ahmadinejad	Akbar Rafsanjani
Party	ABII	CCA
Alliance	Principlists	Reformists
Popular vote	17,284,782	10,046,701
Percentage	63.24%	36.76%
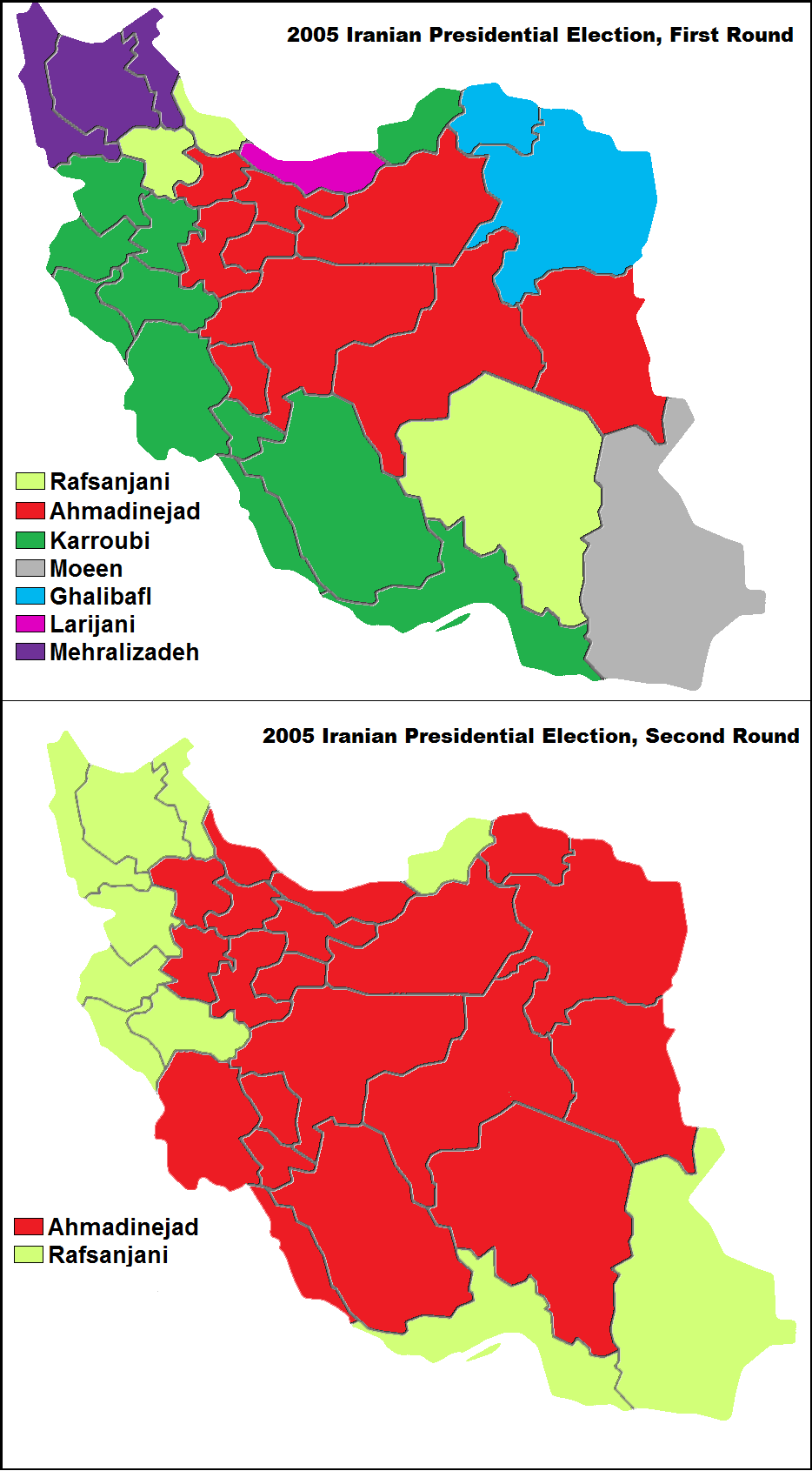
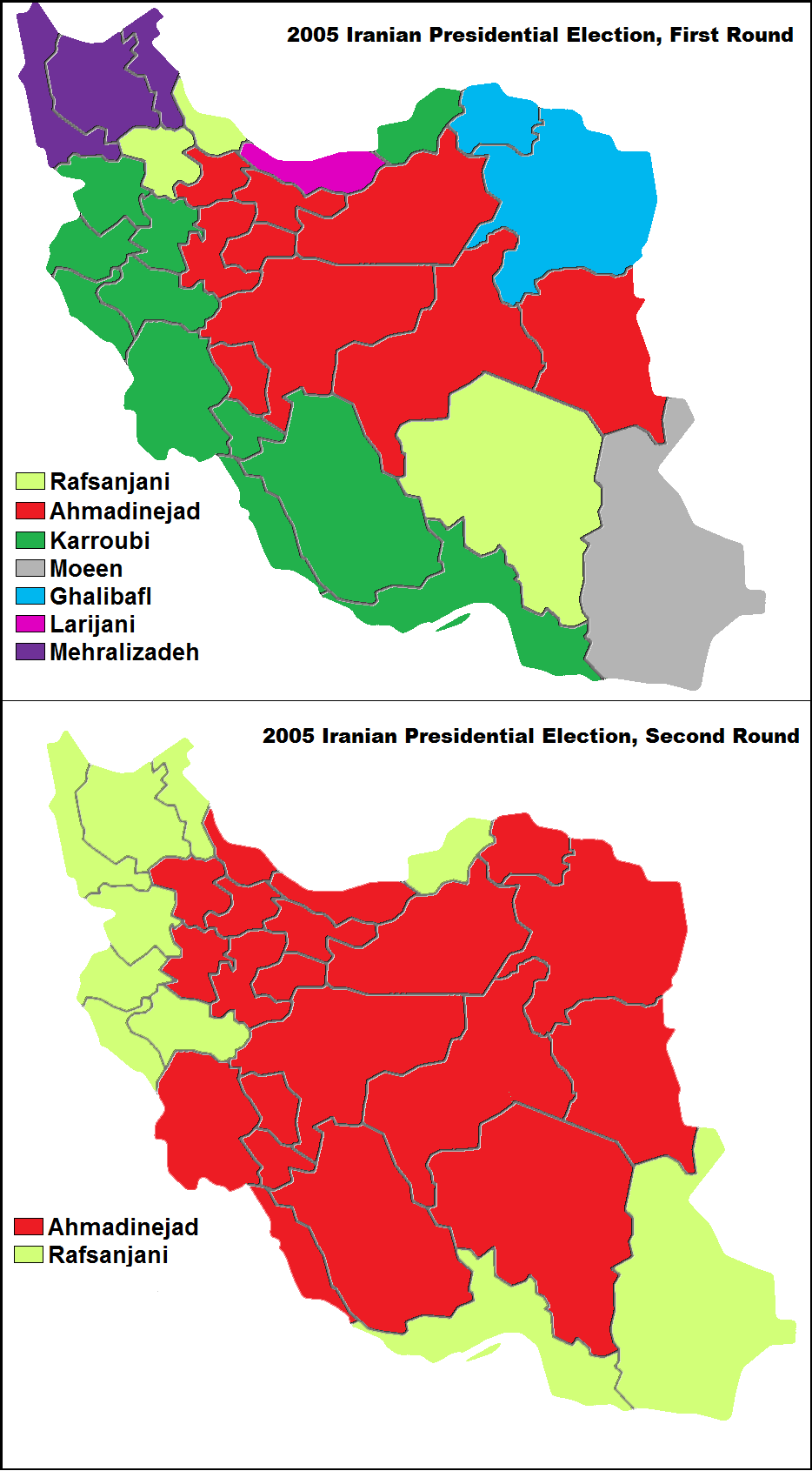
President before election
Mohammad Khatami
ACC
Elected President
Mahmoud Ahmadinejad
ABII

Presidential elections were held in Iran 17 June 2005, with a second round run-off on 24 June. Mohammad Khatami, the outgoing president of Iran, stepped down on 2 August 2005, after serving his maximum two consecutive four-year terms according to the Islamic republic's constitution.

As no candidate received a majority of the vote in the first round, a run-off was held between the top two candidates, former president (1989–1997) Akbar Rafsanjanī and Mahmoud Ahmadinejad, the hardline mayor of Tehran. Although Ahmadinejad had finished second in the first round of voting, he won the second round with 63% of the vote. Factors thought to have contributed to Ahmadinejad's victory include mobilization of mosque networks and conservative/hardline voters, and a protest vote against corrupt elite insiders and for "new political blood". He was a loyal supporter of conservative Supreme Leader Khamenei.

== Schedule ==
Schedule of the election had been decided between the Ministry of Interior and the Guardian Council for 17 June 2005. The election will continue as a runoff race, which will take place a week later than the first round of elections, on 24 June 2005. The registration of candidates began on 10 May 2005 and continued for five days, until 14 May. If the Guardian Council had requested, it may have been extended for five more days, until 19 May. The candidates were not allowed to do advertisements, until the final list of approved candidates are known. The official period for advertisement was from 27 May to 15 June.

In the first round, Iranian nationals born on or before 17 June 1990, residing in or outside Iran, were able to vote. The election in Iran began on 09:00 local time (04:30 UTC) and while the original deadline was ten hours later on 19:00 (14:30 UTC), the deadline was extended three times by the Ministry of Interior, finally until 23:00 (18:30 UTC). Outside Iran, different times are used as the opening and closing hours for the polling offices. On the same date, mid-term Majlis elections for Gachsaran, Garmsar, Ghazvin, Ilam, Iranshahr, Jolfa, Marand, Sarbaz, and Shiraz took place together with the runoff elections of Tehran for the Iranian Majlis election of 2004.

The first three suggestions by the Ministry, for 13 May, 20 May and 10 June 2005, had been rejected by the council. The Ministry had mentioned that it is concerned that an election later than 20 May may collide with the final exams of the elementary schools and high schools.

The second round of the election occurred on 24 June and Iranian nationals born on or before 24 June 1990 were able to vote. The election in Iran began at 09:00 local time (04:30 UTC) and the closing time of the voting polls was at 19:00 (14:30 UTC), but was subject to extension by the Ministry of Interior.

== Candidates ==
The registration of the candidates finished on 14 May 2005 and 1014 candidates had registered to run, including many people who did not have the qualifications required in the law. More than 90% of the candidates were men, and there were about ninety female candidates. The law about the election process does not include any requirements for people who want to register to run: it only provides qualifications that are to be checked by the Guardian Council.

The candidates must have first be approved by the Guardian Council before being put to public vote and it could be predicted that some of the candidates would not win the approval, especially Ebrahim Asgharzadeh and Ebrahim Yazdi, who were rejected by the Council in the parliamentary elections of 2004 and/or the presidential elections of 2001. There were also some people who expected Mostafa Moeen, the most controversial reformist candidate, to be disqualified as well. But the most unpredictable was the disqualification of conservative Reza Zavare'i, a former member of the Guardian Council and an approved presidential candidate for two previous elections.

Also, there was a high probability of rejection of women, because of an ambiguous term ("rejāl", رجال) in the Constitution of Iran, a requirement for presidential candidates, which may be interpreted as either "men" or "nobles". The Guardian Council, who is also the official interpreter of the constitution, has mentioned on previous elections that the restriction has not been considered in depth yet, since according to the council's opinion there were no women registered to run for presidency who fulfilled the other requirements of the constitution; but still, the Council believes that the requirement of rejal would not match women.

There had also been discussions for a new law proposed in the Majlis, restricting the maximum age of the candidates for the presidential elections. This was widely seen as an attempt to limit the participation of Akbar Rafsanjanī and Mehdi Karroubi. The attempt failed with no proposal appearing.

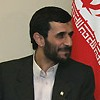
Mahmoud Ahmadinejad

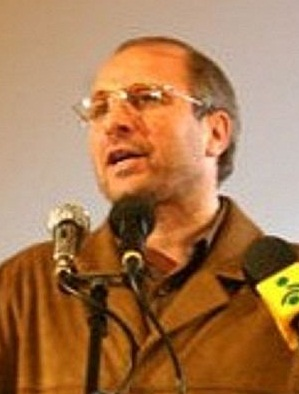
Mohammad Bagher Ghalibaf

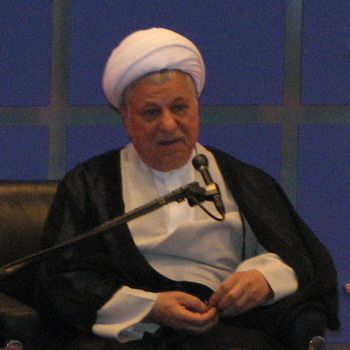
Akbar Rafsanjanī

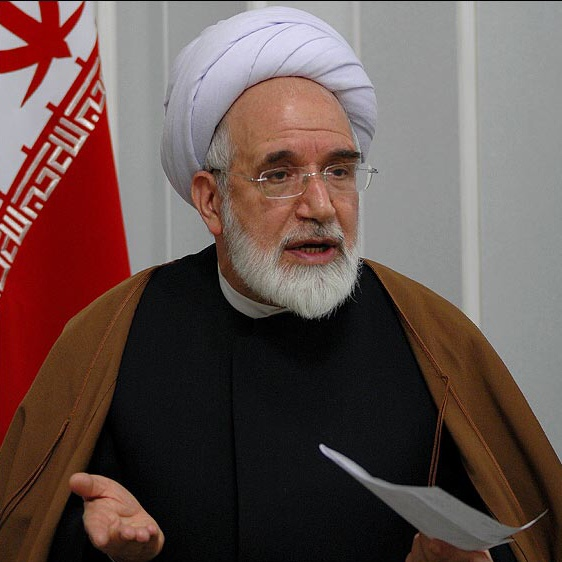
Mehdi Karroubi

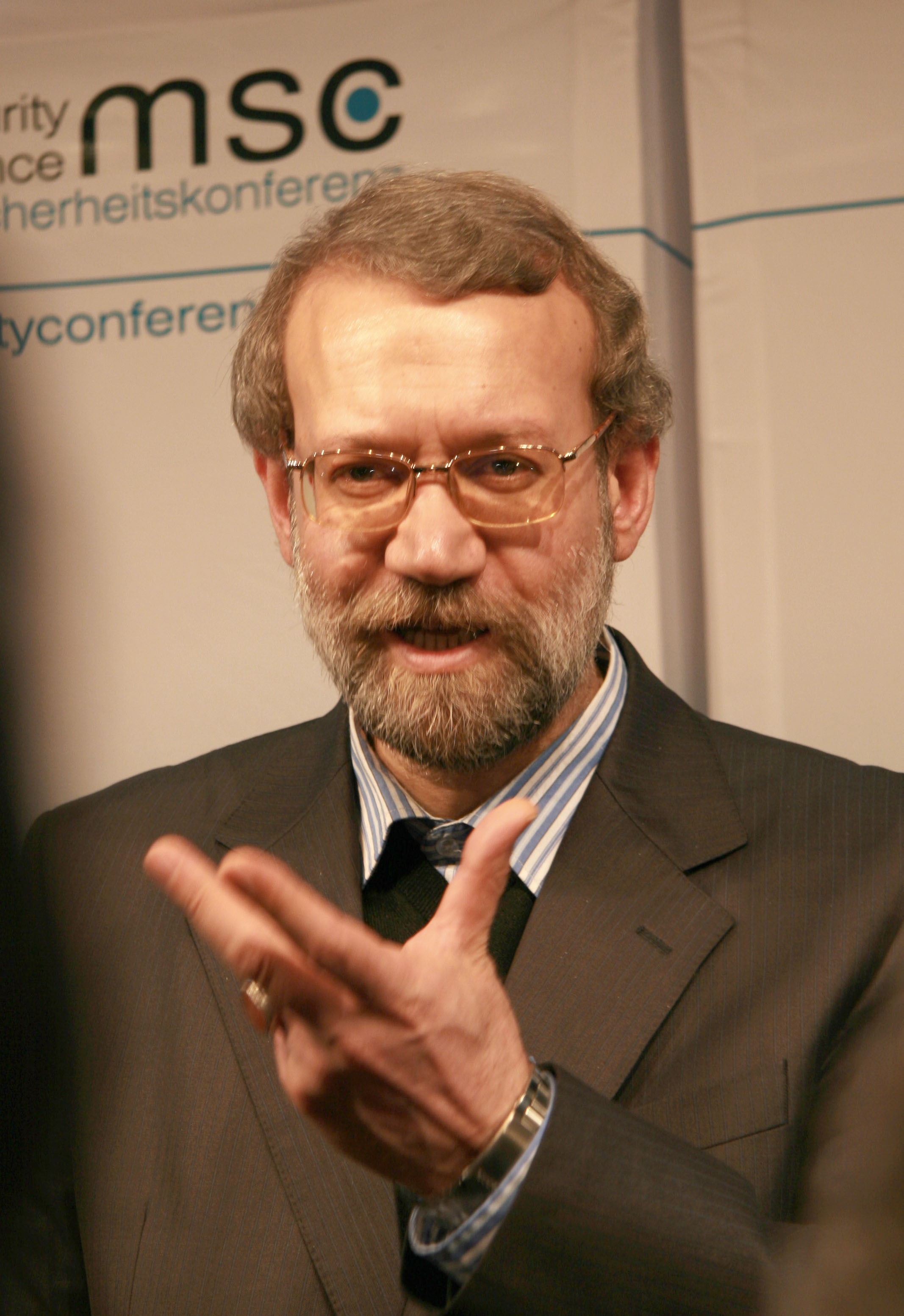
Ali Larijani

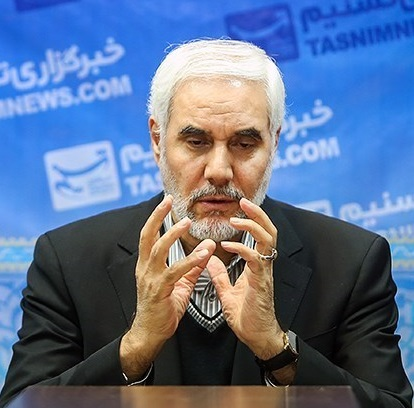
Mohsen Mehralizadeh

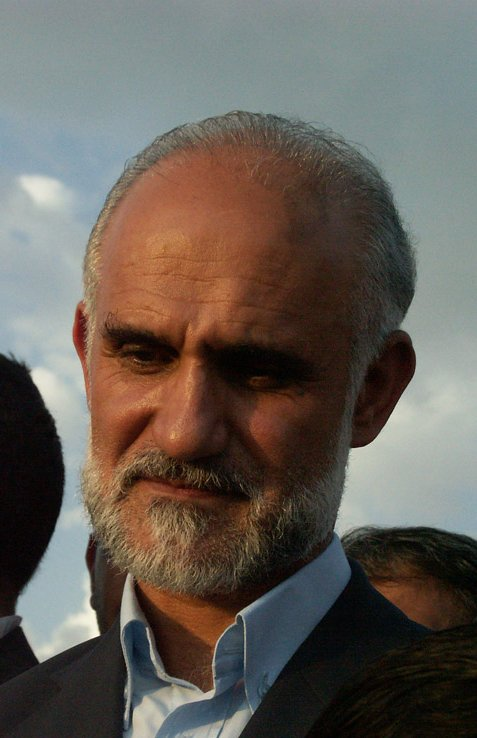
Mostafa Moeen

=== Approved candidates ===
The list of all the people who have officially registered to run for the post is not available to the public, but the Guardian Council published a final list of six approved candidates on 22 May rejecting all independent candidates and some candidates from the both wings, specially the reformist candidates Mostafa Moeen and Mohsen Mehralizadeh. This raised many objections among the general public and the political parties, including student protests in the Tehran University, among other universities. This, and the objections of some of the approved candidates, led to a letter from Ayatollah Khamenei, the Supreme Leader, to the Guardian Council asking for the approval of Moeen and Mehralizadeh (this had apparently been because of a request by Haddad-Adel, the conservative Speaker of the Parliament). It is unknown if that letter meant that the Guardian Council must have approved these two, or it should have only reconsidered their case. The next day, on 23 May, the Guardian Council announced the approval of Moeen and Mehralizadeh.

Mohsen Rezaee, one of the approved conservative candidates, who is the Secretary of Expediency Discernment Council and a previous commander of the Iran–Iraq War, withdrew in the evening of 15 June.

These were the candidates approved by the Council of Guardians:

==== Trans-party ====
- Akbar Rafsanjanī, Chairman of the Expediency Discernment Council and a former President of Iran, who won the support of several parties from both of the wings, but was considered to lean towards the conservatives more than towards the reformists. Ironically, the reformist alliance considered him as a possible candidate of theirs more than the conservative alliance. He was invited to run for president by Executives of Construction Party (reformist), Combatant Clergy Association (conservative), Islamic Labour Party (conservative), and Workers' House (reformist), as well as several other parties across the whole spectrum of positions. Rafsanjani confirmed he is running for the election on 10 May after much speculation.

==== Reformists ====
- Mehdi Karroubi, former Majlis Speaker, Secretary General of Association of Combatant Clerics (MCS), supported by MCS, Islamic Association of Engineers, Majma'-e Gorooh-haa-ye Khat-te Emam, and Democracy Party of Iran.
- Mohsen Mehralizadeh, vice-president and head of National Sports Organization, member of IIPF. Mehralizadeh has first announced that he would be running for the post on behalf of the Iranian younger generation, but not if the reformist alliance reached consensus on another candidate, but during the registration mentioned that he would remain in the race until the end.
- Mostafa Moeen, former Minister of Science, Research and Technology, supported by Islamic Iran Participation Front (IIPF) and Mojahedin of the Islamic Revolution Organization (MIRO). Confirmed to run on 29 December 2004. IIPF, an influential reformist party in Iran, has mentioned that they won't support any presidential candidate outside the party, except Mousavi and Moeen. Since Mousavi has declined to run, they supported Moeen, whom they claimed to be the most probable candidate to win the approval of other parties in the reformist alliance. Some conservative Majlis representatives had asked for the Guardian Council's rejection of Moeen, which happened finally but was reversed after a letter by Ayatollah Khamenei. Moeen had announced that he would choose Mohammad Reza Khatami as his First Vice President if he was elected, and had already chosen Elaheh Koulaee, a female representative of the sixth Islamic Assembly, as his spokeswoman.

==== Conservatives ====
- Mahmoud Ahmadinejad, Mayor of Tehran, member of Islamic Society of Engineers (ISE), supported by some parts of Alliance of Builders of Islamic Iran (ABII). Although Ahmadinejad said he would not seek nomination on 2 February 2005, he returned to the scene later.
- Mohammad Bagher Ghalibaf, former Commander of Police (niroo-ye entezaami), partially supported by the Alliance of Builders. Contrary to the public announcement of Ayatollah Khamenei, the Supreme Leader of Iran, that nobody knows who he will personally vote for, Ghalibaf had claimed privately that he is the person Khamenei will vote for.
- Ali Larijani, Supreme Leader's representative in National Security Council and a former director of IRIB, who was supposed to be the major conservative candidate, as chosen by his party, the Islamic Society of Engineers, as well as the "Council for Coordinating the Revolution Forces" (showrā-ye hamāhangi-e nirūhā-ye enǧelāb), a council of some older and very influential leaders of the conservative alliance.

=== Rejected candidates ===
- Reformists
  - Akbar A'lami, Majlis representative of Tabriz.
  - Ebrahim Asgharzadeh, former member of Tehran city council, Secretary General of Islamic Iran Solidarity Party (Hezb-e Hambastegi-e Irān-e Eslāmi), and one of the hostage-takers in Iran hostage crisis. Asgharzadeh was even not supported by his own party (Islamic Iran Solidarity Party). Asgharzadeh was rejected by the Guardian Council to run as a candidate in the 2001 presidential elections, which had made him unlikely to be approved this time.
  - Mostafa Kavakebian, secretary-general of Democracy Party (hezb-e mardomsālāri). Kavakebian supported Karroubi after he himself was rejected.
- Conservatives
  - Zabihollah Bakhshi, commonly known as Haji Bakhshi, militia leader
  - Rafat Bayat, Majlis representative from Zanjan, a member of conservative caucus in parliament. On 30 March, she stated that she would run independently, not supported by any significant party in the conservative alliance. It was assumed by some people that she would probably get rejected by the Guardian Council, because of the rejāl requirement (see above).
  - Reza Zavare'i, former member of Guardian Council, invited to run by Chekaad-e Daaneshjooyaan-e Mosalmaan
- Independents
  - Nasser Hejazi, former goalkeeper of the national football team and former coach of the Esteghlal football club. After his rejection, Hejazi supported Rafsanjanī as president.
  - Mohammad Hossein Pahlevan, known as Arshia, pop singer
  - Azam Taleghani, daughter of Ayatollah Mahmoud Taleghani.
  - Ebrahim Yazdi, former Minister of Foreign affairs in the Interim Government of 1979, secretary general of Freedom Movement Party. After being rejected by the Guardian Council, Yazdi is supporting Moeen for the presidency.
- Unknown affiliation
  - Ayatollah Mohammad Sajjadi

=== Declinations and withdrawals ===
The most important withdrawal was that of Mohsen Rezaee, one of the candidates who was approved by the Guardian Council and participated in the race until the evening of 15 June 2005, two days before the election and only a few hours before the final deadline allowed for advertisements. Rezaee mentioned he was withdrawing from the race for "the integration of the votes of the nation" and "their effectiveness". He did not endorse any candidate.

Also, several people were considered possible candidates for the post, who later declined to run early in the race or at the final moments before registration. A list of the ones considered seriously in the media includes:

- Reformists
  - Safdar Hosseini, Minister of Economy and Finance Affair, member of IIPF
  - Hadi Khamenei, member of Society of Forces Following the Line of the Imam, declined on 6 December 2004
  - Mohammad Reza Khatami, former Majlis Vice Speaker, Secretary General of IIPF
  - Hassan Khomeini, grandson of Ruhollah Khomeini
  - Mir-Hossein Mousavi, former Prime Minister, declined on 12 October 2004
  - Mohammad Mousavi-Khoiniha, member of MCS, declined on 21 November 2004
  - Behzad Nabavi, former Majlis Vice Speaker, member of MIRO
  - Mohammad Ali Najafi, former Minister of Education
  - Abdollah Ramezanzadeh, Spokesman of Government, member of IIPF
- Conservatives
  - Gholam Ali Haddad-Adel, Speaker of Majlis, he declined his activities for election and said that he will try to re-ally conservatives for election.
  - Abdollah Jasbi, President of Islamic Azad University. Jasbi withdrew in favor of Rafsanjanī.
  - Mohammad Javad Larijani, Director of IPM. He strongly endorses his brother Ali Larijani for presidency.
  - Hossein Mirmohammad-Sadeghi, former speaker of Judiciary Branch
  - Ahmad Tavakkoli, Majlis representative and Director of Majlis Research Center and former presidential candidate. Tavakkoli resigned from the race on 1 May 2005, telling that he is doing this to help minimize the diversity in the conservative camp. He is supporting Ghalibaf in the elections.
  - Ali Akbar Velayati, an Adviser to the Supreme Leader for foreign affairs, and a former Minister of Foreign Affairs. Velayati was supported inside the conservative alliance by Islamic Coalition Party (ICP). Valayati had confirmed that he does not accept the support of the Council for Coordination and will run independently, unless Akbar Rafsanjanī, who was the President of Iran during Velayati's ministership, runs. On 14 May, Velayati did not register to run until the official deadline, and then announced that he is supporting Rafsanjani in the elections.
- Independents
  - Shirin Ebadi, winner of Nobel Peace Prize in 2003, declined on 2 January 2005, despite support among some independent groups and parties, which are usually called pro-Human rights

== Campaign ==
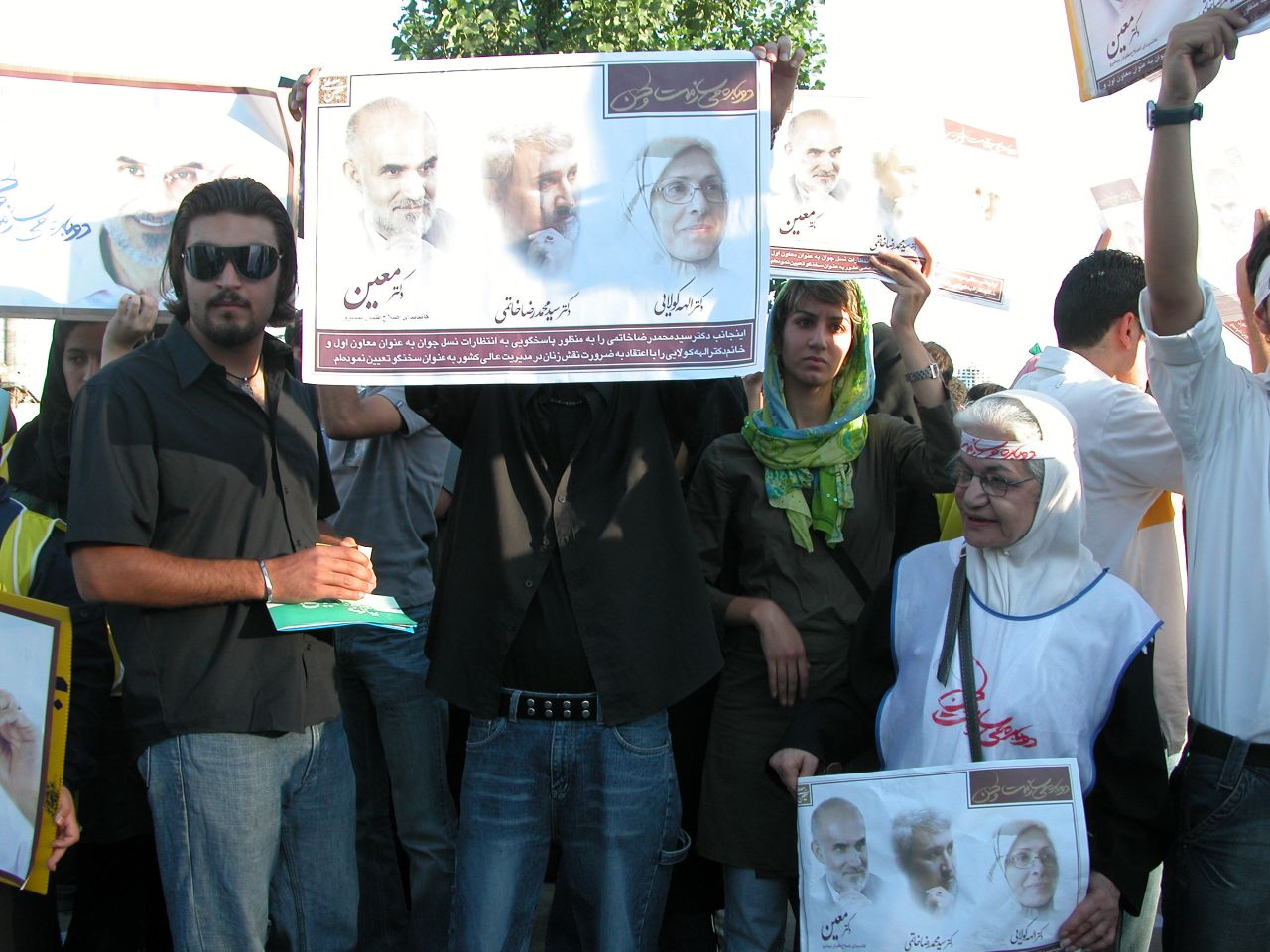
Campaigning in progress

The best financed candidate, Rafsanjani, campaigned with an entourage of bullet-proof Mercedes limousines. While he usually did not emphasize issues in his campaign Rafsanjani did tell voters that "there is no use imposing tastes, being strict, and going backward. ... Whoever becomes president cannot work without considering the demands and conditions of society." He also indicated a liberalizing in his views on proper Islamic dress. Where in 2002 he had said that exposing a single strand of a woman's hair from behind hejab was "a dagger drawn toward the heart of Islam," in 2005 he described his red line as "no nudity," in a campaign meeting with Iranian youth.

Ahmadinejad used mosque networks and his personal ties to the Revolutionary Guards and Basij for his campaign. In TV advertisements he was shown praying and praising veterans of the Iran–Iraq War for their sacrifices. He campaigned in an old 1977 Peugeot 504 car.

Some voters, including exiled citizens belonging to opposition political groups or monarchists (both living outside Iran), some parts of the intellectual community living in Iran, and even a few reformists boycotted the election as a symbol of not supporting the current regime and its practices. The boycotters' reasons included the massive rejection of registered candidates, that they believed that the role of the Iranian president is insignificant in the power structure and overshadowed by those of the supreme leader who is practically elected for life, and that they believed that all the candidates had already helped the regime in the oppression of its political opposition or would do so if elected. The most famous boycott leader was Akbar Ganji, imprisoned in Evin prison for his journalism and in a hunger strike.

While some members of the intellectual community in Iran supported the boycott, some key figures, residing inside Iran or exiled to Europe or North America, had asked their readers and the general population to vote in the election, reasoning that not voting in the election would result in the election of one of the three conservative candidates, who were all military people with a background in Islamic Revolutionary Guard Corps. The most famous supporters of voting in the intellectual community included Ebrahim Nabavi, Masoud Behnoud, and Khashayar Deyhimi. These people were mostly supporting Moeen as their preferred candidate who is considered to be the least aligned with Ayatollah Khamenei, but a few have also talked or written in support of Rafsanjanī or Karroubi. Emadeddin Baghi, the President of the Iranian Association for Supporting Prisoners' Rights and one of the boycotters, has also spoken in support of Rafsanjani and mentioned that while he still considers Rafsanjani a conservative, he prefers his traditional conservatism to Ahmadinejad's fundamentalism.

=== Endorsements ===
First round

Organization	Candidate
Combatant Clergy Association	Akbar Rafsanjanī
Executives of Construction Party	Akbar Rafsanjanī
Moderation and Development Party	Akbar Rafsanjanī
Worker House	Akbar Rafsanjanī
Islamic Labour Party	Akbar Rafsanjanī
Freethinkers' Pinnacle Party	Akbar Rafsanjanī
Islamic Iran Participation Front	Mostafa Moeen
Mojahedin of the Islamic Revolution of Iran Organization	Mostafa Moeen
Freedom Movement of Iran	Mostafa Moeen
Council of Nationalist-Religious Forces	Mostafa Moeen
Islamic Association of Iranian Medical Society	Mostafa Moeen
Islamic Association of Teachers of Iran	Mostafa Moeen
Islamic Association of University Instructors	Mostafa Moeen
Coordination Council of Islamic Revolution Forces	Ali Larijani
Islamic Coalition Party	Ali Larijani
Islamic Society of Engineers	Ali Larijani
Society of Devotees of the Islamic Revolution	Mohammad Bagher Ghalibaf
Front of Transformationalist Principlists	Mohammad Bagher Ghalibaf
Alliance of Builders of Islamic Iran	Mahmoud Ahmadinejad
Association of Islamic Revolution Loyalists	Mahmoud Ahmadinejad
Office for Strengthening Unity – Shiraz faction	Mahmoud Ahmadinejad
Islamic Society of Students	Mahmoud Ahmadinejad
Islamic Iran Solidarity Party	Mehdi Karoubi
Islamic Assembly of Ladies	Mehdi Karoubi
Democracy Party	Mehdi Karoubi
Assembly of the Forces of Imam's Line	Mehdi Karoubi
Association of Combatant Clerics	None
Office for Strengthening Unity – Allameh faction	Boycott

== Opinion polls ==
Islamic Republic News Agency (IRNA) poll conducted in March 2005
Potential candidate	Percentage
Akbar Rafsanjanī	28.2(%)
Mehdi Karoubi	8.8(%)
Ali Akbar Velayati	5.6(%)
Ali Larijani	4.4(%)
Mostafa Moeen	4.1(%)
Ahmad Tavakoli	3.9(%)
Mohsen Rezaee	2.1(%)
Hassan Rouhani	2.1(%)
Mohammad Bagher Ghalibaf	1.9(%)
Mohammad Reza Aref	1.8(%)
Mahmoud Ahmadinejad	1.7(%)

Iranian Students Polling Agency (ISPA), one day before election (23 June 2005)
Candidate	Percentage
Mahmoud Ahmadinejad	45(%)
Akbar Hashemi Rafsanjani	39.7(%)

== Conduct ==
After the first round of the election, some people, including Mehdi Karroubi, the pragmatic reformist candidate who ranked third in the first round but was the first when partial results were first published, have alleged that a network of mosques, the Islamic Revolutionary Guard Corps military forces, and Basij militia forces have been illegally used to generate and mobilize support for Ahmadinejad. Karroubi has explicitly alleged that Mojtaba Khamenei, a son of the Supreme Leader Ayatollah Khamenei, was involved. Ayatollah Khamenei then wrote to Karroubi and mentioned that these allegations are below his dignity and will result in a crisis in Iran, which he will not allow. As a reply, Karroubi resigned from all his political posts, including an Advisor to the Supreme Leader and a member of Expediency Discernment Council, on both of which he had been installed by Khamenei. The day after, on 20 June, a few reformist morning newspapers, Eghbal, Hayat-e No, Aftab-e Yazd, and Etemaad were stopped from distribution by the general prosecutor of Tehran, Saeed Mortazavi, for publishing Karroubi's letter.

Akbar Rafsanjanī, the leading candidate, has also pointed to organized and unjust interventions by "guiding" the votes, and has supported Karroubi's complaint.

A suspicious election result pointed out by Western journalist Christopher de Bellaigue was a 95% voter turnout and first-place result for Ahmadinejad in the province of South Khorasan. This despite that region's large numbers of disgruntled Sunni Muslims, and Ahmadinejad's association with "intrusive Shia Islamism."

Also, some political groups, including the reformist party Islamic Iran Participation Front, have alleged that Ahmadinejad had only ranked second because of the illegal support and advertising activities for him during the voting by the supervisors selected by the Guardian Council, while the supervisors should have remained impartisan according to the election law. Also, the reformist newspaper Shargh has pointed to an announcement by Movahhedi Kermani, the official representative of the supreme leader in Islamic Revolutionary Guards Corps, mentioning "vote for a person who keeps to the minimum in his advertisements and doesn't lavish", which uniquely pointed to Ahmadinejad.

Some of the controversies involve activities of the Guardian Council such as the publishing an opinion poll before the election giving Ahmadinejad front-runner status. It also announced the partial results of the election on the day after the election, putting Ahmadinejad on the second rank while he was still in the third rank in the partial statistics published by the Ministry of Interior, which led to President Khatami going to the Ministry several times and explicitly asking the council to not announce any more partial results.

== Results ==
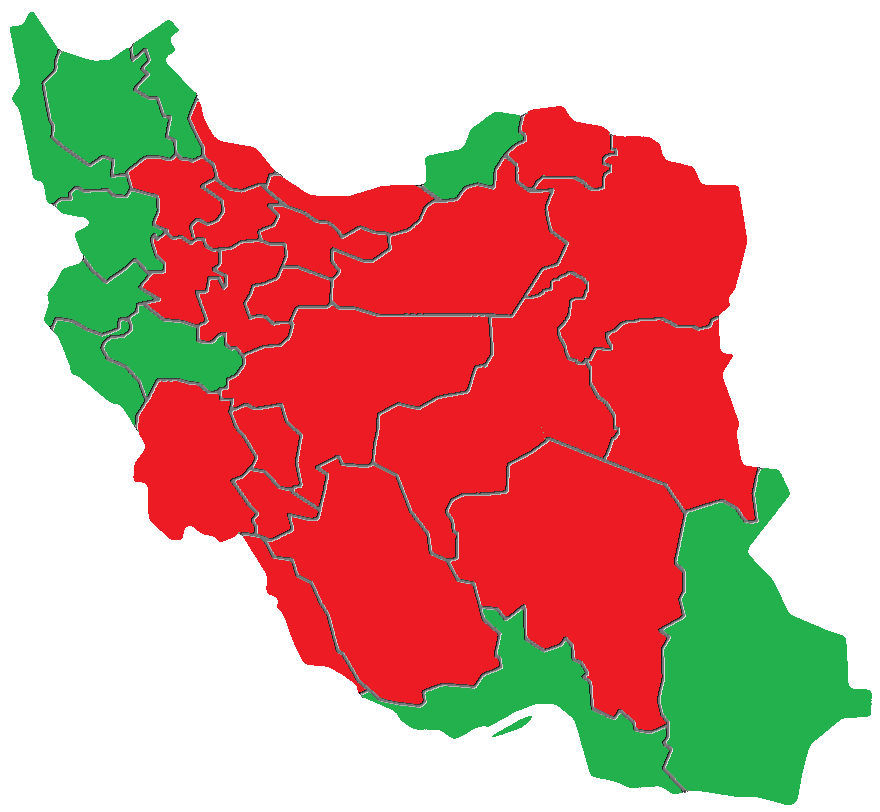
Shows in which provinces the reformists (green) and in which provinces the conservatives (red) won a majority in the first round.

The Islamic Republic government of Iran, especially the Supreme Leader and the higher offices, publicly considers the turnout of the voters, which was about 64% in the first round, to resemble the support of the population for the regime, while some voters consider voting for the candidates less aligned with the supreme leader as a vote against the current practices of the regime. Comparative to other elections, there does not seem to be any major drop in number of votes caused by boycott. The turnout in the previous election, i.e. Khatami's second term, was at 67%.

The first round of the election was a very close race with minor differences in the number of votes won by each candidate which led to a run-off a week later with Ahmadinejad and ex-president Akbar Hashemi Rafsanjani participating. There were seven people running for the post out of more than a thousand initial candidates, most of whom were disqualified by the Guardian Council, which is responsible for vetting by constitution for election. Rafsanjani, who had been regarded as the front-runner and had positioned himself as a centrist, was defeated by Ahmadinejad in the run-off, while reformist candidate Mostafa Moeen fared poorly and finished only fifth in the first round.

After the results of the first round, many of the supporters of the boycott supported Rafsanjani, and many of the supporters of the reformist candidates, including many supporters of Moeen, are doing the same. Islamic Iran Participation Front (IIPF) and Mojahedin of the Islamic Revolution Organization (MIRO), as the two main parties who supported Moeen, are included, with IIPF asking for "uniting against the rise of religious fascism" and MIRO telling about the rival "Führer-istic mindset". Moeen himself has mentioned that he will not personally vote in the second round, but that his supporters "should take the danger of fascism seriously" and should not think about a boycott in the second round.

This was the first presidential runoff in the history of Iran. Before the run-off took place, it was compared to the 2002 French presidential election, where the splintering of the left-wing vote similarly led to a run-off between the moderate Jacques Chirac and the far-right Jean-Marie Le Pen. The comparison was made because of the unexpected votes in favor of Ahmadinejad, the very close race, and the comparability of the political standings of Rafsanjani and Ahmadinejad to those of Chirac and Le Pen. But after the results for the run-off were made public, the comparison was considered void due to the loss of the moderate candidate Rafsanjani, although Ahmadinejad's opponents formed an alliance against him.

Candidate	First round		Second round	
Candidate	Votes	%	Votes	%
Akbar Rafsanjanī	6,179,653	22.00	10,046,701	36.76
Mahmoud Ahmadinejad	5,710,354	20.33	17,284,782	63.24
Mehdi Karroubi	5,056,686	18.00		
Mohammad Bagher Ghalibaf	4,075,189	14.50		
Mostafa Moeen	4,069,699	14.49		
Ali Larijani	1,716,081	6.11		
Mohsen Mehralizadeh	1,287,440	4.58		
Total	28,095,102	100.00	27,331,483	100.00
Valid votes	28,095,102	95.83	27,331,483	97.63
Invalid/blank votes	1,221,937	4.17	663,770	2.37
Total votes	29,317,039	100.00	27,995,253	100.00
Registered voters/turnout	46,786,418	62.66	46,786,418	59.84
Source: IFES, IFES

=== First round results by province ===
Province	Ahmadinejad	Karroubi	Larijani	Mehralizadeh	Moeen	Ghalibaf	Rafsanjanī	Total votes
Ardabil	34,090	53,906	7,766	111,465	67,134	106,272	95,490	476,123
Azarbaijan, East	198,417	121,969	28,075	378,604	190,211	122,160	268,954	1,308,390
Azarbaijan, West	75,319	99,766	15,435	163,091	146,941	141,289	151,525	793,336
Bushehr	82,376	98,148	8,207	4,942	68,547	46,962	97,412	406,594
Chahar Mahaal and Bakhtiar	90,960	75,044	23,127	5,051	48,356	64,068	59,521	366,128
Fars	242,535	546,633	61,383	22,440	217,122	273,542	403,074	1,766,729
Gilan	149,026	203,941	50,070	33,996	182,321	171,562	215,478	1,006,394
Golestan	56,776	193,570	42,334	8,283	156,862	87,522	155,498	700,845
Hamadan	195,030	218,018	24,002	20,496	84,424	72,986	175,997	790,953
Hormozgan	80,154	177,413	78,161	9,679	153,648	25,326	75,601	599,982
Ilam	32,383	108,627	6,783	3,026	56,526	41,082	40,580	289,007
Isfahan	801,635	196,512	73,452	30,325	196,261	198,409	260,858	1,757,452
Kerman	129,284	152,764	221,219	9,697	52,896	112,056	480,271	1,158,187
Kermanshah	70,117	254,780	22,033	12,516	106,804	115,439	137,010	718,699
Khorasan, North	22,954	89,551	16,900	8,209	37,330	100,091	70,407	345,442
Khorasan, Razavi	377,732	297,967	78,976	33,488	325,281	877,665	527,707	2,518,816
Khorasan, South	101,638	27,705	5,716	4,958	39,276	49,043	57,244	285,580
Khuzestan	232,874	538,735	58,564	20,164	148,529	148,234	319,921	1,467,021
Kohgiluyeh and Boyer-Ahmad	34,396	96,459	20,306	1,572	50,954	52,259	56,154	312,100
Kurdistan	22,353	111,249	7,785	10,261	92,884	48,913	54,004	347,449
Lorestan	69,710	440,247	31,169	6,865	53,747	70,225	121,130	793,093
Markazi	161,669	104,522	17,258	14,058	65,592	71,828	143,118	578,045
Mazandaran	159,291	103,229	464,891	18,467	148,408	116,763	311,949	1,322,998
Qazvin	118,414	81,569	18,078	24,649	68,366	77,399	108,928	497,403
Qom	256,110	25,282	10,894	14,451	27,824	25,792	104,004	464,357
Semnan	98,024	25,899	20,190	3,873	26,572	37,059	69,773	281,390
Sistan and Baluchestan	47,743	77,017	24,954	7,312	479,125	68,605	155,147	859,903
Tehran	1,500,829	415,187	246,167	281,748	648,598	614,381	1,274,276	4,981,186
Yazd	175,206	58,132	9,317	5,186	60,510	66,892	77,924	453,167
Zanjan	93,309	62,845	22,869	18,568	68,649	71,365	110,698	448,303
Total	5,710,354	5,056,686	1,716,081	1,287,440	4,069,698	4,075,189	6,179,653	28,095,072
Source: Iran Data Portal
