= Front for Democracy and Human Rights =

- Founder: Mostafa Moin
- Founded: June 2005

The Front for Democracy and Human Rights (Persian: جبهه دموکراسی‌خواهی و حقوق بشر) was an alliance founded by Mostafa Moin in 2005, as the main theme for his presidential campaign during 2005 election. Moin referred the alliance's aim as "to defend the rights of all Iran’s religious and ethnic groups, the youth, academicians, women and political opposition groups whose rights are often neglected."

The Council of Nationalist-Religious Activists of Iran and Freedom Movement of Iran joined the alliance, along with the reformers.

Hussein-Ali Montazeri backed the front.
