= Iranian reformists =

Islamic liberal political faction in Iran

Reformists
- Spiritual leader: Mohammad Khatami
- Parliamentary wing: Hope fraction (since 2016); Imam's line fraction (2004–2012); 2nd of Khordad fraction (2000–2004); Hezbollah Assembly (1996–2000)
- Ideology: Reformism; Republicanism; Liberalism (Iranian); Islamic liberalism Islamic democracy Anti-Zionism; Factions: Populism; Moderate conservatism Islamic socialism Pragmatism; Third Way
- Political position: Centre to centre-left Factions: Centre-right or left-wing
- Religion: Shia Islam and a minority of Sunni Islam

Executive branch
- President: Yes
- Ministers: 7 / 19 (37%)
- Vice Presidents: 7 / 14 (50%)

Parliament
- Speaker: No
- Seats: 43 / 290 (15%)

Judicial branch
- Chief Justice: No
- Status: No influence

Oversight bodies
- Assembly of Experts: 1 / 88 (1%)
- Guardian Council: 0 / 12 (0%)
- Expediency Council: 7 / 48 (15%)

City Councils
- Tehran: 0 / 21 (0%)
- Mashhad: 0 / 15 (0%)
- Isfahan: 0 / 13 (0%)
- Karaj: 0 / 13 (0%)
- Qom: 8 / 13 (62%)
- Shiraz: 3 / 13 (23%)
- Tabriz: 5 / 13 (38%)
- Yazd: 7 / 11 (64%)
- Zahedan: 11 / 11 (100%)
- Rasht: 8 / 9 (89%)
- Sanandaj: 2 / 9 (22%)
- Politics of Iran; Political parties; Elections; A: Despite Reformists having a politically moderate view, Reformists are considered "left-wing", "progressive", "progressive Islamist" "Islamic left", "liberal" or "left-liberal" in contrast to right-wing conservative Principlists.

The Reformists (Persian: اصلاح‌طلبان, romanized: Eslâh-Talabân) are an Islamic liberal political faction in Iran. Iran's "reform era" is sometimes said to have lasted from 1997 to 2005—the length of President Mohammad Khatami's two terms in office. The Council for Coordinating the Reforms Front is the main umbrella organization and coalition within the movement; however, there are reformist groups not aligned with the council, such as the Reformists Front. Masoud Pezeshkian, a reformist, was elected president following the 2024 Iranian presidential election, and was subsequently confirmed by Supreme Leader Ali Khamenei on 28 July.

== Background ==
=== Organizations ===
The 2nd of Khordad Movement usually refers not only to the coalition of 18 groups and political parties of the reforms front but to anyone else who was a supporter of the 1997 reform programs of Khatami.

The reforms front consists of several political parties, some of the most famous including the following:

- Islamic Iran Participation Front: key figures are Mohammad Reza Khatami, Saeed Hajjarian, Alireza Alavitabar, Abbas Abdi, Mohsen Safaie-Farahani, Mohsen Aminzadeh, and Mostafa Tajzadeh. It has been described as the dominant member within the 2nd of Khordad Front, the "main reformist party", and the party most closely associated with President Khatami.
- Association of Combatant Clerics (Majma'e Rowhaniyoon-e Mobarez): key figures are Mohammad Khatami, Hadi Khamenei, Majid Ansari, Mohammad Tavassoli, and Mohammad Mousavi Khoeiniha. It has been described as the "main 'reformist' clerical body".
- Mojahedin of the Islamic Revolution of Iran Organization (Sāzmān-e Mojāhedin-e Enqelāb-e Eslāmi-e Irān): key figures are Behzad Nabavi, Mohsen Armin, Mohammad Salevati, and Feyzollah Arabsorkhi. The mojahedin have been called a "key political group".

=== Ideas ===
Many reformists support Islamic liberalism and progressive Islamist agenda. Some Iranian intellectuals were involved in establishing a foundation for the movement. Perhaps the most influential figure was Abdolkarim Soroush. For many years, he was the only voice publicly criticizing the regime's policies. His regular lectures at Tehran University used to enjoy the attendance of many of the Iranian students who later generated the 2nd of Khordad movement. Many famous figures of the movement belong to the Soroush circle. However, at the rise of 2nd of Khordad movement, Saeed Hajjarian acted as the main theorist behind the movement and the main strategist in Khatami's camp. According to Mahmoud Sadeghi, the dominant [economic] tendency of reformists is social democracy.

The movement has been described as changing the key terms in public discourse: emperialism (imperialism), mostazafen (poor), jehad (jihad), mojahed (mujahideen), shahed (martyrdom), khish (roots), enqelab (revolution) and Gharbzadegi (Western intoxication), to some modern terms and concepts like: demokrasi (democracy), moderniyat (modernity), azadi (liberty), barabari (equality), jam'eh-e madani (civil society), hoquq-e beshar (human rights), mosharekat-e siyasi (political participation), Shahrvandi (citizenship), etc.

=== Supporters ===
The core of the reform movement is said to be made up of Islamic leftists disqualified from running for office as they were purged and generally disempowered by Islamic conservatives following the death of Imam Khomeini in 1989. Islamic leftists turned reformists include Abdolkarim Soroush, Saeed Hajjarian, Akbar Ganji, Ali Akbar Mohtashami-Pur, Ebrahim Asgharzadeh, Mohsen Mirdamadi, Mir-Hossein Mousavi, and the Anjoman-e-Eslami (Islamic Association) and Office for Strengthening Unity student groups.

Many institutions support the movement of reformation such as organizations like Organization of the Mojahedin of the Islamic Revolution (OMIR) and the Majma’a Rohaneeyoon Mobarez or the Forum of the Militant Clergy, or Office for Fostering Unity and Freedom Movement of Iran. There were also many media outlets in support like the Iran-e-farda and kian magazinez.

Khatami's support is said to have cut across regions and class lines with even some members of the Islamic Revolutionary Guard Corps, Qom seminarians and Basij members voting for him. The core of his electoral support, however, came from the modern middle class, college students, women, and urban workers. For example, by 1995, about half of Iran's 60.5 million people were too young to be alive at the time of the Islamic Revolution.

== Major events ==
=== 1997 presidential election ===
The movement began with the May 23, 1997, surprise victory of Mohammad Khatami, "a little known cleric", to the presidency on with almost 70% of the vote.

Khatami is regarded as Iran's first reformist president, since the focus of his campaign was on the rule of law, democracy and the inclusion of all Iranians in the political decision-making process.

=== Assassination attempt on Saeed Hajjarian ===
Very soon after the rise of the 2nd of Khordad movement, there was an attempted assassination of Saeed Hajjarian, the main strategist of the reformist camp. In March 2000, he was shot in the face on the doorstep of Tehran's city council by a gunman who fled on a motorcycle with an accomplice. The bullet entered through his left cheek and lodged in his neck. He was not killed but was "badly paralyzed" for some time. During his coma, groups of young Iranians kept a vigil outside Sina hospital, where he was being treated. Due to this injury, Hajjarian now uses a walking frame, and his voice is distorted.

His convicted assailant Saeed Asgar, a young man who was reported to be a member of the Basij militia, served only a small part of his 15-year jail sentence.

=== Ganji and Red Eminence and Grey Eminences ===
Red Eminence and Grey Eminences (Persian: عالیجناب سرخپوش و عالیجنابان خاکستری "Alijenabe Sorkhpoosh, Alijenabane Khakestari") is the name of a series of newspaper articles and a book written by Akbar Ganji under the responsibility of Saeed Hajjarian, in which he criticized former president Akbar Rafsanjani as the "Red Eminence" and the intelligence officers in his government, such as Ali Fallahian, as the "Grey Eminences". His subsequent prosecution and conviction for "anti-Islamic activities" for his role in the publication of the book and articles cost Akbar Ganji six years of imprisonment.

=== 1999 local elections ===
Reformist candidates did remarkably well in the 1999 local elections and received 75% of the vote.

=== 18th of Tir crisis (1999) ===
The 18th of Tir (July 9) crisis, refers to a demonstration in Tehran University dormitory in reaction to closing Salam newspaper by the government. Demonstrations continued for a few days in most cities in Iran and in more than ninety-five countries worldwide. The demonstration ended in violence and the death of a young Iranian citizen along with many casualties. At the time, it was Iran's biggest antigovernment demonstrations since the 1979 Islamic revolution. After attacking of the students of Tehran University by hardline vigilante group, Khatami delivered a speech three months later while defending of his reform programme and at the same time he insisted on the foundations of his government. He referred to the reformation of system from within with holding two elements of Islamic and republic.

=== 18th of Tir national day of protest (2003) ===
In 2003, Iran's leading pro-democracy student group, the Daftar-e Tahkim-e-Vahdat called for a national day of protest on the 18th of Tir to commemorate the original 1999 protest. At least one observer believes it was the failure of this protest that "delivered a fatal blow to the reform movement."

According to journalist Afshin Molavi, many Iranians hoped the day would lead to an uprising that would "break the back" of the hardliners, but instead the Islamic Republic "employed violence, intimidation, and sophisticated carrot-and-stick approach to suck the wind out of the demonstrations." In addition to a show of force and numerous checkpoints, the state used sophisticated jamming technology to block satellite TV feeds and allowed the holding of (rare) outdoor pop concerts to draw young people away from the demonstrations. Dartar-e Tahkim-e-Vahdat also hurt its cause by calling for foreigners, specifically the UN - to assist it against the government.

=== 6th Parliament (2000) ===
In the Iranian parliamentary elections, 2000 to elect the 6th parliament, reformist enjoyed a majority (69.25%), or 26.8 million, of the 38.7 million voters who cast ballots in the February 18, 2000 first round. Ultimately reformists won 195 of the 290 Majlis seats in that election.

=== 7th Parliament (2004) ===
In January 2004, shortly before the 2004 Iranian legislative elections (the 7th Parliament), the conservative Council of Guardians ended Iranian voters' continued support for reformists by banning about 2500 candidates, nearly half of the total, including 80 sitting Parliament deputies. More than 100 MPs resigned in protest and critics complained the move "shattered any pretense of Iranian democracy".

=== 27 Khordad presidential election (2005) ===
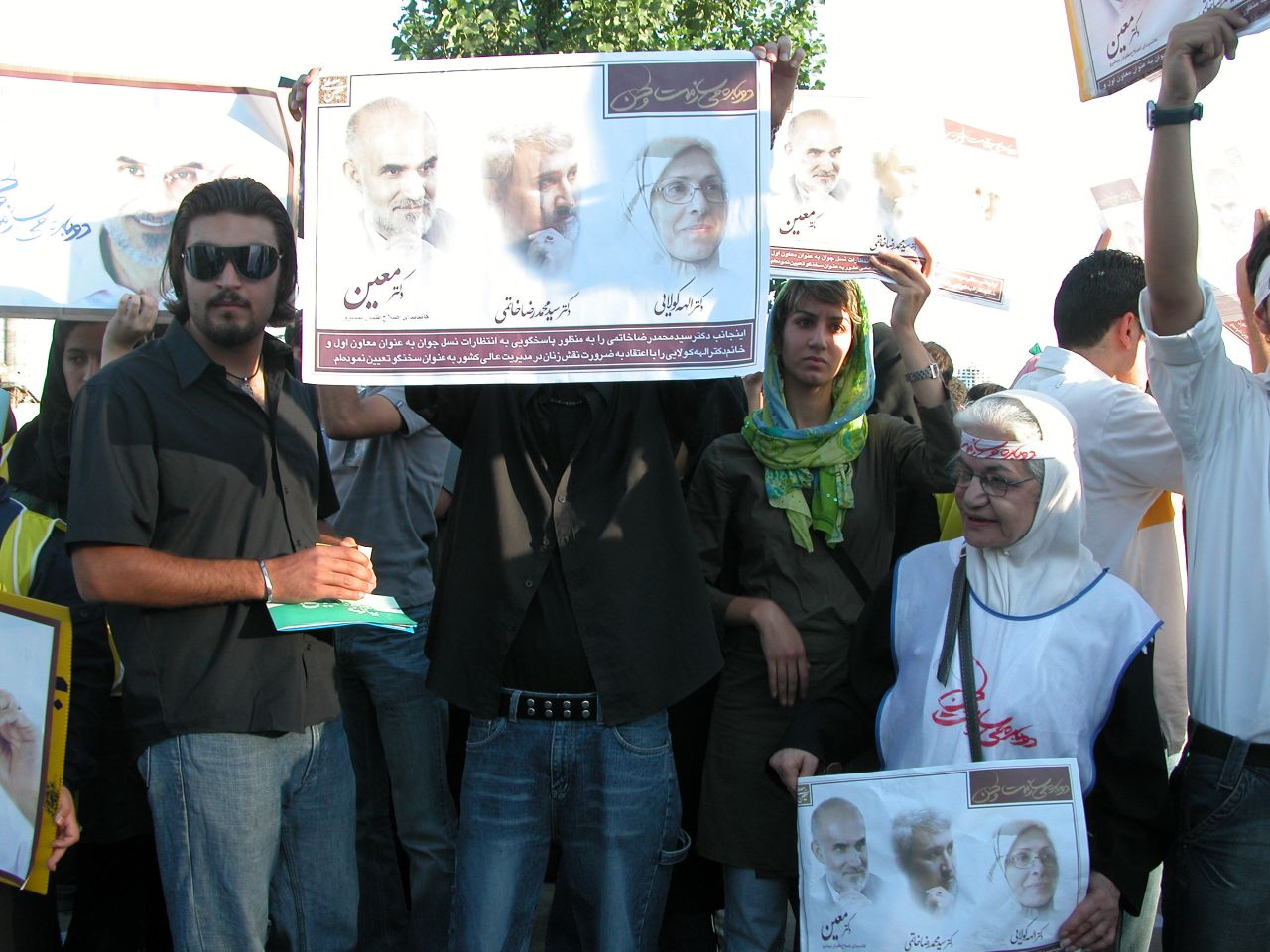
A rally supporting Mostafa Moeen, a reformist candidate in the 2005 elections

In the 27 Khordad presidential election (June 17, 2005), Mostafa Moin and Mehdi Karroubi were the main candidates of the 2nd of Khordad movement. However, neither made it to the second round of the election (the final runoff): Moin came in fifth and Karroubi third in the first round. As a result, many supporters of the reform movement lost hope and did not participate in the election.

=== 2009 Iranian presidential election ===
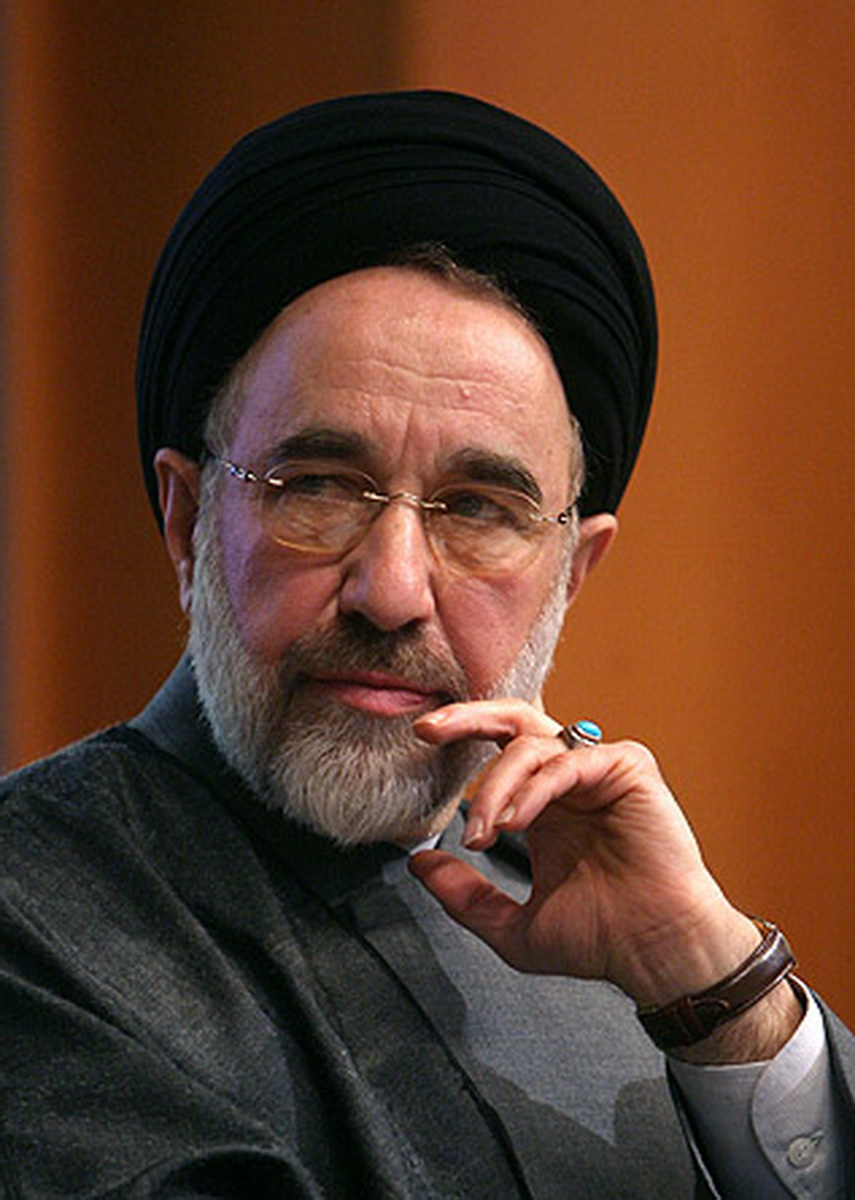
Mohammad Khatami

The two leading reformist candidates in the 2009 presidential election were Mir-Hossein Mousavi and Mehdi Karroubi. Mousavi supporters disbelieved the election results and initiated a series of protests that lasted several days. After many days of protesting against the election results, the protests eventually turned violent as the Basij (loyal militia to the Islamic Republic) started attacking the protesters and vice versa. Some protesters turned their anger to the government itself and tried to overthrow the Islamic Republic. The protests, in general, lasted up to several months.

=== 2024 Iranian presidential election ===
Masoud Pezeshkian was elected in a snap election after the death of Iranian President Ebrahim Raisi, who died in a helicopter crash on 19 May 2024. He secured nearly 16.4 million of the more than 30 million votes cast, beating his main rival Saeed Jalili, who received approximately 13.5 million in a run-off election, according to the official count. The election was generally seen as an upset victory for the Reformists' faction with many political observers expecting low voter turnout. Pezeshkian is described as a centrist, in stark contrast to his predecessor, Raisi, who was described as a "hard-liner". He has promised several economic, political, and cultural reforms; however, several obstacles remained in the way, primarily Iran's supreme leader, Ayatollah Ali Khamenei, who retained decision-making authority on all major state issues prior to his death in 2026.

== Obstacles to the Movement ==
The Reformists' Party often struggles with realizing its agenda as described by The Economist magazine:

Dozens of newspapers opened during the Khatami period, only for many to be shut down on one pretext or another by the judiciary. Clerics who took advantage of the new atmosphere to question the doctrine of velayat-e faqih [Islamic government] were imprisoned or otherwise cowed. Even as political debate blossomed, Iran's security services cracked down on religious and ethnic minorities. A number of the government's critics fell victim to murders traced later to the interior ministry. In 1999, police reacted to a peaceful demonstration for freer speech by invading Tehran University, beating and arresting hundreds of students and killing at least one. In the Majlis (parliament) much of the president's reforming legislation was vetoed by the Council of Guardians, a committee of clerics appointed by the supreme leader to ensure that laws conform with Islamic precepts.

Saeed Hajjarian, the main theorist behind the movement, declared in 2003 that "the reform movement is dead. Long live the reform movement".

The victory of conservatives in the 2005 presidential election and the 2004 Majlis election can be explained "not so much" by an expansion of "their limited core base as by [their] dividing of the reformers and [their] discouraging them from voting," according to political historian Ervand Abrahamian:

The conservatives won in part because they retained their 25% base; in part because they recruited war veterans to run as their candidates; in part because they wooed independents on the issue of national security; but in most part because large numbers of women, college students, and other members of the salaried middle class stayed home. Turnout in the Majles elections fell below 51% - one of the worst since the revolution. In Tehran, it fell to 28%.

=== Limitations ===
The reform movement has been lamented as "too divided to establish its own political authority, too naïve about the tenacity of the authoritarian elite around Khamenei, and too inflexible to circumvent the ban on political parties in Iran by creating and sustaining alternative forms of mobilisation." In addition, leaders of the reform movement lacked a clear and coherent strategy of establishing durable and extensive linkages with the public.

Ironically, they became a victim of their electoral successes. The reform movement's "control of both the presidency and parliament from 2000 to 2004 made it look inept and a part of the corrupt system in the eyes of many Iranians."

=== Secularism ===
BBC journalist Jonathan Beale reports that since secularism is banned in Iran, it is an ideology that is mostly followed by political organizations among the Iranian diaspora or by many of the anti-sharia political parties in exile that are secular. These parties promote regime change, most often with foreign aid and military intervention (particularity from the United States). He quotes a former leader of the Iranian Revolutionary Guards, Mohsen Sazegara (also one of its founders), as saying, "Don't interfere. Leave these affairs to the Iranian people". Sazegara believes the US should call for democracy and freedom, and let Iranian opposition groups inside Iran, which are Reformists, take the lead, instead of attempting to create an opposition in exile.

==== Referendum movement ====
The Referendum movement calls in effect for a return of the 1979 referendum that established the Islamic Republic in Iran: "a 'yes or no' vote on whether today's Iranians still want the authoritarian Islamic Republic that another generation's revolution brought them." It is said to have been born out of "the ashes of the failures of Khatami's Islamic democracy movement" and reflected in one-word graffiti on walls in Tehran saying "no". It has been criticized as calling for complete system change without "building the political and organisational network to back it up" and inviting a brutal crackdown, with "no means on the ground to resist it".

== Election results ==
=== President ===
President of Iran
Date	Candidate Supported	%	Votes	Rank	Notes
1997	Mohammad Khatami	69.6	20,078,187	1st	Supported by Combatant Clerics and Executives
2001	Mohammad Khatami	77.1	21,659,053	1st	Supported by Participation Front, Mojahedin, Combatant Clerics and Executives
2005/1	Akbar Hashemi Rafsanjani	21.13	6,211,937	1st	Supported by Executives
2005/1	Mehdi Karroubi	17.24	5,070,114	3rd	Supported by Combatant Clerics
2005/1	Mostafa Moeen	13.89	4,083,951	5th	Supported by Participation Front and Mojahedin
2005/1	Mohsen Mehralizadeh	4.38	1,288,640	7th	No major party support
2005/2	Akbar Hashemi Rafsanjani	35.93	10,046,701	2nd	
2009	Mir-Hossein Mousavi	33.75	13,338,121	2nd	Supported by Participation Front, Mojahedin, Executives and Combatant Clerics
2009	Mehdi Karroubi	0.85	333,635	4th	National Trust Party Candidate
2013	Hassan Rouhani	50.88	18,692,500	1st	endorsed by Council for coordinating the Reforms Front
2017	Hassan Rouhani	57.13	23,549,616	1st	Unanimous reformist support
2021	Abdolnaser Hemmati	9.81	2,443,387	3rd	Executives Candidate
2024/1	Masoud Pezeshkian	44.40	10,415,991	1st	Supported by Moderation and Development Party, National Trust Party, CRWP
2024/2	Masoud Pezeshkian	54.76	16,384,403	1st	

=== Presidential ===
Election	Candidate	%	Rank	Party
1997	Mohammad Khatami	69.07	1st	ACC
2001	Mohammad Khatami	78.28	1st	ACC
2005	Akbar Hashemi Rafsanjani	35.93	2nd	ECP
2009	Mir-Hossein Mousavi	33.75	2nd	GPH
2013	Hassan Rouhani	50.88	1st	MDP
2017	Hassan Rouhani	57.13	1st	MDP
2021	Abdolnaser Hemmati	9.81	3rd	ECP
2024	Masoud Pezeshkian	54.76	1st	IND

=== Parliament ===
Election	Seats	±	%	Rank	Position/Gov.
2000	222 / 290	▲97	76.55%	▲1st	Majority
2004	47 / 290	▼175	16.20%	▼2nd	Minority
2008	51 / 290	▲4	17.58%	2nd	Opposition
2012	22 / 290	▼29	7.58%	▼3rd	Opposition
2016	132 / 290	▲110	45.51%	▲1st	Minority
2020	31 / 290	▼101	10.68%	▼3rd	Opposition
2024	47 / 290	▲16	16.20%	▲2nd	Minority

=== Assembly of Experts ===
Election	Seats	+/−	%	Rank	Alliance
1998	32 / 86	▲32	37.20%	▲2nd	ECP
2006	29 / 88	▼3	32.95%	2nd	NTP
2016	55 / 88	▲26	62.50%	▲1st	PE
2024	1 / 88	▼54	1.13%	▼3rd	IND

=== Local councils ===
Election	Seats	+/−	%
1999	579 / 815	▲579	71.04%
2003	No data exists		
2006	605 / 1,524	▲26	39.69%
2013	88 / 479	▼517	18.37%
2017	165 / 320	▲77	51.56%
2021	No data exists		

== Coalition organizations ==
=== Reformists' Supreme Council for Policymaking ===
On 8 November 2015, the establishment of the council was announced. It oversees the Council for Coordinating the Reforms Front, which its rotating head serves as the deputy head of the council for policymaking. Moderation and Development Party joined the council in April 2017. Some members of the council include:

- Mohammad-Reza Aref (Head)
- Abdolvahed Mousavi Lari (Deputy)
- Mahmoud Sadeghi (ex-officio deputy as head of the Coordinating Council)
- Elaheh Koulaei (Secretary)
- Elham Fakhari (Secretary)
- Hassan Rasouli
- Mohsen Rohami
- Seyed Mahmoud Mirlohi
- Ali Soufi

== Parliamentary leaders ==
#	Name	Tenure		Fraction	Ref
#	Name	From	To	Fraction	Ref
1	Abdollah Nouri	1996	1997	Hezbollah Assembly	
2	Majid Ansari	1997	2000	Hezbollah Assembly	
3	Ali Akbar Mohtashamipur	2000	2004	2nd of Khordad	
4	Hossein Hashemian	2004	2008	Imam's Line	
5	Mohammad Reza Tabesh	2008	2012	Imam's Line	
No reformist parliamentary group between 2012 and 2016
6	Mohammad Reza Aref	2016	2020	Hope	
No reformist parliamentary group between 2020 and 2024

== Parties ==
- Assembly of the Forces of Imam's Line
- Association of Combatant Clerics
- Democracy Party
- Executives of Construction Party
- Islamic Iran Solidarity Party
- Islamic Labour Party
- National Trust Party
- NEDA Party
- Popular Party of Reforms
- Union of Islamic Iran People Party
- Will of the Iranian Nation Party
- Association of the Women of the Islamic Republic
- Islamic Assembly of Ladies
- Islamic Iran Participation Front (banned)

== Organizations ==
- Assembly of Qom Seminary Scholars and Researchers
- Islamic Association of Teachers
- Islamic Association of Engineers
- Islamic Association of University Instructors
- Islamic Association of Iranian Medical Society
- Office for Strengthening Unity
- Worker House
- Mojahedin of the Islamic Revolution of Iran Organization (banned)

== Media ==
- Aftab Yazd
- Etemaad
- Shargh
- Asr-e Maa
- Asrar
- Ayande-ye No
- Bahar
- Ebtekar
- Ham-Mihan
- Hayat-e-No
- Hambastegi
- Khordad
- Yas-e No
- Zan
- Mosharekat

== See also ==
- Human rights in Iran
- History of principle-ism in Iran
- Chain murders of Iran
- Liberalism in Iran
- Iranian Economic Reform Plan
- Iranian pragmatists
- Iranian principlists
- List of major liberal parties considered left
- Shia opposition to the Islamic Republic of Iran
