= Mohammad Reza Tabesh =

Iranian politician (born 1956)

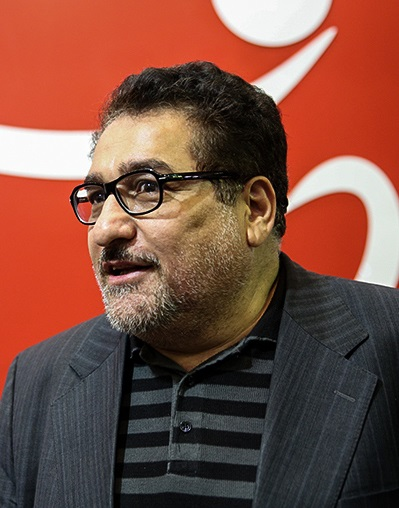

Member of Parliament of Iran
- In office 28 May 2000 – 26 May 2020
- Constituency: Ardakan
- Majority: 25,945 (65.12%)

Personal details
- Born: 26 September 1956 (age 70) Ardakan, Yazd, Iran
- Party: Islamic Iran Participation Front
- Other political affiliations: List of Hope (2016)
- Spouse: Batoul Sanaei (–2008, her death)
- Children: 4
- Relatives: Mohammad Khatami (uncle); Mohammad Reza Khatami (uncle); Ali Khatami (uncle); Ruhollah Khatami (grand-father)
- Education: University of Tehran; IAU, Science and Research Branch
- Website: Official website

Mohammad Reza Tabesh (Persian: محمدرضا تابش, born 26 September 1956) is an Iranian reformist politician who was a member of the Parliament of Iran representing Ardakan electoral district. He was first elected as a parliament member in the 2000 election and was reelected for next four terms.

On 15 June 2012, Tabesh was elected as head of Parliament's fraction on environment, while holding office as parliamentary leader of reformists' "Imam's line fraction" from 2004 to 2012, when the fraction was dissolved.

He is nephew of former Iranian president Mohammad Khatami.

He is also a sport director, holding office as the president of Iran's Equitation Federation from 2003 until 2011.

Assembly seats
Preceded by Hossein Hashemian	Parliamentary leader of reformists Head of Imam's line fraction 2008–2012	Vacant Title next held by Mohammad Reza Aref as Head of "Hope fraction"
Other offices
Unknown	President of the Iranian Equitation Federation; 2003– 5 September 2011	Succeeded by Mahmoud Heydari
