= Hayat-e-No =

Iranian daily newspaper (2000–2009)

- Type: Daily newspaper
- Publisher: Hadi Khamenei
- Founded: 2000
- Ceased publication: 7 December 2009
- Political alignment: Reformism (Iranian)
- Language: Persian
- Headquarters: Tehran
- Country: Iran

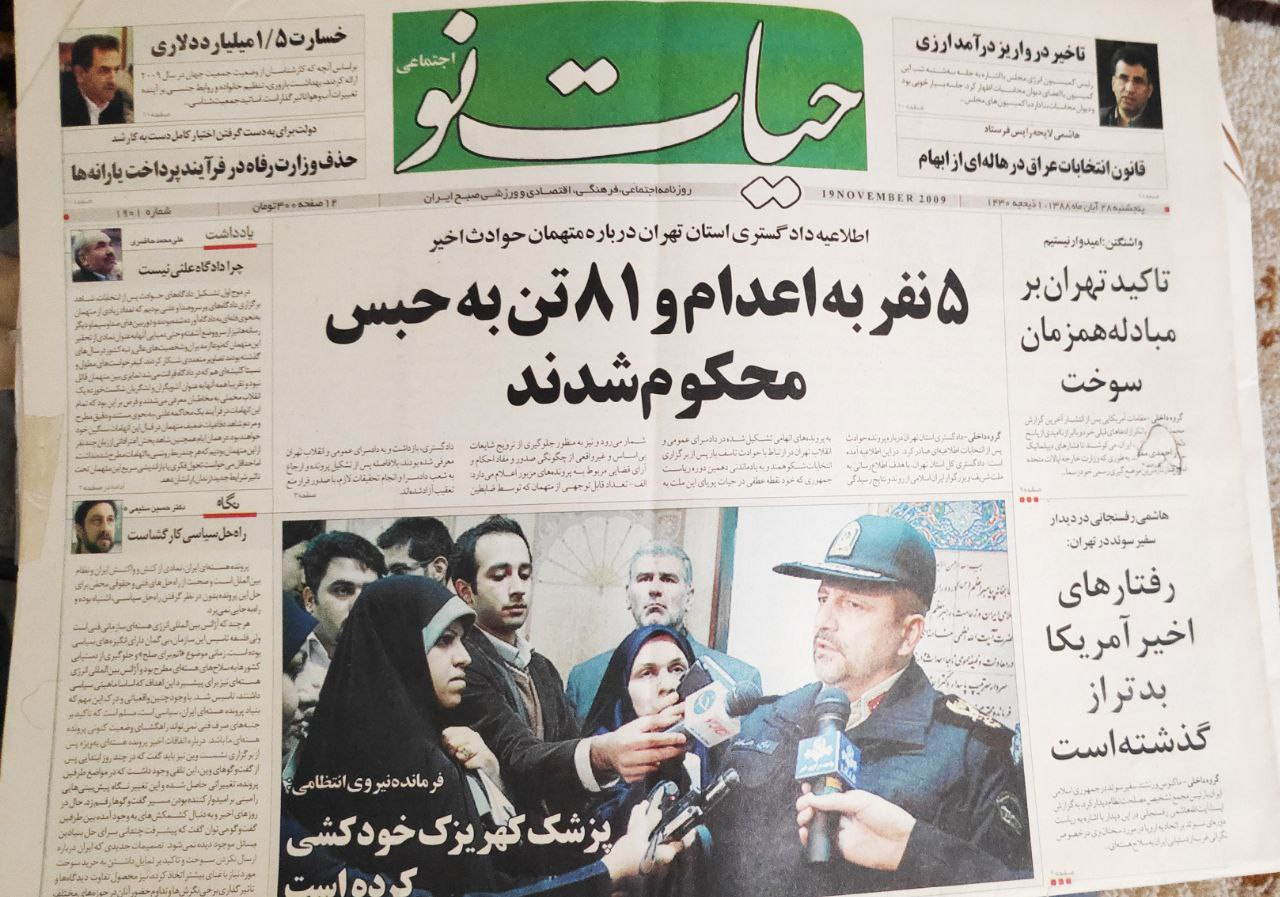
Front cover of the 19 February 2009 edition

Hayat-e-No (Persian: حیات نو, lit. 'New Life') was a reformist newspaper published in Tehran, Iran. The paper was in circulation from 2000 to December 2009 when it was closed by the Iranian authorities.

== History and profile ==
Hayat-e-No was established in 2000 in Tehran following the closure of another reformist paper, Azad. The publisher of Hayat-e-No was Hadi Khamenei, brother of the Supreme Leader of Iran Ali Khamenei. Hameed Qazwini was the editor-in-chief of the paper. When Bahar, a reformist daily, was banned in August 2000 Hayat-e-No became one of the most significant media outlets for the reformist groups in the country. During this period Hayat-e-No sold 300,000 copies.

In June 2005, before the presidential election, the paper along with other reformist papers, including Aftab Yazd and Eqbal, published the letter of presidential candidate Mahdi Karroubi to Ali Khamenei. Upon this publication the papers were banned for one day by Tehran Public and Revolutionary Court.

Hayat-e-No supported Mir Hossein Mousavi in the 2009 presidential elections held in June. In the immediate aftermath of the elections the paper was censored by the Iranian government. In December 2009 the license of the paper was revoked by the Press Supervisory Board "for working outside the regulations" and on 7 December it was closed down.

Hayat-e-No and four other publications, namely Etemad Melli, Sarmaye, Arman and Farhang-e Ashti, were all close to the Green Movement and shut down by the Media Supervisory Board in the same period.
