= Vahedi =

Vahedi is a surname. Notable people with the surname include:

- Alireza Vahedi Nikbakht (born 1980), Iranian footballer and coach
- Amir Vahedi (1961–2010), Iranian poker player
- Mojtaba Vahedi (born 1964), Iranian politician and activist
- Soheil Vahedi (born 1989), Iranian snooker player
