= Eqbal =

Defunct Persian daily newspaper

- Type: Daily newspaper
- Managing editor: Morteza Fallah
- Ceased publication: July 2005
- Political alignment: Reformist
- Language: Persian
- Headquarters: Tehran
- Country: Iran

Eqbal (Persian: اقبال, lit. 'Luck') was a reformist newspaper published in Tehran, Iran. It was shut down in July 2005.

== History and profile ==
Eqbal was a reformist daily of which managing editor was Morteza Fallah. It was unofficially affiliated to the leading reformist party, the Islamic Iran Participation Front. Karim Arqandehpour was among senior editors of the paper. The paper supported Mostafa Moin in the presidential election in 2005.

== Closure ==
In June 2005, before the presidential election, the paper along with Aftab Yazd published the letter of presidential candidate Mehdi Karrubi to Supreme Leader Ali Khamenei. Upon this incident both papers were banned for one day by Tehran Public and Revolutionary Court on 20 June. In fact, two more dailies, namely Etemad, and Hayat-e-No, also published the letter of Karrubi and were banned by the same body. Following the ban Eqbal continued until July 2005 when it was closed down by the Iranian judiciary "for spreading lies and publishing false reports unrelated to Karrubi’s letter."
