= Ali Khatami =

Iranian politician

Seyyed Ali Khatami
- علی خاتمی

Head of President's Office
- In office 2 September 2001 – 3 August 2005
- President: Mohammad Khatami
- Preceded by: Mohammad-Ali Abtahi
- Succeeded by: Gholam-Hossein Elham

Personal details
- Party: Islamic Iran Participation Front
- Parent(s): Ruhollah Khatami (father); Sakineh Ziaee (mother)
- Relatives: Mohammad Khatami (brother); Mohammad-Reza Khatami (brother); Mohammad Reza Tabesh (nephew)
- Education: New York University Tandon School of Engineering

Ali Khatami is the younger brother of former Iranian president, Mohammad Khatami, and served as his chief of staff during his second term in office.

Khatami was born to Ruhollah Khatami, alongside older siblings Fatemeh Khatami and Mohammed Khatami and younger brother, Mohammad-Reza Khatami. He lived in Fort Lee, New Jersey while pursuing a master's degree in Industrial Engineering at Polytechnic University in Brooklyn.

In 2000, during his brother's first term as President of Iran, rumors circulated in the Iranian press that Ali Khatami was involved in the distribution of "videotapes in which the officials of the system were insulted". These rumors were denied by the President's office, and described as an effort to exert pressure on the President by showing his family in a damaging light. In 2001, Mohammed Khatami named Ali as his chief of staff, after being elected to a second term as President.
