= Gharavi =

Gharavi is a surname. Notable people with the surname include:

- Ali-Asghar Gharavi, Iranian scholar of religion
- Mohammad Hossein Gharavi (1879–1942), Iranian philosopher, jurist and poet
- Tina Gharavi (born 1972), British artist, director and screenwriter
