= Zahra Eshraghi =

Iranian activist (born 1964)

- زهرا اشراقی
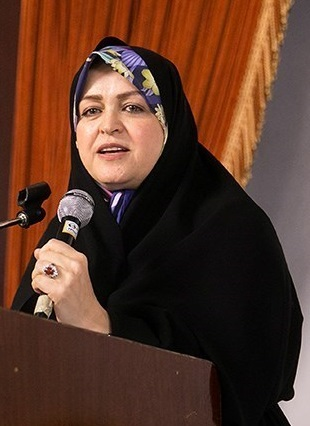
- Born: 1964 (age 61–62); Tehran, Imperial State of Iran
- Spouse: Mohammad Reza Khatami
- Children: Alireza, Fatemeh
- Parent(s): Shahab od-Din Eshraghi (father); Sedigheh Khomeini (mother)
- Relatives: Ruhollah Khomeini (grandfather); Khadijeh Saqafi (grandmother)

Zahra Eshraghi Khomeini (Persian: زهرا اشراقی, romanized: Zahrâ Eshrâqi) (born 1964) is an Iranian activist and former government official.

== Early life and education ==
Eshraghi was born in 1964. She is the granddaughter of Ayatollah Khomeini. She is a philosophy graduate.

== Views ==
Zahra Eshraghi wants the wearing of headscarves to no longer be compulsory. She believes that: "Our (Iran's) constitution still says that the man is the boss and the woman is a loyal wife who sacrifices herself for her family. But society here has changed, especially in the last 10 years. If my grandfather were here now, I am sure he would have had very different ideas."

She also stated "The constitution my grandfather approved says that only a man can be president... We would like to change the wording from 'man' to 'anyone'. But discrimination here is not just in the constitution. As a woman, if I want to get a passport to leave the country, have surgery, even breathe almost, I must have permission from my husband."

== Personal life ==
In 1983, Eshraghi married Mohammad-Reza Khatami, former head of the Islamic Iran Participation Front, the main reformist party in Iran and younger brother of former president Mohammad Khatami.

== Politics ==
In 2004, Eshraghi was blocked from running for parliament by the Guardian council, which vets the parliamentary candidates.

== See also ==
- Women in Iran
- List of Iranian women activists
- List of Muslim feminists
