= Amir Ahmadi Arian =

Iranian author (born 1979)

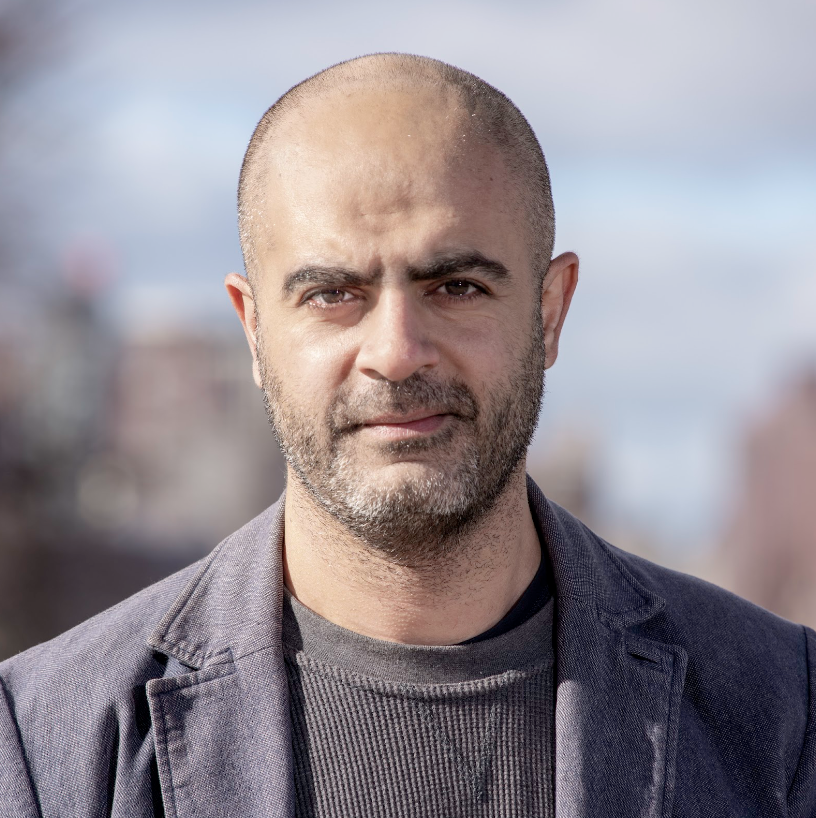
Amir Ahmadi Arian

Amir Ahmadi Arian (born 1979) is an Iranian author, journalist, and translator. He has published several Persian books before he switched to English in 2014. His first novel, Then The Fish Swallowed Him (2020) was a New York Times Editors' Choice in 2020.

As of 2023, Arian is a professor of creative writing at Binghamton University in New York.

== Early life and education ==
Arian was born in Ahvaz, a city in the Khuzestan province of Iran. as the oldest of four children. He spent his childhood in a war zone, where his mother worked as a nurse in hospitals at the frontline of the Iran–Iraq War, and his father, an engineer at the National Oil Company. He studied metallurgical engineering at the University of Tehran. He left Iran for Australia in 2011, and completed his Ph.D. in Comparative Literature at the University of Queensland. He earned an MFA from NYU's Creative Writing Program as the Axinn Foundation/E.L. Doctoral Fellowship recipient of 2016–2018.

== Career ==
Arian started his career writing columns and reviews, which appeared in 2000 in newspapers such as Hayat-e No, Hamshahri, and Karnameh magazine. He went on to become an influential journalist and essayist in Iran and a frequent contributor to the reformist newspapers of the early 2000s. He published over 200 articles and columns in a range of publications. Before leaving Iran, he published a selection of these pieces in his nonfiction book, Graffiti on the Paper Wall, which was selected as the best nonfiction book of the year by Tajrobeh magazine.

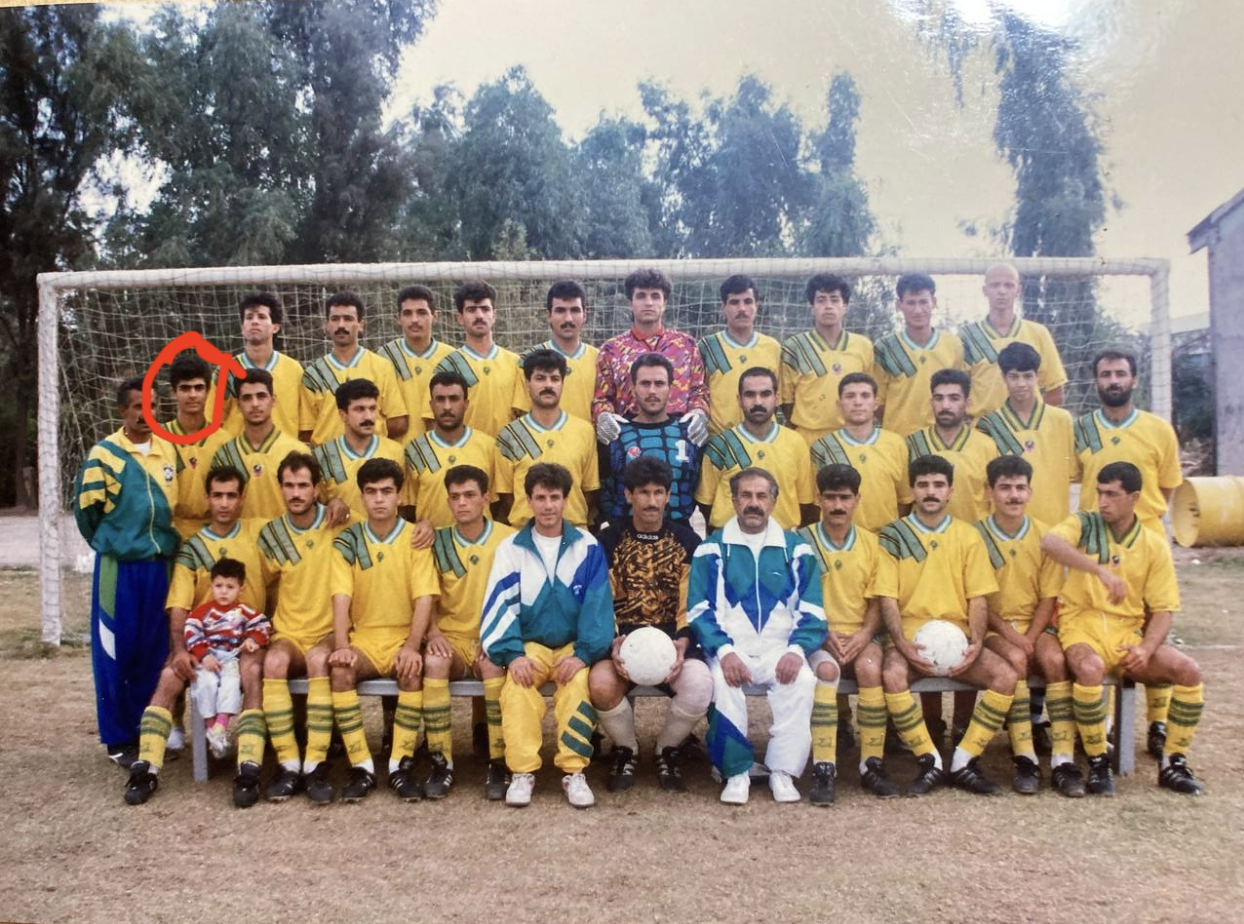
Arian as a soccer player in Sazman Ab team, Ahvaz, Khuzestan, Iran, 1996

Alongside his work as a journalist, Arian wrote fiction and published translations. He released his first work of fiction, Fragments of a Crime, in 2004. This work is a collection of ten linked short stories that explore the theme of femicide. In 2005 he wrote his first novel, A Mid November Day, depicting the life of a war-traumatized college student suffering from substance abuse in Tehran, who has lost his sense of reality. This book was banned by the Ministry of Culture and Islamic Guidance, but was later published in London in 2023. His subsequent book, The Cogwheels, follows the parallel lives of two characters in Tehran whose fate, unbeknownst to them, is entwined due to a car accident. A censored version of this novel was published in 2009, and was shortlisted for the Golshiri award. In 2009 he finished his third novel, Azrael's Tree, a crime story narrated from multiple points of view involving supernatural elements. This book was also banned. His next novel, The Absence of Danial, about the mysterious disappearance of a famous journalist, was banned too, and Arian self-published it later.

Arian was also a prolific translator. Notable works of his include translations from English to Persian of novels by E.L Doctorow, Paul Auster, P.D. James, and Cormac McCarthy.

After the government crackdown in the wake of the 2009 Iranian Green Movement, Arian, who lost his job as an editor and could no longer publish his work, left the country for Australia. While a Ph.D. student at the University of Queensland, he decided to write exclusively in English. In this phase of his career, he has published short stories and essays in The New York Times, Harper's, New York Review of Books, Paris Review, London Review of Books, Lithub, Massachusetts Review, Michigan Quarterly Review, Guernica, and elsewhere.

=== Then The Fish Swallowed Him ===
Arian's first novel in English, Then the Fish Swallowed Him, was published in 2020. In an interview with Shirin Neshat, he stated that he conceived of this story when he witnessed the 2004 bus drivers' union strike in Tehran. The idea of a story about an apolitical bus driver who gets swept up in political activism came to him at that time, but this was not something he could publish in Iran without getting into trouble. He carried the idea for twelve years, and finally started writing the novel in 2016 in New York. Then The Fish Swallowed Him was among The Millions' most anticipated books of 2020 and one of Thrillist's best books of 2020. It received positive reviews from The New York Times, The New Yorker, Shelf Awareness, The Commons, Asian Review of Books, and starred reviews from Publishers Weekly and Kirkus Review. It was a New York Times Editors' Choice. It has been translated to French, Turkish, Persian, and Arabic.

== Bibliography ==
=== Fiction ===
English

- Then The Fish Swallowed Him (Harpervia 2020)

Persian

- Tekkeha-ye Jenayat (Fragments of a Crime) Qesseh: 2005
- Nime-ye Azar Haftad-o Noh (A Mid November Day) Cheshmeh: 2006, banned in Iran, published in London by Mehri publications: 2023
- Charkhdande-ha (The Cogwheels) Cheshmeh: 2009
- Derakht-e Azrael (Azrael's Tree) Cheshmeh: 2010, banned in Iran
- The Absence of Danial (Ghyab-e Danial) Cheshmeh: 2011, banned in Iran

=== Nonfiction ===
Persian

- Shoarnevisi bar Divar-e Kaaghazi (Graffiti on the Paper Wall) Cheshmeh: 2012
