= 2004 Iranian legislative election =

| ← 2000 | 20 February and 7 May 2004 | 2008 → |

All 290 seats to the Islamic Consultative Assembly 146 seats needed for a majority
- Registered: 46,351,032
- Turnout: 51.21%
| | First party | Second party |
|---|---|---|
| Party | Parties: CCA; ISC; SDIR | Parties: ACC; AFIL; ECP; IISP; IAE; IAW; ILP; WH |
| Alliance | Principlists | Reformists |
| Seats won | 196 | 47 |
| Percentage | 67.58% | 16.20% |
| Electoral list | Alliance of Builders | Coalition For Iran |
- Composition of the Assembly following the election
Speaker before election
Mehdi Karroubi
Combatant Clerics
Elected Speaker
Gholam-Ali Haddad-Adel
Alliance of Builders

The Iranian parliamentary elections of February 20 and May 7, 2004 were a victory for Islamic conservatives over the reformist parties. Assisting the conservative victory was the disqualification of about 2500 reformist candidates earlier in January.

== Background ==
The first round of the 2004 elections to the Iranian Parliament were held on February 20, 2004. Most of the 290 seats were decided at that time but a runoff was held 2½ months later on May 7, 2004, for the remaining thirty-nine seats where no candidate gained sufficient votes in the first round. In the Tehran area, the runoff elections were postponed to be held with the Iranian presidential election of June 17, 2005.

The elections took place amidst a serious political crisis following the January 2004 decision to ban about 2500 candidates — nearly half of the total — including 80 sitting Parliament deputies. This decision, by the conservative Council of Guardians vetting body, "shattered any pretense of Iranian democracy", according to some observers.

The victims of the ban were reformists, particularly members of the Islamic Iran Participation Front (IIPF), and included several leaders. Prominent banned candidates included Ebrahim Asgharzadeh, Mohsen Mirdamadi, Mohammad-Reza Khatami and Jamileh Kadivar. In many parts of Iran, there weren't even enough independent candidates approved, so the reformists couldn't form an alliance with them. Out of a possible 285 seats (5 seats are reserved for religious minorities: Christians, Jews, and Zoroastrians), the participating reformist parties could only introduce 191 candidates. Many pro-reform social and political figures, including Shirin Ebadi, asked people not to vote (although some reformist party leaders, such as those in the IIPF, specifically mentioned they would not be boycotting the elections). Some moderate reformists, however, including President Mohammad Khatami, urged citizens to vote in order to deny the conservative candidates an easy majority.

Conservative political groups included the Militant Clergy Association and the Islamic Coalition Society. Liberal–reformist groups included the Militant Clerics Society, Islamic Iran Participation Front, Construction Executives, and Worker's House.

The day before the election, the reformist newspapers Yas-e-no and Shargh were banned.

== Results ==
Inter-Parliamentary Union

20 February and 7 May 2004 Majlis of Iran election results
| Orientiation of candidates | Seats (1st rd.) | Seats (2nd rd.) | Seats (Total) | % |
|---|---|---|---|---|
| Conservatives | 156 | 40 | 196 | 67.58% |
| Reformists | 39 | 8 | 47 | 16.20% |
| Independents | 31 | 9 | 40 | 13.79% |
| Undecided | 59 | 2 | 2 | 0.68% |
| Armenians (reserved seat) | 2 | — | 2 | 0.68% |
| Assyrians (reserved seat) | 1 | — | 1 | 0.34% |
| Jewish (reserved seat) | 1 | — | 1 | 0.34% |
| Zoroastrian (reserved seat) | 1 | — | 1 | 0.34% |
| Total (Decided seats) | 231 | 59 | 288 | 99.31 |
Source: IPU (1st round), Rulers (2nd round)

CIA

According to the Central Intelligence Agency (CIA) analysis, conservatives won 190 seats, reformists won 50 and independents won 43.

Kazemzadeh (2008)

| Faction | Seats | Bloc seats |
|---|---|---|
| Right-wing hardliners | 200 | 240^{a} |
| Reformists^{b} | 40 | |
| Independents | 40 | —^{a} |
| Vacant seats | 10 | — |
| Total | 290 | |
Source: Kazemzadeh^{a} All independents were allied with hardliners^{a} Reformist are from ACC faction only

=== Analysis ===
Political historian Ervand Abrahamian credits the victory of Abadgaran and other conservatives in the 2004 elections (as well as the 2003 and 2005 elections) to the conservatives' retention of their core base of 25% of the voting population; their recruiting of war veteran candidates; their wooing of independents using the issue of national security; and most of all "because large numbers of women, college students, and other members of the salaried middle class" who make up the reformists' base of support "stayed home". Pro-reform voters were discouraged by division in the reform movement and by the disqualifying of reform candidates from running for office.

== Official statistics (from the Ministry of Interior) ==
- Total candidates: 4679
- Decided in the first round: 225 of 289 seats
- To be decided in the second round: 64 seats
- Number of voting booths in the country: 39,885
- Number of staff: about 600,000
- Number of voters: 23,725,724 (1,971,748 in Tehran and its suburbs)
