= Ruhollah Khatami =

Iranian Ayatollah (1906–1988)

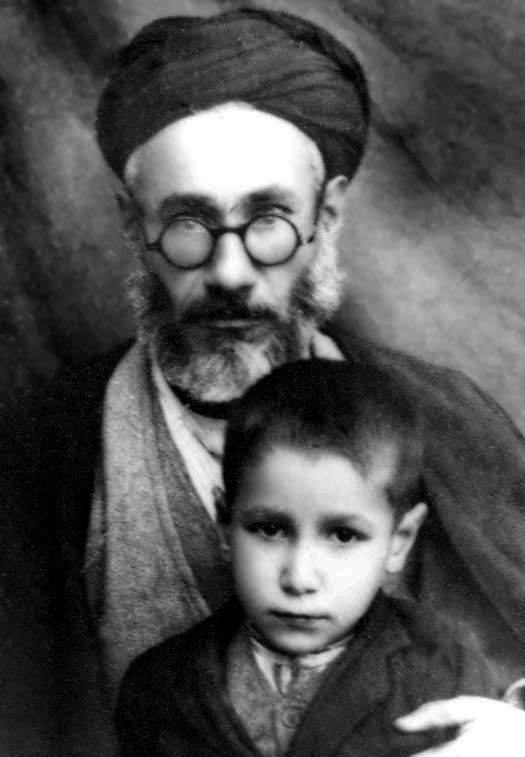
Ruhollah Khatami with his son Mohammad Khatami in 1948

Seyyed Ruhollah Khatami (Persian: سید روح‌الله خاتمی; 28 October 1906 – 27 October 1988) was a senior Iranian cleric in the central Iranian city of Yazd, where he was appointed prayer leader by Ruhollah Khomeini in July 1982.

He is the father of a number of notable Iranian politicians, including former president Mohammad Khatami, Islamic Iran Participation Front founder Mohammad-Reza Khatami, former presidential chief of staff Ali Khatami, and Fatemeh Khatami, who was elected to Ardakan's city council in 1999.
