= Hadi Ghabel =

Iranian cleric

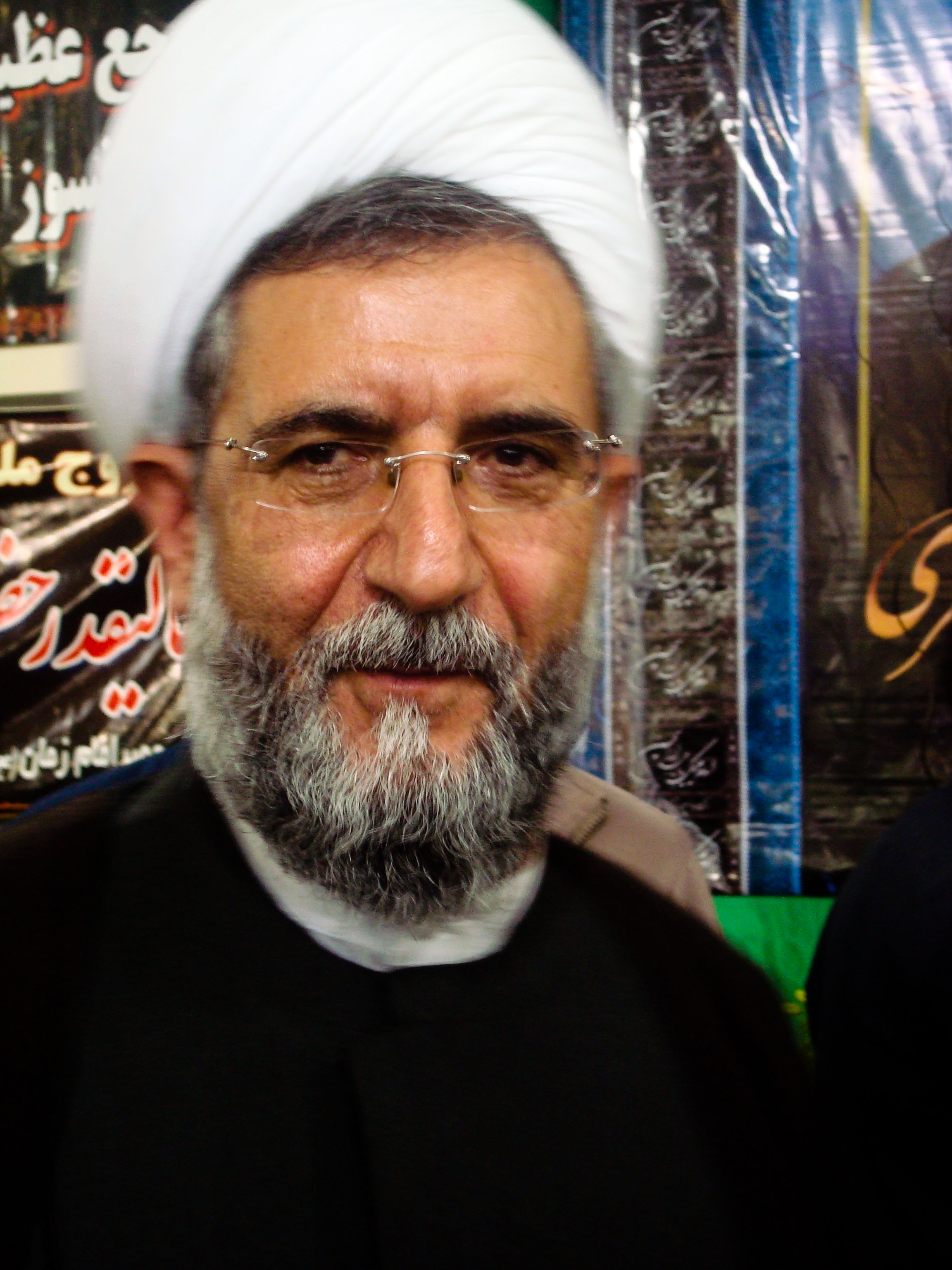
Hadi Ghabel (2013)

Hadi Ghabel is an Iranian cleric and member of the central council of the reformist Islamic Iran Participation Front. He was imprisoned on April 7, 2008 to begin a 40-month jail term following prosecution and conviction by the Special Court for the Clergy. The Special Court, charged with investigating other clerics for alleged crimes, has prosecuted clerics who challenge official religious interpretations of the Islamic Republic. According to the International Campaign for Human Rights in Iran, "the court’s prosecution of religious scholars, based solely on their beliefs and opinions constitutes a form of modern inquisition aimed at rooting out clerics whose beliefs are considered politically threatening."

== Life ==
According to Roozonline, security agents approached Ghabel’s house in April 2008 "on the pretext of having religious questions." When the cleric appeared at the front of his house, the agents "pushed their way inside and after searching the rooms confiscated his papers, writings and computer, and took him to prison." After his arrest, Hadi Ghabel was taken to the Clerics Court and "interrogated repeatedly during his two month detention" despite "the express legal provisions that political crimes must be reviewed in the presence of a jury and must be public."

Ghabel was sentenced to one year in prison for “acting against national security,” 10 months for “propaganda against state,” 15 months for “disturbing public opinion,” 100 days for “aspersion of the clergy,” and a fine of 5 million Rials ($550 USD) for “insulting the authorities.” He was also defrocked.

Ghabel was one of six political prisoners highlighted in International Campaign for Human Rights in Iran's September 18, 2008 document "Rights Crisis Escalates, Faces and Cases from Ahmadinejad's Crackdown"

== See also ==
- Human rights in Iran
- Special Clerical Court

== Sources ==
- RIGHTS CRISIS ESCALATES, September 2008
- Ghabel Ends Up in Prison Too. A Judgment Calculated to be Implemented after Elections - 2008.04.09
