= Behzad Nabavi =

Iranian politician (born 1941)

- بهزاد نبوی
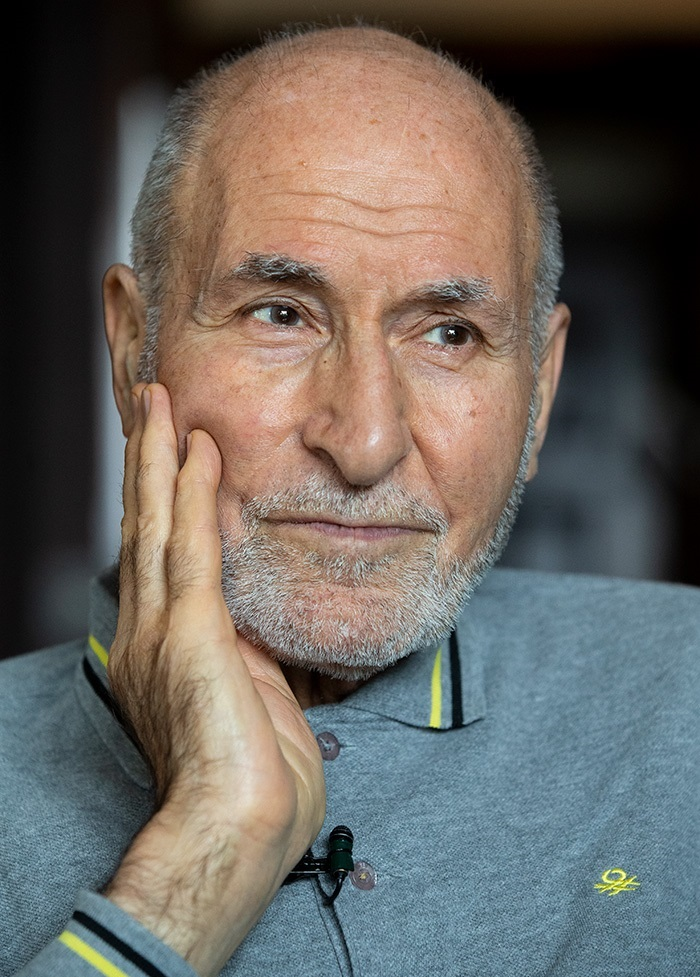

First Deputy of the Parliament of Iran
- In office 28 May 2002 – 28 May 2003
- Preceded by: Mohammad Reza Khatami
- Succeeded by: Mohammad Reza Khatami
- In office 26 May 2000 – 28 May 2001
- Preceded by: Hassan Rouhani
- Succeeded by: Mohammad Reza Khatami

Member of the Parliament of Iran
- In office 26 May 2000 – 18 April 2004
- Constituency: Tehran, Rey, Shemiranat and Eslamshahr
- Majority: 1,148,840 (39.19%)

Minister of Heavy Industries
- In office 31 May 1982 – 29 August 1989
- President: Ali Khamenei
- Prime Minister: Mir-Hossein Mousavi
- Preceded by: Mostafa Hashemitaba
- Succeeded by: Hadi Nejad Hosseynian

Minister without portfolio for Executive Affairs
- In office 10 September 1980 – 31 May 1982
- President: Abolhassan Banisadr; Mohammad Ali Rajai; Ali Khamenei
- Prime Minister: Mohammad Ali Rajai; Mohammad Javad Bahonar; Mohammad Reza Mahdavi Kani; Mir-Hossein Mousavi
- Succeeded by: Gholam Reza Aghazadeh

Personal details
- Born: 29 September 1941 (age 85) Tehran, Iran
- Party: Mojahedin of the Islamic Revolution of Iran Organization
- Other political affiliations: MIRO (1979–83); MKO (1969–75); NF (1961–65)
- Spouse: Hengameh Razavi
- Children: 2
- Education: Amir Kabir University of Technology
- Nickname: The Old Guerilla

Behzad Nabavi (Persian: بهزاد نبوی) (born 1941) is an Iranian reformist politician. He served as Deputy Speaker of the Parliament of Iran and was one of the founders of the Reformist party Mojahedin of the Islamic Revolution Organization. Before his career as a democratic reformist, Nabavi was considered an ideologue of the Iranian Islamic left until conservatives in the 1990s sidelined that force.

== Early life ==
Nabavi was born in Tehran in 1941. His father was a historian, He graduated from Amir Kabir University of Technology with a bachelor's degree in electrical engineering in the mid-1960s. He received a master's degree in electrical engineering in 1964.

== Career and activities ==
Nabavi started his political activity as a guerrilla fighter against the Pahlavi government and served a prison term as a result. He had personally confirmed that when he was arrested in 1972, he had tried suicide by swallowing a cyanide pill, which "fortunately or unfortunately" did not work.

During the Islamic Revolution he was among the founders of the Islamic Revolution Committees (known as komite or komiteh in Iran), which served as a security force mainly working against armed opposition parties and militia, the early years of the Islamic Republic. Nabavi was also a founder of the intelligence office under the Presidency, which later became the ministry of intelligence.

Nabavi acted as the chief negotiator of Iran during the discussions with United States officials in the Iran hostage crisis, where he has been described as a "radical" who gained influence at the expense of "moderates" as a result of the crisis.

Nabavi served in different posts in the government of Iran, including a member of the Central Committee of the Islamic Revolution, the head of the Setad-e Basij-e Eghtesadi-e Keshvar (the body that introduced government-issued coupons because of economical difficulties of the Iran–Iraq War), which made the conservatives call him a couponist (which rhymes with communist in Persian), minister of heavy industries under Mir-Hossein Mousavi, and a representative of Tehran to the parliament (39% of ballots in 2000).

He also worked in some state-owned petroleum companies. He acted as the chairman of the board in Petropars and a consultant to the CEO in Mapna, a company working on the expansion of oil refineries in Iran.

As a member of the parliament, Nabavi has been one of the major critics of the Council of Guardians, the body which both vets candidates for political office and can veto legislation passed by parliament. In turn, the council banned him from running for re-election for parliamental in 2004 along with 80 other incumbents. On 1 February 2004, Nabavi resigned from parliament with more than 100 MPs, and his resignation was accepted by a 154/22/7 (for/against/absentation) vote by the parliament on 18 April 2004. In his resignation speech, he mentioned the "violation of public rights" as his main reason for resignation.

Nabavi was also prohibited from running for office in other elections and summoned by the judiciary for libel and "disturbing the public mind", when he was serving as an MP and hence certain restrictions applied for such summoning.

Behzad Nabavi and Ali Akbar Mohtashami were among those who prevented by the Guardian council from taking part in the elections of Majlis.

== Arrest ==
Nabavi was arrested after the 2009 Iran Presidential Election. He was sentenced to six years in prison by the court in February 2010.

Assembly seats
Preceded by Hassan Rouhani	1st Vice Speaker of Parliament of Iran; 2000–2001; 2002–2003	Succeeded by Mohammad Reza Khatami
Preceded by Mohammad Reza Khatami	1st Vice Speaker of Parliament of Iran; 2000–2001; 2002–2003	Succeeded by Mohammad Reza Khatami
Preceded by Mohammad Reza Khatami	2nd Vice Speaker of Parliament of Iran; 2003–2004	Succeeded by Ali Shakouri-Rad
