= Alireza Alavitabar =

Iranian writer

Alireza Alavitabar (Persian: علیرضا علوی‌تبار; born 1960) is an Iranian political scientist and a leading reformist intellectual and writer.

He holds a doctorate in political sciences and is a member of the Institute for Planning and Development's faculty.

Alavitabar is a member of Islamic Iran Participation Front and was the editor of the now closed Sobh-e-Emrooz newspaper.

In the 1990s, Alireza Alavitabar rose to prominence as a result of his journalistic work and reflections on the politics of the Second Khordad Reform Movement during Khatami's presidency.

Alireza Alavitabar was among the many journalists banned for publishing against Iran's regime in 2002.

== Publications/Works ==
Editorial roles:

- Bahman, 1996
- Rah -e no, 1998
- Sobh-e-Emrooz, 1999
- Alavitabar, Alireza. Eghtesade Siasi va Khatte Mashigozarie Omoumi. ISBN 978-9-641-85508-8.
- Alireza, Alavitabar; Mehdi, Rasouli Ghahroudi; Sahel, Zaboli (2019). "The impact of negative political advertising and election participation". Imam Sadiq University. 15 (2): 443–464. ISSN 2008-0743. Archived from the original on 2022-10-18.
- Alireza, Alavitabar; Zahir, Alimoradi; Ali, Jahangiri (2020). "Identification of provinces of Islamic Republic of Iran's local self-government preventing factors". Journal of Economics and Regional Development. 26 (18): 137–172. doi:10.22067/erd.v26i18.74209.
