= Davoud Soleymani =

Iranian politician

Davoud Soleymani (داوود سلیمانی) is an Iranian politician. Soleymani was the Vice Minister of Student Affairs in the Ministry of Science, Research and Technology under the ministry of former Minister Mostafa Moin.

He was also a representative from Tehran on sixth term of Iranian Islamic Parliament, Majlis.
