= Mojtaba Vahedi =

Iranian politician (born 1964)

Seyed Mojtaba Vahedi
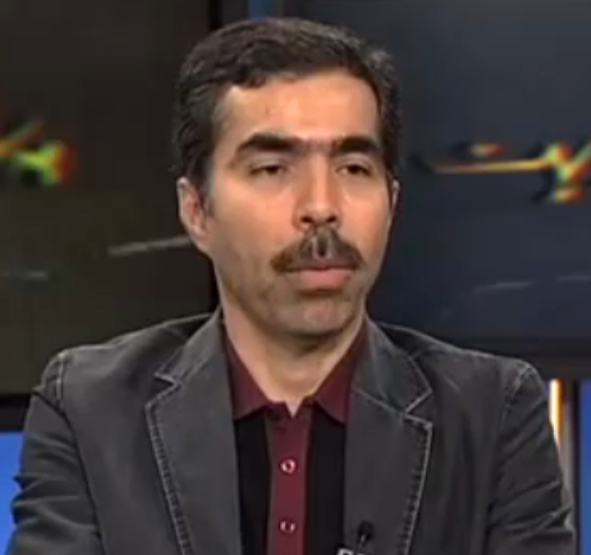
- Born: August 27, 1964 (age 61); Qom, Iran
- Known for: Editor-in-chief of Aftab Yazd
- Political party: National Trust Party

Seyed Mojtaba Vahedi (Persian: سید مجتبی واحدی) is an Iranian journalist and political figure with a complex background. He was born into an Islamist family and was involved in the Iranian Revolution of 1979, which overthrew the Pahlavi dynasty and established the Islamic Republic of Iran. After the revolution, Vahedi worked as a journalist and rose to become the editor-in-chief of the Aftab Yazd newspaper. He also served as a senior advisor to Mehdi Karroubi, a reformist politician and opposition figure.

However, despite his initial involvement with the revolution, Vahedi eventually became disillusioned with the Islamic government and is now a critic of it.
