= Ali-Asghar Gharavi =

Iranian scholar

- Born: c. 1943 or 1944 (age 81–82); Isfahan, Iran
- Education: Saint Joseph University
- Political party: Freedom Movement of Iran

Seyyed Ali-Asghar Gharavi (Persian: سید علی‌اصغر غروی) is an Iranian scholar of religion. He is also a political activist affiliated with the Freedom Movement of Iran.

According to the In These Times magazine, he is "one of Iran's most prominent pro-democracy activists and political thinkers".

In 1998, he was arrested and summoned to the Special Clerical Court for criticizing the regime in Iran. In 2013, Bahar newspaper was banned for publishing an article written by Gharavi, titled “Imam Ali, a Political Leader or a Religious Model?”. He was accused of "blasphemy" for implicitly challenging Iran's Supreme Leader.

Party political offices
Unknown	Head of the Freedom Movement of Iran Branch in Isfahan; Unknown–present	Incumbent
