= Mosharekat =

Former pro-reform newspaper in Iran

Mosharekat (Persian: مشاركت; meaning Participation) was a former pro-reform newspaper of the Islamic Iran Participation Front which was one of 13 reformist newspapers banned in Iran in April 2000. The licence of the paper was owned by Mohammad Reza Khatami.
