= Elaheh Koulaei =

Iranian political scientist

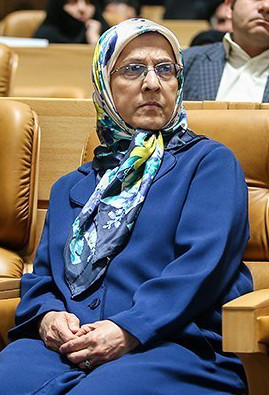
- Koulaei in a conference of Commemoration of the Lady of the Islamic Revolution in 2015

Member of the Parliament of Iran
- In office 28 May 2000 – 28 May 2004
- Constituency: Tehran, Rey, Shemiranat and Eslamshahr
- Majority: 1,054,003 (35.95%)

Personal details
- Born: 17 December 1956 (age 69) Tehran, Iran
- Party: Islamic Iran Participation Front (1998–2009); Union of Islamic Iran People Party
- Children: 4
- Education: National University of Iran (Shahid Beheshti University) (BA); Tarbiat Modares University (MA, PhD)

Elaheh Koulaei (Persian: الهه کولایی; born 17 December 1956) is an Iranian professor of political science, political scientist, reformist politician, and intellectual. She was a Member of the sixth Parliament of the Islamic Republic of Iran from 2000 to 2004.

She has spoken out against child marriage in Iran, the compulsory hijab in Iran, and the Iran government's crackdown on the 2025–2026 Iranian protests.

== Early and personal life ==
Koulaei was born in Tehran, Iran, on 17 December 1956.

In 1982 she received a bachelor's degree in political science from the National University of Iran (Shahid Beheshti University) in Tehran. In 1988, she received a master's degree in political science from Tarbiat Modares University in Tehran, where she studied Central Eurasia Studies. In 1992 she received a PhD in International Relations from Tarbiat Modarres University.

Koulaei is married, and has four children.

== Professor ==
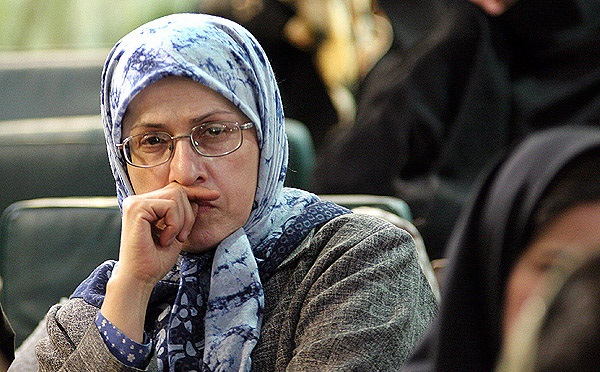
Elaheh Koulaei

Koulaei is a professor of political science at Tehran University, at which she has taught since 1986. There, she is the founder and the Director of the Center for Central Eurasia Studies (CCES) from 2005 to present, and was the director of the Regional Studies Department at the Faculty of Law and Political Science from 2007 to 2010 and 2015–19. In 2011 to 2012 she took a sabbatical in North Carolina State University in the United States. She has written and translated 34 books, and published approximately 200 scientific articles about Russia, Central Eurasia, Caucasus, Iran's foreign policy, and women's issues.

== Member of Parliament (2000–04) ==
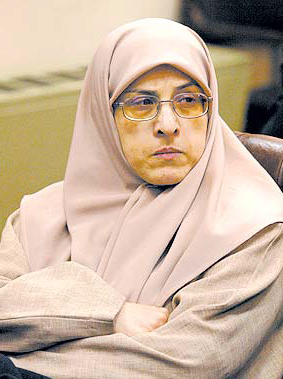
Koulaei in 2003

Koulaei was a member of the Central Council of the Islamic Iran Participation Front, the largest reformist party of Iran, from 1998 to 2009 when it was banned. She was its Deputy Director General from 2004 to 2009.

She ran for election to the Iranian parliament, was one of 13 women who won a position in the 290-member body, and was a member of the sixth parliament of the Islamic Republic of Iran (2000–2004). Koulaei was also a member and speaker of the Commission on National Security and Foreign Policy of Iran.

As a member of parliament, instead of wearing a chador she often wore a colorful headscarf and a light overcoat, attracting criticism and protests due to her challenging typical dress norms in government buildings. Koulaei said that she refused to wear the chador in order to emphasize individual freedom, saying: "We cannot speak of freedom, when we do not grant freedom of dress."

In 2000, speaking on the subject of child marriage in Iran she said:

We live in a society in which women's rights, the human rights of very young girls, are ignored under [Iran's law adopted after the 1979 Islamic revolution that allows fathers to marry off their daughters who are as young as 9]. You see a child married at the age of 9 who is forced to get involved in daily economic problems. The law must provide appropriately for such children.

Koulaei was head of the Iran-Russia Parliamentarian Friendship Group in Iran in 2003.

In January 2004, Iran's Guardian Council ruled that Koulaei was disqualified as a candidate for reelection to Iran's parliament. It asserted that her "‘belief and commitment to Islam, the Islamic Republic, Velayat-e Faqih (the office of the Supreme Leader), and the constitution" was in question .

== Views ==
In 2012, Koulaei spoke out against a bill in Iran's Parliament to prevent women below 40 years of age from leaving Iran without the permission of a male guardian.

Commenting on the compulsory hijab in Iran, Koulaei said

"It is not possible to promote Islamic values with jailing and lashing..... The parliament should take an action to reform the law of obligatory hijab. Introducing these reforms at the right time is undoubtedly common sense."

In 2024 she co-signed a letter that said "The repressive policies against women under the pretext of compulsory hijab are ... an attempt to distract public attention from rampant corruption and inept social administration."

Koulaei was among hundreds of academic faculty who signed a letter condemning the Iran government's crackdown on the 2025–2026 Iranian protests, and the government's failure to prevent a future attack on Iran by the United States and Israel in response to the crackdown.

== See also ==
- Iranian women
- List of famous Persian women
- List of Muslim feminists
- Persian women's movement
