= Bahar (newspaper) =

Iranian daily newspaper

- Type: Daily newspaper
- Managing editor: Saeed Pourazizi
- Founded: 1 May 2000; 26 years ago
- Political alignment: Reformism (Iranian)
- Language: Persian
- Headquarters: Tehran
- Country: Iran
- Website: Bahar

Bahar (Persian: بهار, lit. 'The Spring') is a reformist newspaper published in Tehran, Iran. It has been in circulation since 2000 and has been subject to bans.

== History and profile ==
Bahar was established in May 2000. The managing editor of the paper was Saeed Pourazizi who served as director general of the Presidential Media Office when Mohammad Khatami was in office.

Bahar has been banned for several times. It was banned on 9 August 2000. Following ten-year ban it was relaunched in January 2010. However, it was again closed down by the Press Supervisory Board on 19 April 2010 for "publishing items contrary to reality" and "creating doubt regarding major issues such as the elections." It was later republished. However, in October 2013 it was again closed down by Iran's state press watchdog due to the publication of an article which was regarded as undermining Islamic principles. The article which was written by religious–nationalist activist Asghar Gharavi also questioned the legitimacy of the supreme leader. It was the first publication banned in the country following the presidency of Hassan Rouhani.

One of the contributors of Bahar is Masoumeh Ebtekar, and in one of her 2013 articles she argued that Iranian women have necessary religious and political qualifications which make them eligible to run for the presidency.
