= Mohammad-Reza Khatami =

Iranian reformist politician and nephrologist (born 1959)

Seyyed Mohammad-Reza Khatami
- محمدرضا خاتمی
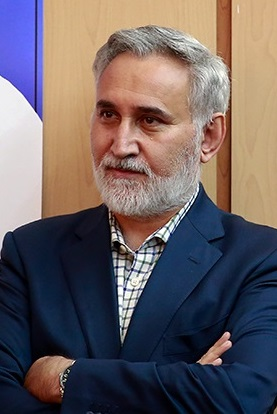
- Mohammad Reza Khatami in 2019

First Deputy of the Parliament of Iran
- In office 28 May 2003 – 28 May 2004
- Preceded by: Behzad Nabavi
- Succeeded by: Mohammad-Reza Bahonar
- In office 28 May 2001 – 28 May 2002
- Preceded by: Behzad Nabavi
- Succeeded by: Behzad Nabavi

Member of the Parliament of Iran
- In office 26 May 2000 – 28 May 2004
- Constituency: Tehran, Rey, Shemiranat and Eslamshahr
- Majority: 1,794,365 (61.21%)

Personal details
- Born: 1958 (age 67–68) Ardakan, Imperial State of Iran
- Party: Union of Islamic Iran People Party
- Spouse: Zahra Eshraghi
- Children: 2
- Parent(s): Ruhollah Khatami (father); Sakineh Ziaee (mother)
- Relatives: Mohammad Khatami (brother); Ali Khatami (brother); Mohammad Reza Tabesh (nephew)
- Education: Tehran University of Medical Sciences

Mohammad-Reza Khatami (Persian: محمدرضا خاتمی, born 1958) is an Iranian reformist politician and nephrologist.

== Early life and education ==
Khatami was born in 1958 in Ardakan, Iran. He is the youngest brother of former president Mohammad Khatami. Khatami is educated in medicine and before entering politics, he was a practicing nephrologist (kidney specialist) for a number of years. He is a faculty member of Tehran University of Medical sciences.

== Career ==
Khatami was the first Secretary-General of the Islamic Iran Participation Front, the largest Iranian reformist party. He is now a member of the central council of the party. He is also the former deputy speaker of the Iranian parliament. He entered politics in 1997 after his brother's victory and was appointed deputy minister of health.

He was elected in March 2000 for the sixth term of the Islamic Republic's parliament's election as the first representative of Tehran with 1,794,365 votes from the people of Tehran. He has also acted as the manager in charge of the now-banned reformist daily Mosharekat. Sometimes described as "ultraliberal" in his views, he was "disqualified from running for any office by the Guardian Council."

== Personal life ==
In 1983, at the young age of 25, Khatami married Zahra Eshraghi, a granddaughter of Ruhollah Khomeini (founder of the Islamic republic) and an activist in women's rights. They have two children — a daughter, Fatemeh, who at the moment studying at a university in London, and a son, Ali.

On 28 March 2020, Khatami announced he has tested positive for COVID-19 while publishing a video showing him at a hospital.

Assembly seats
Preceded by Behzad Nabavi	1st Vice Speaker of Parliament of Iran; 2001–2002; 2003–2004	Succeeded by Behzad Nabavi
Preceded by Behzad Nabavi	1st Vice Speaker of Parliament of Iran; 2001–2002; 2003–2004	Succeeded by Mohammad-Reza Bahonar
Preceded by Mohammad Ali Movahedi Kermani	2nd Vice Speaker of Parliament of Iran; 2000–2001; 2002–2003	Succeeded by Mohsen Armin
Preceded by Mohsen Armin	2nd Vice Speaker of Parliament of Iran; 2000–2001; 2002–2003	Succeeded by Behzad Nabavi
Academic offices
Preceded by Mohammad-Javad Larijani	President of the Majlis Research Center; 2000–2004	Succeeded by Ahmad Tavakoli
Party political offices
New title Party established	Secretary-General of Islamic Iran Participation Front; 1997–2006	Succeeded by Mohsen Mirdamadi
Honorary titles
Preceded by Ali Akbar Nategh-Nouri	Most voted MP for Tehran, Rey, Shemiranat and Eslamshahr; 2000	Succeeded by Gholam-Ali Haddad-Adel
