= Aftab Yazd =

Persian-language daily reformist newspaper in Iran

- Type: Daily newspaper
- Publisher: Mojtaba Vahedi
- Founded: August 2000
- Political alignment: Reformist
- Language: Persian
- Headquarters: Tehran
- Circulation: 100,000 (2008 est.)
- Website: Aftab-e Yazd

Aftab-e Yazd (Persian: آفتاب یزد, lit. 'The Yazd Sun') is a Persian-language daily reformist newspaper published in Tehran, Iran. The title of the paper means "the sun of Yazd" in Persian.

== History and profile ==
Aftab Yazd was started in August 2000. The paper, based in Tehran, is affiliated with the Association of Combatant Clerics (of which former president Mohammad Khatami is a leading member). The paper focuses on political, cultural, social and economic news.

In June 2005, before the 2005 presidential election, the paper along with another one, Eqbal, published the letter of presidential candidate Mahdi Karroubi to Supreme Leader Ali Khamenei. Upon this publication both papers were banned for one day by Tehran Public and Revolutionary Court. The daily was also temporarily ceased in June 2009 following the presidential elections. In December 2009 it was again warned by the ministry of culture for publishing "divisive" material.

== See also ==
- List of newspapers in Iran
