= Mohsen Mirdamadi =

Iranian academic and politician (born 1955)

- محسن میردامادی
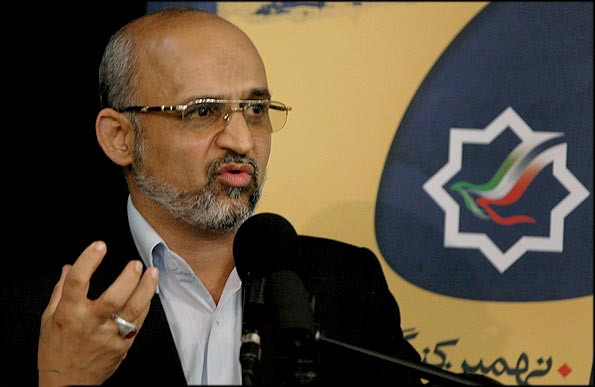

Member of Parliament of Iran
- In office 28 May 2000 – 28 May 2004
- Constituency: Tehran, Rey, Shemiranat and Eslamshahr
- Majority: 1,188,309 (40.5%)

Governor of Khuzestan province
- In office 1987–1989
- President: Ali Khamenei
- Prime Minister: Mir-Hossein Mousavi
- Preceded by: Ali Jannati
- Succeeded by: Mohammad-Hassan Tavallayi

Personal details
- Born: 1955 (age 70–71) Najafabad, Isfahan, Iran
- Party: Islamic Iran Participation Front
- Education: University of Tehran

Mohsen Mirdamadi Najafabadi (Persian: محسن میردامادی نجف‌آبادی, born 1955 in Najafabad, Isfahan) is an Iranian academic and politician. He is the Deputy Secretary General of "Ettehad-e Mellat", the largest pro-reform political party in Iran. After the 2009 Iranian Presidential Elections, he was sentenced to and put to 6 years of prison, among other leaders of reformist party. Previously, he was elected as a member of the Parliament of Iran (the 6th Majlis) from 2000 until 2004, during which time he chaired the parliament's Commission of National Security and Foreign Policy. He received his PhD from Cambridge University in 1997 in Foreign Relations. He has served in various political roles since the 1979 Iranian Revolution, including serving as the governor of Khuzestan province in the last years of the Iran-Iraq war. He was among the organizers of the 1979 Iran hostage crisis.

== Biography ==
He was among the organizers of the 1979 Iran hostage crisis. He was the governor of the bordered Khuzestan Province in the last couple of years of the 8-year war between Iran and Iraq. He has earned his PhD in Foreign Relationships from the University of Cambridge in 1997. He was elected as a member of the parliament of Iran (the 6th Majlis after the Iranian 1979 revolution) from 2000 until 2004, in which he chaired the parliament's Commission of National Security and Foreign Policy. He was the Secretary-General of "the largest pro-reform party" in Iran, Islamic Iran Participation Front (IIPF) since 11 August 2006 until the front was disbanded by an Iranian court. He was sentenced and put to 6 years of prison, among other leaders of reformist parties, after the 2009 Iranian presidential election. He is now the deputy secretary general of the "Ettehad-e Mellat" political party, which is now the largest pro-reform party in Iran.

In 2000 he ran for parliament as a reformist on a platform of freedom and restoring the rule-of-law to Iran, easily winning his seat. In an interview in Tehran with American journalist Robin Wright he explained

We always wanted a country that had independence, freedoms, and was an Islamic republic ... But today our emphasis is on freedoms ... The future now depends on what the people want, not what a few politicians or religious leaders prefer. Leaders in all ruling classes should be checked by the people .... there are – and should be – many different interpretations of Islam. And the people have the right to listen to those different interpretations ... No one has the right to impose his ideas on everyone else.

As the chairman of the National Security and Foreign Policy Commission of the 6th Majlis, Mohsen Mirdamadi hosted several diplomats visiting Iran. He also led a few Iranian delegates visiting other countries and officials and led the first Iranian delegate that visited the EU Parliament since the establishment of the Islamic Republic of Iran. In 2002, he had some negotiations with the EU Chief of Policy Foreign Union European, Javier Solana and gave a speech in the European Union Parliament.

Mohsen Mirdamadi was the director of the Nowruz newspaper which covered Iranian reformists points of view. In 2003, the Iranian Judiciary Power held over 8 sessions of trial, and sentenced Mohsen Mirdamadi to 6-month jail while he was still a member of the parliament and still chaired the Commission of National Security and Foreign Policy. The court also banned the Nowruz newspaper and stopped its publishing.

He was also banned from running for re-election in the parliament, in the February 2004 along with 80 other incumbents, and along with 2500 non-incumbents by the Council of Guardians.

Although he is the secretary general of the largest reformist party in Iran, in December 2006, he harshly criticized the university students who raided and protested Mahmoud Ahmadinejad's speech in Amirkabir University. (see: December 2006 student protest)

Human Rights Watch reported that he was arrested in June 2009, amidst the 2009 Iranian election protests. After his arrest he was held in solitary confinement for 110 days. He finished his six-year sentence in Evin prison, and was released on 2017.

== Notes ==
Party political offices
Preceded by Mohammad-Reza Khatami	Secretary-General of Islamic Iran Participation Front; 11 August 2006–present	Incumbent
Preceded by Emad Khatami	Political Deputy Secretary-General of Union of Islamic Iran People Party; 25 December 2019–present	Incumbent
