= Mostafa Moeen =

Iranian politician, professor of pediatrics and human rights activist

- مصطفی معین
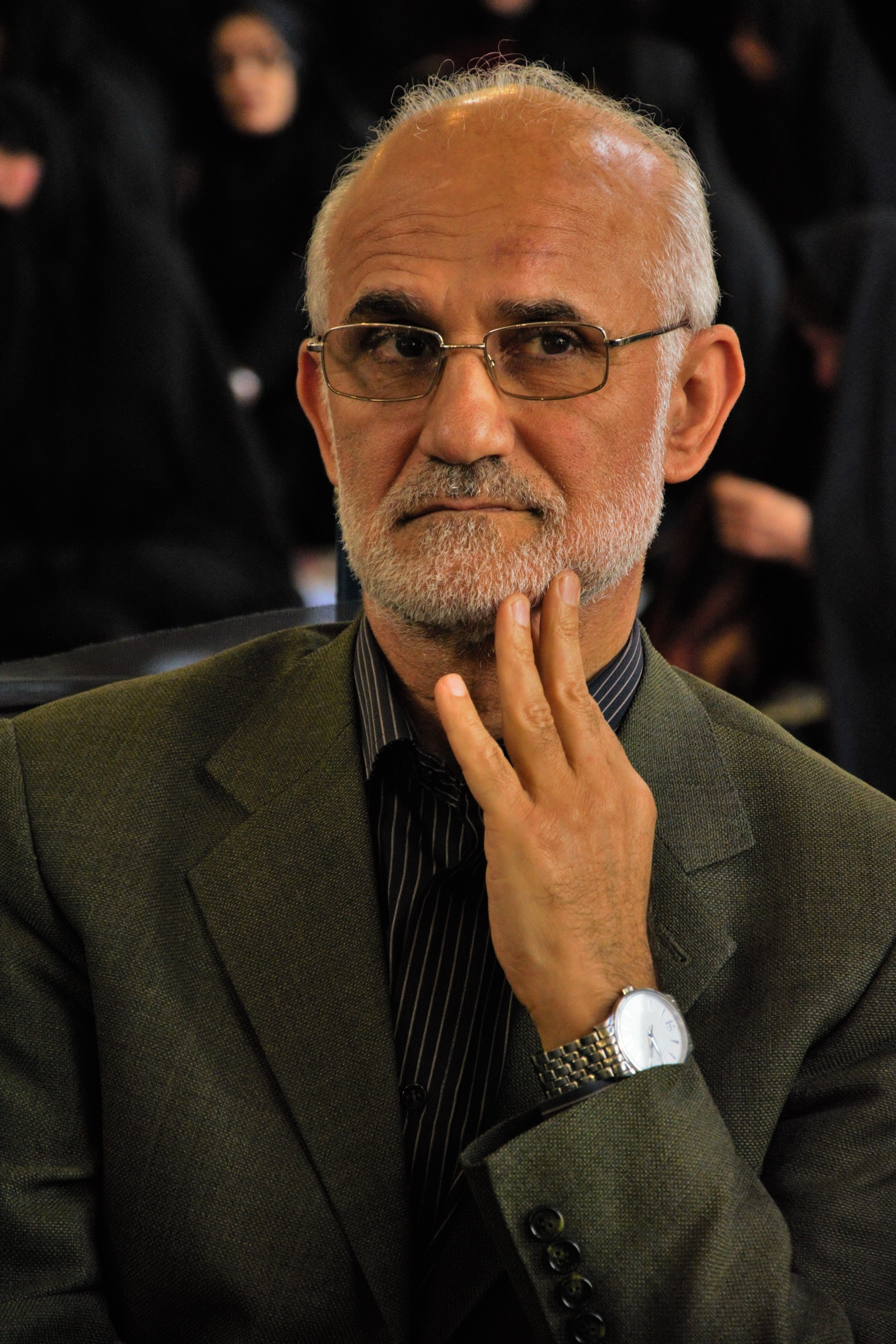
- Moein in 2016

Minister of Science
- In office 20 August 1997 – 23 August 2003
- President: Mohammad Khatami
- Preceded by: Mohammad Reza Hashemi
- Succeeded by: Jafar Towfighi
- In office 29 August 1989 – 16 August 1993
- President: Akbar Hashemi Rafsanjani
- Preceded by: Mohammad Farhadi
- Succeeded by: Mohammad Reza Hashemi

Member of the Parliament of Iran
- In office 24 June 1997 – 19 August 1997
- Constituency: Isfahan
- Majority: 369,062 (61.8%)
- In office 28 May 1988 – 19 August 1989
- Constituency: Tehran, Rey and Shemiranat
- Majority: 598,502 (38%)
- In office 25 January 1983 – 28 May 1984
- Constituency: Shiraz
- Majority: 185,540 (54.5%)

Personal details
- Born: April 1, 1951 (age 75) Isfahan, Iran
- Party: Islamic Iran Participation Front
- Other political affiliations: Islamic Association of Iranian Medical Society Front for Democracy and Human Rights
- Education: Shiraz University of Medical Sciences
- Website: Mostafa Moeen

Mostafa Moeen (Persian: مصطفی معین; born 1 April 1951) is an Iranian politician, professor of pediatrics, and a human rights activist who is currently founder and president of the Front for Human Rights and Democracy in Iran. He was a presidential candidate for the 2005 Iranian presidential election. His campaign enjoyed the support of some reformist parties and organizations, headed by the Islamic Iran Participation Front (IIPF).

Currently, he is the director of Immunology, Asthma and Allergy Research Institute, affiliated with Tehran University of Medical Sciences (TUMS).

== Early life ==
Moeen was born in 1951 in the city of Najaf Abad. At age 18, he was accepted to Shiraz University medical school, and after the Iranian Revolution, he was appointed the president of Shiraz University. He was elected as representative of Shiraz in mid-term elections of the first Parliament of Iran in 1982.

== Ministration term ==
Moeen was the Minister of Culture and Higher Education under President Akbar Hashemi Rafsanjani (1989-1993) and President Mohammad Khatami (1997-2000), and later became the Minister of Science, Research, and Technology (the same post, with a changed name) under President Khatami (2000-2003). As a Minister, Moeen resigned after the student protests of July 1999, and again in July 2003 after he failed to persuade the Council of Guardians to redirect his ministry towards his vision of higher "scientific productivity".

== Presidential ambition ==
On October 12, 2004, Mir-Hossein Mousavi declined to run for the presidency, causing the Islamic Iran Participation Front to consider Moeen instead. IIPF members soon announced his nomination. On December 29, 2004, Moeen agreed to run for the presidency, as the first major candidate to announce his participation.

Contrary to the general expectations and the poll results, Moeen, who was expected to be among the first three most popular candidates in the first round, fared poorly and ranked fifth in the end, with the election resulting in a run-off between Akbar Hashemi Rafsanjani and Mahmoud Ahmadinejad.

Moeen's present campaign was headed by Ali Shakouri-Rad, and he was supported by the following political parties and organizations:

- Islamic Iran Participation Front
- Mojahedin of the Islamic Revolution Organization (sāzmān-e mojāhedin-e enghelāb-e eslāmi)
- Movement for Liberation of Iran (nehzat-e āzādi-e irān)
- Council of National-Religional Forces (shorāy-e niruhāy-e melli mazhabi)
- Islamic Association of the Medical Society (anjoman-e eslāmi-e jāme'e-ye pezeshki)
- Islamic Association of the Teachers (anjoman-e eslāmi-e mo'allemān)
- Islamic Association of University Lecturers (anjoman-e eslāmi-e modarresin-e dāneshgāh-hā)

== Scientific career ==
Mostafa Moin is one of the leading Iranian researchers in the field of pediatric immunology and allergy. He is currently president of a research center affiliated with the Tehran medical school.
