= Islamic Iran Participation Front =

Former political party in Iran

Islamic Iran Participation Front جبهه مشارکت ایران اسلامی
- General Secretary: Mohsen Mirdamadi
- Spokesperson: Hossein Kashefi
- Founded: 5 December 1998; 27 years ago
- Legalised: 19 February 1999; 27 years ago
- Banned: 19 April 2010; 16 years ago
- Headquarters: Tehran
- Newspaper: Mosharekat (Official); Unofficial: Eqbal; Sobh-e Emrooz; Jame'e; Toos; Neshat; Khordad
- Ideology: Reformism (Iranian); Islamic democracy Islamic liberalism
- Political position: Big tent
- Religion: Islam
- National affiliation: Council for coordinating the Reforms Front
- Continental affiliation: International Conference of Asian Political Parties (ICAPP)
- Slogan: Iran for all Iranians
- Spiritual successor: Union of Islamic Iran People Party

The Islamic Iran Participation Front (Persian: جبهه مشارکت ایران اسلامی; Jebheye Mosharekate Iran-e Eslaami) was a reformist political party in Iran. It was sometimes described as the most dominant member within the 2nd of Khordad Front.

The party took 189 of the 290 seats (65%) in the Sixth Majlis.

In the aftermath of the Green Movement protests, its license was revoked and the party was subsequently barred from contesting elections.

== History and profile ==
Founded in late 1998, the main motto of the IIPF is "Iran for all Iranians" (Persian: ایران برای همه ایرانیان). While still backing Islam, the state religion of Iran, the party is among the evangelizers of democracy in Iran. Some members of the front however belong to different factions and ideologies, as described by Saeed Hajjarian it is "the party of between the two Abbas" (Persian: حزب بین‌العباسین, referring to the gap between right-winger Abbas Duzduzani and left-winger Abbas Abdi).

It was led by former Secretary-General of the party, Mohammad Reza Khatami (the brother of Mohammad Khatami, the fifth President of Iran) before the election of Mohsen Mirdamadi as new Secretary-General in 9th congress.

In 2004, Mohammad Reza Khatami, along with other prominent members such as Elaheh Koulaei, Mohsen Mirdamadi, and Ali Shakouri-Rad were barred from standing in the parliament elections by the Council of Guardians.

In spring of 2005, this party supported Mostafa Moin in the presidential election together with its unofficial daily Eqbal which was disestablished in July 2005.

== Members ==
The decision center of the party is the Central Council, which has thirty members. Some of the members include:

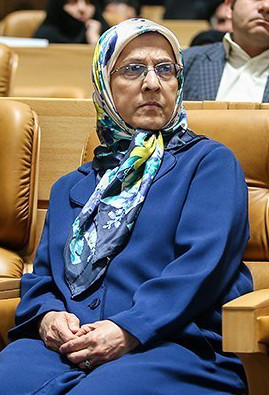
Elaheh Koulaei

- Mohammad Reza Khatami
- Saeed Hajjarian
- Elaheh Koulaei
- Mostafa Tajzadeh
- Mohsen Mirdamadi
- Abdollah Ramezanzadeh
- Safdar Hosseini
- Ali Shakouri-Rad
- Jalal Jalalizadeh
- Ahmad Shirzad
- Hadi Ghabel
- Davoud Soleymani
- Saeed Shirkavand

== Ban ==
Following 2009 post-poll protests, the government suspended the party along with the Mojahedin of the Islamic Revolution of Iran Organization on 19 April 2010. A few weeks later in March, Iranian Judiciary banned the party and closed down its office when it had scheduled to hold its annual meeting. The party called the action "an illegal act". In October, the party declared that Branch 27 of Tehran General Court overturned the decision of the Ministry of Interior's Article 10 Commission, responsible for licensing political parties in Iran. On 27 September 2010, prosecutor-general told press that the party is dissolved and not allowed to have any activities. The party announced it had received no notification of any such court verdict and thus could not be enforced, calling for a chance to appeal. On 4 November 2011, the interior ministry declared that the party is unable to run for parliament seats in the 2012 elections because its license is revoked.

== See also ==
- List of Islamic political parties
