= List of presidents of Iran =

This is a list of the presidents of the Islamic Republic of Iran since the office established in 1980. The president of Iran is the head of government, the second-highest ranking official of Iran, and the highest popularly elected official in the country. The current president, Masoud Pezeshkian has been in office since 28 July 2024 after winning the 2024 presidential election.

== Background ==
After the Iranian Revolution of 1979 and referendum to create the Islamic Republic on March 29 and 30, the new government needed to craft a new constitution. Ayatollah Ruhollah Khomeini ordered an election for the Assembly of Experts, the body tasked with writing the constitution. The assembly presented the constitution on October 24, 1979, and Supreme Leader Ruhollah Khomeini and Prime Minister Mehdi Bazargan approved it. This was also approved in constitutional referendum on December 2 and 3.

The 1979 Constitution designated the supreme leader as the head of state and the president and prime minister as the heads of government. The post of prime minister was abolished after the 1989 constitutional referendum.

The first Iranian presidential election was held on January 25, 1980 and resulted in the election of Abolhassan Banisadr with 76% of the votes. Banisadr was impeached on June 22, 1981 by Parliament. Until the early election on July 24, 1981, the duties of the president were undertaken by the Provisional Presidential Council. Mohammad-Ali Rajai was elected president on July 24, 1981 and took office on August 2. Rajai remained in office for less than one month, with both he and his prime minister being assassinated on August 30, 1981. Once again, a Provisional Presidential Council filled the office until October 13, 1981 when Ali Khamenei was elected president.

Ali Khamenei, Akbar Hashemi Rafsanjani, Mohammad Khatami, Mahmoud Ahmadinejad and Hassan Rouhani were each elected president for two terms. Ebrahim Raisi was the eighth president, serving from his election in 2021 until his death on May 19, 2024 leaving the office occupied in an acting capacity by First Vice President Mohammad Mokhber. Masoud Pezeshkian was elected as the current president on July 6, 2024.

== List of officeholders ==
=== Islamic Republic of Iran (from 1979) ===
| No. | Portrait | Name (Birth–Death) | Term of office | | | Political party | Election | Cabinet | Prime minister | Previous office | Ref. |
| No. | Portrait | Name (Birth–Death) | Took office | Left office | Tenure | Political party | Election | Cabinet | Prime minister | Previous office | Ref. |
Not established but approved (24 October 1979–4 February 1980)
| 1 | | Abolhassan Banisadr سید ابوالحسن بنی‌صدر (1933–2021) | 4 February 1980 | 22 June 1981 | 1 year, 138 days | Independent (OCPP) | 1980 | Rajai | Mohammad-Ali Rajai | Minister of Finance (1979–1980) | |
The Presidential Council performed the presidential duties during the interim (22 June 1981 – 2 August 1981). (Note: Article 131 of The Constitution of the Islamic Republic of Iran: In case of death, dismissal, resignation, absence, or illness lasting longer than two months of the President or when his term in office has ended and a new president has not been elected due to some impediments, or similar other circumstances, his first deputy shall assume, with the approval of the Leader, the powers and functions of the President. The Council, consisting of the Speaker of the Islamic Consultative Assembly, head of the judicial power, and the first deputy of the President, is obliged to arrange for a new President to be elected within a maximum period of fifty days. In case of death of the first deputy to the President, or other matters which prevent him to perform his duties or when the President does not have a first deputy, the Leader shall appoint another person in his place.)
| 2 | | Mohammad-Ali Rajai محمدعلی رجائی (1933–1981) | 2 August 1981 | 30 August 1981 X | 28 days | Islamic Association of Teachers (Note: Also member of the Islamic Republican Party.) | 1981 (Jul) | Bahonar | Mohammad-Javad Bahonar | Prime Minister of Iran (1980–1981) | |
The Presidential Council performed the presidential duties during the interim (30 August 1981 – 9 October 1981).
| 3 | | Ali Khamenei علی خامنه ای (1939–2026) (Note: Also served as Head of the Supreme Defense Council during the Iran-Iraq War.) | 9 October 1981 | 16 August 1989 | 7 years, 311 days | Islamic Republican Party (1979–1987) Combatant Clergy Association (1977–1989) | 1981 (Oct) | Mousavi I | Mir-Hossein Mousavi | Member of the Parliament of Iran (1980–1981) | |
| 3 | | Ali Khamenei علی خامنه ای (1939–2026) | 9 October 1981 | 16 August 1989 | 7 years, 311 days | Islamic Republican Party (1979–1987) Combatant Clergy Association (1977–1989) | 1985 | Mousavi II | Mir-Hossein Mousavi | Member of the Parliament of Iran (1980–1981) | |
The Constitution was amended in 1989, eliminating the post of Prime Minister.
| No. | Portrait | Name (Birth–Death) | Term of office | | | Political party | Election | Cabinet | First vice president(s) | Previous office | Ref. |
| No. | Portrait | Name (Birth–Death) | Took office | Left office | Tenure | Political party | Election | Cabinet | First vice president(s) | Previous office | Ref. |
| 4 | | Akbar Hashemi Rafsanjani اکبر هاشمی رفسنجانی (1934–2017) | 16 August 1989 | 3 August 1997 | 7 years, 352 days | Combatant Clergy Association (1989–1996) Executives of Construction Party (1969–1997) (Note: He was still member of the Combatant Clergy Association, however his membership became inactive.) | 1989 | Rafsanjani I | Hassan Habibi | Speaker of the Parliament of Iran (1980–1989) | |
| 4 | | Akbar Hashemi Rafsanjani اکبر هاشمی رفسنجانی (1934–2017) | 16 August 1989 | 3 August 1997 | 7 years, 352 days | Combatant Clergy Association (1989–1996) Executives of Construction Party (1969–1997) | 1993 | Rafsanjani II | Hassan Habibi | Speaker of the Parliament of Iran (1980–1989) | |
| 5 | | Mohammad Khatami محمد خاتمی (born 1943) | 3 August 1997 | 3 August 2005 | 8 years | Association of Combatant Clerics | 1997 | Khatami I | Hassan Habibi (1997–2001); Mohammad Reza Aref (2001–2005) | Minister of Culture (1982–1992) | |
| 5 | | Mohammad Khatami محمد خاتمی (born 1943) | 3 August 1997 | 3 August 2005 | 8 years | Association of Combatant Clerics | 2001 | Khatami II | Hassan Habibi (1997–2001); Mohammad Reza Aref (2001–2005) | Minister of Culture (1982–1992) | |
| 6 | | Mahmoud Ahmadinejad محمود احمدی‌نژاد (born 1956) | 3 August 2005 | 3 August 2013 | 8 years | Society of Devotees of the Islamic Revolution (Note: He was also member of the Islamic Society of Engineers, however his membership became inactive when he assumed the presidency.) (Alliance of Builders) (Note: The Alliance of Builders of Islamic Iran was a political coalition.) | 2005 | Ahmadinejad I | Parviz Davoodi (2005–2009); Esfandiar Rahim Mashaei (2009); Mohammad-Reza Rahimi (2009–2013) | Mayor of Tehran (2003–2005) | |
| 6 | | Mahmoud Ahmadinejad محمود احمدی‌نژاد (born 1956) | 3 August 2005 | 3 August 2013 | 8 years | Society of Devotees of the Islamic Revolution (Alliance of Builders) | 2009 | Ahmadinejad II | Parviz Davoodi (2005–2009); Esfandiar Rahim Mashaei (2009); Mohammad-Reza Rahimi (2009–2013) | Mayor of Tehran (2003–2005) | |
| 7 | | Hassan Rouhani حسن روحانی (born 1948) | 3 August 2013 | 3 August 2021 | 8 years | Moderation and Development Party | 2013 | Rouhani I | Eshaq Jahangiri | Secretary of the Supreme National Security Council (1989–2005) | |
| 7 | | Hassan Rouhani حسن روحانی (born 1948) | 3 August 2013 | 3 August 2021 | 8 years | Moderation and Development Party | 2017 | Rouhani II | Eshaq Jahangiri | Secretary of the Supreme National Security Council (1989–2005) | |
| 8 | | Ebrahim Raisi ابراهیم رئیسی (1960–2024) | 3 August 2021 | 19 May 2024 ‽ | 2 years, 290 days | Combatant Clergy Association | 2021 | Raisi | Mohammad Mokhber | Chief Justice (2019–2021) | |
| — | | Mohammad Mokhber محمد مخبر (born 1955) acting | 19 May 2024 | 28 July 2024 | 70 days | Independent | — | Raisi (Note: A Temporary Presidential Council consisting of the Acting President, the Speaker of the Assembly, and the Head of Judiciary was formed and a new election date was set for June 28, 2024 with a run-off date of July 5, 2024.) | Himself | Vice President (2021–2024) | |
| 9 | | Masoud Pezeshkian مسعود پزشکیان (born 1954) | 28 July 2024 (Note: He was formally appointed as the president by the supreme leader Ali Khamenei on 28 July 2024, and was sworn in before the Iranian parliament on 30 July.) | Incumbent | 2 years, 71 days | Independent | 2024 | Pezeshkian | Mohammad Reza Aref | Minister of Health and Medical Education (2001–2005) | |

== Presidential age-related data ==
| No. | President | Born | Age at start of presidency | Age at end of presidency | Time in office | Post-presidency timespan | Lifespan | |
| No. | President | Born | Age at start of presidency | Age at end of presidency | Time in office | Post-presidency timespan | Died | Age |
|---|---|---|---|---|---|---|---|---|
| 1 | Abolhassan Banisadr | Mar 22, 1933 | 46 years, 319 days Feb 4, 1980 | 48 years, 92 days Jun 22, 1981 | 1 year, 138 days | 40 years, 109 days | Oct 9, 2021 | 88 years, 201 days |
| 2 | Mohammad-Ali Rajai | Jun 15, 1933 | 48 years, 48 days Aug 2, 1981 | 48 years, 76 days Aug 30, 1981 | 28 days | 0 days (Note: Died in office) | Aug 30, 1981 | 48 years, 76 days |
| 3 | Ali Khamenei | Apr 19, 1939 | 42 years, 173 days Oct 9, 1981 | 50 years, 119 days Aug 16, 1989 | 7 years, 311 days | 36 years, 196 days | Feb 28, 2026 | 86 years, 315 days |
| 4 | Akbar Rafsanjani | Aug 25, 1934 | 54 years, 356 days Aug 16, 1989 | 62 years, 343 days Aug 3, 1997 | 7 years, 352 days | 19 years, 158 days | Jan 8, 2017 | 82 years, 136 days |
| 5 | Mohammad Khatami | Oct 14, 1943 | 53 years, 293 days Aug 3, 1997 | 61 years, 293 days Aug 3, 2005 | 8 years, 0 days | 21 years, 65 days | – | 82 years, 358 days |
| 6 | Mahmoud Ahmadinejad | Oct 28, 1956 | 48 years, 279 days Aug 3, 2005 | 56 years, 279 days Aug 3, 2013 | 8 years, 0 days | 13 years, 65 days | – | 69 years, 344 days |
| 7 | Hassan Rouhani | Nov 12, 1948 | 64 years, 264 days Aug 3, 2013 | 72 years, 264 days Aug 3, 2021 | 8 years, 0 days | 5 years, 65 days | – | 77 years, 329 days |
| 8 | Ebrahim Raisi | Dec 14, 1960 | 60 years, 232 days Aug 3, 2021 | 63 years, 157 days May 19, 2024 | 2 years, 290 days | 0 days (Note: Died in office) | May 19, 2024 | 63 years, 157 days |
| — | Mohammad Mokhber (Acting) | Jun 26, 1955 | 68 years, 328 days May 19, 2024 | 69 years, 32 days Jul 28, 2024 | 70 days | 2 years, 71 days | – | 71 years, 103 days |
| 9 | Masoud Pezeshkian | Sep 29, 1954 | 69 years, 303 days Jul 28, 2024 | (Incumbent) | 2 years, 71 days | (Incumbent) | – | 72 years, 8 days |

== See also ==
- Supreme Leader of Iran
- President of Iran
- List of vice presidents of Iran
- List of heads of state of Iran
- Prime Minister of Iran
  - List of prime ministers of Iran
- List of speakers of the Parliament of Iran
