= Premiership of Mir-Hossein Mousavi =

1981–89 government of Iran

Premiership of Mir-Hossein Mousavi were the third and fourth government of Iran after the Iranian Revolution. At that time, Ali Khamenei was the president.

== Khamenei's Presidency ==
Khamenei was a key figure in the Islamic revolution in Iran and a close confidant of Ayatollah Khomeini.

Khomeini appointed Khamenei to the post of Tehran's Friday prayers in the autumn of 1989, after forced resignation of Grand Ayatollah Hossein-Ali Montazeri from the post, when he criticised Khomeini for torture of prisoners. He served briefly as the Deputy Minister for Defence and as a supervisor of the Islamic Revolutionary Guards. He also went to the battlefield as a representative of the defense commission of the parliament. In June 1981, Khamenei narrowly escaped an assassination attempt when a bomb, concealed in a tape recorder at a press conference, exploded beside him. He was permanently injured, losing the use of his right arm.

Candidate	Votes	%
Ali Khamenei	16,003,242	95.02%
Ali Akbar Parvaresh	342,600	2.03%
Hasan Ghafourifard	78,559	0.47%
Reza Zavare'i	62,133	0.37%
Blank or invalid votes	356,266	2.12%
Total	16,841,800	

In 1981, after the assassination of Mohammad-Ali Rajai, Khamenei was elected President of Iran by a landslide vote in the October 1981 Iranian presidential election and became the first cleric to serve in the office. Ayatollah Khomeini had originally wanted to keep clerics out of the presidency but later changed his views.

In his presidential inaugural address Khamenei vowed to eliminate "deviation, liberalism, and American-influenced leftists". Vigorous opposition to the regime, including nonviolent and violent protest, assassinations, guerrilla activity and insurrections, was answered by state repression and terror in the early 1980s, both before and during Khamenei's presidency. Thousands of rank-and-file members of insurgent groups were killed, often by revolutionary courts. By 1982, the government announced that the courts would be reined in, although various political groups continued to be repressed by the government in the first half of the 1980s.

Khamenei helped guide the country during the Iran–Iraq War in the 1980s, and developed close ties with the now-powerful Revolutionary Guards. As president, he had a reputation of being deeply interested in the military, budget and administrative details. After the Iraqi army was expelled from Iran in 1982, Khamenei became one of the main opponents of Khomeini's decision to counter-invade into Iraq, an opinion Khamenei shared with Prime Minister Mir-Hossein Mousavi, with whom he would later conflict during the 2009 Iranian election protests.

He was re-elected to a second term in 1985, capturing 85.66% of total votes.

== Mousavi's Prime Ministership ==
In August 1981, President Mohammad-Ali Rajai and Prime Minister Mohammad-Javad Bahonar were assassinated in an explosion. Ali Khamenei was then elected as the third president of Iran in the October 1981 Iranian presidential election. He put forward Ali Akbar Velayati as his prime minister, but the Iranian parliament did not give him the vote of confidence, and he was defeated with a vote of 80 to 74. Subsequently, Ali Khamenei, though he had strong disagreements with Mousavi, as a compromise with the left-leaning parliament, agreed to offer him, Mousavi, for the post of premier. On 28 October, the parliament approved Mousavi with a vote of 115 to 39. Mousavi became the 79th prime minister of Iran on 31 October 1981, and remained the prime minister of Iran until 3 August 1989, for eight years.

The conflicts between Mousavi, who belonged to the left wing of the Islamic Republic, with Ali Khamenei (the current leader of Iran), who belonged to the right wing of the Islamic Republic, continued during their eight years of shared governance. However, an escalation in conflicts between the two led to Mousavi's resignation shortly after the end of the Iran–Iraq War in 1988. As the prime minister, Mousavi had the full backing of Ruhollah Khomeini, the supreme leader, and he refused to accept his resignation. Mousavi is remembered as leading a government that did not tolerate dissent.

Mousavi's premiership coincided with the Iran–Iraq War. He guided the country through its war with Iraq, and earned popular acclaim for his stewardship of the national economy. He pioneered a bond-based economy, which many believe was responsible for a fair distribution of goods among the people throughout the Iran–Iraq War.

Many analysts praise his handling of Iran's economy, his civil and economic leadership during the Iran–Iraq War, and his efforts to end Iran's international isolation. Others remember him as being "unpredictable" and less able to navigate Iran's labyrinthine political system than were his rivals. In 1986, Mousavi was not involved in the Iran–Contra affair and secret negotiations and dealing with USA on helping them free the American hostages in Lebanon, in return for sale of the American weapons and spare-parts that Iran's army badly needed for Iran–Iraq War.

Shortly after the end of Iran–Iraq War on 20 August 1988, Ruhollah Khomeini died, and Ali Khamenei was elected as the new Supreme Leader by the Assembly of Experts. Following his death, Mousavi and his fellow left-wingers lost their main source of support within the establishment.

During the parliament hearing on post-war reconstruction plans, Mousavi had heated arguments with Ali Akbar Hashemi Rafsanjani, the speaker of Iran's parliament at the time, over Rafsanjani's suggestion that Iran accept the offer of western countries to help with post-war reconstruction.

On 28 July 1989, the constitution was amended and approved by Iranian voters in a national referendum with a 97% yes vote. At this time, Mehdi Karrubi had been elected as the new speaker of the parliament, to whom the amended constitution was declared. According to one of the amendments, the prime minister's position was abolished.

Hashemi Rafsanjani was also elected as the fourth president of Iran on 28 July 1989 and became the president on 3 August 1989. Mousavi's premiership, ended on the same date. He was the 79th and the last prime minister of Iran, since the constitutional revolution in 1906.

Mousavi was not invited to be a participant in the new government headed by Rafsanjani, and disappeared from the public sphere.

== Cabinet members ==
=== First Cabinet ===
Ministry	Minister
President	Ali Khamenei
Prime Minister	Mir-Hossein Mousavi
Agriculture	Mohammad Salamati
Commerce	Habibollah Asgaroladi
Post	Morteza Nabavi
Culture and Islamic Guidance	Abdol-Majid Moadikhah
Defense and Armed Forces Logistics	Mohammad Salimi
Economy and Financial Affairs	Hossein Namazi
Education	Ali Akbar Parvaresh
Energy	Hossein Ghaforifard
Foreign Affairs	Ali Akbar Velayati
Health and Medical Education	Hadi Manafi
Housing and Urban Development	Mohammad Shahab Gonabadi
Industries and Mines	Mostafa Hashemi
Intelligence	Mohammad Reyshahri
Interior	Kamaldin Nikravesh
Justice	Mohammad Asqari
Labour and Social Affairs	Ahmad Tavakkoli
Petroleum	Mohammad Gharazi
Roads and Transportation	Mohammad Hadi Nejad Hosseinian
Science, Research, and Technology	Mohammad-Ali Najafi

=== Second Cabinet ===
Ministry	Minister
President	Ali Khamenei
Prime Minister	Mir-Hossein Mousavi
Agriculture	Abass-Ali Zali
Commerce	Hossein Abedi Jafari
Post	Mohammad Gharazi
Culture and Islamic Guidance	Mohammad Khatami
Defense and Armed Forces Logistics	Mohammad Hossein Jalali
Economy and Financial Affairs	Hossein Namazi
Education	Kazem Akrami
Energy	Mohammad-Taqi Banki
Foreign Affairs	Ali Akbar Velayati
Health and Medical Education	Alireza Marandi
Housing and Urban Development	Serajoldin Kazeroni
Industries and Mines	Behzad Nabavi
Intelligence	Mohammadi Reyshahri
Interior	Ali Akbar Mohtashamipur
Justice	Hassan Habibi
Labour and Social Affairs	Abolghasem Sarhadizade
Petroleum	Gholam Reza Aghazadeh
Roads and Transportation	Mohammad Saeedikia
Science, Research, and Technology	Mohammad Farhadi
