= Iranian presidential election =

The President of Iran is the highest official elected by direct, popular vote, although the President carries out the decrees, and answers to the Supreme Leader of Iran, who functions as the country's head of state. Chapter IX of the Constitution of the Islamic Republic of Iran sets forth the qualifications for presidential candidates. Powers of the presidency include signing treaties and other agreements with foreign countries and international organizations, with Supreme Leader's approval; administering national planning, budget, and state employment affairs, as decreed by the Supreme Leader. The President also appoints the ministers, subject to the approval of Parliament.

Candidates have to be vetted by the Guardian Council, a twelve-member body consisting of six clerics (selected by Iran's Supreme Leader), and six lawyers (proposed by the head of Iran's judicial system and voted in by the Parliament).

The Guardian Council interprets the term supervision in Article 99 as "approbation supervision" (Persian: نظارت استصوابی) which implies the right for acceptance or rejection of elections legality and candidates competency. This interpretation is in contrast with the idea of "notification supervision" (Persian: نظارت استطلاعی) which does not imply the mentioned approval right. The "evidentiary supervision" (Persian: نظارت استنادی), which requires evidences for acceptance or rejection of elections legality and candidates competency, is another interpretation of mentioned article.

Iranian presidential election
Elections	Date	Eligible voters	Number of votes	Voter Turnout Percentage	Number of candidates	Winner	Number of Votes for Winner	Percentage of Vote
1st election	25 January 1980	20,993,643	14,152,907	67.41	124	Abolhassan Banisadr	10,709,330	75.6
2nd election	24 July 1981	22,687,017	14,572,493	64.24	4	Mohammad-Ali Rajai	12,960,619	91.0
3rd election	2 October 1981	22,687,017	16,847,715	74.26	4	Ali Khamenei	16,007,072	97.01
4th election	16 August 1985	25,993,802	14,238,587	54.78	3	Ali Khamenei	12,203,870	87.09
5th election	28 July 1989	30,139,598	16,452,562	54.59	2	Akbar Hashemi Rafsanjani	15,537,394	96.01
6th election	11 June 1993	33,156,055	16,796,755	50.66	4	Akbar Hashemi Rafsanjani	10,449,933	64.0
7th election	23 May 1997	36,466,487	29,145,745	79.92	4	Mohammad Khatami	20,078,187	69.06
8th election	8 June 2001	42,170,230	28,155,969	66.77	10	Mohammad Khatami	21,659,053	77.01
9th election	17 June 2005	46,786,418	27,958,931	59.76	2	Mahmoud Ahmadinejad	17,284,782	61.69
10th election	12 June 2009	46,199,997	39,371,214	84.83	4	Mahmoud Ahmadinejad	24,592,793	62.63
11th election	14 June 2013	50,483,192	36,821,538	72.94	6	Hassan Rouhani	18,692,500	50.71
12th election	19 May 2017	56,410,234	41,366,085	73.33	4	Hassan Rouhani	23,636,652	57.14
13th election	18 June 2021	59,310,307	28,933,004	48.8	4	Ebrahim Raisi	17,926,345	61.9
14th election	28 June 2024 "runoff"	61,452,321	24,535,185	39.96	4	Masoud Pezeshkian & Saeed Jalili		
14th election	5 July 2024 "Second Round"	61,452,321	30,530,157	49.8	2	Masoud Pezeshkian	16,384,403	53,6
