= Mostafa Mir-Salim 2017 presidential campaign =

- Campaign: 2017 Iranian presidential election
- Candidate: Mostafa Mir-Salim
- Affiliation: Islamic Coalition Party
- Status: Announced: 16 December 2016; Registered: 11 April 2017; Lost the election: 20 May 2017
- Headquarters: Tehran, Iran
- Key people: Mohammad Ali Amani (Chairman)
- Slogan(s): Reality and Integrity راستی و درستی

Website
- mirsalim.com/

Mostafa Mir-Salim was named as Islamic Coalition Party's nominee for 2017 Iranian presidential election in December 2016. He launched his campaign in April 2017.

== Provincial visits ==
Province	Date	Ref
Mazandaran	24 April	
Kerman	15 May	
East Azerbaijan	15 May	

== Political positions ==
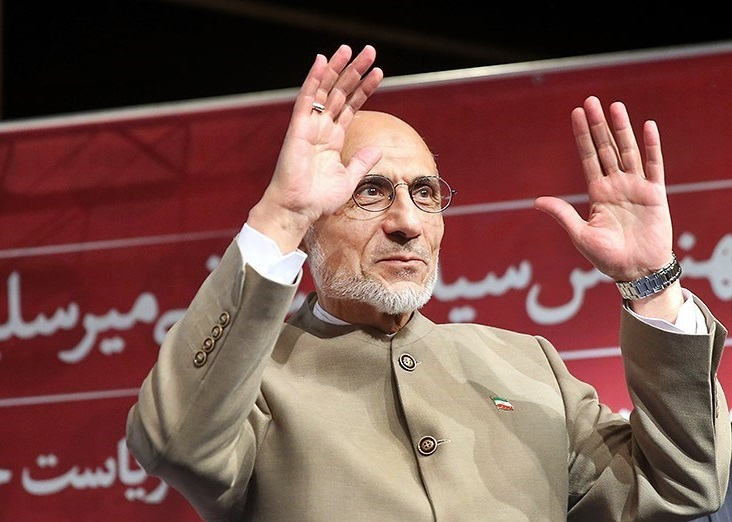
Mostafa Mirsalim at Tehran rally

=== Foreign policy ===
In the first step visited DESA (company). In a speech at Mazandaran University, Mir-Salim said “Diplomatically speaking, we should have further engagement with the neighboring states such as Afghanistan, Turkey and Qatar because we have common interests with the neighbors which can be met through engagement and consultation”. He also stated that Iran has been committed to the Joint Comprehensive Plan of Action, while other parties “failed to completely fulfill all its commitments”. He blamed the incumbent government for not using the opportunity of nuclear deal, noting that he will use the opportunity to develop exports.

== Endorsements ==
=== Parties ===
- Islamic Coalition Party

=== Individuals ===
- Asadollah Badamchian
