= Asgaroladi =

Asgaroladdi (Persian: عسگراولادی) is an Iranian surname. Notable people with the surname include:

- Asadollah Asgaroladi (1934–2019), Iranian businessman
- Habibollah Asgaroladi (1932–2013), Iranian politician
