= Abdulrahim Soleymani =

Iranian Shia cleric and religious scholar

Abdolrahim Soleymani Ardastani (Persian: عبدالرحیم سلیمانی اردستانی) is a religious studies researcher and political prisoner. He is a retired professor at Mofid University and a former member of the Assembly of Seminary Teachers and Researchers of Qom.

He was also detained for a period during the 2009 protests.

== Biography ==
Abdolrahim Soleymani Ardastani is a religious studies researcher, a retired professor at Mofid University, and a former member of the Assembly of Seminary Teachers and Researchers of Qom.

=== Detention in 2009 ===
He was detained for a period during the 2009 protests.

=== Summons and questioning ===
In 2024, Soleymani Ardastani was summoned to the prosecutor’s office at least twice and questioned.

=== Detention in 2026 ===
Following a debate session between Soleymani Ardastani and Hamed Kashani in Farvardin 1405 (March–April 2026), during which they expressed particular viewpoints, Soleymani Ardastani was violently arrested at the home of one of his relatives.Mohammad-Ali Amani, Secretary-General of the Islamic Coalition Party, called for legal action against him and his removal from clerical status following some of his remarks. He faced charges including disturbing public opinion and engaging in propaganda activities, insulting religious sanctities and religious authorities, insulting officials, gathering to protest house arrest, assembly and collusion, tarnishing the reputation of the clergy, sectarianism, and mind control.

News agencies confirmed in Khordad 1405 (May–June 2026) that the court had sentenced him to six years in prison, a fine, and removal from clerical status on eight counts. He will serve his prison sentence at Langroud Prison in Qom.

== Controversies ==
In an online program, Soleymani Ardastani discussed the circumstances surrounding Fatima al-Zahra’s death and the mistreatment she allegedly suffered after Muhammad’s death. He pointed to inconsistencies in the accounts and their conflict with Ali’s justice, effectively questioning the traditionally accepted Shiite account of her “martyrdom.” Soleymani Ardastani had raised questions and doubts about the details of the narrations concerning the attack on Fatima al-Zahra’s house. Following criticism of his interpretation, a number of scholars and clerics expressed their willingness to respond to these doubts in a debate.

In a debate with Hamed Kashani, Soleymani Ardastani also presented a more lenient view of Abu Bakr’s conduct toward his opponents and rejected certain narrations concerning the execution or killing of dissenters, provoking a strong reaction from some clerics and religious activists. Toward the end of the debate, Soleymani Ardastani stated: “I said I would not enter into the historical discussion, and I did not make any definitive statements.” This statement appears at the 2:54 mark in the recorded video. Most media outlets close to the establishment and traditional religious circles portrayed Hamed Kashani as the “winner” of the debate and depicted Soleymani Ardastani as having fallen short in his arguments and religious citations. A cleric named Alireza Sanjari Araki stated that anyone who “knowingly and explicitly” denies the “martyrdom of Lady Fatima al-Zahra” has “departed from the principles of Shiite Islam and is subject to a ruling of disbelief or apostasy.”

In response to criticism of his positions in the debate with Hamed Kashani, Abdolrahim Soleymani Ardastani wrote on his Telegram channel: “I am not an enemy of the revered Zahra; rather, I am devoted to her. I believe her status is so exalted that even martyrdom cannot elevate it further. I have denied none of this lady’s status. I have questioned the story told by eulogists and religious mourners, and this is a scholarly discussion in which the possibility of error exists.”

During the same debate, he also stated that Muhammad Taqi had been killed because of his wife’s “jealousy” following his remarriage, adding that mourning this event was meaningless. This claim subsequently attracted considerable attention and criticism. Some regarded it as an insult to the status of the Imamate in Shiite Islam and even declared him an infidel.

== See also ==
- 1981–1982 Iran massacres
- Shia opposition to the Islamic Republic of Iran
- Islamic extremism
- Human rights in the Islamic Republic of Iran
- Society of Seminary Teachers of Qom
