= First premiership of Mir-Hossein Mousavi =

First Cabinet of Mousavi
- 3rd Cabinet of the Islamic Republic of Iran

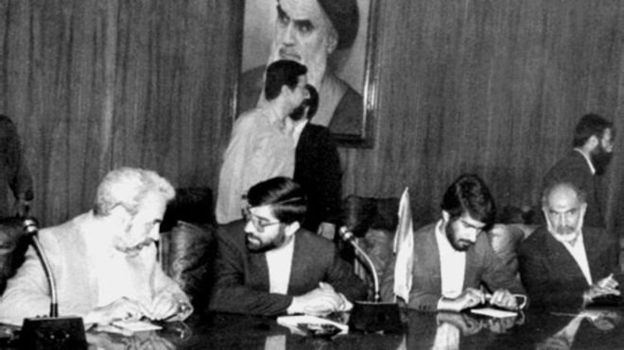
- Mir-Hossein Mousavi's meeting with cabinet members
- Date formed: 2 November 1981
- Date dissolved: 28 October 1985

People and organisations
- Head of state: Ruhollah Khomeini
- Head of government: Mir-Hossein Mousavi
- Member parties: Islamic Republican Party; Mojahedin of the Islamic Revolution Organization; Combatant Clergy Association
- Status in legislature: Majority

History
- Predecessor: Mahdavi-Kani
- Successor: Mousavi II

== History ==
=== Background ===
Before 1989, the Constitution of the Islamic Republic of Iran provided that head of government was the Prime Minister, nominated by the President and approved by the Parliament. The Islamic Republican Party (IRP) which together with its Khomeinist allies had seized power and ousted all opponents, held an uncontested and single-party presidential election in October 1981 and got its candidate Ali Khamenei elected. The party also held the majority in the parliament.

=== Formation ===
President Ali Khamenei who belonged to the right-wing faction of the IRP, was willing to nominate his like-minded as the head of government.

=== Reshuffles ===
In Summer 1983 two pro-market ministers, Asgaroladi and Tavakoli, left the cabinet following months of disagreements behind the scenes. On 5 August 1984, Mousavi got a vote of confidence again and proposes a list of ministers to the parliament. Ten days later they were vetted, resulting to rejection of five.

== Cabinet members ==
| Portfolio | Minister | Took office | Left office | Party |
|---|---|---|---|---|
| Prime Minister | Mir-Hossein Mousavi | 29 October 1981 | 24 October 1985 | IRP |
Ministers
| Foreign Minister | Mir-Hossein Mousavi (head of ministry) | 2 November 1981 | 15 December 1981 | IRP |
| Foreign Minister | Ali Akbar Velayati | 15 December 1981 | 28 October 1985 | IRP |
| Interior Minister | Kamal Nikravesh | 2 November 1981 | 14 January 1982 | IRP |
| Interior Minister | Ali Akbar Nategh-Nouri | 14 January 1982 | 28 October 1985 | CCA |
| Defense Minister | Mohammad Salimi | 2 November 1981 | 16 August 1984 | Military |
| Defense Minister | Mohammad-Reza Rahimi (head of ministry) | 16 August 1984 | 20 August 1984 | Military |
| Defense Minister | Mir-Hossein Mousavi (head of ministry) | 20 August 1984 | 28 October 1985 | IRP |
| Education Minister | Ali-Akbar Parvaresh | 2 November 1981 | 16 August 1984 | IRP |
| Education Minister | Mohammad-Taghi Moayad (head of ministry) | 16 August 1984 | 20 August 1984 | IRP |
| Education Minister | Mir-Hossein Mousavi (head of ministry) | 20 August 1984 | 18 October 1984 | IRP |
| Education Minister | Kazem Akrami | 18 October 1984 | 28 October 1985 | IRP |
| Islamic Guidance Minister | Abdolmajid Moadikhah | 2 November 1981 | 14 August 1984 | IRP |
| Islamic Guidance Minister | Mohammad Khatami | 14 August 1984 | 28 October 1985 | CCA |
| Commerce Minister | Habibollah Asgaroladi | 2 November 1981 | 28 August 1983 | IRP |
| Commerce Minister | Hassan Abedi-Jafari | 28 August 1983 | 28 October 1985 | IRP |
| Petroleum Minister | Mohammad Gharazi | 2 November 1981 | 28 October 1985 | Nonpartisan |
| Health Minister | Hadi Manafi | 2 November 1981 | 2 November 1981 | IRP |
| Health Minister | Alireza Marandi (head of ministry) | 16 August 1984 | 20 August 1984 | IRP |
| Health Minister | Alireza Marandi | 20 August 1984 | 28 October 1985 | IRP |
| Post Minister | Morteza Nabavi | 2 November 1981 | 28 October 1985 | IRP |
| Housing Minister | Mohammad-Shahab Gonabadi | 2 November 1981 | 15 August 1984 | Mojahedin of the Islamic Revolution Organization |
| Housing Minister | Serajeddin Kazerouni | 15 August 1984 | 28 October 1985 | IRP |
| Mines and Metals Minister | Hossein Mousaviani | 2 November 1981 | 14 August 1984 | IRP |
| Mines and Metals Minister | Hossein Nili | 14 August 1984 | 28 October 1985 | IRP |
| Higher Education Minister | Mohammad-Ali Najafi | 2 November 1981 | 20 August 1984 | Nonpartisan |
| Higher Education Minister | Iradj Fazel | 20 August 1984 | 28 October 1985 | Nonpartisan |
| Justice Minister | Mohammad Asghari | 2 November 1981 | 15 August 1984 | IRP |
| Justice Minister | Hassan Habibi | 15 August 1984 | 28 October 1985 | IRP |
| Agricultural Minister | Mohammad Salamati | 2 November 1981 | 14 August 1984 | Mojahedin of the Islamic Revolution Organization |
| Agricultural Minister | Abbas-Ali Zali | 14 August 1984 | 28 October 1985 | IRP |
| Roads Minister | Hadi Nejad-Hosseinian | 3 September 1981 | 12 March 1985 | IRP |
| Roads Minister | Alinaghi Khamoushi (head of ministry) | 12 March 1985 | 28 October 1985 | IRP |
| Industries Minister | Mostafa Hashemitaba | 2 November 1981 | 20 August 1984 | Nonpartisan |
| Industries Minister | Mohammad-Ali Zaker (head of ministry) | 16 August 1984 | 20 August 1984 | IRP |
| Industries Minister | Gholamreza Shafeei | 20 August 1984 | 28 October 1985 | IRP |
| Labour Minister | Ahmad Tavakoli | 2 November 1981 | 28 August 1983 | Mojahedin of the Islamic Revolution Organization |
| Labour Minister | Abolghasem Sarhaddizadeh | 28 August 1983 | 28 October 1985 | IRP |
| Energy Minister | Hassan Ghafourifard | 2 November 1981 | 28 October 1985 | IRP |
| Finance Minister | Hossein Namazi | 2 November 1981 | 28 October 1985 | IRP |
| Heavy Industries Minister | Behzad Nabavi | 31 May 1982 | 28 October 1985 | Mojahedin of the Islamic Revolution Organization |
| Revolutionary Guards Minister | Mohsen Rafighdoost | 9 November 1982 | 28 October 1985 | Military |
| Construction Minister | Bijan Namdar Zanganeh | 20 February 1984 | 28 October 1985 | Nonpartisan |
| Intelligence Minister | Mohammad Reyshahri | 15 August 1984 | 28 October 1985 | Nonpartisan |
Ministers without portfolio
| Plan and Budget Organization | Mohammad-Taghi Banki | 2 November 1981 | 28 October 1985 | IRP |
| Executive Affairs | Behzad Nabavi | 2 November 1981 | 31 May 1982 | Mojahedin of the Islamic Revolution Organization |
| Executive Affairs | Gholam-Reza Aghazadeh | 31 May 1982 | 28 October 1985 | IRP |
| State Welfare Organization | Mahmoud Rouhani | 2 November 1981 | 28 October 1985 | IRP |

Cabinet of Iran
| Preceded by Interim Government of Mahdavi Kani | First Government of Mousavi; 1981–1985 | Succeeded by Second Government of Mousavi |
