= Saeed Amani =

Iranian politician

- سعید امانی
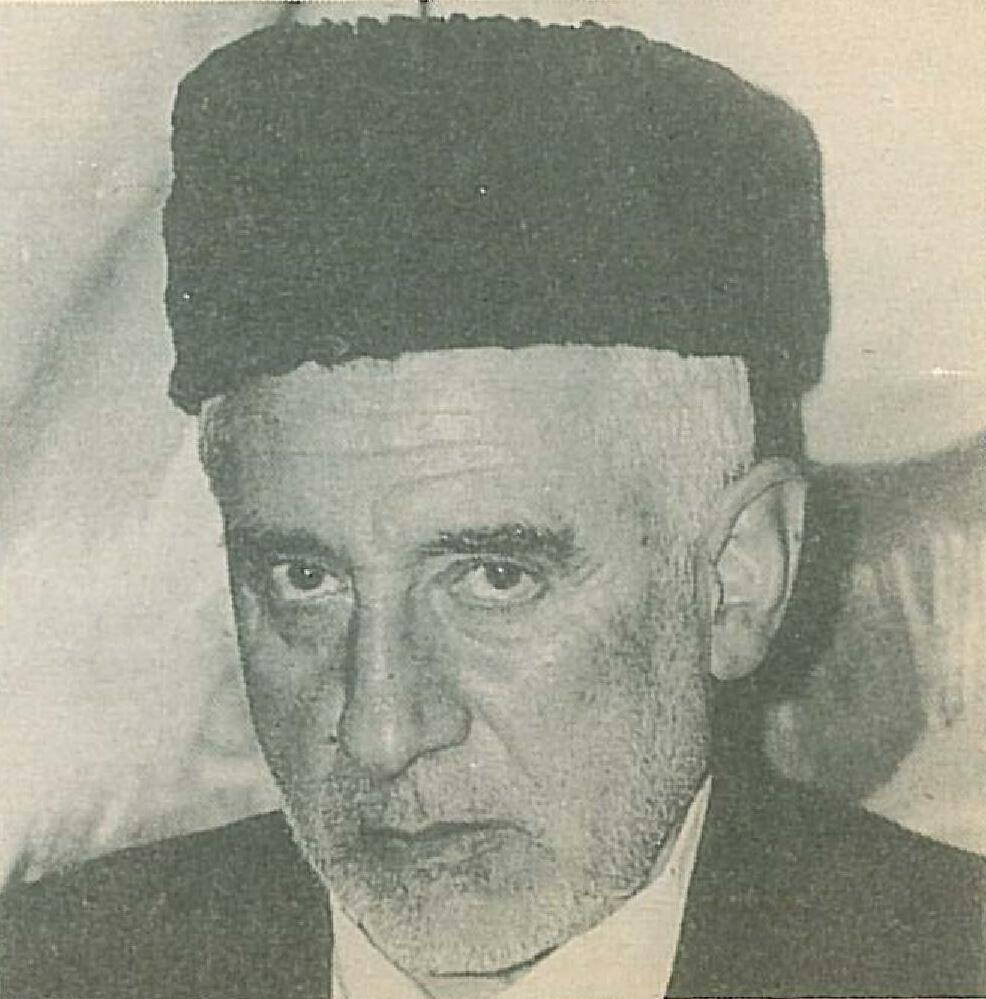

Member of Parliament of Iran
- In office 24 August 1981 – 28 May 1988
- Constituency: Tehran, Rey and Shemiranat
- Majority: 1,379,655 (74.2%)

Personal details
- Born: Saeed Amani Hamedani; 1915 Hamadan, Iran
- Died: 19 February 2002 (aged 87)
- Party: Islamic Coalition Party
- Other political affiliations: Islamic Republican Party (1979–1987)
- Children: Mohammad-Ali Amani
- Relatives: Asadollah Badamchian (nephew)
- Occupation: Businessman

Saeed Amani Hamedani (Persian: سعید امانی همدانی; 1915 – 19 February 2002) was an Iranian bazaari merchant and conservative politician.

He was a senior member of the Islamic Coalition Party, as well as a central council member of Islamic Republican Party.

He was a member of the Supervisory Council of the Guild Affairs and secretary-general of the Union of Islamic Associations of Guilds and Bazaaris. He held the latter office until 2001.

Honorary titles
Preceded by Yadollah Sahabi	Aging Speaker of the Parliament of Iran; 2nd term	Succeeded by Mohammad-Hossein Chehregani
