= Abdolreza Hashemzaei =

Iranian politician

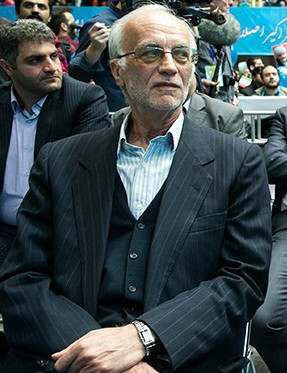

Member of the Parliament of Iran
- In office 28 May 2016 – 26 May 2020
- Constituency: Tehran, Rey, Shemiranat and Eslamshahr
- Majority: 1,078,817 (33.22%)
- In office 28 May 1984 – 28 May 1988
- Preceded by: Esmaeil Ferdosipour
- Succeeded by: Mohammad Reza Tavssoli
- Constituency: Ferdos and Tabas
- Majority: 31,887 (65.1%)

Personal details
- Born: Abdolreza Hashemzaei Nahbandan c. 1944 (age 81–82) Nain, Iran
- Party: Executives of Construction Party

Abdolreza Hashemzaei (Persian: عبدالرضا هاشمزایی) is an Iranian reformist politician who was a member of the Parliament of Iran representing Tehran, Rey, Shemiranat and Eslamshahr electoral district, from 2016 to 2020. He formerly represented Ferdos and Tabas County.

== Career ==
Hashemzaei was a senior manager in the Minister of Power and advisor to Minister of Industries.

=== Electoral history ===
Year	Election	Votes	%	Rank	Notes
1984	Parliament	31,887	65.1	1st	Won
2016	Parliament	1,078,817	33.22	30th	Won

Honorary titles
Preceded by Alireza Marandi	Aging Speaker of the Parliament of Iran; 10th term	Succeeded by Mostafa Mirsalim
