= Asadollah Asgaroladi =

Iranian businessman

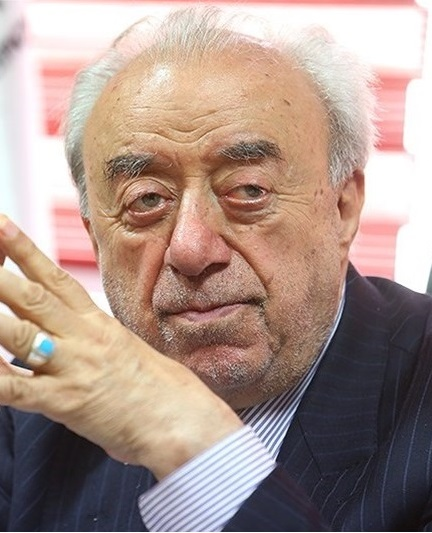
- Born: March 6, 1934; Tehran, Iran
- Died: September 13, 2019 (aged 85); Tehran, Iran
- Occupation: Businessman
- Political party: Islamic Coalition Party
- Children: 5
- Relatives: Habibollah Asgaroladi (brother)

Asadollah Asgaroladi (Persian: اسدالله عسگراولادی; 3 March 1934 – 13 September 2019) was an Iranian businessman with business interests in exports and real estate.

== Life ==
Asgaroladi was born to a merchant family. His ancestors converted from Judaism to Shia Islam. Asgaroladi was amongst the world's wealthiest Iranians, and was named the third richest Iranian in the world and was the wealthiest single individual in Iran, with an estimated wealth in excess of $10 billion. His business empire dates back to the 1970s and, since then, Asgaroladi became one of the leading exporters of dried fruits, nuts and spices from Iran. Asgaroladi was the president of Hasas Co. which is the leading exporter of nuts and pistachios from Iran since 1953. Asgaroladi is a philanthropist who has shared his wealth generously supporting many humanitarian causes, notably constructing hospitals, health centres, schools and mosques.

Asgaroladi increased his wealth dramatically in the 90's when there were two official exchange rates for the US dollar. Those with trade license could obtain the lower exchange rate of 1750 rials but the market value of US dollars was at 8000 rials. During this period his brother Habibollah Asgaroladi was the commerce minister responsible for handing out trade licenses to obtain the lower exchange rate. He used his connections to obtain large quantities of US dollars at low exchange rate and resold them at the market value price for a profit of more than 300%. Habibollah Asgaroladi ran for the presidency of Iran twice and later became party leader of the Islamic Coalition Party, the lead executive of the Social Security Organisation, and the president of the Imam Khomeini Relief Foundation.

Asgaroladi was a well known member of the Iranian business community (his brother was the Minister of Commerce for many years) and he held the Presidency of several international Chambers of Commerce including the Iran-China, Iran-Australia, Iran-Russia and Iran-Canada Chambers of Commerce. He ran as a candidate for Mayor of Tehran in 2017 and has played an active role in politics as one of the government's most senior economic policy advisors. Asgaroladi has been a strong campaigner for equal rights for women and his own daughters are entrepreneurs and doctors.

Asgaroladi was reported as being in negotiations to purchase Iran Air, Iran's flag carrier airline for $3 billion USD, and was quoted in media sources as wishing to acquire the Tehran International Trade and Exhibition Centre, a vast sprawling conference and exhibition centre in northern Tehran. He also owns a majority stake in three Chinese retail banks. Asgaroladi on numerous occasions proposed setting up an Iran-China bank.

According to Forbes Magazine, Asgaroladi was the secret business partner of Swiss-based US-Israeli billionaire and fugitive Marc Rich in helping to bypass U.S. sanctions against Iran after the Iranian revolution.

On 13 September 2019, Asgaroladi died because of a brain injury. His 3 daughters and two sons have pledged to continue support of their father's philanthropic causes and financial donations from his foundation.
