= Hamidreza Taraghi =

- حمیدرضا ترقی
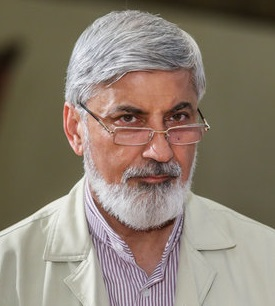

Member of the Parliament of Iran
- In office 28 May 1996 – 28 May 2000
- Constituency: Mashhad and Kalat
- Majority: 254,478 (54.4%)

Personal details
- Born: c. 1955 (age 70–71) Neishabur, Iran
- Party: Islamic Coalition Party

Hamidreza Taraghi (Persian: حمیدرضا ترقی) is an Iranian bazaari merchant and conservative politician who served a member of the Parliament of Iran from 1996 to 2000 Mashhad and Kalat electoral district.

Taraghi formerly headed Islamic Coalition Party's bureau for international affairs.

Party political offices
Preceded by Asadollah Badamchian	Head of the Islamic Coalition Party's Political Bureau; 2004–2006	Succeeded by Mohammad-Kazem Anbarlouei
New title	International Deputy of Islamic Coalition Party; 2006–2016	Succeeded by Mehdi Soli
Preceded by Mostafa Mir-Salim	Deputy Head of the Islamic Coalition Party's Central Council; 2019–present	Incumbent
