= Asadollah Badamchian =

Iranian politician

- اسدالله بادامچیان
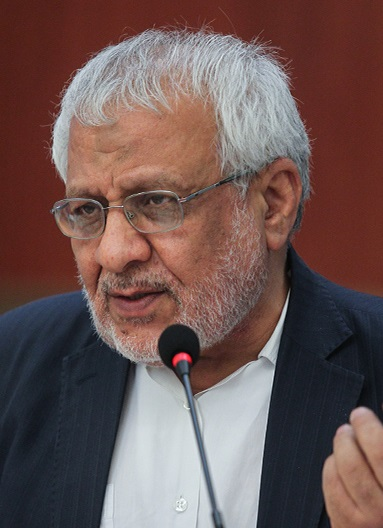

Secretary-General of the Islamic Coalition Party
- In office 29 January 2019 – 26 January 2025
- Preceded by: Mohammad-Nabi Habibi
- Succeeded by: Mohammad-Ali Amani

Spokesperson of the Islamic Coalition Party
- Incumbent
- Assumed office Unknown

Political Deputy to the Head of the Judiciary
- In office 5 January 1989 – Unknown
- President: Ali Khamenei; Akbar Hashemi Rafsanjani
- Minister: Abdul-Karim Mousavi Ardebili; Mohammad Yazdi
- Leader: Ruhollah Khomeini; Ali Khamenei

Member of the Parliament of Iran
- In office 28 May 2008 – 28 May 2012
- Constituency: Tehran, Rey, Shemiranat and Eslamshahr
- Majority: 436,611 (25.80%)
- In office 28 May 1984 – 28 May 1988
- Constituency: Tehran, Rey, Shemiranat and Eslamshahr
- Majority: 1,251,160 (39.10%)

Deputy Secretary-General of the Islamic Coalition Party
- In office 2001–2012
- Preceded by: Ali Akbar Parvaresh
- Succeeded by: Mohammad-Ali Amani

Personal details
- Born: December 22, 1942 (age 83) Tehran, Iran
- Party: Islamic Coalition Party
- Other political affiliations: Islamic Republican Party (1979–1987)
- Relatives: Saeed Amani (uncle)

Asadollah Badamchian (Persian: اسدالله بادامچیان, born 22 December 1942 in Tehran) is an Iranian journalist and conservative and principlist politician who was a member of the parliament for two terms. He is also one of the founders of Islamic Coalition Party, currently serving as the spokesperson for the party. He was also managing-director of Shoma newspaper.

Party political offices
Unknown	Executive Secretary of the Islamic Coalition Party ?–2001	Succeeded by Mohammad Nabi Habibi
Unknown	Head of the Islamic Coalition Party's Political Bureau ?–2004	Succeeded by Hamidreza Taraghi
Preceded by Mohammad Nabi Habibi	Deputy Secretary-General of the Islamic Coalition Party; 2004–2012	Succeeded by Mohammad-Ali Amani
New title	Deputy Head of the Islamic Coalition Party's Central Council; 2012–2018	Succeeded by Mostafa Mir-Salim
Preceded by Mostafa Mir-Salim	Head of the Islamic Coalition Party's Central Council; 2018–2019	Succeeded by Mostafa Mir-Salim
Preceded by Mohammad Nabi Habibi	Secretary-General of the Islamic Coalition Party; 2019–present	Incumbent
