= Mohammad-Kazem Anbarlouei =

Iranian politician

- Born: January 28, 1957 (age 69)
- Political party: Islamic Coalition Party (1987–); Islamic Republican Party (1979–87)

Mohammad-Kazem Anbarlouei (Persian: محمدکاظم انبارلویی) is an Iranian conservative politician and journalist.

He was a former editor-in-chief of the right-wing Resalat newspaper.

Anbarlouei is a senior member of the Islamic Coalition Party and held office as head of its political bureau.

Media offices
Preceded by Mohammad Sarafraz	Editor-in-Chief of Resalat; 1997–2017	Succeeded by Masoud Pirhadi
Party political offices
Preceded by Hamidreza Taraghi	Head of the Islamic Coalition Party's Political Bureau; 2006–2016	Succeeded by Saleh Eskandari as Political deputy
Preceded by Saleh Eskandari	Political deputy of Islamic Coalition Party; 2019–present	Incumbent
