= Mohammad-Nabi Habibi =

Iranian politician (1945–2019)

- محمدنبی حبیبی
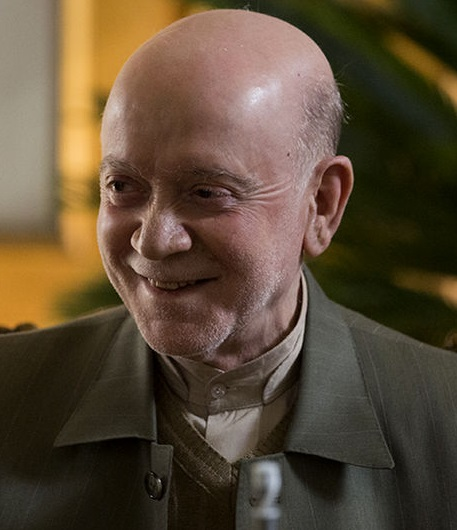

Mayor of Tehran
- In office January 1984 – December 1987
- Appointed by: Ali Akbar Nategh-Nouri
- Preceded by: Hossein Bonakdar (acting)
- Succeeded by: Morteza Tabatabaei (acting)

Governor of Tehran Province
- In office 1982–1983
- President: Ali Khamenei
- Preceded by: Hassan Hajilari
- Succeeded by: Hossein Taheri

Governor of Khorasan Province
- In office 1981–1982
- President: Ali Khamenei
- Preceded by: Hassan Ghafourifard
- Succeeded by: Abdullah Kopayi

Personal details
- Born: 19 December 1945 Varamin, Tehran Province, Iran
- Died: 29 January 2019 (aged 73) Tehran, Iran
- Party: Islamic Coalition Party
- Education: University of Tehran

Mohammad Nabi Habibi (Persian: محمدنبی حبیبی, 19 December 1945 – 29 January 2019) was an Iranian politician and sociologist who was Secretary-General of the Islamic Coalition Party from 2004 until his death in 2019. He was Mayor of Tehran from 1983 until 1987, for a span lasting 44 months.

== Political career ==
Habibi was a part of the opposition movements against Mohammad Reza Shah during the Pahlavi era and was jailed before the 1979 Islamic Revolution. After the revolution he gained a strong political profile and was *appointed to key positions including:

- Governor of Tehran province
- Governor of greater Khorasan province
- Deputy of Minister of Transportation
- The head of Iran Civil Aviation Organization
- The head of Iran Post

Party political offices
Preceded by Habibollah Asgaroladi	Secretary-General of Islamic Coalition Party; 2004–2019	Succeeded by Asadollah Badamchian
Preceded by Asadollah Badamchian	Executive Secretary of the Islamic Coalition Party; 2001–2004	Succeeded by Mohammad-Ali Amani
Preceded by Ali Akbar Parvaresh	Deputy Secretary-General of the Islamic Coalition Party; 2001–2004	Succeeded by Asadollah Badamchian
