= Mohammad Mousavi Khoeiniha =

Iranian Ayatollah (born 1945)

Ayatollah Seyyed Mohammad Mousavi Khoeiniha
- محمد موسوی خوئینی‌ها
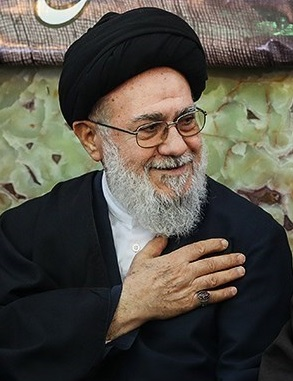

President of Center for Strategic Research
- In office 1989–1992
- Preceded by: Position established
- Succeeded by: Hassan Rouhani

Attorney-General of Iran
- In office 1985–1989
- Appointed by: Abdul-Karim Mousavi Ardebili
- Preceded by: Yousef Saanei
- Succeeded by: Mohammad Reyshahri

First Deputy of the Parliament of Iran
- In office 15 July 1981 – 19 July 1982
- Preceded by: Ali-Akbar Parvaresh
- Succeeded by: Mohammad Yazdi

Member of the Parliament of Iran
- In office 28 May 1980 – 28 May 1984
- Constituency: Tehran, Rey, Shemiranat and Eslamshahr
- Majority: 1,248,391 (58%)

Member of the Assembly of Experts
- In office 15 August 1983 – 21 February 1991
- Constituency: Tehran province

Personal details
- Born: 1945 (age 80–81) Qazvin, Imperial State of Iran
- Party: Association of Combatant Clerics

Mohammad Mousavi Khoeiniha (Persian: محمد موسوی خوئینی‌ها) (born 1945) is an Iranian cleric and secretary general of the reformist Association of Combatant Clerics. He was the founder of the now defunct Salam and was a member of the Expediency Discernment Council.

== Biography ==
Khoeiniha was born in Qazvin, Imperial State of Iran, in 1945. However, Mohammad Sahimi gives his birth year as 1938. He moved to Qom to study religion in 1961. There he was educated by Ayatollah Seyyed Mostafa Mohaqiq Damad, and Grand Ayatollahs, including Mohammad Ali Araki and Hossein Ali Montazeri. In 1966, he moved to Najaf, Iraq, and continued his studies under the guidance of Ayatollah Khomeini. His stay in Najaf lasted brief and he returned to Iran in 1967. In 1977, he was arrested by SAVAK. Although he was sentenced to fifteen years in jail, he was freed in the fall of 1978 due to unrest in the country.

Following the 1979 revolution he became one of the aides of Ayatollah Khomeini. He was named Khomeini's representative at the Iran's Council of National Radio and TV but lost that post after hostage taking opponent Banisadr became president and engineered his resignation. He was the spiritual leader of the Muslim Student Followers of the Imam's Line who led the hostage taking of American embassy staff on 4 November 1979. He was asked by Ayatollah Khomeini to "supervise" the students during the incident, thus giving them legitimacy.

He is reported to have held the post of deputy speaker of the Majles in the early 1980s. He was appointed by Khomeini prosecutor general of Iran, replacing Ayatollah Yousef Sanei in the post in the mid-1980s. Then Khoeiniha was made a member of the Supreme Judicial Council and also, of the Expediency Council. In 1989, he was appointed by Khomeini as his representative in the constitution assembly that was formed to review the constitution.

He is reported to have been "considerably to the left of the conservative mullah establishment" and also have had a less orthodox interpretive take on Koranic doctrine than them. Khoeniha remains a staunch defender of the embassy takeover, and still keeps "a four-drawer metal filing cabinet with a plate saying 'Property of the General Services Administration,`" in his office, a souvenir taken from the embassy.

Khoeiniha and other "left-wing ... veteran revolutionary mullahs" from the Assembly of Militant Clerics founded Salam in 1991, after the Assembly members were not only banned by the conservative Guardian Council from running for the Assembly of Experts but could find no newspaper even willing to print that news and their protest. Despite its limited circulation and focus on influencing policy, the paper became very popular and helped elect reformist Muhammad Khatami president in 1997.

Salam was banned on 7 July 1999 for releasing "an alleged secret memo by a former intelligence agent, urging authorities to tighten restrictions on the press". This "triggering student demonstrations of a magnitude not seen since the 1979 revolution."

On 25 July 1999 the Special Clerical Court convicted Khoeiniha as Salam's publisher "of defamation and spreading false information in connection with the alleged memo". He was sentenced to three years in prison and a lashing. However, the court suspended this sentence and reduced his sentence to a fine of 23 million rials (US$13,000), "because of his sterling revolutionary credentials". Less than two weeks later the Clergy court "imposed a five-year ban on Salam and banned Musavi-Khoeiniha from practicing journalism for three years". The court ruled that the journalist was "guilty of disseminating untruthful and distorted news aimed at harming public opinion."

Until 2006, Khoeiniha was not active. He became the leader of the Association of Combatant Clerics when Mehdi Karroubi left the party to establish another one.

== See also ==
- List of ayatollahs

Assembly seats
Preceded by Ali Akbar Parvaresh	1st Vice Speaker of Parliament of Iran; 1981–1982	Succeeded by Mohammad Yazdi
Unknown	2nd Vice Speaker of Parliament of Iran; 1980–1981; 1983–1984	Succeeded by Habibollah Asgaroladi
Preceded by Mohammad Khamenei	2nd Vice Speaker of Parliament of Iran; 1980–1981; 1983–1984	Succeeded by Mohammad Mehdi Rabbani-Amlashi
Party political offices
Preceded by Mehdi Karroubi	Secretary-General of the Association of Combatant Clerics; 2005–present	Incumbent
