= Abbas Sheibani =

Iranian politician (1931–2022)

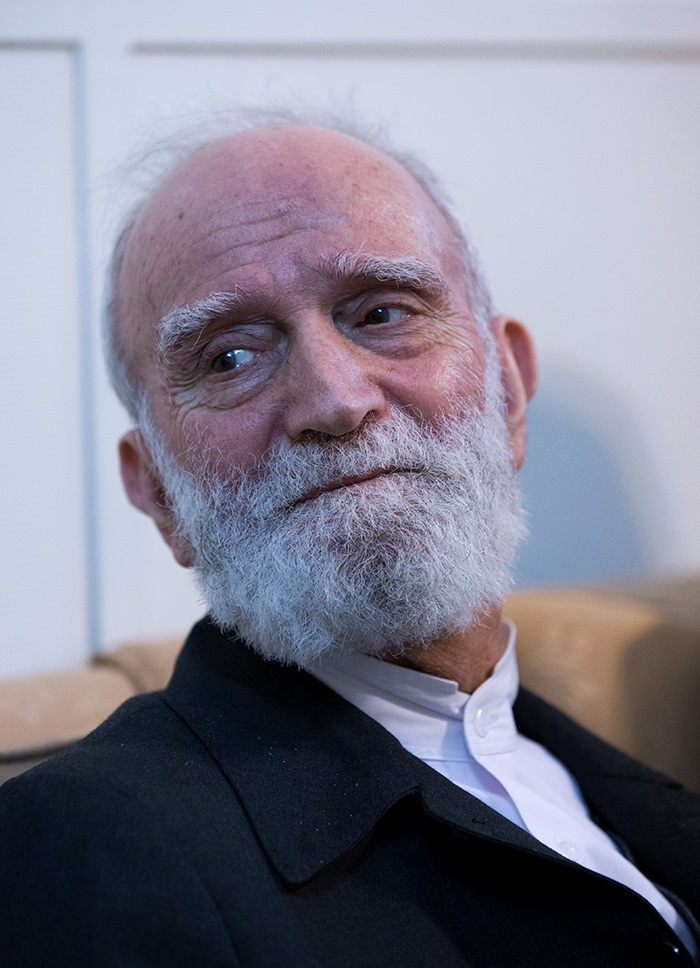
- Sheibani in 2018

Member of City Council of Tehran
- In office 29 April 2003 – 22 August 2017
- Majority: 173,277 (7.72%)

Member of Parliament of Iran
- In office 24 August 1981 – 28 May 2000
- Constituency: Tehran, Rey, Shemiranat and Eslamshahr
- Majority: 1,580,985 (85%; first term)

Minister of Agriculture
- In office 17 November 1979 – 12 August 1980
- Appointed by: Council of Islamic Revolution
- Preceded by: Ali Mohammad Izadi
- Succeeded by: Mohammad Salamati

Member of Assembly of Experts for Constitution
- In office 15 August 1979 – 15 November 1979
- Constituency: Tehran
- Majority: 1,380,704 (54.6%)

Personal details
- Born: 12 November 1931 Tehran, Persia
- Died: 22 December 2022 (aged 91)
- Party: Association of Islamic Revolution Loyalists; Islamic Association of Physicians
- Other political affiliations: Islamic Republican Party (1979–1987); Freedom Movement (1961–1965); National Front (1950–1961)
- Education: Tehran University of Medical Sciences

Abbas Sheibani (Persian: عباس شیبانی; 12 November 1931 – 22 December 2022) was an Iranian physician, university professor and conservative and principlist politician. He was a founding member of Freedom Movement of Iran and member of City Council of Tehran. He also served as a member in both Parliament House and Assembly of Experts for Constitution. He was also Minister of Agriculture from 1979 to 1980 and President of University of Tehran from 1983 to 1984. He was also a candidate for the presidential elections in July 1981 and in 1989, finishing second in both of them.

Sheibani died on 22 December 2022, at the age of 91.
