= Asadollah Bayat-Zanjani =

Iranian Grand Ayatollah

Grand Ayatollah Asadollah Bayat-Zanjani
- اسدالله بیات زنجانی
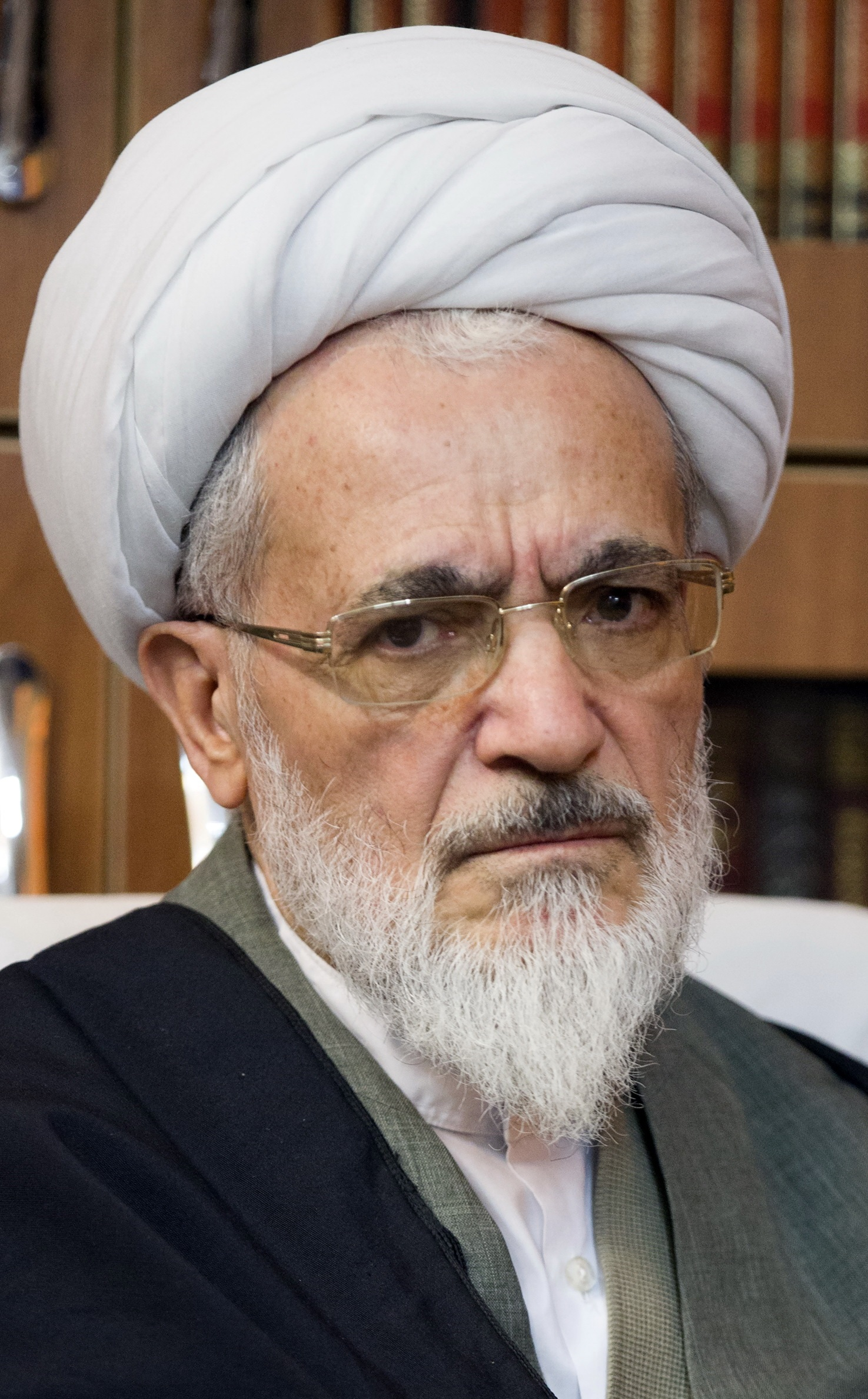

Member of the Parliament
- In office 28 May 1984 – 28 May 1992
- Constituency: Zanjan and Tarom
- In office 28 May 1980 – 28 May 1984
- Constituency: Mahneshan and Ijrud

Personal details
- Born: 23 December 1941 (age 84) Zanjan, Iran
- Party: Association of Combatant Clerics
- Education: Qom Seminary

Grand Ayatollah Asadollah Bayat-Zanjani (Persian: اسدالله بیات زنجانی) is an Iranian theologian, Islamic philosopher, writer and Grand marja of Islam. He has published objections to Iran's system of Islamic Jurist Guardianship known as velayat-e faqih, asserting that this system is not founded on Islam.

== Biography ==
Grand Ayatollah Zanjani studied religion in Zanjan and Qom and was promoted to degree of Marja', thus being a mujtahid. Among his teachers were Allameh Tabatabaei, Morteza Motahhari, Ruhollah Khomeini, Ayatollah Araki and Golpaygani.

He is author of more than 10 books and is currently teaching Philosophy and religion in Qom Seminary.

== Political career ==
Before the 1979 Iranian Revolution, Zanjani was a pro-democracy activist. In 1972, he was arrested and spent a year in prison. After the revolution, he was involved in the launching of the Islamic Republican Party. Zanjani was also a member of the committee to reassess the Iranian constitution. He was elected three times to Iranian parliament where he represented the city of Zanjan.

Grand Ayatollah Zanjani was among the influential clerics who supported ex-prime minister Mousavi and questioned the legitimacy of Mahmoud Ahmadinejad's presidency.

In September 2022, following the death of Mahsa Amini in the custody of the Guidance Patrol, Zanjani said that the Guidance Patrol is “not only an illegal and anti-Islamic body, but also illogical. No part of our country’s laws assigns any mission or responsibility to this vigilante force,” and accused it of committing “repression and immoral acts.”

On 3 February 2026, Zanjani's son, Mohsen, announced that his father cancelled the annual Mid-Sha'ban celebrations in memory of those killed during the 2025–2026 Iranian protests.

== Works ==
The works of Bayat Zanjani include Ma'refat Allah, Nezam-e Eghtesadi-ye Eslam, Emam va Emamat az Didgah-e Quran va Sonnat, Khodsazi, Aliyat dar Andishe-ye Filosofan-e Sharq, Manabe-ye Mali-ye Dowlat-e Eslami, Ensān dar Qur'an, Tawhid, Resale-ye Ahkam va Manasek-e Hajj, Andishe-ye Siyasi-ye Eslam va Madinat al-Nabi, Seyri dar Mabani-ye Andishe-ye Siyasi-ye Eslam, Nezam-e Siyasi-ye Eslam, Mizan al-Adalah, Dirasat fi Ilm al-Usul (volumes 1–3), Al-Qur'an fi al-Qur'an, Tashayyu' Alavi, Hozur-e Hazer, and Al-Fiqh al-Arqa.

Assembly seats
Preceded by Hossein Hashemian	2nd Vice Speaker of Parliament of Iran; 1990–1992	Succeeded by Ali Akbar Parvaresh
