= List of speakers of the Parliament of Iran =

Speaker of the Parliament of the Islamic Republic Iran
- Official Seal

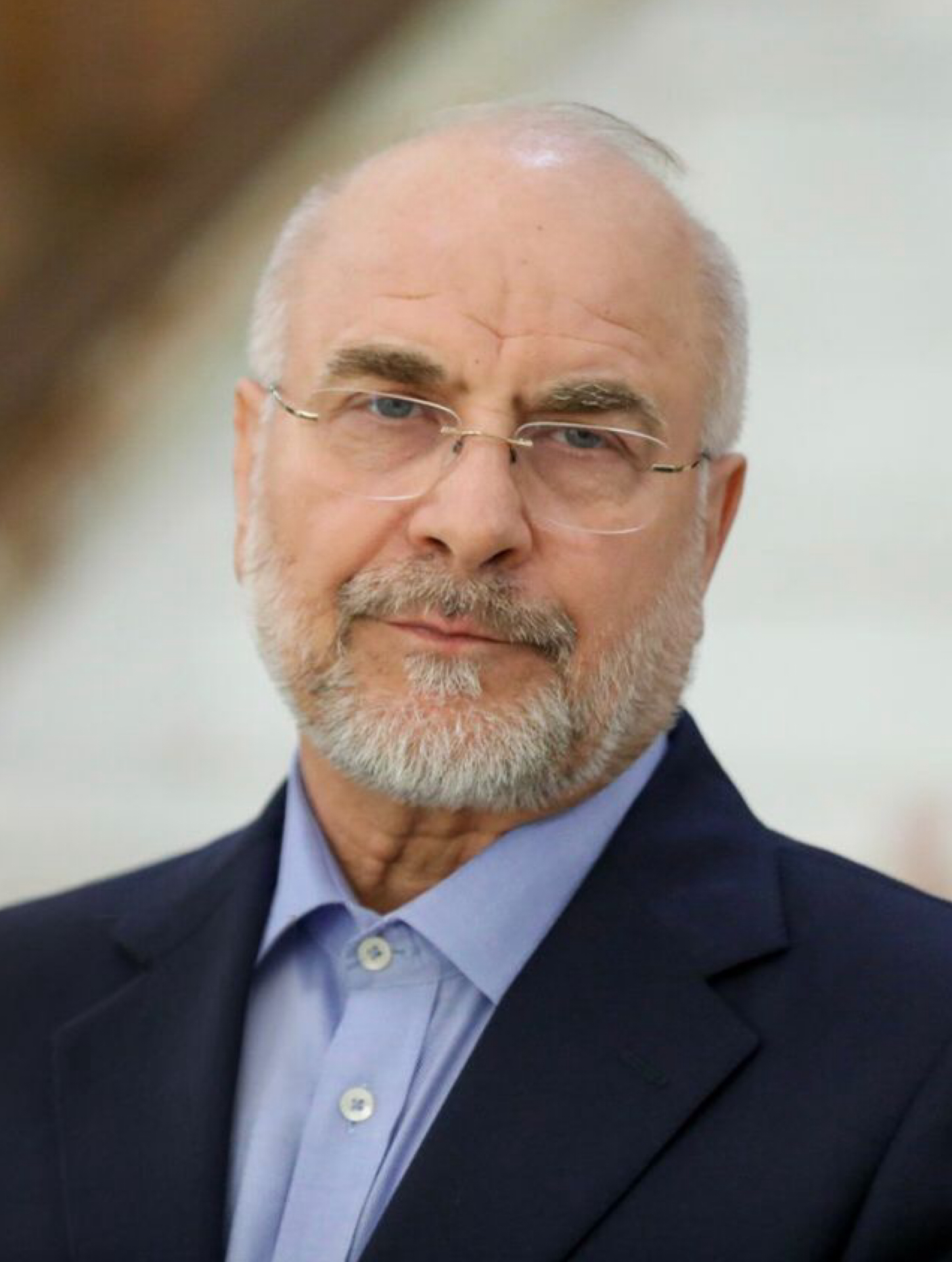
- Incumbent; Mohammad Bagher Ghalibaf since 28 May 2020
- Residence: National Consultative Assembly building
- Appointer: Members of the Islamic Consultative Assembly
- Term length: 1 year
- Inaugural holder: Morteza Gholi Khan Hedayat
- Formation: 6 October 1906
- Salary: US$22,000 annually
- Website: Official website Browser warning: Website not secure!

This article lists the speakers of the Parliament of Iran (Persian: رئیس مجلس شورای اسلامی, romanized: Raeis Majles Shoraye Eslami), from the Persian Constitutional Revolution to present, covering both the National Consultative Assembly until 1979 and the Islamic Consultative Assembly since 1980.

== List of speakers ==
No.	Portrait	Name (Birth–Death)	Took office	Left office	Party/Fraction	Term
National Consultative Assembly
1		Morteza Gholi Khan (1856–1911)	6 October 1906	23 June 1907	Moderates	1st
2		Mahmoud Alamir	10 September 1907	28 March 1908	Independent	1st
3		Mirza Esmaiel Khan (1880–1933)	1908		Moderates	1st
4		Mirza Sadeq Khan	1909	1910	Democrats	2nd
5		Mirza Mohammad-Ali Khan (1877–1942)	1910	1911	Independent	2nd
(3)		Mirza Esmaiel Khan (1880–1933)	1911	1912	Moderates	2nd
6		Hossein Pirnia (1875–1948)	1912		Moderates	2nd
6		Hossein Pirnia (1875–1948)	6 December 1914	13 November 1915	Moderates	3rd
6		Hossein Pirnia (1875–1948)	1921	1923	Independent	4th
6		Hossein Pirnia (1875–1948)	1924	1925	Independent	5th
7		Hassan Mostofi (1874–1932)	1925	1926	Revival Party	5th
8		Mohammad Tadayon (1881–1951)	11 July 1926	13 February 1927	Revival Party	6th
(6)		Hossein Pirnia (1875–1948)	1927	1928	Independent	6th
9		Hossein Dadgar (1889–1971)	1929	1935	Independent	7th
9		Hossein Dadgar (1889–1971)	1929	1935	Independent	8th
9		Hossein Dadgar (1889–1971)	1929	1935	Independent	9th
10		Hassan Esfandiary (1867–1945)	1935	1943	Independent	10th
10		Hassan Esfandiary (1867–1945)	1935	1943	Independent	11th
10		Hassan Esfandiary (1867–1945)	1935	1943	Independent	12th
10		Hassan Esfandiary (1867–1945)	1935	1943	Independent	13th
11		Mohammad Sadeq Tabatabai'	6 March 1944	12 March 1946	National Union Party	14th
12		Reza Hekmat (1891–1978)	25 March 1947	1 July 1952	Democrat Party	15th
12		Reza Hekmat (1891–1978)	25 March 1947	1 July 1952	Independent	16th
13		Hassan Emami (1903–1981)	1 July 1952	6 August 1952	Independent	17th
14		Abol-Ghasem Kashani (1882–1962)	8 August 1952	1 July 1953	National Front	17th
15		Abdollah Moazemi (1907–1971)	1 July 1953	16 August 1953	National Front	17th
(12)		Reza Hekmat (1891–1978)	16 August 1953	5 August 1963	Independent	18th
(12)		Reza Hekmat (1891–1978)	16 August 1953	5 August 1963	Independent	19th
(12)		Reza Hekmat (1891–1978)	16 August 1953	5 August 1963	Independent	20th
16		Abdollah Riazi (1907–1979)	5 August 1963	7 October 1978	New Iran Party	21st
16		Abdollah Riazi (1907–1979)	5 August 1963	7 October 1978	New Iran Party	22nd
16		Abdollah Riazi (1907–1979)	5 August 1963	7 October 1978	New Iran Party	23rd
16		Abdollah Riazi (1907–1979)	5 August 1963	7 October 1978	Resurgence Party	24th
17		Javad Saeed (1923–1979)	7 October 1978	11 February 1979	Resurgence Party	24th
Islamic Consultative Assembly
1		Akbar Hashemi Rafsanjani (1934–2017)	28 July 1980	3 August 1989	Islamic Republican Party	1st
1		Akbar Hashemi Rafsanjani (1934–2017)	28 July 1980	3 August 1989	Islamic Republican Party	2nd
1		Akbar Hashemi Rafsanjani (1934–2017)	28 July 1980	3 August 1989	Combatant Clergy Association	3rd
2		Mehdi Karroubi (born 1937)	3 August 1989	3 May 1992	Association of Combatant Clerics	3rd
3		Ali Akbar Nategh-Nuri (born 1944)	28 May 1992	27 May 2000	Combatant Clergy Association	4th
3		Ali Akbar Nategh-Nuri (born 1944)	28 May 1992	27 May 2000	Combatant Clergy Association	5th
(2)		Mehdi Karroubi (born 1937)	28 May 2000	27 May 2004	Association of Combatant Clerics	6th
4		Gholam-Ali Haddad-Adel (born 1945)	29 May 2004	27 May 2008	Independent	7th
5		Ali Larijani (1958–2026)	28 May 2008	27 May 2020	Independent	8th
5		Ali Larijani (1958–2026)	28 May 2008	27 May 2020	Independent	9th
5		Ali Larijani (1958–2026)	28 May 2008	27 May 2020	Independent	10th
6		Mohammad Bagher Ghalibaf (born 1961)	28 May 2020	Incumbent	Progress and Justice Population	11th
6		Mohammad Bagher Ghalibaf (born 1961)	28 May 2020	Incumbent	Progress and Justice Population	12th

== Speakers and deputies after the Revolution ==
Right/Principlist
Left/Reformist

Term	Years	Session	Speaker	First Deputy Speaker	Second Deputy Speaker
1st	1980–1984	1st	Akbar Hashemi Rafsanjani	Ali Akbar Parvaresh	Mohammad Mousavi Khoeiniha
1st	1980–1984	2nd	Akbar Hashemi Rafsanjani	Mohammad Mousavi Khoeiniha	Habibollah Asgaroladi
1st	1980–1984	2nd	Akbar Hashemi Rafsanjani	Mohammad Mousavi Khoeiniha	Mohammad Yazdi
1st	1980–1984	3rd	Akbar Hashemi Rafsanjani	Mohammad Yazdi	Mohammad Khamenei
1st	1980–1984	4th	Akbar Hashemi Rafsanjani	Mohammad Yazdi	Mohammad Mousavi Khoeiniha
2nd	1984–1988	1st	Akbar Hashemi Rafsanjani	Mohammad Yazdi	Mohammad Mehdi Rabbani-Amlashi
2nd	1984–1988	2nd	Akbar Hashemi Rafsanjani	Mohammad Yazdi	Mehdi Karroubi
2nd	1984–1988	3rd	Akbar Hashemi Rafsanjani	Mehdi Karroubi	Mohammad Yazdi
2nd	1984–1988	4th	Akbar Hashemi Rafsanjani	Mohammad Yazdi	Mehdi Karroubi
3rd	1988–1992	1st	Akbar Hashemi Rafsanjani	Mehdi Karroubi	Hossein Hashemian
3rd	1988–1992	2nd	Akbar Hashemi Rafsanjani	Mehdi Karroubi	Hossein Hashemian
3rd	1988–1992	2nd	Mehdi Karroubi	Hossein Hashemian	Asadollah Bayat Zanjani
3rd	1988–1992	3rd	Mehdi Karroubi	Hossein Hashemian	Asadollah Bayat Zanjani
3rd	1988–1992	4th	Mehdi Karroubi	Hossein Hashemian	Asadollah Bayat Zanjani
4th	1992–1996	1st	Ali Akbar Nategh-Nuri	Hassan Rouhani	Ali Akbar Parvaresh
4th	1992–1996	2nd	Ali Akbar Nategh-Nuri	Hassan Rouhani	Mohammad Ali Movahedi Kermani
4th	1992–1996	3rd	Ali Akbar Nategh-Nuri	Hassan Rouhani	Hossein Hashemian
4th	1992–1996	4th	Ali Akbar Nategh-Nuri	Hassan Rouhani	Mohammad Ali Movahedi Kermani
5th	1996–2000	1st	Ali Akbar Nategh-Nuri	Hassan Rouhani	Mohammad Ali Movahedi Kermani
5th	1996–2000	2nd	Ali Akbar Nategh-Nuri	Hassan Rouhani	Mohammad Ali Movahedi Kermani
5th	1996–2000	3rd	Ali Akbar Nategh-Nuri	Hassan Rouhani	Mohammad Ali Movahedi Kermani
5th	1996–2000	4th	Ali Akbar Nategh-Nuri	Hassan Rouhani	Mohammad Ali Movahedi Kermani
6th	2000–2004	1st	Mehdi Karoubi	Behzad Nabavi	Mohammad Reza Khatami
6th	2000–2004	2nd	Mehdi Karoubi	Mohammad Reza Khatami	Mohsen Armin
6th	2000–2004	3rd	Mehdi Karoubi	Behzad Nabavi	Mohammad Reza Khatami
6th	2000–2004	4th	Mehdi Karoubi	Mohammad Reza Khatami	Behzad Nabavi
6th	2000–2004	4th	Mehdi Karoubi	Mohammad Reza Khatami	Ali Shakouri-Rad
7th	2004–2008	1st	Gholam-Ali Haddad-Adel	Mohammad-Reza Bahonar	Mohammad-Hassan Aboutorabi Fard
7th	2004–2008	2nd	Gholam-Ali Haddad-Adel	Mohammad-Reza Bahonar	Mohammad-Hassan Aboutorabi Fard
7th	2004–2008	3rd	Gholam-Ali Haddad-Adel	Mohammad-Reza Bahonar	Mohammad-Hassan Aboutorabi Fard
7th	2004–2008	4th	Gholam-Ali Haddad-Adel	Mohammad-Reza Bahonar	Mohammad-Hassan Aboutorabi Fard
8th	2008–2012	1st	Ali Larijani	Mohammad-Hassan Aboutorabi Fard	Mohammad-Reza Bahonar
8th	2008–2012	2nd	Ali Larijani	Mohammad-Hassan Aboutorabi Fard	Mohammad-Reza Bahonar
8th	2008–2012	3rd	Ali Larijani	Mohammad-Hassan Aboutorabi Fard	Shahab od-Din Sadr
8th	2008–2012	4th	Ali Larijani	Mohammad-Reza Bahonar	Shahab od-Din Sadr
9th	2012–2016	1st	Ali Larijani	Mohammad-Hassan Aboutorabi Fard	Mohammad-Reza Bahonar
9th	2012–2016	2nd	Ali Larijani	Mohammad-Hassan Aboutorabi Fard	Mohammad-Reza Bahonar
9th	2012–2016	3rd	Ali Larijani	Mohammad-Hassan Aboutorabi Fard	Mohammad-Reza Bahonar
9th	2012–2016	4th	Ali Larijani	Mohammad-Hassan Aboutorabi Fard	Mohammad-Reza Bahonar
10th	2016–2020	1st	Ali Larijani	Masoud Pezeshkian	Ali Motahari
10th	2016–2020	2nd	Ali Larijani	Masoud Pezeshkian	Ali Motahari
10th	2016–2020	3rd	Ali Larijani	Masoud Pezeshkian	Ali Motahari
10th	2016–2020	4th	Ali Larijani	Masoud Pezeshkian	Abdolreza Mesri
11th	2020–2024	1st	Mohammad Bagher Ghalibaf	Amir-Hossein Ghazizadeh Hashemi	Ali Nikzad
11th	2020–2024	2nd	Mohammad Bagher Ghalibaf	Ali Nikzad	Abdolreza Mesri
11th	2020–2024	3rd	Mohammad Bagher Ghalibaf	Ali Nikzad	Abdolreza Mesri
11th	2020–2024	4th	Mohammad Bagher Ghalibaf	Abdolreza Mesri	Mojtaba Zonnour
12th	2024–	1st	Mohammad Bagher Ghalibaf	Hamid-Reza Haji Babaee	Ali Nikzad

=== Aging speakers ===
Traditionally, after a new term of the parliament is started and the new speaker is not elected yet, by default the eldest member of the parliament becomes the temporary speaker also known as the "Aging Speaker" (Persian: رئیس سنی مجلس). The second-eldest member becomes his/her deputy. The two youngest members or Baby of the House take office as temporary secretaire.

Term	Year	Aging Speaker	Deputy Speaker
1st	1980	Yadollah Sahabi	Mehdi Bazargan
2nd	1984	Saeed Amani	Ahmad Amirzadeh Irani
3rd	1988	Mohammad-Hossein Chehregani	Mohammad-Hassan Nabavi
4th	1992	Mohammad-Bagher Mahdavi Kermani	Ahmad Moradi
5th	1996	Mahmoud Nourizadeh	Heydar Ebrahimbai-Salami
6th	2000	Mohammad-Ali Sheikh	Ghassem Me'mari
7th	2004	Mohammad-Ali Sheikh	Abbas Paknejad
8th	2008	Mohammad Taqi Rahbar	Hossein Hashemian
9th	2012	Alireza Marandi	Mohammad-Reza Ashtiani Araghi
10th	2016	Abdolreza Hashemzaei	Mostafa Zolghadr
11th	2020	Reza Taghavi	Mostafa Mir-Salim
12th	2024	Alaeddin Boroujerdi	Hossein Ali Shahriari

== See also ==
- Senate of Iran
