= Mohammad Marandi =

American-Iranian academic and intellectual (born 1966)

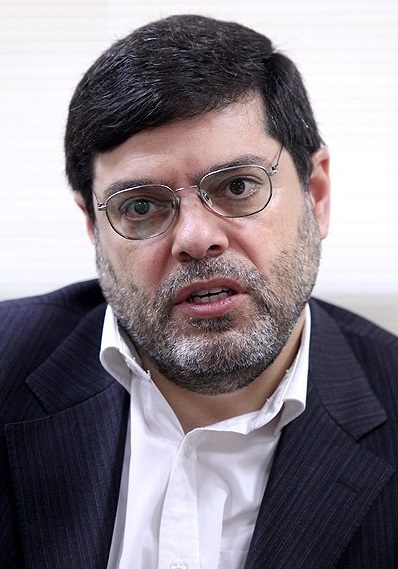
- Marandi in 2014
- Born: 14 May 1966 (age 60); Richmond, Virginia, United States
- Citizenship: Iran; United States
- Occupations: Professor, author, analyst
- Parent: Alireza Marandi (father)

Academic background
- Education: University of Birmingham (PhD)
- Thesis: Lord Byron, his critics and Orientalism (2003)
- Military service
- Allegiance: Iran
- Branch: IRGC
- Service years: 1980–1988

Seyed Mohammad Marandi (Note: Persian: محمد مرندی) (born 14 May 1966) is an Iranian-American academic, intellectual and political analyst. He has been described as having close connections to the Iranian government, acting as an adviser to the Iranian nuclear negotiations team in Vienna.

Marandi was born in Richmond, Virginia, to Alireza Marandi, who later became the doctor of the second supreme leader of the Islamic Republic of Iran, Ali Khamenei. Mohammad Marandi moved to Iran at the age of 13 when he volunteered to fight in the Iran–Iraq War. Marandi later studied at Birmingham University, England. He currently serves as a professor at the University of Tehran.

== Early life and education ==
Seyed Mohammad Marandi was born on 14 May 1966 in Richmond, Virginia. He is the son of Alireza Marandi, who would later become Iran's Health Minister and doctor of the Iranian supreme leader Ali Khamenei. Marandi spent the first 13 years of his life in the United States. Following the 1979 Iranian revolution, his family moved to Iran. He volunteered to fight in the Iran–Iraq War at the age of 16, during which he said he survived two Iraqi chemical weapons attacks.

Marandi is a graduate of the University of Tehran and Birmingham University (UK), where his PhD thesis was entitled "Lord Byron, his critics and Orientalism". It has been described as a "response to Edward Said's Orientalism".

== Career ==
Marandi was the head of the North American Studies program at the University of Tehran; he is currently a professor of English Literature and Orientalism at the university.

Marandi has appeared as a political and social commentator on international news networks such as Channel 4, Sky News, PBS, ABC, CGTN, CNN, BBC, Al Jazeera, and RT. He has also contributed opinion pieces to publications such as Al Jazeera, Middle East Eye, and Tehran Times.

He is an adviser to the Iranian nuclear negotiations team in Vienna, and is described as having close connections to the Iranian government.

== Views ==
Following the 2022 stabbing of Salman Rushdie, Marandi wrote:

I won't be shedding tears for a writer who spouts endless hatred & contempt for Muslims & Islam. But is it a coincidence that just when we are on the verge of revitalising the nuclear agreement, America makes claims about an attempted assassination of Bolton and then this happens?

Marandi's statement referred to the United States Department of Justice's allegation that Iran had planned to assassinate US national security advisor John Bolton in 2020. Marandi has been described of not being overly concerned about UN resolutions against Iran. According to a tweet by the Twitter account of reformist daily Shargh posted on 28 December 2021, Marandi stated:

What will happen if the UN resolutions against Iran are revived? We attach no value to the other side's ultimatums, because nothing is going to happen to us even if they pull out of the JCPOA and activate the trigger mechanism.

On 1 October 2024, Marandi said on BBC's Today programme, that the Israeli government was a "genocidal regime" that was committing a "holocaust in Gaza", and "believes in ethno-supremacism". The Jewish Leadership Council and Simon Schama criticized the comments as antisemitic, while pro-Israeli organization CAMERA described Marandi's comments as "racist rant and redundant claims of 'genocide'." The BBC wrote that its presenter did challenge Marandi during the interview, but stated that it should have challenged Marandi's language further throughout the interview.

Following the death of U.S. Senator Lindsey Graham in July 2026, Marandi said: "It's a shame. I wanted him to see oil prices on Monday before he went to hell."

== Written works ==
- Mauriello, Raffaele; Marandi, Seyed (1 January 2016), Oppressors and Oppressed Reconsidered: A Shi‘itologic Perspective on the Islamic Republic of Iran and Hezbollah’s Outlook on International Relations, pp. 50–71, doi:10.1007/978-1-137-49932-5_3, ISBN 978-1-349-69847-9
- Marandi, Mohammad; Mauriello, Raffaele (2020). "The Khamenei Doctrine: Iran's Leader on Diplomacy, Foreign Policy and International Relations". Islam in International Relations: Politics and Paradigms. Taylor & Francis Group. pp. 18–38. ISBN 978-0-367-58402-3.

== See also ==
- Masoumeh Ebtekar
- Esmail Baghaei
- Masoud Pezeshkian
