= Mohammad-Ali Amani =

Iranian conservative politician

- Political party: Islamic Coalition Party
- Father: Saeed Amani

Mohammad-Ali Amani (Persian: محمدعلی امانی) is an Iranian conservative politician. He is the deputy secretary-general of the Islamic Coalition Party since 2012.

Amani was Mostafa Mir-Salim's campaign manager during 2017 Iranian presidential election.

Party political offices
Preceded by Mohammad Nabi Habibi	Executive Secretary of the Islamic Coalition Party; 2004–2019	Succeeded by Mojtaba Hamedani
Preceded by Asadollah Badamchian	Deputy Secretary-General of the Islamic Coalition Party; 2012–present	Incumbent
