= Imam Khomeini Relief Foundation =

Iranian government charity organization

Imam Khomeini's Relief Foundation
- Founded: March 5, 1979; 47 years ago
- Founder: Ruhollah Khomeini, Habibollah Asgaroladi, Mehdi Karroubi, Habibollah Shafigh, Reza Nayeri, Abolfazl Haji Heydari
- Location: Tehran, Iran
- Region served: Worldwide service
- Key people: Morteza Bakhtiari (CEO); Mohsen Kazerouni (Chairman of the board)
- Website: www.emdad.ir

The Imam Khomeini Relief Foundation (Persian: کمیته امداد امام خمینی) is an Iranian charitable organization, founded in March 1979 to provide support for poor families. The aim is to help such families regain financial stability. IKRF has also provided support outside Iran, including in Pakistan, Somalia, Afghanistan, Palestine, Bosnia and Herzegovina, Kosovo, Chechnya, the Comoros, Iraq, Tajikistan, Azerbaijan, Syria, and Lebanon.

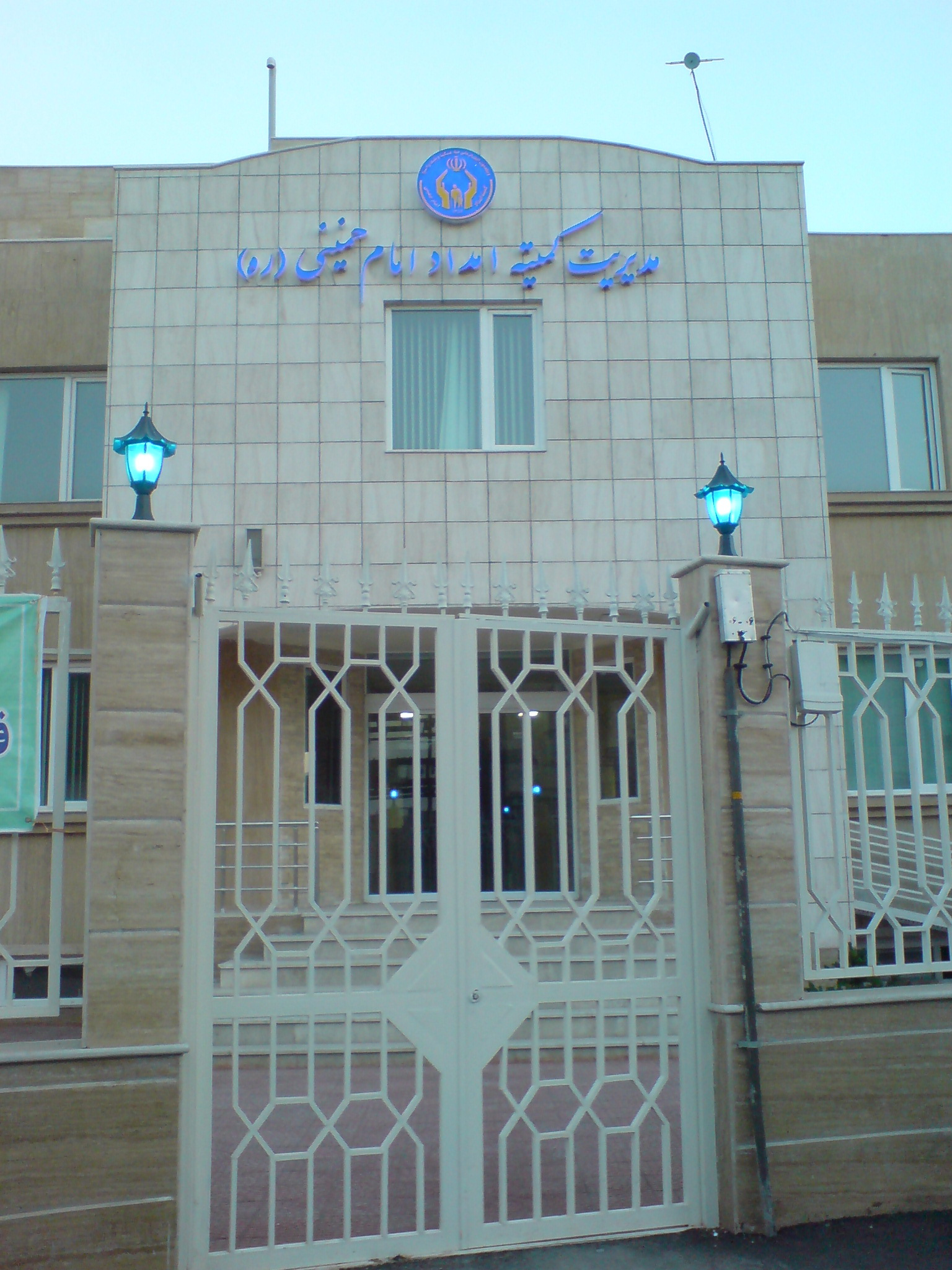
Main branch office of IKRF in Nishapur

IKRF provides multiple forms of support to individuals and families. As of December 2008, a total of 8.6 million people in need are said to have received aid from IKRF. 698 thousand families were covered in the Rajaei plan, which provides social security coverage for senior villagers and nomads without insurance. 1.5 million people below the poverty line received free insurance from IKRF and 843 thousand students received assistance for education.

== 2023 Absolute poverty reduction document ==
In September 2023 Iranian regime devised yet another revision to program for reducing absolute poverty in association with Imam Khomeini relief.

== Sources of funding ==
The foundation is supported by the Iranian government and also receives the Islamic taxes of Khums and Zakat, as well as Zakat al-fitr. Also, the foundation has charity boxes installed all across the country to gather donations.

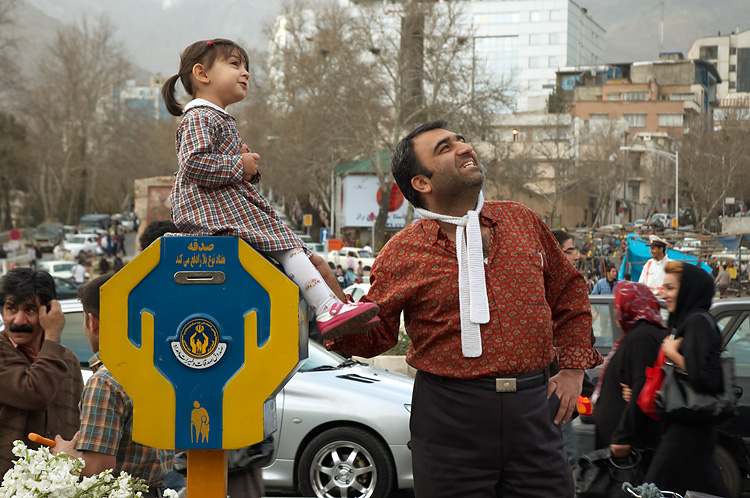
Child sitting on an IKRF charity box

== History ==
The history of such committees goes back to 1964, 15 years before Iran's revolution. At that time, the objective of the smaller committee was to support the families of political prisoners.

== See also ==
- Bonyad
