= Resalat (newspaper) =

Principlist newspaper in Iran

- Type: Daily
- Owner: Resalat Foundation
- Editor: Morteza Nabavi
- Founded: 9 January 1986; 40 years ago
- Political alignment: Conservatism (Iranian)
- Language: Persian
- Headquarters: Tehran, Iran
- Website: resalat-news.com

Resalat (Persian: رسالت, lit. 'The Prophecy') is a Persian-language principlist daily newspaper in Tehran, Iran. It is a pro-Khamenei and pro-Ahmadinejad newspaper.

== History and profile ==
Resalat was first published in 1985. The paper belongs to the Resalat Foundation and focuses on political, cultural, social, economic and sports news. Morteza Nabavi is the editor-in-chief of the daily which has a conservative stance. Amir Mohebbian served as the political editor of the paper.

In its mission statement, Resalat declares that "The goal of the daily is to spread the words of God, and Ahl al-Bayt (Shia) school of thought in order to establish the God's will and governance of Fiqh and Vilayat-e Faqih." It is close to the Islamic Coalition Party.

The paper is based in Tehran. Its circulation ranged between 30,000 and 50,000 copies in the mid-2000s.

== See also ==
- List of newspapers in Iran
- Mass media in Iran
