= Alireza Marandi =

Iranian politician

Seyyed Alireza Marandi
- علیرضا مرندی
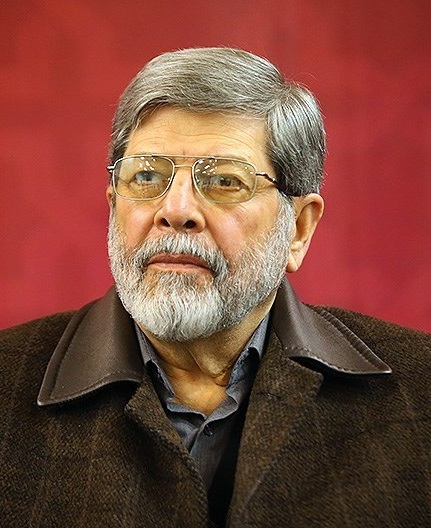

Member of the Parliament of Iran
- In office 28 May 2008 – 27 May 2016
- Constituency: Tehran, Rey, Shemiranat and Eslamshahr
- Majority: 709,391 (30.38%)

Minister of Health and Medical Education
- In office 16 August 1993 – 20 August 1997
- President: Akbar Hashemi Rafsanjani
- Preceded by: Reza Malekzadeh
- Succeeded by: Mohammad Farhadi
- In office 20 August 1984 – 29 August 1989; Acting: 16–20 August 1984
- President: Ali Khamenei
- Prime Minister: Mir-Hossein Mousavi
- Preceded by: Hadi Manafi
- Succeeded by: Iradj Fazel

Personal details
- Born: 3 December 1939 (age 86) Isfahan, Imperial State of Iran
- Party: PFIRF
- Children: Mohammad Marandi; Seyyedeh Sousan Marandi; Seyyedeh Sepideh Marandi
- Education: University of Tehran; University of Virginia

Alireza Marandi (Persian: علیرضا مرندی; born 1939) is an Iranian politician, physician, and professor of Pediatrics and Neonatology at the Shahid Beheshti University. He was also an associate professor at Wright State University before returning to Iran during the Iranian Revolution.

Marandi is a former two-term Minister of Health (and Medical Education) during the premiership of Mir Hossein Mousavi as well as the second-term presidency of Akbar Hashemi Rafsanjani. Medical education was integrated with health care delivery during his nine years in office. In each of the 29 provinces, one University of Medical Sciences was established, thus making the country self-sufficient in health and human resources. In addition to being Minister, Dr. Marandi also served as Deputy Minister and Advisory to the Minister.

Marandi is Chairman of the Iranian Society of Neonatologists; the Board of Directors of the Islamic Republic of Iran Breastfeeding Promotion Society; and the National Committee for the Reduction of Perinatal Mortality and Morbidity. He is also the laureate recipient of the United Nations Population Award (1999) and WHO's Eastern Mediterranean Region's Shousha Award (2000). He is currently a commissioner of the World Health Organization (WHO) Commission on Social Determinants of Health and a recognized expert on pediatric and neonatal health issues.

Of his major contributions was a highly successful national vaccination program (which also included a program for terminating polio in Iran), the significant reduction of infant and child mortality rates, as well as organizing one of the most successful national birth control programs in the World.

Marandi was elected as an MP from Tehran in the 2008 Iranian parliamentary elections. Around 1,700 candidates were barred from running by the Guardian Council vetting body, the Supervisory and Executive Election Boards.

The Supreme Leader of Iran is among the patients he has attended in his private medical practice. He is the father of Mohammad Marandi.

Honorary titles
Preceded by Mohammad Taqi Rahbar	Aging Speaker of the Parliament of Iran; 9th term	Succeeded by Abdolreza Hashemzaei
