= July 1981 Iranian presidential election =

- 24 July 1981
- Registered: 22,687,017
- Turnout: 64.24% (▼3.18pp)
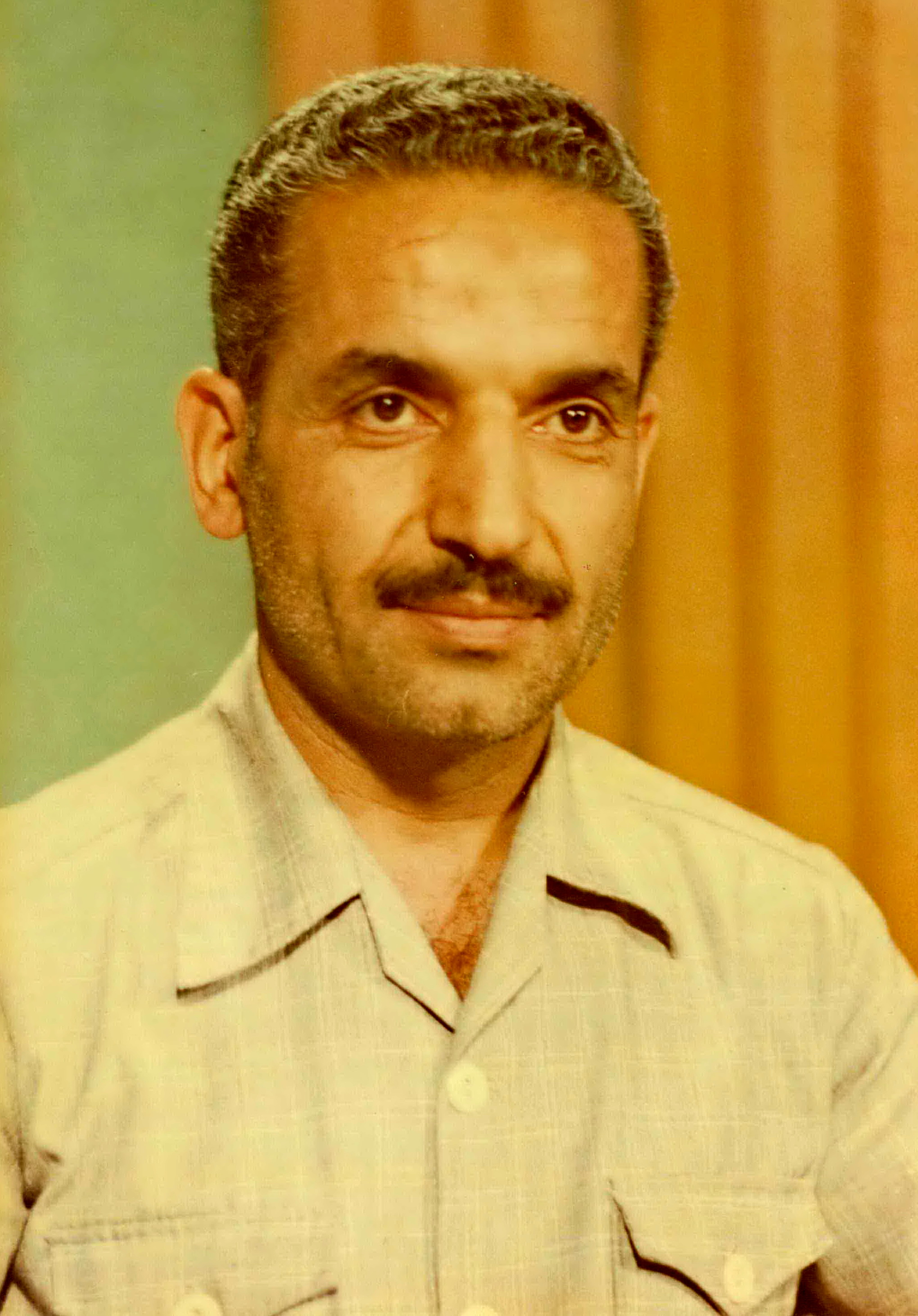

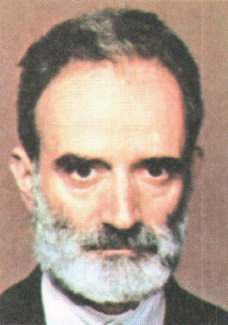
Nominee	Mohammad-Ali Rajai	Abbas Sheibani
Party	IATI	IRP
Alliance	Islamic Left (Note: Origin of the Reformists)	Traditional Right (Note: Origin of the Principlists)
Popular vote	12,779,050	658,498
Percentage	87.69%	4.52%
President before election
Abolhassan Banisadr
Independent
Elected President
Mohammad-Ali Rajai
IRP

Presidential elections were held in Iran on 24 July 1981 after the previous Iranian president, Abolhassan Banisadr, was impeached by the Majlis on 21 June and then sacked by the Supreme Leader, Ayatollah Khomeini, on 22 June. The elections occurred after the Hafte Tir bombing, which killed Mohammad Beheshti and dozens of other Iranian officials on 28 June 1981. This led to the election of Mohammad Ali Rajai, the previous prime minister, winning 13,001,761 votes out of the 14,573,803 votes cast, which was 89% of the votes. The vote turnout was 65.29%.

Rajai was killed a few weeks later on 30 August 1981, together with his prime minister, Mohammad Javad Bahonar.

== Background ==
On 28 June 1981 a bomb, planted by a 23-year-old man, named Mohammad Reza Kolahi, exploded, killing Mohammad Beheshti and dozens of other Iranian officials.

In 1981, two elections were held in Iran. The first election of 1981 took place on 24 July. The reason for the July election was due to the impeachment of the President of Iran, Abolhassan Bani-Sadr (r. 5 February 1980 – 20 June 1981).

After the Iranian Revolution in 1979, Bani-Sadr became the first president of Iran on 5 February 1980. He also claimed the role of Supreme Commander. The Majlis, Iran's parliament, impeached Bani-Sadr. Bani-Sadr was impeached due to allegations stating he was attempting to undermine clerical power in Iran. Ayatollah Khomeini was at the top of these allegations since he was the Supreme Leader and a marja' (someone of high clerical ranking in Shi'i Islam) in Iran. In Iran, the supreme leader has more power than the president, Bani-Sadr was allegedly trying to undermine Iran's top figure, Khomeini. After Bani-Sadr was found in hiding, he and his followers fled to France or were exiled (this information varies by source).

Mohammad-Ali Raja’i was Prime Minister in Iran prior to the impeachment of Bani-Sadr. After the impeachment of Bani-Sadr, Iran set up the Presidency Council, which was made up of three men:

- Prime Minister : Mohammed Ali Raja’i
- Speaker of Parliament, Akbar Hashemi Rafsanjani
- Chief Justice : Mohammed Beheshti.

Raja’i took over the day-to-day part of the presidency until the election was held.

== Candidates ==
Candidates had to be approved by the Guardian Council. 71 people applied to be candidates, but only four were allowed to run. All candidates ran under the Islamic Republican Party because Iran more or less banned all other political parties except for the Islamic Republican Party. The Islamic Republican Party was the leading party in Iran. As for the Islamic Republican Party itself, it was founded in 1979 by Iranians of high clerical status and approved by Khomeini. The party was founded within revolutionary spirits, and its purpose was to continue the revolutionary agenda. The Islamic Republican Party would rally, purge, and overthrow any organization or person that was counterrevolutionary.

All of the candidates were revolutionaries. Mohammad-Ali Raja’i was (the first) Prime Minister of Iran prior to the impeachment of Bani-Sadr, then he was part of the committee that fulfilled the presidency until the election. The runner up, Abbas Sheybani, was an Iranian politician. Seyed Akbar Parvaresh was a descendant of the Prophet Mohammed, as well as an Iranian politician. Habibollah Asgaroladi-Mosalman was also an Iranian politician.

== Results ==
This election saw an approximate 64.24% turnout of eligible voters, or 14,573,803 out of 22,687,017 registered voters.

July 1981 Iranian presidential election
Party	Candidate	Nohen et al		ISSDP	
Party	Candidate	Votes	%	Votes	%
Islamic Republican Party	Mohammad-Ali Rajai	12,960,619	88.51	12,779,050	87.69
Islamic Republican Party	Abbas Sheibani	626,301	4.28	658,498	4.52
Islamic Republican Party	Ali-Akbar Parvaresh	401,035	2.74	339,646	2.33
Islamic Republican Party	Habibollah Asgaroladi	252,349	1.72	249,457	1.71
Blank or invalid votes		402,248	2.75	547,152	3.75
Totals		14,642,552	100	14,573,803	100

== Aftermath ==
Raja’i was sworn in as president on 15 August 1981. The presidency of the former Prime Minister did not last long. On 30 August 1981, Raja’i and Mohammad-Javad Ba-Honar, the succeeding Prime Minister, were assassinated in a bombing. After Raja’i's assassination, the next presidential election took place 2 October 1981. Voter turnout increased by 2,000 plus voters in the October Elections, resulting in 74.26% of eligible voters participating in the election. Ayatollah Khamenei was elected President of Iran, receiving 94.4% of the votes. Khamenei was president from 1981 to 1989.
