= Ali-Akbar Parvaresh =

Iranian politician

Seyyed Ali-Akbar Parvaresh
- علی‌اکبر پرورش
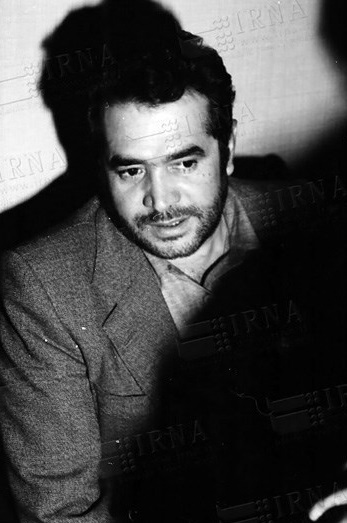

Minister of Education
- In office 17 August 1981 – 14 August 1984
- Prime Minister: Mohammad-Javad Bahonar; Mohammad-Reza Mahdavi; Mir-Hossein Mousavi
- Preceded by: Mohammad-Javad Bahonar
- Succeeded by: Kazem Akrami

First Deputy of the Parliament of Iran
- In office 16 May 1980 – 9 August 1981
- Preceded by: Office vacant
- Succeeded by: Mohammad Mousavi Khoeiniha

Member of the Parliament of Iran
- In office 28 May 1988 – 28 May 1996
- Constituency: Isfahan
- Majority: 120,943 (38.1%)
- In office 5 May 1980 – 9 August 1981
- Constituency: Isfahan
- Majority: 232,322 (71.7%)

Member of Assembly of Experts for Constitution
- In office 15 August 1979 – 15 November 1979
- Constituency: Isfahan Province
- Majority: 710,726 (75.1%)

Personal details
- Born: 1942 Isfahan, Persia
- Died: 27 December 2013 (aged 70–71) Isfahan, Iran
- Party: Islamic Coalition Party
- Education: University of Isfahan; University of Tehran

Ali-Akbar Parvaresh (Persian: علی‌اکبر پرورش; 1942 – 27 December 2013) was an Iranian politician. He was Minister of Education from 1981 to 1985 and also a parliament member for three terms, first elected in 1980 and served again from 1988 to 1996. He was a presidential candidate twice, the first time in July 1981 election which he received 401,035 (2.8% of votes) and the second time in October 1981 election gained 341,841 (2.1%) and ranked second after Ali Khamenei. He was deputy to Secretary-General of Islamic Coalition Party until 2001.

Assembly seats
Unknown	1st Vice Speaker of Parliament of Iran; 1980–1981	Succeeded by Mohammad Mousavi Khoeiniha
Preceded by Asadollah Bayat Zanjani	2nd Vice Speaker of Parliament of Iran; 1992–1993	Succeeded by Mohammad Ali Movahedi Kermani
Party political offices
New title	Deputy Secretary-General of the Islamic Coalition Party; 1993–2001	Succeeded by Mohammad Nabi Habibi
