= 1989 Iranian presidential election =

- 28 July 1989
- Registered: 30,139,598
- Turnout: 54.59% (▼0.19pp)
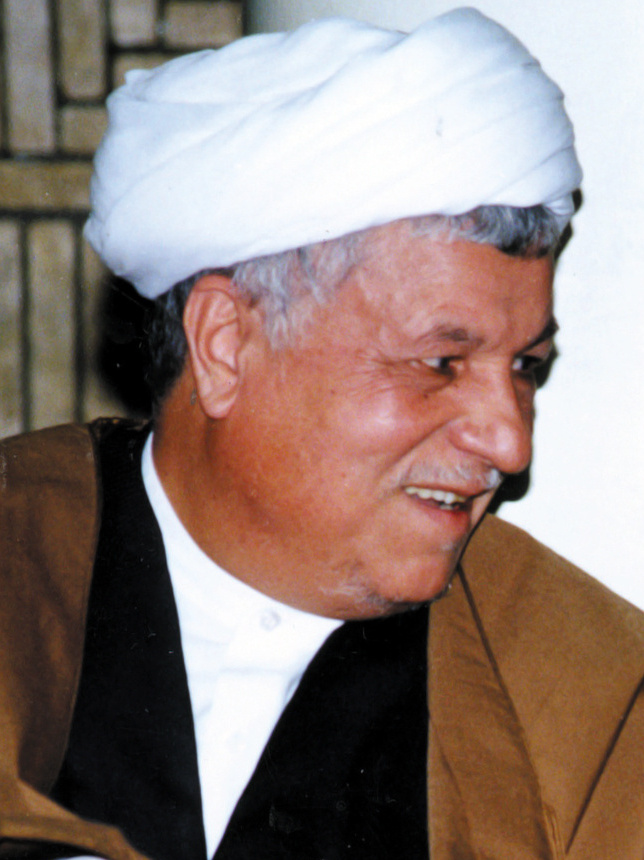

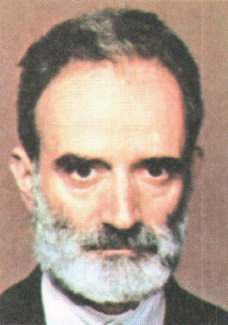
Nominee	Akbar Hashemi Rafsanjani	Abbas Sheibani
Party	CCA	Independent
Alliance	Modern Right	Traditional Right (Note: Origin of the Principlists)
Popular vote	15,537,394	632,583
Percentage	94.5%	3.8%
President before election
Ali Khamenei
CCA
Elected President
Akbar Hashemi Rafsanjani
CCA

Presidential elections were held in Iran on 28 July 1989, after the death of Ayatollah Ruhollah Khomeini and the selection of Ayatollah Ali Khamenei, the previous President of Iran, as the new Supreme Leader of Iran. Out of the seventy-nine candidates registered to run, only two were approved by the Council of Guardians, which resulted in a very predictable win by Akbar Hashemi Rafsanjani, the previous Speaker of Majlis.

The Iranian constitution was amended by referendum on the same day.

== Candidates ==
=== Disqualified candidates ===
The Guardian Council disqualified some candidates who enrolled to run for president, including:

- Ebrahim Yazdi, Head of Political Bureau of Freedom Movement of Iran

== Results ==
1989 Iranian presidential election
Party	Candidate	Nohen et al		ISSDP	
Party	Candidate	Votes	%	Votes	%
Combatant Clergy Association	Akbar Hashemi Rafsanjani	15,537,394	94.51	15,550,528	94.52
Independent	Abbas Sheibani	632,583	3.85	635,165	3.86
Blank or invalid votes		269,270	1.64	266,984	1.62
Totals		16,439,247	100	16,452,677	100
