= October 1981 Iranian presidential election =

- 2 October 1981
- Registered: 22,687,017
- Turnout: 74.26% (▲10.02pp)
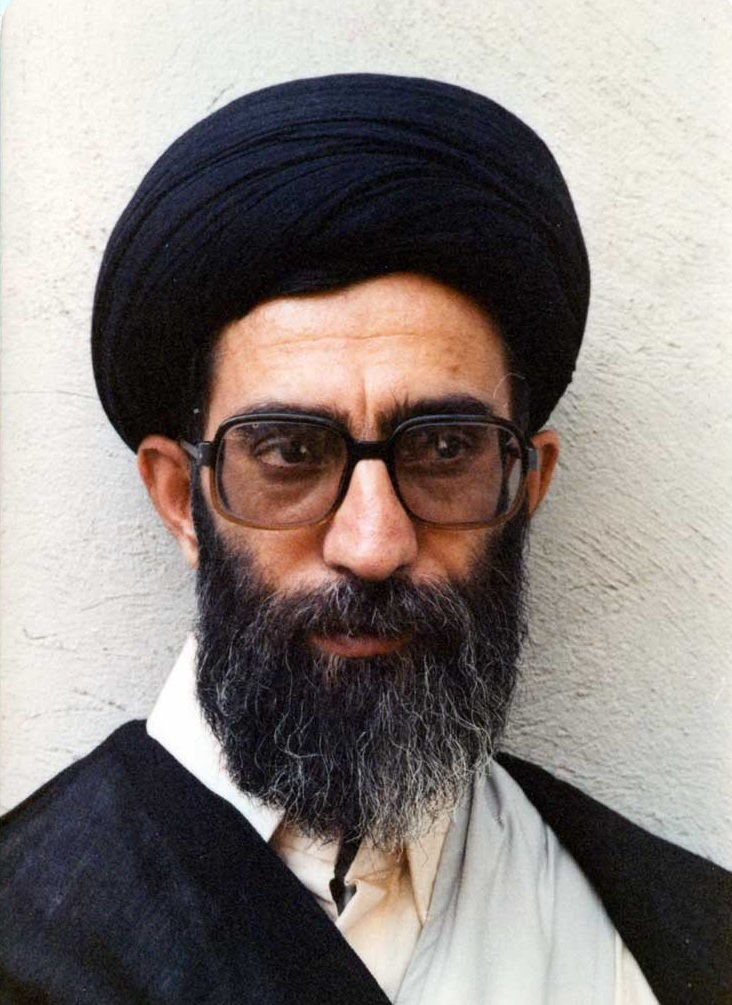

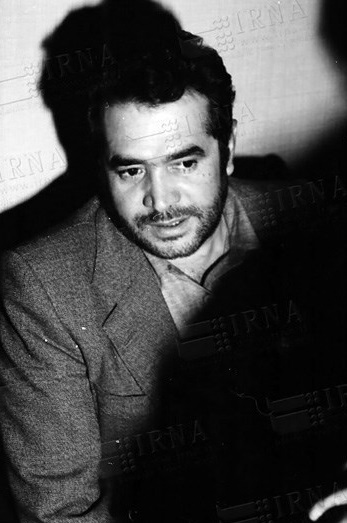
Nominee	Ali Khamenei	Ali-Akbar Parvaresh
Party	IRP	ICP
Alliance	Traditional Right (Grand Coalition)	Traditional Right
Popular vote	16,007,072	341,841
Percentage	95.01%	2.03%
President before election
Mohammad-Ali Rajai
IATI
Elected President
Ali Khamenei
IRP

Presidential elections were held in Iran on 2 October 1981 following the assassination of president Mohammad-Ali Rajai. Ali Khamenei was elected with 95% of the vote.

== Campaign ==
Ali Akbar Parvaresh, Hassan Ghafourifard and Reza Zavare'i all publicly endorsed Khamenei for president, stating on television that they would vote for him.

== Results ==
October 1981 Iranian presidential election
Party	Candidate	Nohen et al		ISSDP	
Party	Candidate	Votes	%	Votes	%
Islamic Republican Party	Ali Khamenei	16,007,072	95.01	16,008,579	95.05
Islamic Coalition Party	Ali Akbar Parvaresh	341,841	2.03	341,874	2.02
Islamic Republican Party	Hassan Ghafourifard	75,658	0.45	80,545	0.48
Islamic Republican Party	Reza Zavare'i	62,156	0.37	59,058	0.35
Blank or invalid votes		360,269	2.14	357,661	2.12
Totals		16,846,996	100	16,847,717	100
