= Mostafa Mir-Salim =

Iranian engineer and politician

Seyyed Mostafa Mir-Salim Agha
- مصطفی میرسلیم
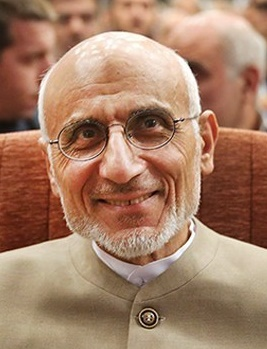
- Mir-Salim in 2017

Member of the Parliament of Iran
- In office 27 May 2020 – 26 May 2024
- Constituency: Tehran, Rey, Shemiranat, Eslamshahr and Pardis
- Majority: 892,318 (48.45%)

Member of Expediency Discernment Council
- Incumbent
- Assumed office 17 March 1997
- Appointed by: Ali Khamenei
- Chairman: Akbar Hashemi Rafsanjani; Ali Movahedi-Kermani (Acting); Mahmoud Hashemi Shahroudi; Sadeq Larijani

Minister of Culture and Islamic Guidance
- In office 22 February 1994 – 20 August 1997
- President: Akbar Hashemi Rafsanjani
- Preceded by: Ali Larijani
- Succeeded by: Ata'ollah Mohajerani

Advisor to the President of Iran for Research
- In office August 1989 – February 1994
- President: Akbar Hashemi Rafsanjani
- Succeeded by: Hassan Ghafourifard

Top Advisor to the President of Iran
- In office August 1982 – August 1989
- President: Ali Khamenei
- Preceded by: Office established
- Succeeded by: Mir-Hossein Mousavi

Supervisor of Presidential Administration of Iran
- In office August 1982 – 5 September 1989
- President: Ali Khamenei
- Preceded by: Office established
- Succeeded by: Hassan Habibi

Personal details
- Born: Seyed Mostafa Agha Mir-Salim; 10 June 1947 (age 79) Tehran, Imperial State of Iran
- Party: Islamic Coalition Party
- Other political affiliations: Islamic Republican Party (1980–87)
- Children: 3, 2 daughters and 1 son
- Education: University of Poitiers; École nationale supérieure de mécanique et d'aérotechnique IFP School
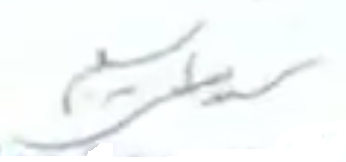
- Signature
- Website: Official website

Military service
- Allegiance: Iran
- Years of service: 1980–1981
- Commands: Shahrbani

Mostafa Mir-Salim (Persian: مصطفی میرسلیم; born 10 June 1947) is an Iranian engineer and conservative politician. He is currently member of the Expediency Discernment Council. He was formerly a member of Islamic Consultative Assembly from 2020 to 2024.

He was a presidential candidate at the 2017 election which placed third with receiving 1.16% of the votes.

== Early life and education ==
He obtained B.Sc. in Mechanics from Universite de Poitiers in 1969, M.Sc. in Mechanics from École nationale supérieure de mécanique et d'aérotechnique and M.Sc. Fluid Mechanics & Thermodynamics from Attestation d`Eludes Approfondies, Universite de Poitiers both in 1971 and M.Sc. in Internal Combustion Engines from École Nationale Supérieure du Pétrole et des Moteurs in 1972.

He worked as an intern in Alsace Mechanical Industries until 1976, when he returned to Iran. He worked at Tehran Metro as the operational director from 1976 to 1979.

== Career ==
Mir-Salim served as the national police chief following the Iranian Revolution. He was proposed by then president Abulhassan Banisadr in July 1980 as a candidate for the prime minister as a compromise candidate acceptable to both Banisadr and the Majlis dominated by the Islamic Republican Party. However, Banisadr was pressured to accept Mohammad-Ali Rajai instead. From 1981 to 1989, Mir-Salim was the advisor to then president Ayatollah Khamenei.

In the beginning of 1989, on the occasion of the death and funeral of Hirohito, the 124th Emperor of Japan who had ruled for over 60 years until he died on January 7, Mir-Salim and Hossein Saffar Harandi, a Member of Parliament and the Chairman of Parliament Committee on Agriculture, went to the Imperial Palace in Tokyo to attend the Rites of Imperial Funeral on February 24 with Mohammad Hossein Adeli, Ambassador Extraordinary Plenipotentiary in Japan, and his wife.

Mir-Salim was appointed Minister of Culture and Islamic Guidance in 1994. His tenure was characterized by a strongly conservative Islamist direction, aiming to stave off the "cultural onslaught" of Western culture and promote pious Islamic culture in its place, including through the use of repressive measures. The Ministry under his direction was particularly known for closing a number of reformist newspapers.

He was later appointed to the Expediency Discernment Council.

He is assistant professor of mechanical engineering at Amirkabir University of Technology, Tehran.

== Electoral history ==
Year	Election	Votes	%	Rank	Notes
2017	President	478,267	1.16%	3rd	Lost
2020	Parliament	892,318	48.45%	2nd	Won

== Personal life ==
According to Iranian Diplomacy, Mirsalim is married to an Iranian woman. He is fond of swimming and usually wears shenandoah beard, collarless tuxedos and dark calottes that serve as his signature look.

Police appointments
Preceded by Mostafa Mostafaei	Commander of Shahrbani; Acting; 1980–1981	Succeeded by Houshang Vahid-Dastjerdi
Sporting positions
Preceded by Ahmad Ghoreishi	President of the Life Saving and Diving Federation of Iran; 1989–2017	Succeeded by Ilkhan Nouri
Political offices
Preceded by Sadeq Tabatabaei	Vice Minister of Interior for Socio-Political Affairs; 1979–1980; 1981–1982	Succeeded by Mohammad-Hossein Sarvaroddin
Preceded by Mohammad-Hossein Sarvaroddin	Vice Minister of Interior for Socio-Political Affairs; 1979–1980; 1981–1982	Succeeded by Abbas Ahmad Akhoundi
Unknown	Deputy Minister of Interior; 1981–1982	Unknown
New title	Supervisor of Presidential administration 1982–1989	Succeeded by Hamid Mirzadeh
New title	Top Advisor to the President of Iran; 1982–1989	Vacant Title next held by Mir-Hossein Mousavi
New title	Advisor to the President of Iran for Research; 1989–1994	Succeeded by Hassan Ghafourifard
Preceded by Mohammad-Reza Hashemi	Secretary of Supreme Council of the Cultural Revolution; 1993–1997	Succeeded by Mohammad-Ali Key-Nejad
Preceded by Ali Larijani	Minister of Culture and Islamic Guidance; 1994–1997	Succeeded by Ata'ollah Mohajerani
Academic offices
New title	Chairman of the Board of Encyclopaedia of the World of Islam; 1983–present	Incumbent
Preceded by Nasrollah Pourjavady	Managing-Director of Encyclopaedia of the World of Islam; 1990–1995	Succeeded by Gholam-Ali Haddad-Adel
Unknown	Vice President of Center for Strategic Research for Socio-Cultural Affairs; 1999–2006	Succeeded by Reza Salehi Amiri
Party political offices
New title	Head of Islamic Coalition Party's Central Council; 2004–2018; 2019–present	Succeeded by Asadollah Badamchian
Preceded by Asadollah Badamchian	Head of Islamic Coalition Party's Central Council; 2004–2018; 2019–present	Incumbent
Preceded by Asadollah Badamchian	Deputy Head of the Islamic Coalition Party's Central Council; 2018–2019	Succeeded by Hamidreza Taraghi
Preceded by Yahya Ale Eshaq	Islamic Coalition Party nominee for President of Iran; 2017	Most recent
