= Mohammad-Ali Rajai =

President of Iran in 1981

- محمدعلی رجایی
- Official portrait, 1981

President of Iran
- In office 2 August 1981 – 30 August 1981
- Supreme Leader: Ruhollah Khomeini
- Prime Minister: Himself; Mohammad-Javad Bahonar
- Preceded by: Abolhassan Banisadr (Note: Between Abolhassan Banisadr’s impeachment on 22 June and Mohammad-Ali Rajai’s election on 24 July and his swearing into office on 2 August, the Interim Presidential Council was tasked with handing the duties of the president.)
- Succeeded by: Ali Khamenei (Note: Between Mohammad-Ali Rajai’s death on 30 August and Ali Khamenei’s election on 2 October and his swearing into office on 9 October, the Interim Presidential Council was tasked with handing the duties of the president.)

Prime Minister of Iran
- In office 12 August 1980 – 4 August 1981
- Supreme Leader: Ruhollah Khomeini
- President: Abolhassan Banisadr; Himself
- Preceded by: Mehdi Bazargan (1979)
- Succeeded by: Mohammad Javad Bahonar

Minister of Foreign Affairs of Iran Acting
- In office 11 March 1981 – 15 August 1981
- President: Abolhassan Banisadr
- Prime Minister: Himself
- Preceded by: Karim Khodapanahi (Acting)
- Succeeded by: Mir-Hossein Mousavi

Minister of Education of Iran
- In office November 1979 – 28 May 1980
- Prime Minister: Mehdi Bazargan
- Preceded by: Gholam-Hossein Shokouhi
- Succeeded by: Mohammad Javad Bahonar

Member of the Parliament of Iran
- In office 28 May 1980 – 1 August 1981
- Constituency: Tehran, Rey, Shemiranat, Eslamshahr and Pardis
- Majority: 1,209,012 (56.6%)

Head of Mostazafan Foundation
- In office 17 September 1980 – 30 August 1981
- Appointed by: Ruhollah Khomeini
- Preceded by: Alinaghi Khamoushi
- Succeeded by: Mir-Hossein Mousavi

Personal details
- Born: 15 June 1933 Qazvin, Pahlavi Iran
- Died: 30 August 1981 (aged 48) Tehran, Iran
- Cause of death: Assassination by bombing
- Resting place: Behesht-e Zahra, Tehran
- Party: Islamic Republican Party; Islamic Association of Teachers of Iran
- Other political affiliations: Freedom Movement (until 1979); People's Mojahedin (until 1975)
- Spouse: Ateghe Sediqi (m. 1958)
- Children: 3
- Education: Tarbiat Moallem University

Mohammad-Ali Rajai (Persian: محمدعلی رجایی; 15 June 1933 – 30 August 1981) was an Iranian politician who served as the president of Iran from 2 August 1981 until his assassination four weeks later. Before his presidency, Rajai had served as prime minister under Abolhassan Banisadr, while concurrently occupying the position of foreign affairs minister from 11 March 1981 to 15 August 1981. He died in a bombing on 30 August 1981 along with then-prime minister Mohammad-Javad Bahonar.

== Early life and education ==
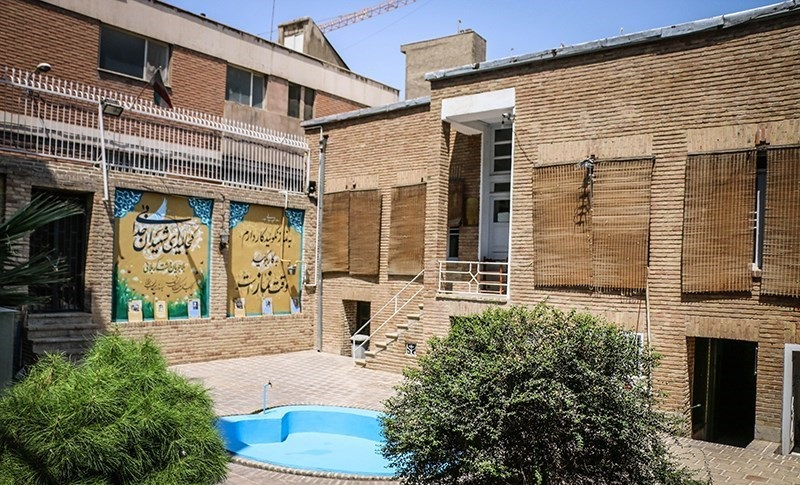
Rajai's house in Baharestan, Tehran

Mohammad-Ali Rajai was born on 15 June 1933 in Qazvin, Iran. His father, a shopkeeper named Abdolsamad, died when he was four years old. Rajai grew up in Qazvin and moved to Tehran in the late 1940s. He joined the Air Force at age sixteen or seventeen. In 1959, he graduated from Tarbiat Moallem University with a degree in education, later working as a teacher of mathematics.

== Political career ==
After moving to Tehran, Rajai became involved in the anti-Shah movement and associated with Mahmoud Taleghani and the Fadayeen-e Islam group. A one-time member of the largely anti-clerical People's Mujahedin of Iran (MEK), Rajai soon came out against its left-leaning ideals and in 1960, joined the Freedom Movement of Iran. He was arrested at least twice by SAVAK for his opposition activities, with his longest detention lasting from May 1974 to late 1978. Later in a 1980 speech to the United Nations Security Council, Rajai displayed his beaten right foot to the audience, attributing its condition to being tortured by the Shah's interrogators in prison.

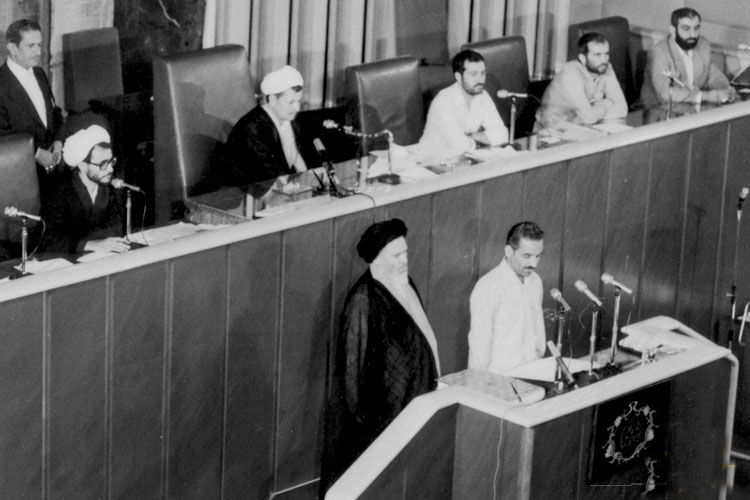
Rajai's presidential inauguration at the Majles

Following the Iranian Revolution in 1979, Rajai left the Freedom Movement and was appointed the minister of education in an Interim Government led by Mehdi Bazargan. Using his newfound power, Rajai sought the rapid Islamization of Iranian schools by banning the teaching of English, removing courses thought to be "non-Islamic", closing universities to prevent potential student dissent, and firing teachers with whom he disagreed.

Although the Interim Government of Iran resigned on 6 November 1979 as a result of the Iran hostage crisis, Rajai remained in his post until 12 August 1980, when he was appointed prime minister by newly-elected president Abolhassan Banisadr, who was under pressure from the dominant Islamic Republican Party. Rajai set up his cabinet by selecting Karim Khodapanahi as foreign affairs minister, Mohammad-Reza Mahdavi Kani as interior minister, and Javad Fakoori as defense minister. Just a month into Rajai's premiership on 22 September 1980, the Iran–Iraq War began.

=== Presidency ===
Banisadr was impeached on 21 June 1981 by the Iranian Parliament, allegedly because of his moves against the clerics in power. Ruhollah Khomeini, acting as Supreme Leader, held a Provisional Presidential Council of six people headed by Mohammad Beheshti and later Abdolkarim Mousavi Ardebili. Rajai, a member of the Council, nominated himself for the presidential election in 1981, running as a member of the Islamic Republican Party. By winning 91% of the votes, Rajai officially became the president after taking the Oath of Office on 2 August 1981. In one of his first acts in office, he named Mohammad-Javad Bahonar to become the next prime minister of Iran.

== Assassination ==
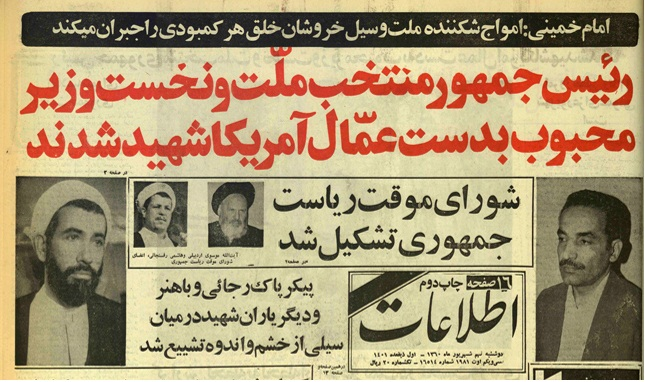
News of Rajai and Prime Minister Mohammad-Javad Bahonar's assassination from Ettela'at

On 30 August 1981, Rajai held a meeting of Iran's Supreme Defence Council along with Bahonar. Witnesses later stated that a trusted aide brought a briefcase into the conference room, set it between the two leaders, and then left. A short period later, another person opened the case, triggering a hidden bomb that set the room ablaze, leading to the deaths of Rajai, Bahonar, and six other officials. The attack occurred two months after the Haft-e Tir bombing. Iranian officials identified MEK operative Massoud Keshmiri as the culprit, though others allege the bombing was by political rivals within Rajai's political party. He is buried in Behesht-e Zahra cemetery.

== Political positions ==
Rajai based his governance on political Islam. He insisted that government members be Muslim, adhere to the concept of Velayat-e Faqih, and cooperate with institutions such as the Islamic Revolutionary Guard and the Islamic Revolutionary Court.

== Notes ==
Political offices
Preceded by Mehdi Bazargan	Prime Minister of Iran; 1980–1981	Succeeded by Mohammad Javad Bahonar
Preceded by Karim Khodapanahi (Acting)	Minister of Foreign Affairs (Acting); 1981	Succeeded by Mir-Hossein Mousavi
Preceded by Abulhassan Banisadr	President of Iran; 1981	Succeeded by Ali Khamenei
Party political offices
Preceded by Hassan Habibi	Islamic Republican Party nominee for President of Iran; July 1981	Succeeded by Ali Khamenei
