= Habibollah Asgaroladi =

Iranian politician (1932–2013)

- حبيب‌الله عسگراولادی
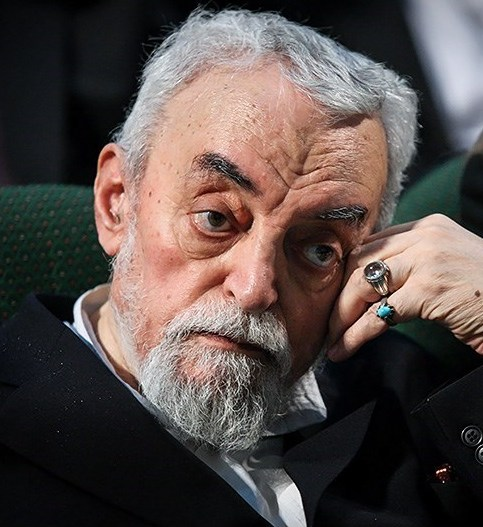
- Asgaroladi in 2012

Minister of Commerce
- In office 17 August 1981 – 2 August 1983
- Prime Minister: Mohammad-Javad Bahonar; Mohammad-Reza Mahdavi; Mir-Hossein Mousavi
- Preceded by: Kazam Pour-Ardabili
- Succeeded by: Hossein Abedi Jafari

Member of the Parliament of Iran
- In office 28 May 1980 – 3 November 1980
- Constituency: Tehran, Rey and Shemiranat
- Majority: 764,338 (46.7%)

Personal details
- Born: 2 May 1932 Tehran, Imperial State of Iran
- Died: 5 November 2013 (aged 81) Tehran, Iran
- Party: Islamic Coalition Party

Habibollah Asgaroladi Mosalman (Persian: حبيب‌الله عسگراولادی مسلمان; 3 January 1932 – 5 November 2013) was a leading senior Iranian conservative and principlist politician who was the leader of Islamic Coalition Party, a highly influential conservative political party in Iran. He was also a Vice President and two-time presidential candidate, first in July 1981 and next in 1985. During his 1981 bid, he was the target of a failed assassination attempt that killed his bodyguard but left him mostly unharmed.

== Career and activities ==
Asgaroladi was born to a wealthy merchant family in Damavand. His ancestors were Jews who converted to Shia Islam. Asgaroladi was a senior member of Iran's Expediency Council. He spent many years at the forefront of the Iranian cabinet and as First Vice President, serving as both Secretary of State for Social Security, Minister for Economy, Trade and Commerce as well as heading the Homeland Security Agency and intelligence services in Iran. He ran in the 1981 and 1985 Presidential elections. An attempt was made on his life in a failed assassination attempt in 1981. Asgaroladi was a prominent member of Khomeini's inner circle and returned to Iran from Neuphle-le-Chateau with Araghi & Beheshti. Since the Islamic Revolution of 1979, he was chosen by Khomeini to be the founding father of the Khomeini Relief Foundation, the largest social welfare branch of the government in Iran. Some unofficial reports include him among the wealthiest individuals in Iran with a net worth of several billion dollars. Several members of the Asgaroladi family have been featured in the Fortune 500 ("Millionaire Mullahs" article), with Asadollah Asgaroladi possessing an estimated wealth of over US$9 billion. The Asgaroladis are now amongst the wealthiest families in Iran with commercial interests in real estate, banking, healthcare and exports of dried fruits, nuts, caviar and saffron.

Asgaroladi published his autobiography in 2012 and was presented with an award by Ali Larijani, speaker of the Iranian Parliament. He died on 5 November 2013 in Tehran's Dey Hospital after being hospitalized for more than two months. His funeral was attended by the Supreme Leader Khamenei, President Hassan Rouhani, Mohsen Rafiqdoost, Ali Larijani and many other senior government officials.

== See also ==
- Asadollah Asgaroladi

Assembly seats
Preceded by Mohammad Mousavi Khoeiniha	2nd Vice Speaker of Parliament of Iran; 1981	Succeeded by Mohammad Yazdi
Party political offices
New title	Secretary-General of Islamic Coalition Party; 1987–2004	Succeeded by Mohammad Nabi Habibi
