= Islamic Coalition Party =

Islamic Coalition Party حزب مؤتلفه اسلامی
- Secretary-General: Mohammad-Ali Amani
- Spiritual leader: Ruhollah Khomeini (deceased)
- Deputy Secretary-General: Mohammad-Ali Amani
- Head of Central Council: Mostafa Mir-Salim
- Political deputy: Mohammad-Kazem Anbarlouei
- Founded: April 1963; 63 years ago
- Legalised: December 11, 1990; 35 years ago
- Headquarters: Tehran, Iran
- Newspaper: Shoma; Resalat (1986–1997)
- Guild wing: Union of Islamic Associations of Guilds and Bazaaris
- Ideology: Conservatism (Iranian); Theocracy (Iranian); Shia Islamism; Traditionalism; Laissez-faire; Social conservatism; Fiscal conservatism; Iranian nationalism; Historical Faction: Islamic socialism
- Political position: Right-wing to far-right
- Religion: Shia Islam
- National affiliation: Front of Followers of the Line of the Imam and the Leader; Coordination Council of Islamic Revolution Forces
- Continental affiliation: International Conference of Asian Political Parties (ICAPP)
- Electoral alliances: Grand Coalition (1980s); Alliance of Builders (2004); United Front of Principlists (2008, 2012); Principlists Grand Coalition (2016)
- Colors: Islamic green
- Parliament: 3 / 290

The Islamic Coalition Party (Note: Named "Islamic Mourning Groups Coalition" (Persian: هیئت‌های مؤتلفه اسلامی, romanized: hayʾathâ-ye moʾtalefe-ye eslâmi) from 1963 to 1979 and "Islamic Coalition Society" (Persian: جمعیت مؤتلفه اسلامی, romanized: jamʿiyat-e moʾtalefe-ye eslâmi) from 1979 to 2004.) (ICP; Persian: حزب مؤتلفه اسلامی, romanized: ḥezb-e moʾtalefe-ye eslāmi) is a conservative political party in Iran.

The ICP is the pivotal organization within Front of Followers of the Line of the Imam and the Leader and is considered a lay ally of the influential Combatant Clergy Association. Though still very active and influential, the organization experienced a gradual elimination from political power after rise of new conservative rivals in the 2000s and some analysts dismiss it as something of a dinosaur heading for extinction.

One of the oldest among the active parties in Iran, the coalition represents older generations of conservatives, and its main base of support is among bazaari merchants and shopkeepers in Grand Bazaar of Tehran and other cities, petite bourgeoisie, and traditionalist clerics. It is probably the only political organization in Iran which possesses an organic relation with such a social base.

Morteza Motahhari, a member of the party who, unlike many of its other members, was an Islamic socialist, served as Chairman (Head) of the Council of the Islamic Revolution from 1978 to 1979. Since 1979, ICP members have held high government offices and are influential players in the economy of Iran, dominating Iran Chamber of Commerce Industries and Mines (ICCIM) and having "a say in the appointment of the minister of commerce". One recent example was Ali Larijani, who was regarded as the de facto head of state of Iran from late December 2025 until his assassination during the 2026 Iran war. Unlike the mainstream line of the party, Larijani supported pragmatism and was influenced by Deng's model of China. However he was also critical of excessive state involvement in the economy. The party has also interactions with Mostazafan Foundation, Imam Khomeini Relief Foundation and Mashhad-based Astan Quds Razavi.

The ICP is affiliated with parochial schools for boys and girls.

== History ==
The ICP played a vital role in the success of the Iranian Revolution. Following the revolution, it reduced its activities many members joined the Islamic Republic Party as leading members, resuming its activities after the latter's dissolution in 1987. The party had some 90 parliamentary seats in 2006, according to Mohsen Sazegara.

== International affairs ==
The ICP has an office for its international affairs headed by Mehdi Soli, succeeding Hamidreza Taraghi. The party held a forum on unity of Islamic parties in 2015, participated by Hezbollah among others. It sent congratulations to the 12th National Congress of the Communist Party of Vietnam and also maintains good relations with the Chinese Communist Party, as well as the Workers' Party of Korea and government of North Korea.

== Leaders ==
Secretaries-general (chief)
| Name | Tenure | Ref |
|---|---|---|
| Habibollah Asgaroladi | 1987–2004 | |
| Mohammad Nabi Habibi | 2004–2019 | |
| Asadollah Badamchian | 2019–2025 | |
| Mohammad-Ali Amani | 2025–present | |

Deputy secretaries-general
| Name | Tenure | Ref |
|---|---|---|
| Ali Akbar Parvaresh | 1993–2001 | |
| Asadollah Badamchian | 2001–2012 | |
| Mohammad-Ali Amani | 2012– | |

Heads of Central Council
| Name | Tenure | Ref |
|---|---|---|
| Mostafa Mir-Salim | 2004–2018 | |
| Asadollah Badamchian | 2018–2019 | |
| Mostafa Mir-Salim | 2019– | |

== See also ==
- List of Islamic political parties
