= Iranian legislative election, 2004 (Tehran, Rey, Shemiranat and Eslamshahr) =

2004/2005 legislative election
← 2001	20 February 2004 / 17 June 2005	2008 →
- Registered: 6,047,572
- Turnout: 32.50%
Alliance	Alliance of Builders of Islamic Iran	Coalition For Iran
Seats won	29 / 30	1 / 30

This is an overview of the 2004 Iranian legislative election in Tehran, Rey, Shemiranat and Eslamshahr electoral district. Alliance of Builders of Islamic Iran was able to win 29 out of 30 seats in the constituency in the first round.

A total number of 1,965,666 votes were cast in the first round.

== Results ==
=== First round ===
The official results are as follows:

#	Candidate	Main list	Votes	%
↓ Elected Members ↓
1	Gholam-Ali Haddad-Adel	Alliance of Builders of Islamic Iran	888,276	45.05
2	Ahmad Tavakoli	Alliance of Builders of Islamic Iran	776,979	39.4
3	Amir Reza Khadem	Alliance of Builders of Islamic Iran	693,603	35.18
4	Mohammad-Mehdi Tabatabaei	Alliance of Builders of Islamic Iran	660,764	33.51
5	Ahmad Ahmadi	Alliance of Builders of Islamic Iran	611,190	31
6	Hossein Mozaffar	Alliance of Builders of Islamic Iran	589,091	29.87
7	Saeid Aboutaleb	Alliance of Builders of Islamic Iran	582,679	29.55
8	Nafiseh Fayyazbakhsh	Alliance of Builders of Islamic Iran	581,925	29.51
9	Mohammad Khoshchehreh	Alliance of Builders of Islamic Iran	578,674	29.35
10	Emad Afroogh	Alliance of Builders of Islamic Iran	567,939	28.80
11	Davoud Danesh-Jafari	Alliance of Builders of Islamic Iran	563,506	28.58
12	Alireza Zakani	Alliance of Builders of Islamic Iran	548,524	27.82
13	Laleh Eftekhari	Alliance of Builders of Islamic Iran	535,169	27.14
14	Fazlollah Mousavi	Alliance of Builders of Islamic Iran	530,301	26.89
15	Fatemeh Alia	Alliance of Builders of Islamic Iran	527,448	
16	Hossein Nejabat	Alliance of Builders of Islamic Iran	526,968	26.72
17	Hossein Sheikholeslam	Alliance of Builders of Islamic Iran	524,568	26.6
18	Elham Aminzadeh	Alliance of Builders of Islamic Iran	521,782	26.46
19	Abbas-Ali Akhtari	Alliance of Builders of Islamic Iran	519,809	26.36
20	Seyyed Ali Riaz	Alliance of Builders of Islamic Iran	519,166	26.33
21	Fatemeh Rahbar	Alliance of Builders of Islamic Iran	517,743	26.26
22	Elyas Naderan	Alliance of Builders of Islamic Iran	516,000	26.2
23	Hamid Reza Katouzian	Alliance of Builders of Islamic Iran	514,331	26.08
24	Parviz Sorouri	Alliance of Builders of Islamic Iran	503,638	25.54
25	Manouchehr Mottaki	Alliance of Builders of Islamic Iran	493,214	25.01
↓ Went to Run-off ↓
26	Mehdi Kouchakzadeh	Alliance of Builders of Islamic Iran	491,978	
27	Gholamreza Mesbahi-Moghadam	Alliance of Builders of Islamic Iran	491,598	
28	Hossein Fadaei	Alliance of Builders of Islamic Iran	489,931	
29	Zeinab Kadkhoda	Alliance of Builders of Islamic Iran	472,208	
30	Ali Abbaspour Tehrani-Fard	Alliance of Builders of Islamic Iran	431,256	
31	Alireza Mahjoub	Coalition For Iran	207,030	
32	Hassan Ghafourifard	Coalition of Iran's Independent Volunteers	193,756	
33	Soheila Jolodarzadeh	Coalition For Iran	173,782	
34	Majid Ansari	Coalition For Iran	173,650	
35	Ali Abbaspour Tehrani-Asl	Coalition For Iran	140,311	
↓ Defeated ↓
36	Jamileh Kadivar	Coalition For Iran	116,650	
37	Mahmoud Doayi	Coalition For Iran	74,657	
38	Elaheh Rastgou	Coalition For Iran	74,111	
39	Hassan Mir-Mohammad-Sadeghi	Coalition For Iran	71,209	
40	Mohammad Reza Abbasifard	Coalition For Iran	69,837	
41	Mohammad Ashrafi-Esfahani	Coalition For Iran	66,187	
42	Majid Ghassemi	Coalition For Iran	61,521	
43	Ali Hashemi-Rafsanjani	Coalition For Iran	58,950	
44	Elias Hazrati	Coalition For Iran	56,363	
45	Hassan Bolkhari	Coalition of Iran's Independent Volunteers	33,907	
46	Ali Jazini	Coalition of Iran's Independent Volunteers	32,569	
47	Taha Hashemi	Moderation and Development Party	33,907	
48	Mohammad Karbaschi	Unlisted	33,907	
49	Mohammad Tabatabaei	Unlisted	31,301	
50	Abolfazl Ehtesabi	Unlisted	30,937	
—	Mehdi Karoubi	Coalition For Iran	Withdrew	
—	Rasoul Montajabnia	Coalition For Iran	Withdrew	
Blank or Invalid Votes			Not announced	
Total Votes			1,971,748	100

=== Guardian council intervention and run-off (2005) ===
17 June 2005

The 30th seat for Tehran, Rey, Shemiranat, Eslamshahr and Pardis
- Turnout: 2,555,455 votes cast
Candidate	Alireza Mahjoub	Zeinab Kadkhoda
Party	WH	IAPI
Alliance	CCRF	ABII
Popular vote	1,355,673	≈777,000
Percentage	≈53%	≈30%
Subsequent MP
Alireza Mahjoub

After the official results were declared by the Ministry of Interior, the Alliance of Builders of Islamic Iran protested. On 16 March 2004, the Guardian Council decreed that 29 candidates are elected, instead of 25 and only 2 candidates made it to the run-off, instead of 10. There was a confusing similarity between the conservative "Ali Abbaspour Tehrani Fard" of Alliance of Builders of Islamic Iran —who was initially ranked 30th with 431,256 votes— and the reformist "Ali Abbaspour Tehrani Asl" listed by the Coalition For Iran, with 140,311 votes. Abbaspour Tehrani Fard was promoted to the 12th place.

News Website Jamaran cites the recounted votes as below:

#	Candidate	Votes	Recounted votes	%	New Rank
26	Mehdi Kouchakzadeh	491,978	▲501,676	25.44	26
27	Gholamreza Mesbahi	491,598	▲496,468	25.18	27
28	Hossein Fadaei	489,931	▲496,165	25.16	28
30	Ali Abbaspour Tehrani-Fard	431,256	▲552,291	28.01	▲12

The run-off election was scheduled to be held on 7 May 2004 between the reformist Alireza Mahjoub and the conservative Zeinab Kadkhoda. The Iranian Parliament passed a bill to postpone the elections, due to the vastness of the constituency and its expenses. It was held along with the presidential election on 17 June 2005.
