= 2000 Iranian legislative election in Tehran, Rey, Shemiranat, and Eslamshahr =

2000 Iranian legislative election
- 18 February 2000

All 30 seats for Tehran, Rey, Shemiranat and Eslamshahr
- Registered: 5,242,993
- Turnout: 55.91%
Votes cast	2,931,113

This is an overview of the 2000 Iranian legislative election in Tehran, Rey, Shemiranat and Eslamshahr electoral district.

== Results ==
=== First round ===
Official results declared by the Ministry of Interior are as follows:

#	Candidate	Electoral lists								Votes	%
#	Candidate	IIPF	ACC	OSU	CNR	ECP	MDP	FFLIL	SDIR	Votes	%
↓ Elected Members ↓
1	Mohammad Reza Khatami	Yes	Yes	Yes	Yes	—N/a				1,794,365	61.21
2	Jamileh Kadivar	Yes	Yes	—N/a	Yes	Yes	—N/a			1,377,746	47
3	Alireza Noori	Yes	—N/a		Yes	Yes	—N/a			1,343,520	45.83
4	Mohsen Armin	Yes	Yes	—N/a	Yes	—N/a				1,224,421	41.77
5	Hadi Khamenei	Yes	Yes	Yes	—N/a	Yes	—N/a			1,223,884	41.77
6	Mohsen Mirdamadi	Yes	Yes	Yes	—N/a					1,188,309	40.54
7	Majid Ansari	Yes	Yes	—N/a		Yes	—N/a			1,173,534	40.30
8	Behzad Nabavi	Yes	Yes	Yes	—N/a	Yes	—N/a			1,148,840	39.19
9	Ahmad Bourghani	Yes	—N/a	Yes	Yes	—N/a				1,1393,65	38.87
10	Soheila Jolodarzadeh	Yes	Yes	—N/a		Yes	Yes	—N/a		1,119,735	38.20
11	Davoud Soleimani	Yes	—N/a		Yes	—N/a				1,081,119	36.88
12	Ahmad Pournejati	Yes	Yes	—N/a						1,070,122	36.20
13	Elaheh Koulaei	Yes	—N/a	Yes	—N/a					1,054,003	35.95
14	Ali Shakouri Rad	Yes	—N/a							1,053,686	35.94
15	Ali Akbar Mousavi Khoeini	Yes	—N/a		Yes	—N/a				1,052,344	35.90
16	Vahideh Taleghani	Yes	—N/a							1,047,096	35.72
17	Mohsen Safaei Farahani	Yes	Yes	—N/a		Yes	—N/a			1,038,602	35.43
18	Meysam Saeidi	Yes	—N/a	Yes	Yes	—N/a				1,025,495	34.98
19	Shamseddin Vahabi	Yes	Yes	—N/a						988,594	33.72
20	Fatemeh Haghighatjoo	Yes	Yes	Yes	—N/a					988,564	33.72
21	Behrouz Afkhami	Yes	—N/a							973,727	33.22
22	Mohammad Naeimipour	Yes	Yes	—N/a						941,697	32.12
23	Abolghasem Sarhaddizadeh	Yes	Yes	—N/a		Yes	—N/a			926,054	31.59
24	Fatemeh Rakeei	Yes	—N/a							896,573	30.58
25	Mehdi Karoubi	Yes	Yes	—N/a			Yes	—N/a		892,640	30.45
26	Mahmoud Doayi	Yes	Yes	—N/a			Yes	—N/a		889,986	30.36
27	Rasoul Montajabnia	Yes	Yes	—N/a						782,438	26.69
28	Alireza Rajaei	—N/a		Yes	Yes	—N/a				771,677	26.32
29	Elias Hazrati	—N/a	Yes	—N/a						756,266	25.80
30	Akbar Hashemi Rafsanjani	—N/a				Yes	Yes	Yes	Yes	749,884	25.58
↓ Defeated ↓
31	Ali-Akbar Rahmani	Yes	Yes	—N/a						737,976	25.17
32	Ali Akbar Mohtashamipur	Yes	Yes	—N/a					Yes	717,076	24.46
33	Gholam-Ali Haddad-Adel	—N/a				Yes	Yes	Yes	Yes	669,547	22.84
34	Hossein Hashemian	—N/a	Yes	Yes	—N/a	Yes	—N/a			632,692	21.58
35	Gohar Dastgheib	Yes	Yes	—N/a						610,076	20.81
36	Mohsen Rezaee	—N/a	Yes	—N/a		Yes	—N/a	Yes	Yes	539,796	18.41
37	Alireza Marandi	—N/a						Yes	Yes	512,516	17.48
38	Mahmoud Omrani-Tabarestani	—N/a			Yes	—N/a				505,640	17.25
39	Abbas Sheibani	—N/a					Yes	Yes	Yes	504,248	17.20
40	Hassan Rouhani	—N/a				Yes	Yes	Yes	Yes	498,916	17.02
41	Mohammad Reza Bahonar	—N/a						Yes	Yes	451,343	15.39
...	Data not available	—N/a									
51	Ahmad Tavakoli	—N/a						Yes	Yes	382,867	13.06
52	Morteza Nabavi	—N/a						Yes	Yes	376,051	12.82
53	Faezeh Hashemi Rafsanjani	—N/a				Yes	Yes	—N/a		366,202	12.49
54	Yahya Ale Eshaq	—N/a					Yes	Yes	—N/a	351,850	12.00
55	Monireh Nobakht	—N/a						Yes	Yes	346,524	11.82
56	Ali Movahedi-Savoji	—N/a						Yes	Yes	344,897	11.76
57	Ali Abbaspour	—N/a					Yes	Yes	Yes	342,248	11.67
58	Shahabedin Sadr	—N/a						Yes	Yes	336,349	11.47
59	Reza Taghavi	—N/a						Yes	Yes	332,797	11.35
60	Saeed Madani	—N/a			Yes	—N/a				327,546	11.17
61	Reza Akrami	—N/a					Yes	Yes	—N/a	327,122	11.16
62	Davoud Danesh-Jafari	—N/a						Yes	Yes	315,827	10.77
63	Gholamhossein Elham	—N/a						Yes	Yes	305,833	10.43
64	Fatemeh Rahbar	—N/a						Yes	—N/a	291,249	9.93
65	Fatemeh Farhangkhah	—N/a			Yes	—N/a				289,476	9.87
66	Mohammad Behzadi	—N/a			Yes	—N/a				287,290	9.80
67	Mohammad Reza Sarshar	—N/a					Yes	Yes	Yes	285,923	9.78
68	Mahmoud Ahmadinejad	—N/a						Yes	Yes	280,046	9.55
Blank or Invalid Votes											
Total Votes										2,931,113	100

=== Second round ===
#	Candidate	Party	Votes	%
1	Elias Hazrati	Islamic Iran Solidarity Party	79,081	49.88
2	Ali Akbar Mohtashamipur	Association of Combatant Clerics	68,276	43.07
3	Ali-Akbar Rahmani	Islamic Iran Participation Front	65,819	41.52
4	Rasoul Montajabnia	Association of Combatant Clerics	47,436	29.92
Blank votes			10,857	6.84
Invalid votes			18,699	11.79
Valid votes			139,812	88.20
Total Votes			158,511	100
Source: IRNA

== Analysis ==
15 electoral lists were issued for 30 seats in Tehran, Rey, Shemiranat and Eslamshahr electoral district, endorsing a total of 113 individuals. The 113 listed candidates received an average of 437,459 votes, while 723 unlisted candidates received only 5,524 on average.

Average votes received by each list in Tehran, Rey, Shemiranat and Eslamshahr electoral district
List	Average votes*
Islamic Iran Participation Front	1,049,891
2nd of Khordad Press	1,032,847
Office for Strengthening Unity	963,619
Association of Combatant Clerics	792,630
Worker House	650,733
Executives of Construction Party	631,597
Association of the Women of the Islamic Republic	598,820
Society of Researchers	476,650
Independence Party of Iran	454,204
Moderation and Development Party	427,508
Combatant Clergy Association	396,376
Society of Devotees of the Islamic Revolution	386,379
Islamic Society of Students	379,938
Islamic Civilization Party	360,825
Summit of Freethinkers	263,826
*Average votes is the arithmetic mean of total votes received by all candidates listed.

== Notes and references ==
- آمار مقایسه‌ای نتایج انتخابات مجلس ششم و هفتم (PDF), Ministry of Interior (in Persian)
