= Iranian legislative election, 1996 (Tehran, Rey, Shemiranat and Eslamshahr) =

1996 parliamentary election
← 1992	8 March 1996	2000 →

All 30 seats for Tehran, Rey, Shemiranat and Eslamshahr
Alliance	Combatant Clergy and Islamic Aligned Organizations	Executives of Construction	Coalition of Imam's Line groups
Seats won	22 / 30	14 / 30	4 / 30

This is an overview of the 1996 Iranian legislative election in Tehran, Rey, Shemiranat and Eslamshahr electoral district.

== Results ==
=== First round ===
#	Candidate	Electoral list				Votes	%
#	Candidate	CIL	ECP	DRV	CCA	Votes	%
↓ Elected Members ↓
1	Ali Akbar Nategh-Nouri	—	check	check	check	879,893	35.99
2	Faezeh Hashemi Rafsanjani	—	check	—		852,609	34.87
↓ Went to Run-off ↓
3	Ali-Akbar Aboutorabi	—		check	check	804,057	32.89
4	Abbas Sheibani	—	check	—	check	764,978	31.29
5	Ali-Akbar Hosseini	—		check	check	683,076	27.94
6	Marzieh Vahid-Dastjerdi	—	check	check	check	616,223	25.21
7	Mohsen Mojtahed Shabestari	—	check	check	check	586,351	23.98
8	Hassan Rouhani	—	check	check	check	577,964	23.64
9	Mohammad-Reza Bahonar	—		check	check	571,719	23.39
10	Ali Movahedi-Kermani	—	check	check	check	552,586	22.61
11	Mohammad-Javad Larijani	—			check	544,266	22.27
12	Abolghasem Sarhaddizadeh	check	check	check	—	498,889	20.41
13	Ghorbanali Dorri-Najafabadi	—	check	check	check	485,332	19.85
14	Mahmoud Doayi	—	check	—	check	475,201	19.44
15	Soheila Jolodarzadeh	—	check	—		473,062	19.35
16	Abdollah Nouri	check	check	check	—	447,634	18.31
17	Mohammad Asghari	—	check	—	check	442,666	18.11
18	Alireza Mahjoub	—	check	check	—	440,396	18.02
19	Nafiseh Fayyazbakhsh	—			check	417,748	17.09
20	Mostafa Moein	check	check	check	—	386,442	15.81
21	Fatemeh Ramezanzadeh	check	check	check	—	381,199	15.59
22	Mohsen Yahyavi	—		check	check	379,672	15.53
23	Habibollah Asgaroladi	—		check	check	371,225	15.19
24	Hassan Ghafourifard	—				363,675	14.88
25	Morteza Nabavi	—		check	check	351,386	14.38
26	Monireh Nobakht	—		check	check	348,472	14.26
27	Reza Akrami	—		check	check	348,048	14.24
28	Parvin Salihi	—			check	339,747	13.90
29	Ali Movahedi-Savoji	—			check	337,717	13.82
30	Shahabedin Sadr	—		check	check	335,556	13.73
31	Ali Abbaspour	—			check	325,850	13.33
32	Majid Ansari	check	check	check	—	303,442	12.41
33	Reza Taghavi	—		check	check	298,778	12.22
34	Mousa Zargar	—			check	289,213	11.83
35	Morteza Alviri	—	check	—		286,406	11.72
35	Alinaghi Khamoushi	—			check	283,345	11.59
37	Reza Malekzadeh	—	check	—		268,561	10.99
38	Gohar Dastgheib	check	—			263,663	10.79
39	Nasser Khaleghi	check	check	check	—	259,670	10.62
40	Maryam Behrouzi	—			check	257,293	10.53
41	Davoud Danesh-Jafari	—			check	250,956	10.27
42	Abolghasem Ashouri	—	check	—		236,958	9.69
43	Behzad Nabavi	check	—			234,006	9.57
44	Abdolhossein Moezzi	—		check	check	233,751	9.56
45	Asadollah Badamchian	—			check	225,820	9.24
46	Mohammad-Reza Taghavimanesh	—	check	—		204,856	8.38
47	Kazem Akrami	check	—	check	—	201,379	8.24
48	Mohammad Etemadi	—	check	—		200,921	8.22
49	Gholam-Ali Afrouz	—				199,405	8.16
50	Mehdi Hojjat	—	check	—		198,310	8.11
51	Mohammad-Hashem Rahbari	—	check	check	—	190,660	7.80
52	Esmaeil Mousavi-Koushki	—				181,817	7.44
53	Davoud Tajeran	—	check	—		179,042	7.32
54	Sedigheh Moghaddasi	—	check	—		153,678	6.29
55	Mohammad Salamati	check	—			138,405	5.66
56	Mohammad Rahmati	—	check	—		136,145	5.57
57	Mohammad-Mehdi Abdekhodaei	—		check	—	125,499	5.13
58	Fatemeh Noghani	—				124,079	5.08
↓ Defeated ↓
	Serajeddin Mousavi	check	check	—		Unknown	
	Abolhassan Ahmadiani	check	—			Unknown	
	Ali Shakouri-Rad	check	—			Unknown	
	Mohammad Ashrafi-Esfahani	check	—			Unknown	
	Rasoul Montajabnia	check	—			Unknown	
	Mohammad-Reza Vaez Mahdavi	check	—			Unknown	
	Seyed Mahmood Hosseini	check	—			Unknown	
	Davoud Soleimani	check	—			Unknown	
	Mehrdad Kokabi	check	—			Unknown	
	Morteza Haji	check	—			Unknown	
	Mohsen Poudineh	check	—			Unknown	
	Mir-Fazlollah Mousavi	check	—			Unknown	
	Saeed Hajarian	check	—			Unknown	
	Alireza Fallahi Arezoudar	check	—			Unknown	
	Fatemeh Nahidi	—		check	—	Unknown	
	Mohammad-Reza Mahdavi	—		check	—	Unknown	
	Rafat Bayat	—		check	—	Unknown	
↓ Withdrawn candidates ↓
	Ezatollah Sahabi	—				—	
	Abolfazl Bazargan	—				—	
	Mohammad Bastenegar	—				—	
	Gholam-Abbas Tavassoli	—				—	
Total Votes						2,444,415	100
Source: IRNA / Jam-e-Jam Online

=== Second round ===
#	Candidate	Electoral list				Votes	%
#	Candidate	CIL	ECP	DRV	CCA	Votes	%
↓ Elected Members ↓
1	Ali-Akbar Aboutorabi	—		check	check	683,597	47.76
2	Abbas Sheibani	—	check	—	check	665,091	46.46
3	Marzieh Vahid-Dastjerdi	—	check	check	check	588,710	41.13
4	Mohammad-Reza Bahonar	—		check	check	570,289	39.84
5	Ali-Akbar Hosseini	—		check	check	552,269	38.58
6	Hassan Ghafourifard	—				550,915	38.49
7	Mohsen Mojtahed Shabestari	—	check	check	check	536,197	37.46
8	Ali Movahedi-Kermani	—	check	check	check	500,008	34.93
9	Nafiseh Fayyazbakhsh	—			check	489,439	34.19
10	Ghorbanali Dorri-Najafabadi	—	check	check	check	477,417	33.35
11	Soheila Jolodarzadeh	—	check	—		475,400	33.21
12	Mohsen Yahyavi	—		check	check	467,910	32.69
13	Hassan Rouhani	—	check	check	check	465,902	32.55
14	Mahmoud Doayi	—	check	—	check	464,770	32.47
15	Abdollah Nouri	check	check	check	—	449,321	31.39
16	Monireh Nobakht	—		check	check	434,180	30.33
17	Alireza Mahjoub	—	check	check	—	411,431	28.74
18	Abolghasem Sarhaddizadeh	check	check	check	—	411,238	28.73
19	Reza Akrami	—		check	check	405,078	28.30
20	Mousa Zargar	—			check	400,709	27.99
21	Mohammad-Javad Larijani	—			check	398,897	27.87
22	Majid Ansari	check	check	check	—	397,022	27.74
23	Davoud Danesh-Jafari	—			check	393,719	27.51
24	Fatemeh Ramezanzadeh	check	check	check	—	389,046	27.18
25	Morteza Nabavi	—		check	check	387,734	27.09
26	Reza Taghavi	—		check	check	382,238	26.70
27	Ali Movahedi-Savoji	—			check	379,869	26.54
28	Shahabedin Sadr	—		check	check	372,883	26.05
Total Votes						1,431,431	100
Source: IRNA / Jam-e-Jam Online
