= 2001 Tehran, Rey, Shemiranat and Eslamshahr by-election =

2001 Tehran by-election
← 2000	8 June 2001	2004 →

The vacant seat for Tehran, Rey, Shemiranat and Eslamshahr Triggered by resignation of Akbar Hashemi Rafsanjani
Candidate	Alireza Mahjoub	Mohammad-Reza Rahchamani
Party	WH	IISP
Popular vote	657,872	445,834
Percentage	26.30%	17.82%
Candidate	Rasoul Montajabnia	Ali Abbaspour
Party	ACC	ICP
Popular vote	342,773	277,510
Percentage	13.70%	11.09%
Subsequent MP
Alireza Mahjoub

A by-election for the Islamic Consultative Assembly's constituency Tehran, Rey, Shemiranat and Eslamshahr was held on 8 June 2001, to fill the vacancy caused by resignation of Akbar Hashemi Rafsanjani after he had won in the election held the previous year. The voters in Tehran cast their ballots along with the 2001 Iranian presidential election.

Alireza Mahjoub of the Worker House won the election.

== Results ==
The top nine candidates who ran for the seats, were:

#	Candidate	Party	Votes	%
1	Alireza Mahjoub	Worker House	657,872	26.30
2	Mohammad-Reza Rahchamani	Islamic Iran Solidarity Party	445,834	17.82
3	Rasoul Montajabnia	Association of Combatant Clerics	342,773	13.70
4	Ali Abbaspour	Islamic Coalition Party	277,510	11.09
5	Hadi Khatami	Combatant Clergy Association	226,382	9.05
6	Rafat Bayat	Zeynab Society	126,030	5.03
7	Ali Jazani-Dorcheh	—	66,693	2.66
8	Mehraban Ganji	—	34,047	1.36
9	Arash Romina	—	19,133	0.07
Total Votes			2,501,004	100
Source: IRNA
