= Mir-Hossein Mousavi 2009 presidential campaign =

Political campaign in Iran

- Candidate: Mir-Hossein Mousavi; Former Prime Minister of Iran 1981-1989
- Affiliation: Iranian reform movement Green Movement
- Status: Lost election: 13 June 2009
- Headquarters: Tehran, Iran
- Key people: Ghorban Behzadian Nejad; Mohammad Khatami; Ali Akbar Mohtashamipur; Zahra Rahnavard
- Chant: A progressive Iran with law, justice and freedom
- Website: kalemeh.ir

Mir-Hossein Mousavi Khameneh (Persian: میرحسین موسوی خامنه) served as the last Prime Minister of Iran from 1981 to 1989, before the position was abolished in the 1989 constitutional review. In the years leading up to the Islamic Revolution, Mousavi and his wife, Zahra Rahnavard, moved to the United States. They returned shortly after the establishment of the Islamic Republic. Mousavi later ran for office in the 2009 Iranian presidential election, but lost to Mahmoud Ahmadinejad.

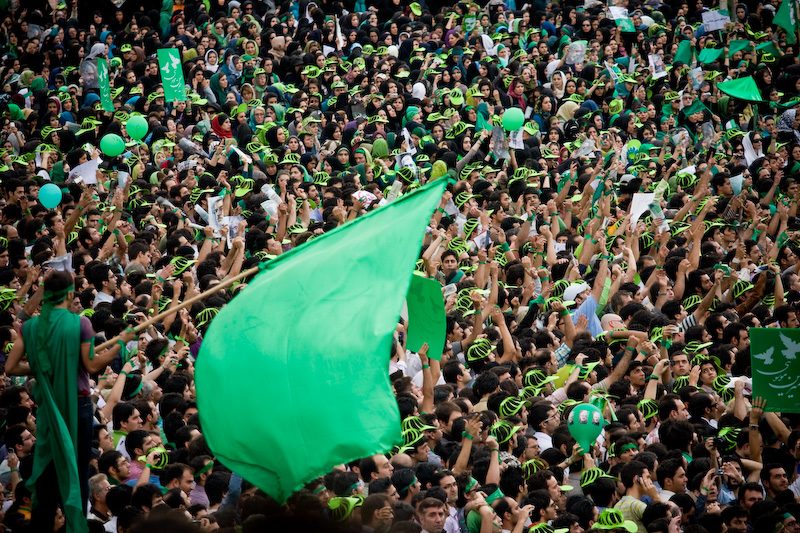
Mousavi supporters in Tehran in 2009

== Past elections ==
=== 1997 presidential election ===
Mousavi refused to run for president in the 1997 presidential election. As a result, reformists chose Mohammad Khatami, who won by a landslide. His wife would later explain in an interview that her husband did not run in the 1997 election because of discouraging messages from "higher officials", possibly referring to the Supreme Leader Ali Khamenei, or the president at the time, Akbar Hashemi Rafsanjani.

=== 2005 presidential election ===
Mousavi was considered a potential reformist candidate in the 2005 presidential election. However, on October 12, 2004, he announced he would not run. This decision came after a meeting with President Mohammad Khatami and the two other high-ranking members of the Association of Combatant Clerics, Mehdi Karroubi and Mohammad Mousavi-Khoiniha.

== 2009 presidential election ==
In the 2009 presidential election, Mousavi ran as an independent reformist candidate. Although he was one of the original founders of the Iranian reformist camp, he shared many conservative principles. Many reformist parties, including Khatami's Islamic Iran Participation Front, supported his candidacy after Khatami withdrew from the race. However, other supporters of the reformist movement objected to Mousavi's candidacy, arguing that he was not committed to the principles of the reformist parties. Although Mousavi stated he was not running as a reformist, he indicated that he welcomed the support of various parties, both reformist and conservative.

He began his campaign at the center of Iranian politics but gradually shifted towards the reformist camp by declaring his support for reform. Although some active members of the conservative camp, such as Emad Afroogh, and the conservative newspaper Jomhouri Eslami, supported Mousavi's candidacy, he did not receive the official backing of any major conservative party. His candidacy made it more difficult for conservatives to support Ahmadinejad, and major conservative parties, such as the Combatant Clergy Association, did not endorse Ahmadinejad for a second term.

The BBC reported that Mousavi "called for greater personal freedoms in Iran and criticized the ban on private television channels", but "refused to back down from the country's disputed nuclear program", stating it was "for peaceful purposes".

On May 30, 2009, Mousavi pledged to amend "discriminatory and unjust regulations" against women and to take other measures in favour of women's rights and equality.

On May 23, 2009, the Iranian government blocked access to Facebook across the country but rescinded the blockage after public protests The Guardian reported that the blockage had been a response to the use of Facebook by candidates running against Ahmadinejad. Mousavi had strong support from those using social networking sites like Facebook; PC World reported that Mousavi's Facebook page had more than 6,600 supporters at the time.

On June 13, 2009, it was announced that Mousavi lost the election to Ahmadinejad. Accusations of fraud were widespread; the announcement of the results led to widespread protests, which were suppressed by the Iranian government.

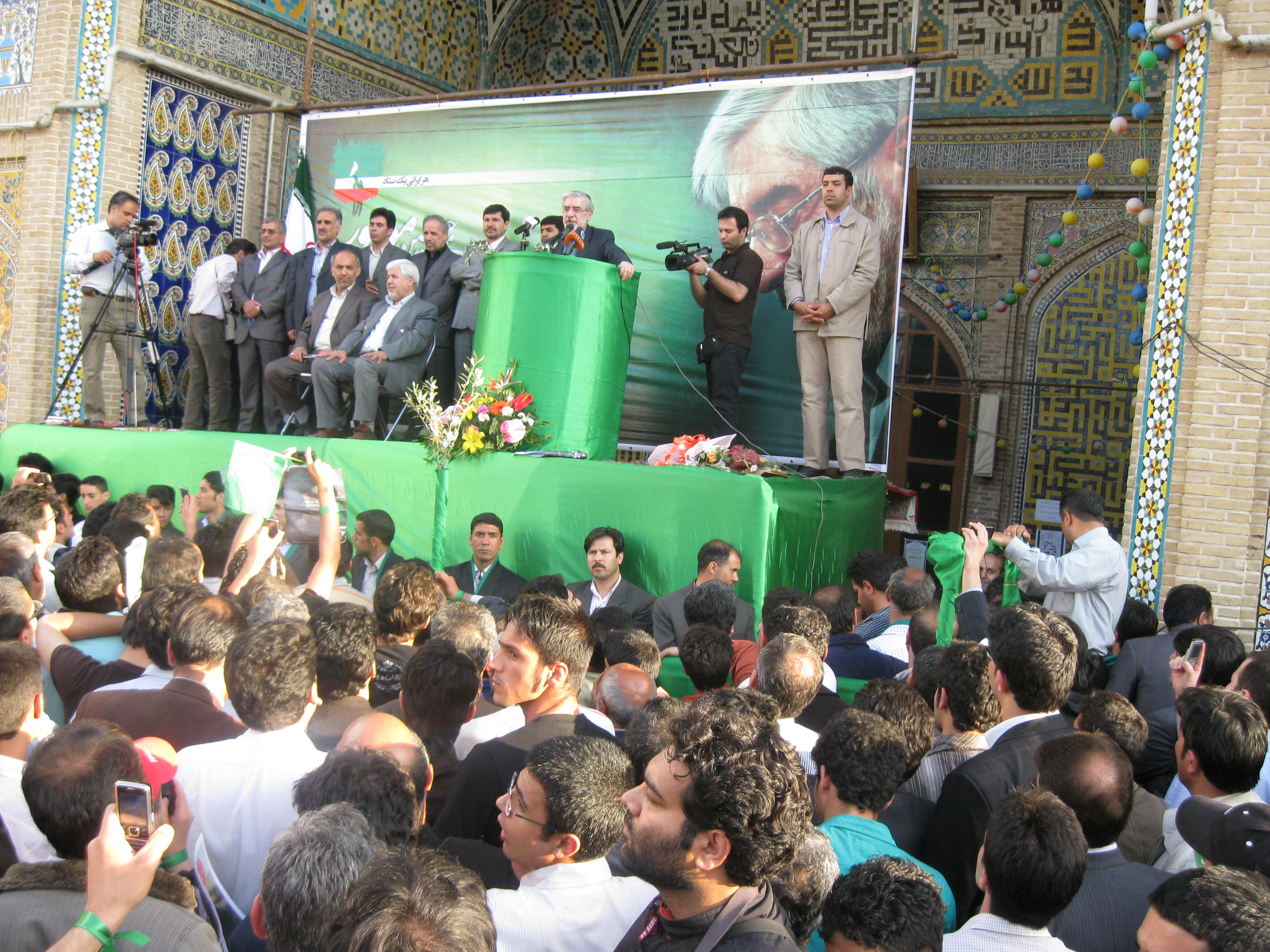
Mousavi addressing supporters during a presidential campaign stop in Zanjan

Mousavi delivering a speech in Zanjan in Azerbaijani

=== Endorsements ===
List of individuals and political parties who endorsed Mousavi in the 2009 presidential election
- Zahra Rahnavard, Spouse of Mousavi
- Mohammad Khatami, Former President of Iran
- Akbar Hashemi Rafsanjani, Chairman of Assembly of Experts
- Mohammad Reza Khatami, Former Deputy Speaker of Parliament
- Mohsen Sazegara, Writer and Former Deputy Prime Minister
- Hussein-Ali Montazeri, Grand Ayatollah and Former Deputy Supreme Leader
- Yousef Sane'i, Grand Ayatollah and Former Head of Guardian Council
- Masoumeh Ebtekar, Former Vice President
- Alireza Nourizadeh, Writer
- Hassan Khomeini, Grandchildren of Grand Ayatollah Ruhollah Khomeini
- Abdolkarim Soroush, Writer
- Ebrahim Nabavi, Writer
- Bahareh Rahnama, Actress
- Ali Daei, football coach
- Ali Karimi, Iranian professional footballer
- Shirin Ebadi, Iranian lawyer and human rights activist
- Mohammad-Reza Shajarian, Persian traditional singer
- Ezzatolah Entezami, Iranian actor
- Shohreh Aghdashloo, Iranian-American actress
- Masoud Kimiai, Iranian Movie Director
- Mohsen Makhmalbaf, Iranian Movie Director
- Hana Makhmalbaf, Iranian Movie Director
- Kiumars Pourahmad, Iranian Movie Director
- Manijeh Hekmat, Iranian Movie Director
- Dariush Mehrjui, Iranian Movie Director
- Fatemeh Motamed-Aria, Iranian actress
- Islamic Iran Participation Front
- Association of Combatant Clerics
- Executives of Construction Party
- Society of Forces Following the Line of the Imam
- Mojahedin of the Islamic Revolution of Iran Organization
- Islamic Labour Party
- Workers' House
- Nationalist-Religious Forces
- Invite and Correction of Iran
- Democracy Party
