= Saeidi =

Saeidi may refer to:

== People ==
=== Middle name ===
- Abbas Saeidi Tanha (born 1981), Iranian former cyclist

=== Surname ===
- Arash Saeidi (born 1975), French politician
- Fatemeh Saeidi, Iranian educator and reformist
- Meysam Saeidi, Iranian reformist politician
- Mohammad Esmaeil Saeidi (born 1961), Iranian retired Revolutionary Guards
- Mohammad Reza Saeidi (born 1987), Iranian athlete
- Saeidi brothers (born 1981), Iranian traditional singers
- Soroush Saeidi, Iranian football defender
