= Kayhan Barzegar =

Iranian political scientist

- کیهان برزگر
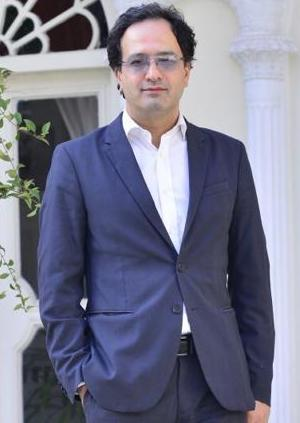
- Known for: Iranian foreign policy
- Scientific career
- Fields: International relations
- Workplaces: SRBIAU, LSE, Harvard Kennedy School
- Website: www.kayhanbarzegar.ir

Kayhan Barzegar (Persian: کیهان برزگر) is an Iranian professor of international relations, political strategist and researcher of International affairs. He is Dean of Faculty of Law and Political Sciences at the Islamic Azad University, Science and Research Branch, Tehran. Barzegar is known for his works on Iranian foreign policy.

== Career ==
Kayhan Barzegar is the director of the Center for Middle East Strategic Studies (CMESS) in Tehran. He is also a full Professor of International Relations at the Science and Research Branch of the Islamic Azad University and Dean of Faculty of Law and Political Sciences at this university. Barzegar was a research fellow at Harvard Kennedy School from 2007 to 2011, and a Post-doctorate research fellow at the London School of Economics (LSE) from 2002 to 2003. His works on Iran's foreign policy and strategic issues have been published widely, including in Foreign Affairs, the Washington Quarterly, Middle East Policy, Middle East Journal, World Policy Journal, The Brown Journal of World Affairs, and other academic journals both in English and in Persian. He is also a columnist writing for English opinion pages leading websites such as Al Monitor, Middle East Eye, Bulletin of the Atomic Scientists, Newsweek, Lobelog, Responsible Statecraft, The Christian Science Monitor, Valdai Club discussion, Al Jazeera Forum, Atlantic Council, etc. and Iranian leading scientific journal, newspapers and websites such as Iranian Review of Foreign Affairs, Strategic Studies Quarterly, Shargh daily, Etemad daily, Donya-e-Eghtesad, Tabnak, Khabaronline, Diplomat Magazine, etc. Barzegar participated in numerous international conferences such as in Med-Dialogues, Atlantic Dialogue, Beijing Forum, Al Shargh Forum, Valdai Club Discussion, Manama Dialogue, and made presentations on Iranian foreign and international affairs at many universities worldwide. His latest books are Iran’s Regional Policy in Time (CMESS Publications, 2019) and Iran’s Foreign Policy in the Middle East (Iran's Ministry of Foreign Affairs Publications, 2015).

== Books ==
- Iran’s Regional Policy in Time (CMESS Publications: Summer 2019).
- The Role of Morals in Boosting US Foreign Policy, translated by Kayhan Barzegar and Maryam Pashang, (Iran’s Foreign Ministry Publications: Spring 2020).
- Iran’s Nuclear Diplomacy, Edited by Kayhan Barzegar and Ali Esmaeli Ardakani, (Allameh Tabatabai University Publications: 2014).
- Iran’s Foreign Policy in the Middle East, (Iran’s Foreign Ministry Publications: Spring 2015).
- Islamic Republic of Iran, the Middle East, and Nuclear Negotiations, (CMESS Publications: Winter 2014).
- The Arab Developments, Iran, and the Middle East, (CMESS publications: Spring 2013).
- Iran’s Foreign Policy in the New Iraq, CSR Publications: Summer 2006).
- Iran, the New Iraq, and the Persian Gulf Political-Security Architecture, (CSR Publications: Spring 2008).
- Iran and the International System, (Law Enforcement Publications, Winter 2003).
