= Clericalism in Iran =

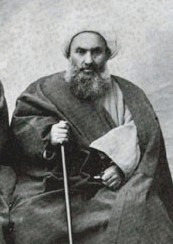
Sheikh Fazlollah Noori

Clericalism in Iran has a long history that has impacted on Iranian society and politics. Some scholars believe that clerical ideology began to take hold 1000 years ago.

== History ==
Over the course of history, Iranian seminaries have had traditional functions in the religious sphere to provide support to civil society in the country. However, after the Iranian revolution in 1979, seminaries have been highly politicized and their independence greatly reduced. The revolution created a new political order based on Shiite theological foundations and the absolute ruling power was given to a Shiite jurist/cleric.

The history of Qom seminaries dates back to 3rd century (Hijri). Hossein Ibn Said Ahvazi, a famous theologian, moved from Kufa to Qom. He educated the first generation of clerics in Qom.

== Schools ==
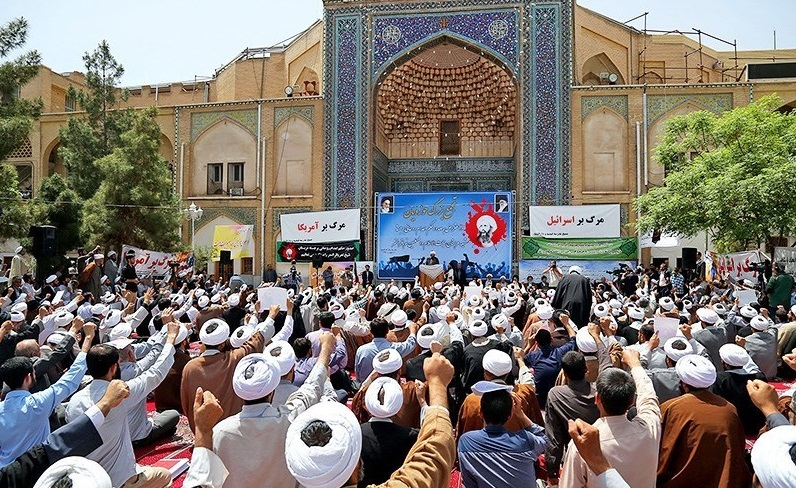
Qom Seminary

Shia:

- Najaf seminaries
- Qom seminaries
- Mashhad seminaries

Sunni:

- Zahedan seminaries

== Impact ==
Many clerics have been involved in economic activities, most notably Akbar Hashemi Rafsanjani, Abbas Vaez-Tabasi and Nasser Makarem Shirazi.

Clerics involved in politics during Safavid and Qajar era include Allameh Majlesi, Mirza Shirazi and Seyyed Jamaluddin Asadabadi (Afghan)

Clerics involved in the Iranian Constitutional Revolution

- Seyyed Mohammad Tabataba'i
- Seyyed Abdollah Behbehani
- Sheikh Mohammad Khiabani
- Mohammad Kazem Khorasani
- Sheikh Fazlollah Nouri (against the Constitutional Revolution)
- Mohammed Kazem Yazdi (against the Constitutional Revolution)

Clerics of the Pahlavi era

- Seyyed Hassan Modarres
- Seyyed Abolghasem Kashani
- Navvab Safavi
- Sheikh Mohammad Taghi Falsafi

Clerics involved in the Iranian Revolution

- Ruhollah Khomeini
- Hosseinali Montazeri
- Morteza Motahhari
- Mohammad Beheshti

Clerics acting as high officials

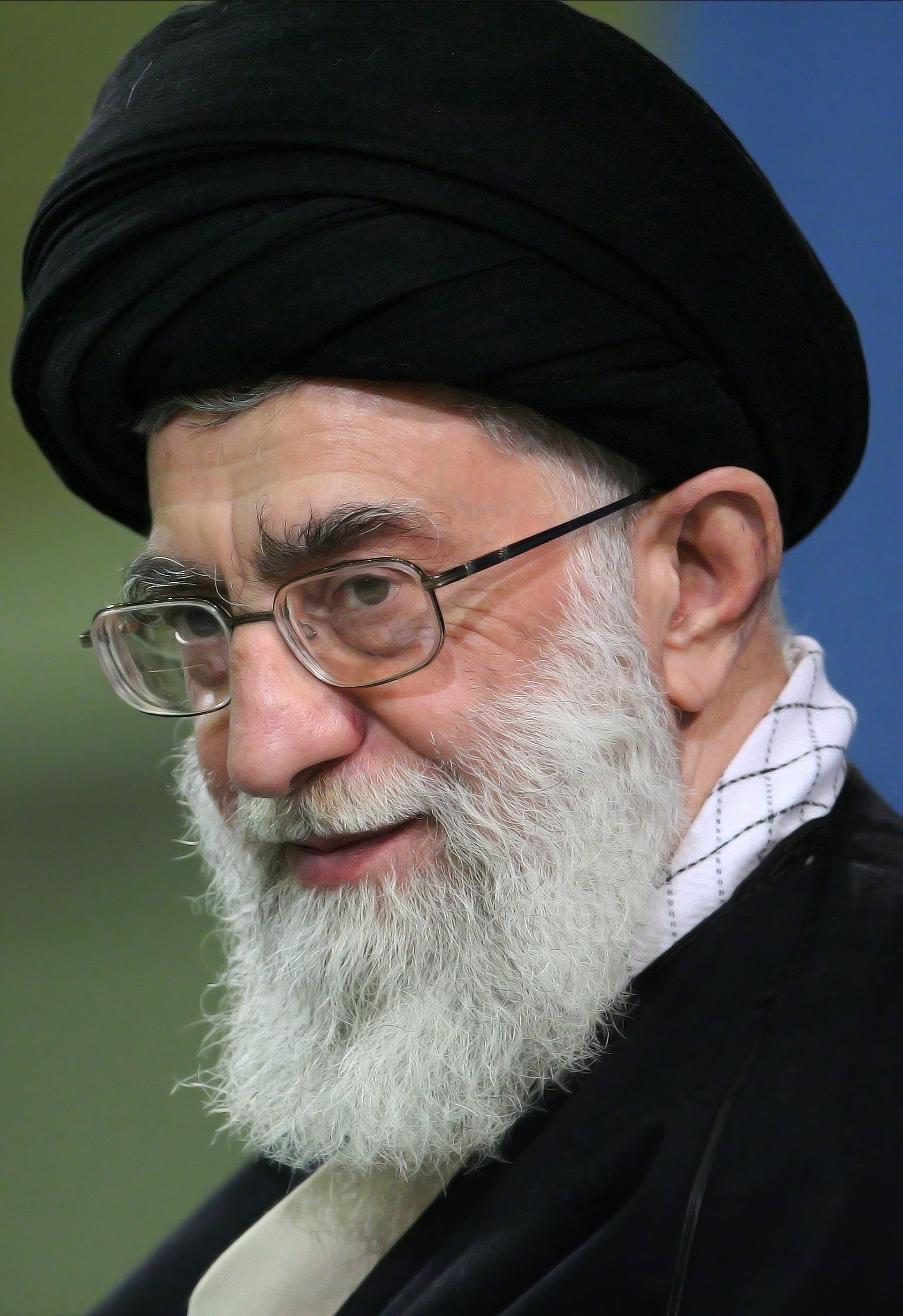
Seyyed Ali Khamenei, former Iranian supreme leader

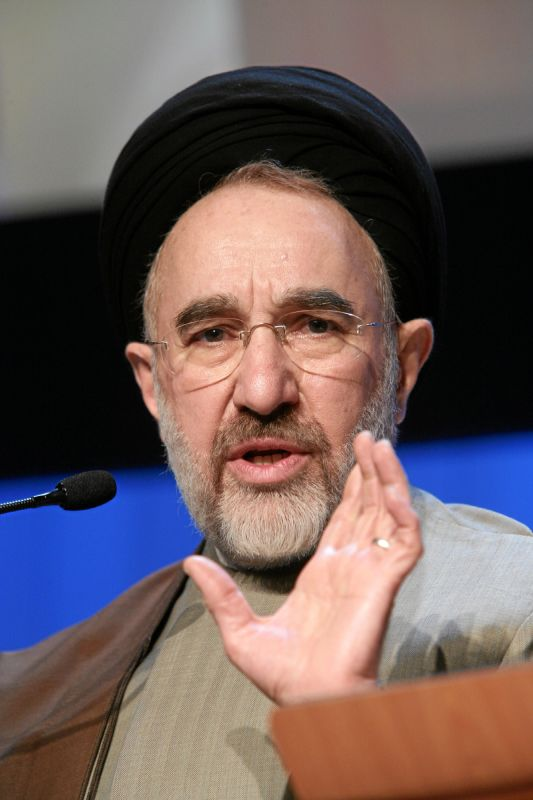
Mohammad Khatami, former Iranian president

- Ali Khamenei
- Akbar Hashemi Rafsanjani
- Mohammad Khatami
- Hassan Rouhani
- Mohammad Yazdi
- Ali Meshkini
- Mahmoud Hashemi Shahroudi
- Ahmad Jannati
- Mehdi Karroubi
- Ebrahim Raisi
- Ahmad Khatami
- Sadeq Larijani

Political parties founded by clerics

- Association of Combatant Clerics
- Combatant Clergy Association

== See also ==
- List of ayatollahs
- Islam in Iran
- Akhund
