= Mohajerani =

Mohajerani (Persian: مهاجرانی) is an Iranian surname. Notable people with the surname include:

- Ata'ollah Mohajerani (born 1954), Iranian historian, journalist, author, and reformist
- Heshmat Mohajerani (born 1936), Iranian football player and manager
