= National Trust Party =

National Trust Party may refer to:

- National Trust Party (Malaysia), a moderate Islamist political party in Malaysia
- National Trust Party (Iran), a political party in Iran, also translated as National Confidence Party
