= Barzegar =

Barzegar (Persian: برزگر) is a surname of Persian origin. Notable people with the surname include:

- Kayhan Barzegar (born 1968), Iranian political scientist
- Majid Barzegar (born 1973), Iranian film director, producer, screenwriter, and photographer
- Mansour Barzegar (born 1947), Iranian wrestler
- Mohammad Barzegar (born 1976), Iranian football player

== See also ==
- Mazraeh-ye Barzegar, a village in Iran
