= Mohammad Khoshchehreh =

Iranian economist and politician

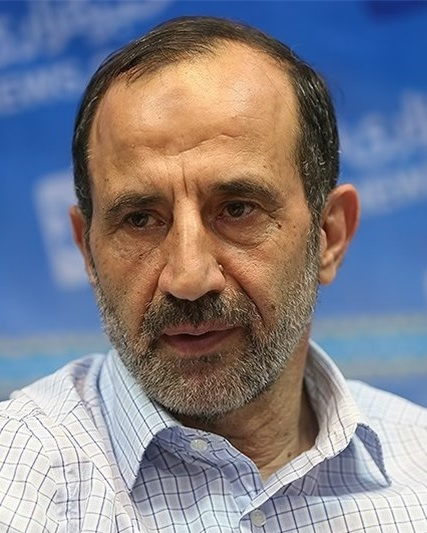

Member of Parliament of Iran
- In office 28 May 2004 – 28 May 2008
- Constituency: Tehran, Rey, Shemiranat and Eslamshahr
- Majority: 578,674 (29.35%)

Personal details
- Born: 1956 (age 69–70) Tehran, Iran
- Party: Alliance of Builders of Islamic Iran

Mohammad Khoshchehreh is an Iranian economist and politician.

== Political life ==
Khoshchehreh is a member of the Iranian parliament. A former advisor to Mahmoud Ahmadinejad, turned out to be one of his outspoken critics in the 7th parliament.

Mr. Khoshchehreh, an economist and urban planner, appeared frequently in public on behalf of Mr. Ahmadinejad, criticizing the economic performance of his main opponent, Akbar Hashemi Rafsanjani, a former president.

But within three months of Mr. Ahmadinejad's winning the election, Mr. Khoshchehreh had become one of his most outspoken critics. Less than three years later, with parliamentary elections coming up on Friday, many other former supporters have also become critics, and there is much anger over unemployment, inflation and fuel shortages in this oil-rich country.

With most reformists barred from running by a conservative vetting body, the election has come down to a contest between conservatives who still support the president and those who have become his opponents.

“Very soon I realized that I agreed with Mr. Ahmadinejad’s goals but not with his policies,” Mr. Khoshchehreh said recently. “My first criticism was that you cannot run the country with projects. You have to have plans and policies.”

“But Mr. Ahmadinejad has no plans at all,” he said, referring to economic and foreign policy. “He wants to run the country with charity projects, like giving out loans.”

Mr. Khoshchehreh, who is running for re-election to Parliament on Friday, entered politics for the first time in the elections four years ago. Mr. Ahmadinejad, who was Tehran's mayor at that time, made Mr. Khoshchehreh a senior adviser for two months before the election.

Mr. Khoshchehreh, 55, is one of a new generation of politicians in Iran who was not involved in the Islamic Revolution in 1979, nor in the 1980-1988 war with Iraq.

Between 1979 and 2004, he held administrative positions at the Ministry of Education and taught economics at state-run universities. He was in Britain from 1990 to 1993 working on his doctorate at the University of Strathclyde, where he was a member of the soccer team.

Unlike some of the somber clerics or Islamic conservatives, he smiles easily, wears short sleeves and holds a black belt in judo. On a bookshelf at his office at the School of Economics of Tehran University, he has dozens of books on economic theories, but also novels, like a Persian-language version of “One Hundred Years of Solitude” by Gabriel García Márquez.

But Mr. Khoshchehreh refers to the supreme religious leader of Iran, Ayatollah Ali Khamenei, who has the final word on all state matters, with the utmost respect. He calls himself a principlist, one of the religious conservatives who threw their support behind Mr. Ahmadinejad and who are now divided between his supporters and his critics.

He said that a principlist was a politician “who was loyal to his principles and did not sacrifice national interests for the sake of his party’s interests.”

Mr. Khoshchehreh was one of the critics of Mr. Ahmadinejad's budget in Parliament in February. The budget, he said, would allow the president to withdraw $65 billion from oil revenues, as opposed to the $15 billion called for in the country's four-year plan.

He said that influential supporters of the president in Parliament had forced through the budget, and he accused the critics of causing tension between Parliament and the government.

He has warned that Mr. Ahmadinejad's economic policies have led to inflation and have only made the poor poorer and the rich richer.

“People’s hope grows like a bubble when politicians give populist promises,” Mr. Khoshchehreh said. “But if these hopes are not materialized, the bubble bursts and the consequences are disastrous.”

Mr. Khoshchehreh began expressing his concerns about the president as early as October 2005, three months after Mr. Ahmadinejad took office. “The three principles of dignity, wisdom and expediency are mere slogans on the country’s foreign policy agenda,” the English-language newspaper Iran Daily quoted him as saying, criticizing the way the president was approaching foreign policy.

Last year, he said in an interview with the ISNA news agency that he worried that the perception among many Iranians that Mr. Ahmadinejad had failed as president would leave people disappointed with religion. He said this was because Mr. Ahmadinejad had said his government would be based on religious values.

“The failure of the government would make the system pay the price, and society will move toward secularism,” he warned.

In the recent interview, he expressed concern about Mr. Ahmadinejad's confrontational approach to foreign policy. “This approach might have results in the short term but it is not proper foreign policy,” he said.

Analysts view Mr. Khoshchehreh as part of the new class of politicians who have grown more moderate because of the need to deal with the realities of governing as members of Parliament.

“These people are faced with people’s increasing demands,” said Hamidreza Jalaipour, a sociologist and a former reformist politician. “Mr. Khoshchehreh is educated and he realizes that he has to be practical. He does not chant populist slogans.”

== See also ==
- Emad Afroogh
