= Ahmad Bourghani =

Member of Parliament of Iran
- In office May 26, 2000 – May 26, 2004
- Constituency: Tehran, Rey, Shemiranat and Eslamshahr
- Majority: 1,1393,65 (38.87%)

Personal details
- Born: January 2, 1960 Tehran, Iran
- Died: February 2, 2008 (aged 48) Tehran, Iran
- Party: Islamic Iran Participation Front
- Education: Ferdowsi University of Mashhad; Shahid Beheshti University

Ahmad Bourghani Farahani (Persian: احمد بورقانی فراهانی; January 2, 1960 – February 2, 2008) was an Iranian reformist politician, journalist, writer and political analyst.

Bourghani was deputy minister of culture of Iran in President Mohammad Khatami's cabinet. He was also head of IRNA in United Nations as well as member of Iranian parliament.

Bourghani received his bachelor's degree in geography from Shahid Beheshti University of Tehran. He entered journalism after the victory of the 1979 Islamic Revolution. During the Iran–Iraq War, he oversaw the War Information Press, and was chief news manager of the IRNA. From 1990 to 1993, he was posted in New York City as the UN correspondent for IRNA. Upon returning, he helped establish the short-lived weeklies Bahar, Barharan and Envoy.

During his brief tenure as vice-minister of Culture, Ahmad Bourghani oversaw the issuance of hundreds of press permits and the flowering of an independent Iranian press for the first time since 1979. He had a significant role in the development of journalism in post-revolution Iran. Following the initial attacks on the reformist press, Iran's conservatives tried to undercut the reformist press by reactivating the Press Court. Bourghani stood up in the Court in front of the young presiding judge, Saeed Mortazavi, and defended the freedom of the press. Mortazavi, the nephew of Ayatollah Yazdi, was trying to force Bourghani and Khatami's government to shut down the Jame'eh newspaper but when Bourghani refused to do so, he himself ordered to shut down the newspaper.

After the closure of Jame'eh and Tous in the summer of 1998, a second crop of independent dailies appeared in late 1998. These papers exposed Intelligence Ministry agents' involvement in the political assassinations of reformist intellectuals and activists in late 1998.

Bourghani, chosen by Khatami, to spearhead the liberalization of the public sphere, resigned in February 1999, frustrated with the intransigence of the Commission for the Supervision of the Press (a joint committee of representatives of the three branches of government and the press that reviews press application and thus determines who can and cannot publish), and dismayed by lukewarm support from his own minister, Ata'ollah Mohajerani, who narrowly survived a parliamentary impeachment motion in May for "cultural laxity".

Two years later, he was elected as representative of Tehran to Majlis of Iran, The Iranian Parliament. As a Member of Iranian Parliament, he persuaded his goal for the freedom of the press in Iran and was one of the key people in debating the Reform of the Press laws. Shortly after, Ayatollah Khamenei sent a letter to the parliament demanding that the debate stop.

Ahmad Bourghani was also the president of the Parliamentary Friendship Group between Italy and Iran. He was also the organizer of "Iran, hundred years after Iranian constitutional revolution", an international conference organized in Tehran (2007).

Bourghani died in a Tehran hospital of a heart attack at the age of 48.

== See also ==
- Islamic Iran Participation Front
- Politics of Iran
