= Abdolvahed Mousavi Lari =

Iranian cleric

Seyyed Abdolvahed Mousavi Lari
- عبدالواحد موسوی لاری
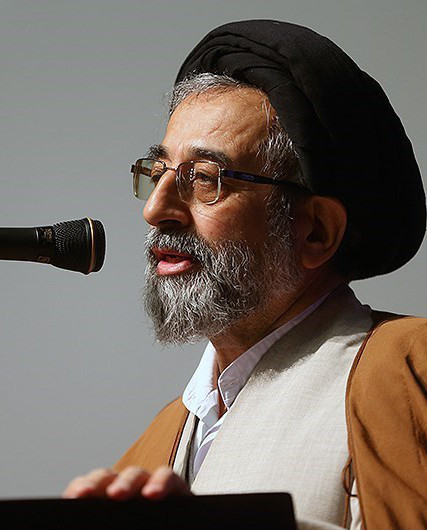
- Moosavi Lari in the 13th congress of Democracy Party.

Minister of Interior
- In office 22 July 1998 – 24 August 2005
- President: Mohammad Khatami
- Preceded by: Mostafa Tajzadeh (acting)
- Succeeded by: Mostafa Pourmohammadi

Vice President of Iran for Legal and Parliamentary Affairs
- In office 29 August 1997 – 22 July 1998
- President: Mohammad Khatami
- Preceded by: Ata'ollah Mohajerani
- Succeeded by: Mohammad-Ali Abtahi

Personal details
- Born: 1954 (age 71–72) Mohr, Iran
- Party: Association of Combatant Clerics

Abdolvahed Mousavi Lari Persian: عبدالواحد موسوی لاری (born 1954) is an Iranian Shia cleric and reformist politician. He was the interior minister during the presidency of Mohammad Khatami.

== Early life ==
Mousavi Lari was born in Mohr, Fars in 1954.

== Career ==
In August 1997, when Mohammad Khatami was elected president of Iran, Lari was appointed vice president for legal and parliamentary affairs. However, following the impeachment of Abdollah Nouri by the Parliament, he was nominated by Khatami as minister of interior and the Parliament voted to him. He was in office until 2005 when Mahmoud Ahmadinejad became president and nominated Mostafa Pour-Mohammadi as interior minister.

Lari is a leading member of the Association of Combatant Clerics party.

Political offices
Preceded by Abdollah Noori	Interior minister of Iran; 1998–2005	Succeeded by Mostafa Pour-Mohammadi
