= Islamic Azad University, Science and Research Branch, Tehran =

Iranian university

Coordinates: 35°47′27″N 51°18′45″E

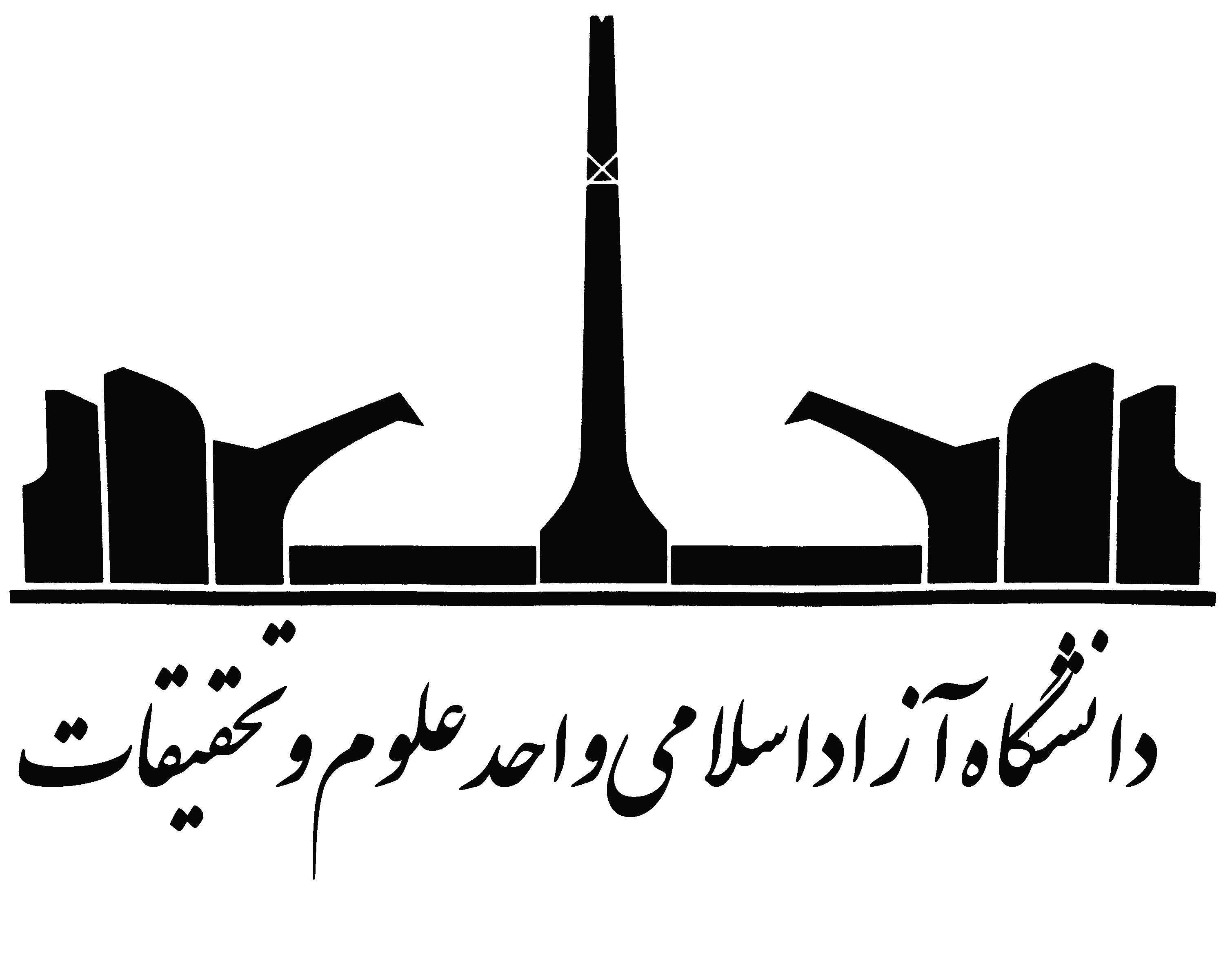
- Seal of the Islamic Azad University, Science and Research Branch, Tehran
- Type: Private research university
- Established: 1 November 1984; 41 years ago
- Parent institution: Islamic Azad University
- President: Bijan Ranjbar
- Rector: Jamshid Sabaghzadeh
- Academic staff: 1,800 [600 (Full-time) + 1,200 (Part-time, Visiting and Adjunct)] (Spring 2026)
- Administrative staff: 800 (Spring 2026)
- Students: 61,544 (Spring 2026)
- Undergraduates: 35,026 (Spring 2026)
- Postgraduates: 18,573 (Spring 2026)
- Doctoral students: 1,245 Professional Doctorate and 6,700 Ph.D. (Spring 2026)
- Location: Tehran, Tehran, Iran
- Campus: Urban Total 860 acres (350 ha) Core Campus 62 acres (25 ha)
- Colours: Dark and light blue
- Nicknames: S&R, SRBIAU, Science and Research University
- Website: srb.iau.ir

The Islamic Azad University, Science and Research Branch, Tehran is a private research university located in Tehran, Iran. Founded in 1984, the university is located next to the central organization of Islamic Azad University. Tehran Science and Research branch is ranked 647 in the world, 379 in research, 416 in innovation and 231 in social and many figures and university professors are graduates of this university campus.

== Campus ==
SRBIAU campus in Tehran is located in District 5(northwest of Tehran) on the steep slope of Tochal. Since October 2023, a gondola lift system provides the transportation for students and faculty. Prior to that, many buses did the task; on 25 December 2018, one of those buses overturned, killing 10 people.

=== Rector ===
Chancellor	Tenure	Alma mater	Speciality
Abdollah Jassbi	1984–2012	(United Kingdom) Aston University	Industrial Engineering and Management
Khosrow Daneshjoo	2012–2013	(Iran) SRBIAU	Architecture Engineering and Urban Development
Hamid Mirzadeh	2013–2014	(Australia) University of New South Wales	Polymer Engineering and Biomaterials
Ali Abbaspoor Tehrani Fard	2014–2017	(United States) UC Berkeley	Electrical Engineering and Nuclear Engineering
Farhad Rahbar	2017–2018	(Iran) University of Tehran	Theoretical Economics
Ghasem Amooabedini	2018–2018	(Germany) RWTH Aachen University	Biotechnology and Chemical Engineering
Reza Masoudi	2018–2021	(Canada) Laval University	Laser Physics and Photonics
Jamshid Sabaghzadeh	2021–present	(United States) Texas State University	Atomic and Molecular Physics

== Faculties ==
The university is made up of 16 faculties, all of them are subdivided into further 100 departments. (as of Spring 2026)

- Faculty of Engineering
- Faculty of Electrical and Computer Engineering
- Faculty of Chemical, Petroleum and Polymer Engineering
- Faculty of Civil Engineering
- Faculty of Converging Sciences and Technologies
- Faculty of Art, Architecture and Urbanism
- Faculty of Medical Sciences and Technologies
- Faculty of Agriculture, Natural Resources and Environment
- Faculty of Veterinary Sciences
- Faculty of Literature and Humanities
- Faculty of Law and Political Science
- Faculty of Management
- Faculty of Economics and Financial Sciences
- Faculty of International
- Faculty of Physical Education and Sport Sciences
- Faculty of Psychology and Education

=== Department of Aerospace and Mechanical engineering ===
Department of Mechanical and Aerospace Engineering, originally a part of the Faculty of Engineering and the main goal of this department is to educate and train students in mathematics, physics, mechanics and aerospace sciences to develop, strengthen and enhance abilities to analyze, model, build, measure, design and implement solutions throughout a broad spectrum of engineering fields. The faculty offers B.Sc., M.Sc. and PhD in both mechanical and aerospace engineering and has nearly 50 faculty members.

=== Department of Marine Science and Technologies ===
The department owns specialized laboratories at the Zakariya Razi and Sheykh Bahaee complexes at SRBIIAU. It is also pursuing the design and establishment of the International Institute for Research of Delvar, on the northern coast the Persian Gulf, to promote research and development on marine engineering and Sciences and to contribute to aquaculture. The institute is planned to enter into construction phase in early 2011.

=== Faculty of Literature and Humanities ===
The Faculty of Humanities and Social Sciences (FHSS) is one of the earliest entities of the SRBIAU having begun its activities at the time of its foundation under the title of Social Sciences Education encompassing four faculties covering social sciences, economics and management, law and political science, and divinity and philosophy. Following the formation and separation of three independent faculties — Economics and Management, Law and Political Sciences, and Divinity and Philosophy; this early structure evolved and transformed into the Faculty of Humanities and Social Sciences (FHSS) upon the approval of the SRBIAU management and endorsement of the president of the Islamic Azad University. Up to 2004 the faculty was under the auspices of the SRBIAU Education Deputy but since has been working as an independent entity. The departments at the FFLL include:

- Graduate level: French Language and Literature and French Language Translation
- Post graduate level: French language and literature, French language Translation, Persian Language and Literature, Arabic Language and Literature, English Language Teaching, English Language Translation, German language Teaching, Ancient Culture and Languages and Linguistics
- Doctorate level: French Language and Literature, Persian Language and Literature, Arab Language and Literature, English language Teaching, German language and Literature, Ancient Iranian Culture and Languages and Linguistics.

=== Faculty of Art, Architecture and Urbanism ===
The Faculty of Art and Architecture started working independently in 2004, with the aim of training professionals in architecture and urbanism fields. Currently it has 149 students in doctoral level, 383 graduate students, 10 full-time faculty members, 6 part-time and 8 visiting faculty members. The Faculty offers PhD in architecture and urban planning and post -graduate degree in architecture, urban designing, urban planning and regional planning.

=== Faculty of Agriculture, Natural Resources and Environment ===
The faculty began activities in 1990 in three major disciplines: Environmental Engineering, Environmental Management and Environmental Sciences, at post-graduate and PhD levels. Since the first semester of 2003-2004 the faculty is offering master's degree in Environmental Law and Environmental Economics, these being sub-disciplines of Environmental Management. Starting with the first semester of 2004–2005, Environment Design Engineering and Water Resources, being sub-disciplines of Environmental Engineering, have admitted students at the Masters level. From 2004 to 2005 the Energy Engineering has also been included in the faculty.

=== Department of Biomedical Engineering ===
The Science and Research Branch is the only branch of the Islamic Azad University which is active at all levels and in all disciplines pertaining to medical engineering. The department of Medical Engineering formally began its activities in 1998 with the admission of students at undergraduate and graduate levels (BS, MS and PhD) in bio-electric, bio-mechanics, and bio-materials. Since 2004 the department has been offering degrees in clinical disciplines.

=== Department of Food Sciences and Engineering ===
The Faculty of Food Sciences and Engineering (FFSE) was established and began to admit students in 1999. Up to now, the FFSE has trained some 5,100 graduates in a number of disciplines including Agricultural Engineering: Food Science and Technology, Chemical Engineering: Food, and Nutritional Sciences. The faculty with some 1818 square meter of built- space is constructed on four floors in an area of 994 square and enjoys facilities such as conference halls, computer sites, prayer houses, a dining hall for faculty staff and a buffet for students.

=== Faculty of Engineering ===
The Faculty of Engineering (Persian: دانشکده فنی و مهندسي) has 6500 square meters of built space and a five-story building. Adjacent to the faculty is the Laboratories Building, with 2700 square meters on two floors. Educational and research activities are offered at doctorates, post-graduate and graduate levels. The FE has 1574 undergraduate students, 1176 graduate students and 377 doctoral students. Current courses offered at the FE include 30 disciplines in 11 sub-disciplines at graduate level, 11 disciplines in 35 sub-disciplines at post- graduate level and 11 disciplines in 30 sub-disciplines at doctorate level. There are 141 faculty members. In addition, some 200 visiting professors per semester, in coordination with the deans of faculty departments, help the students in their education and research. Currently the number of students at all levels are 3135, and so far about 2817 students have graduated from this department.

=== Faculty of Management ===
Currently the faculty has some 3000 students studying at graduate to doctorate levels. The faculty with 1500 square meter of built space is located in the main campus of the SRBIAU.

=== Department of Divinity and Philosophy ===
The Faculty of Divinity and Philosophy (FDP) started its work in 1982 as a new academic center of SRBIAU; however, although some of the courses offered by the faculty goes back to the time when SRBIAU was established. The FDP includes 14 departments at post-graduate and doctorate levels. From the time of its establishment FDP has had many graduates at who currently serve in universities and research centers in the country.

=== Faculty of Chemical, Petroleum and Polymer Engineering ===
Established in 2006, the Faculty is offering BSc, MSc and PhD degrees in a number of Chemical, oil and gas related fields while being equally active in advanced research and technology.

== Research centers ==
- Center for Environment and Energy Research and Studies (CEERS)
- Plasma Physics Research Center (Plasma Physics Research Center)
- Center for Strategic Studies
- Nano Research Laboratory Tehran (Ultrasonic Research Lab) - Official website (in Persian)

== Notable alumni and people ==
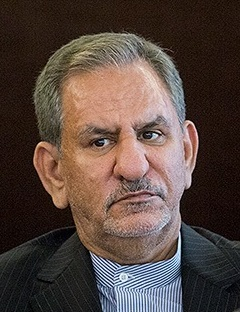
Eshagh Jahangiri, PhD (Industrial Management)

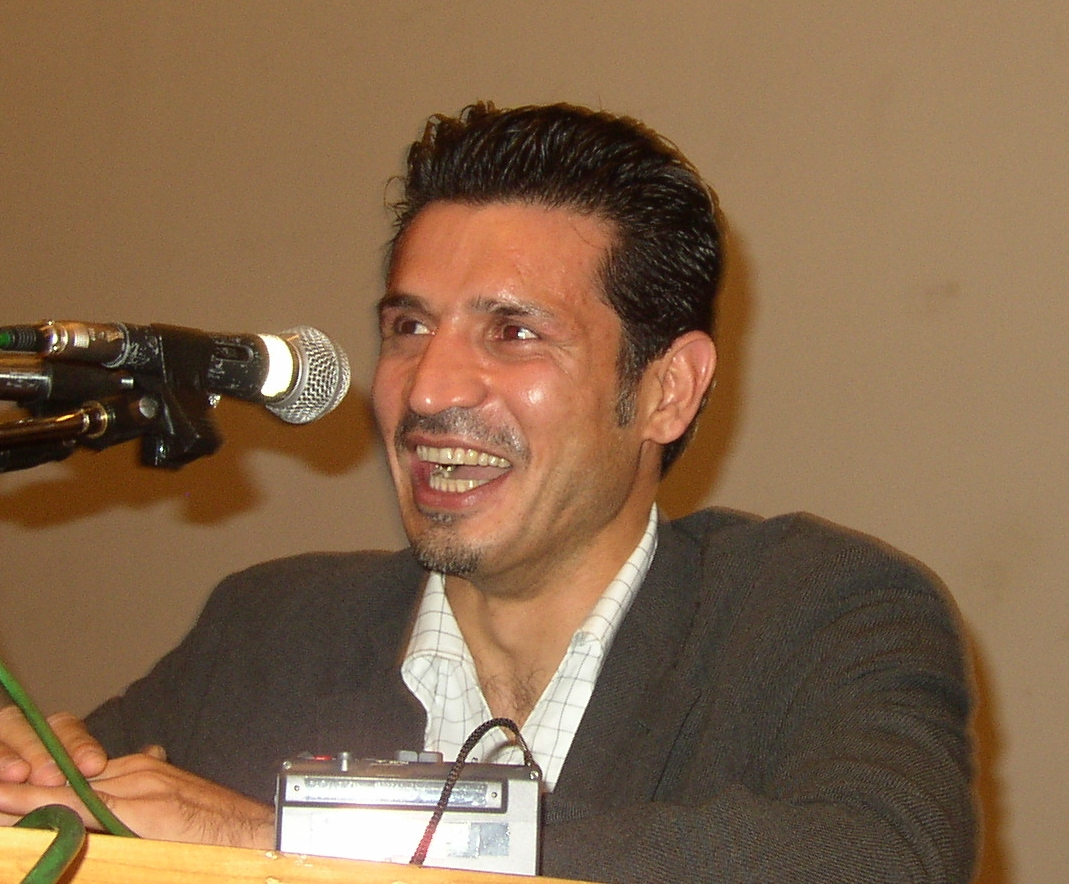
Ali Daei, PhD (Sociology of Sport)

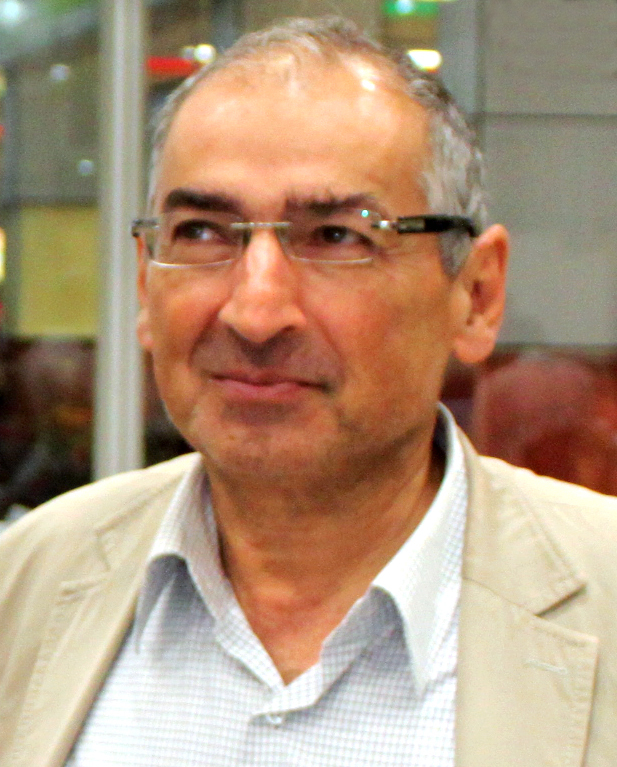
Sadegh Zibakalam, Faculty of Political Sciences

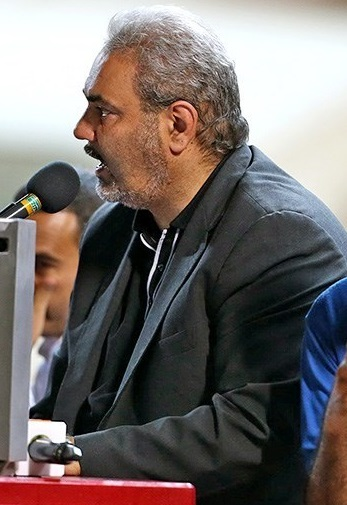
Javad Khiabani, PhD (Sociology of Sport)

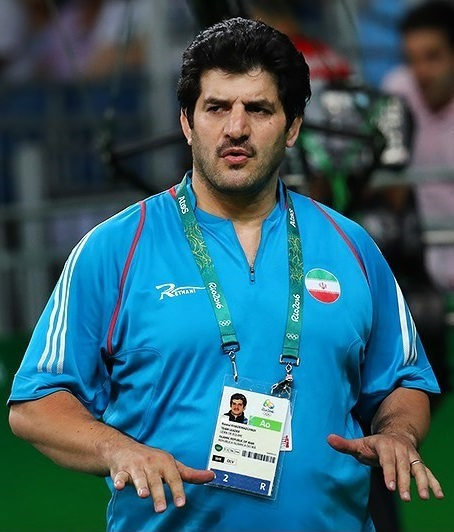
Rasoul Khadem, PhD (Sociology)

== Gallery ==
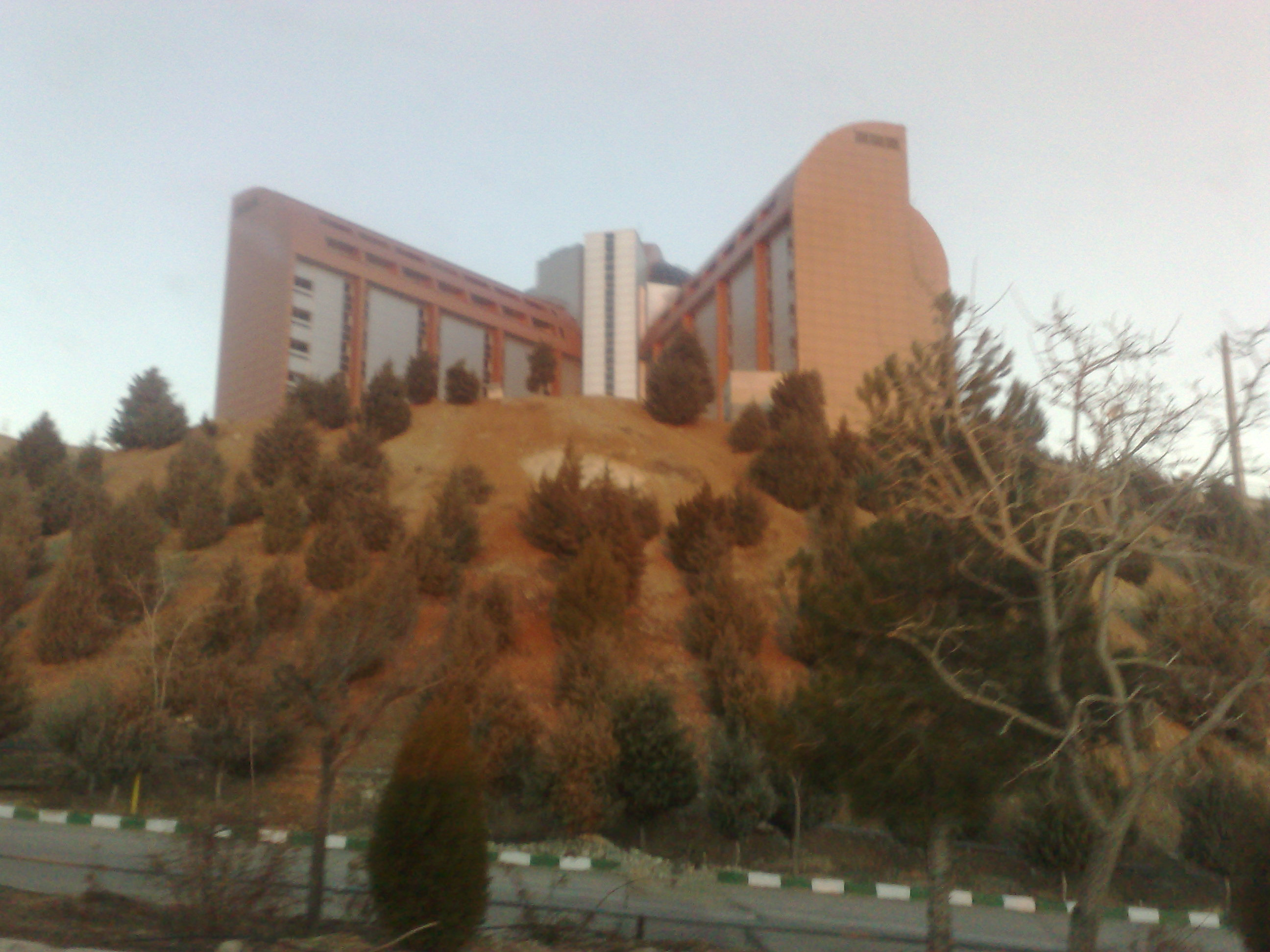

== See also ==
- Higher Education in Iran
- List of universities in Iran
- Islamic Azad University
- Islamic Azad University Central Tehran Branch
- Islamic Azad University South Tehran Branch
- Islamic Azad University North Tehran Branch
- Islamic Azad University West Tehran Branch
