= Etemad =

Iranian reformist newspaper

- Type: Daily newspaper
- Format: Broadsheet
- Owner: Elias Hazrati
- Editor: Elias Hazrati
- Founded: 2002; 24 years ago
- Political alignment: Reformism (Iranian)
- Language: Persian
- Headquarters: Tehran, Iran
- Circulation: 25,000 Daily (2015)
- Website: www.etemadnewspaper.ir/fa/main/page

Etemad or Etemaad (Persian: اعتماد, lit. 'Trust') is a Persian-language reformist newspaper based in Iran that is published in Tehran. It is managed by Elias Hazrati, who was representative from Rasht and Tehran in the Parliament of Iran.

== Overview ==
The first edition of Etemad was published in Tehran in 2002. Its chief editor is Behrooz Behzadi. The editorial board of Etemad include journalists, who worked previously in reformist Iranian magazines and newspapers, which were banned by the Iranian judiciary.

The paper focuses on political, cultural, social and economic news.

== Temporary ban ==
Etemad had published more than 2000 editions before temporarily banned by the Iranian judiciary system on 1 March 2010. it published a story on the reaction to the emergence of a film showing the police attack on Tehran university in June, just three days after the Iranian presidential election, 2009.

Etemaaad, which often criticized Mahmoud Ahmadinejad's administration, was loosely affiliated with the reformists. It had a high circulation and was widely seen as the most influential, semi-independent news source still allowed to publish.

Etemad, which was in its eighth year with a relatively high circulation of more than 100,000, was one of the most influential publications in Iran, especially among intellectuals. Behrooz Behzadi, editor-in-chief of the paper, told The Guardian: "The Press Supervisory Board shut down our paper without giving us even a specific reason. It's an absolutely arbitrary decision."

== New period ==
Elias Hazrati, the manager of Etemad, said on 27 October 2010, that this newspaper was allowed to publish. The new period begins after nine months. The opposition publication is linked to former Parliament speaker Mehdi Karroubi, an outspoken opposition leader who challenged the government of Mahmoud Ahmadinejad. Hazrati is one of the members of the National Trust Party, which was established in 2005 by Karroubi.

== See also ==
- List of newspapers in Iran
