= Coalition of Iran's Independent Volunteers =

Coalition of Iran's Independent Volunteers ائتلاف خدمتگزاران مستقل ایران
- Secretary-General: Amir-Ali Amiri
- Spokesperson: Emad Afroogh
- Religion: Shia Islam
- National affiliation: Principlists

The Coalition of Iran's Independent Volunteers (Persian: ائتلاف خدمتگزاران مستقل ایران) is a principlist political group in Iran. Emad Afroogh is Spokesperson of the group. The group was established before 2004 Iranian legislative election.
