= Ali Akbar Mohtashamipour =

Iranian cleric and politician (1947–2021)

Seyyed Ali Akbar Mohtashamipour
- علی‌اکبر محتشمی‌پور
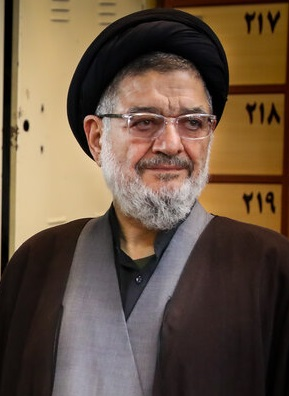

Minister of the Interior
- In office 28 October 1985 – 29 August 1989
- President: Ali Khamenei
- Prime Minister: Mir-Hossein Mousavi
- Preceded by: Ali Akbar Nategh-Nouri
- Succeeded by: Abdollah Nouri

Member of the Islamic Consultative Assembly
- In office 28 May 2000 – 28 May 2004
- Constituency: Tehran, Rey, Shemiranat and Eslamshahr
- Majority: 717,076 (24.46%)
- In office 18 February 1989 – 28 May 1992
- Constituency: Tehran, Rey, Shemiranat and Eslamshahr
- Majority: 225,767 (34.1%)

Ambassador of Iran to Syria
- In office 1982–1986
- President: Ali Khamenei
- Prime Minister: Mir-Hossein Mousavi
- Preceded by: Ali Motazed
- Succeeded by: Mohammad Hassan Akhtari

Personal details
- Born: 30 August 1947 Tehran, Imperial State of Iran
- Died: 7 June 2021 (aged 73) Tehran, Iran
- Party: Association of Combatant Clerics
- Relatives: Fakhri Mohtashamipour (niece)
- Education: Alavi Institute; Qom Seminary; Hawza Najaf

Ali Akbar Mohtashamipour (Persian: سید علی‌اکبر محتشمی‌پور; 30 August 1947 – 7 June 2021), also known as Mohtashami, was an Iranian Shia cleric and former interior minister of the Islamic Republic of Iran. He was active in the Iranian Revolution and is seen as a founder of the Hezbollah movement in Lebanon as well as one of the "radical elements advocating the export of the revolution," in the Iranian clerical hierarchy.

In an Israeli assassination attempt targeting Mohtashami, he lost his right hand when he opened a book loaded with explosives. He died on 7 June 2021 from COVID-19 during the COVID-19 pandemic in Iran.

== Biography ==
Mohtashemi studied in the holy city of Najaf Iraq, where he spent considerable time with his mentor Ayatollah Khomeini. During the 1970s he received military training in a Fatah camp in Lebanon and lived in a remote village, Yammoune, in the Beqaa valley. He also accompanied Khomeini during his period in exile in both Iraq and France. He co-founded an armed group in the 1970s with Mohammad Montazeri, son of Ayatollah Hossein Ali Montazeri, in Lebanon and Syria, aiming at assisting liberation movements in Muslim countries.

Following the Iranian revolution he served as Iran's ambassador to Syria from 1982 to 1986. He later became Iran's minister of interior. While ambassador to Syria, he is thought to have played a "pivotal role" in the creation of the Lebanese radical Shia organization Hezbollah, working "within the framework of the Department for Islamic Liberation Movements run by the Iranian Pasdaran." Mohtashami "actively supervised" Hezbollah's creation, merging into it existing radical Shi'ite movements; the Lebanese al-Dawa; Islamic Amal; Islamic Jihad Organization; Imam Hussein Suicide Squad, Jundallah and the Association of Muslim Students. In 1986 his "close supervision" of Hezbollah was cut short when the Office of Islamic Liberation was reassigned to Iran's ministry of foreign affairs. He is also described as having made "liberal" use of the diplomatic pouch as Ambassador, bringing in "crates" of material from Iran. He remained among radical hard line parties even when he was chosen as the minister of the interior in the government of Khomeni.

In 1989 the new Iranian president Akbar Hashemi Rafsanjani ousted Mohtashami from the Lebanon desk of the Iranian ministry of foreign affairs and replaced him with his brother Mahmud Hashemi. This was seen as an indication of Iran's downgrading of its support for Hezbollah and for a revolutionary foreign policy in general.

In August 1991 he regained some of his influence when he became chairman of the defense committee of the Majlis (parliament) of Iran.

More controversially, Mohtashami is thought to have played an active role, with the Pasdaran and Syrian military intelligence, in the supervision of Hezbollah's suicide bomb attacks against the American embassy in Beirut in April 1983, the American and French contingents of the MNF in October 1983 and the American embassy annex in September 1984, and to have been instrumental in the killing of Lt. Col. William R. Higgins, the American Chief of the United Nations Truce Supervision Organization's (UNTSO) observer group in Lebanon who was taken hostage on 17 February 1988 by Lebanese pro-Iranian Shia radicals. The killing of Higgins is said to have come "from orders issued by Iranian radicals, most notably Mohtashemi," in an effort to prevent "improvement in the U.S.–Iranian relationship." It also came from alleged involvement in the December 1988 bombing of Pan AM Flight 103. The US Defense Intelligence Agency alleges that Ali Akbar Mohtashamipour (Ayatollah Mohtashemi), a member of the Iranian government, paid US$10 million for the bombing:

Ayatollah Mohtashemi: (...) and was the one who paid the same amount to bomb Pan Am Flight 103 in retaliation for the US shoot-down of the Iranian Airbus.

While Mohtashami was a strong opponent of Western influence in the Muslim world and of the existence of the state of Israel, he was also a supporter and advisor of reformist Iranian president Mohammad Khatami who is famous for having championed free expression and civil rights. Mohtashemi was in the Western news again in 2000, not as a hardline radical but for refusing to appear in court in Iran after his pro-reform newspaper, Bayan, was banned.

Behzad Nabavi and Ali Akbar Mohtashami were among those who were prevented by the Guardian council from taking part in the elections of Majlis.

In 2001, he created the IUPFP that was directed as of 2008 by the Lebanese-Belgian Hezbollah-activist Dyab Abou Jahjah, who succeeded to organise à conference in the Belgian Parliament and infiltrated the British Parliament with the help of Jeremy Corbyn a few months later.

=== Attempted assassination ===
In 1984, after the Beirut bombings, Mohtashami received a parcel containing a book on Shia holy places when he was serving as Iranian ambassador to Damascus. As he opened the package it detonated, blowing off his hand and severely wounding him. Mohtashami was medevaced to Europe and survived the blast to continue his work. The identity of the perpetrators of the attack was long unknown, but in 2018 Ronen Bergman, in his book Rise and Kill First, revealed that the Israelis were behind the assassination attempt. The Israeli Prime Minister, Yitzhak Shamir personally signed the assassination order, after being given them by Mossad director Nahum Admoni.

=== Death ===
He died on 7 June 2021, aged 73, at Khatam ol-Anbia Hospital in Tehran of complications related to COVID-19.

Political offices
Preceded by Ali Akbar Nategh Nori	Interior minister of Iran; 1985–1989	Succeeded by Abdollah Nouri
Assembly seats
Preceded by Majid Ansari as Head of "Hezbollah Assembly"	Parliamentary leader of reformists 2000–2004	Succeeded by Hossein Hashemian as Head of "Imam's line fraction"
Party political offices
Vacant	Campaign manager of Mehdi Karroubi; 2005	Succeeded by Gholamhossein Karbaschi
