= Mehdi Karroubi =

Iranian Shia cleric and reformist politician

- مهدی کروبی
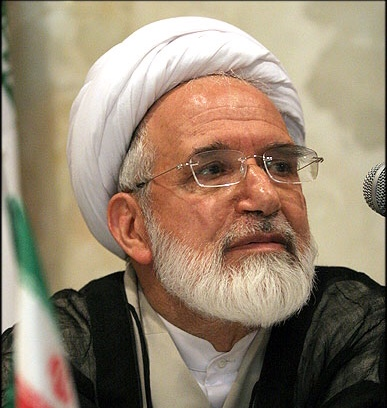
- Karroubi in 2005

Member of Expediency Discernment Council
- In office 30 May 2004 – 19 June 2005
- Appointed by: Ali Khamenei
- Chairman: Akbar Hashemi Rafsanjani
- Preceded by: Gholam-Ali Haddad-Adel

2nd Speaker of the Islamic Consultative Assembly
- In office 28 May 2000 – 27 May 2004
- Deputy: Behzad Nabavi; Mohammad-Reza Khatami
- Preceded by: Ali Akbar Nategh Nouri
- Succeeded by: Gholam-Ali Haddad-Adel
- In office 3 August 1989 – 3 May 1992
- Deputy: Hossein Hashemian
- Preceded by: Ali Akbar Hashemi Rafsanjani
- Succeeded by: Ali Akbar Nategh-Nouri

First Deputy of the Parliament of Iran
- In office 28 June 1988 – 3 August 1989
- Preceded by: Mohammad Yazdi
- Succeeded by: Hossein Hashemian
- In office 15 June 1986 – 14 June 1987
- Preceded by: Mohammad Yazdi
- Succeeded by: Mohammad Yazdi

Member of Parliament of Iran
- In office 28 May 2000 – 28 May 2004
- Constituency: Tehran, Rey, Shemiranat and Eslamshahr
- Majority: 892,640 (30.45%)
- In office 28 May 1984 – 28 May 1992
- Constituency: Tehran, Rey, Shemiranat and Eslamshahr
- Majority: 965,484 (61.4%; 3rd term), 1,443,270 (62.5%; 2nd term)
- In office 28 May 1980 – 28 May 1984
- Succeeded by: Mohammad-Reza Hashemi
- Constituency: Aligudarz County
- Majority: 49,097 (92.9%)

Personal details
- Born: 26 September 1937 (age 89) Aligudarz, Lorestan Province, Imperial State of Iran
- Party: The Green Path of Hope (2009–present); National Trust Party (2005–present); Association of Combatant Clerics (1988–2005); Islamic Republican Party (1979–1987); Combatant Clergy Association (1978–1988)
- Spouse: Fatemeh Karroubi (m. 1962)
- Children: 4
- Education: University of Tehran
- Website: Official website

Mehdi Karroubi (Persian: مهدی کروبی, romanized: Mehdi Karrubi, born 26 September 1937) is an Iranian Shia cleric and reformist politician leading the National Trust Party. Following 2009–2010 Iranian election protests, Karroubi was put under house arrest in February 2011. According to state media, Karroubi was due to be released from house arrest in March 2025, 14 years after he was detained for calling for a rally in support of the Arab Spring protests.

He was the speaker of the parliament from 1989 to 1992 and 2000 to 2004, and a presidential candidate in the 2005 and 2009 presidential elections.

He has been described as a "moderate" with a "mostly rural" base of support. Karroubi considers himself a pragmatic reformist and now is one of the leaders of the Iranian Green Movement.

He is a founding member and former secretary-general of the Association of Combatant Clerics party. Karroubi is a critic of the Guardian Council and Iran's Judicial System. By appointment of the Supreme Leader, he was a member of the Expediency Discernment Council and an adviser, posts he held until resigning from all his posts on 15 June 2005 after the first round of the 2005 presidential election.

== Early life, education, and career ==
Mehdi Karroubi is born on 26 September 1937 into a Shia clerical family in Aligudarz, a city in the western part of Lorestan province. He is of Lur origin, and has a brother named Hassan.

Karroubi studied theology and Islamic studies at seminaries in Qom and Tehran. He studied under notable figures such as Hossein-Ali Montazeri and Ruhollah Khomeini. Karroubi was promoted to Mujtahid on the recommendation of the Grand Ayatollah Yousef Sanei and others. He also studied theology and law at Tehran University. In 1962, he became a lawyer in economy, dealing with the investments of prominent businessmen in Iran.

Karroubi was imprisoned several times by the government of the Shah of Iran, Mohammad Reza Pahlavi, during the 1970s, including a stint at the Qasr Prison in Tehran. His wife, Fatemeh, later recalled that she took their second son, Taghi, to meet his father at Qasr Prison for the first time when he was six months old.

In 1978, Karroubi retired from law in order to commit to politics. In 1979, he joined the Iranian Revolution. Karroubi was the head of the Imam Khomeini Relief Committee. From 1980 to 1992 he was also the director of the Martyr's Foundation, and from 1989 to 1992 he was a Parliament Speaker.

In 1988, Karroubi re-entered business after 10 years of emphasis on politics. With eighteen years of experience as a solicitor beforehand, Karroubi began trading and investing himself.

== Political positions and views ==
=== Domestic policies ===
During his first term as speaker of Parliament, Karroubi was among the maktabi or "radical" faction of the majlis who contested the policies of President Akbar Hashemi Rafsanjani. While Rafsanjani favored foreign investment and market reforms, Karroubi and others "sought to promote mass political participation and maintain state control of the economy". In fall of 1989 several radical clerics founded the Association of Combatant Clerics of Tehran, which Karroubi headed. Karroubi eventually left this association in 2005 and founded his own party, Etemad-e-Melli.

His wife, Fatemeh, served as his social affairs advisors when he served as the chairman of the Majlis of Iran from 2000 until 2004.

Mehdi Karroubi, an ethnic Lur, supports an approach where all people regardless of their gender, religion, or ethnicity can feel that they are part of Iranian government. He was outspoken in supporting the rights of religious and ethnic minorities. He visited churches, synagogues and Zoroastrian temples during his time as speaker of Parliament.

Karroubi is a critic of the Guardian Council and on numerous occasions wrote letters to the council expressing his concerns. He criticized the nature of the Guardian Council's supervision over the elections.

=== Foreign policies ===
Karroubi and the National Trust Party support the idea of dialogue with the United States aiming at resolving long standing conflicts. Early after the election of Barack Obama as US president, Karroubi stated that the changes from the United States have been positive.

Karroubi has been a critic of President Ahmadinejad's foreign policy and his infamous remarks about the Holocaust. Karroubi said: "The Holocaust is an event which did take place." He believes that the president's remarks cost Iran a great deal. However, he once stated that "Hitler's massacre of innocent Jews in Germany was a conspiracy of the Zionists." He alleged that the founder of Israel collaborated with the Nazis by handing over 40,000 Jews to further the Zionist cause.

== Presidential campaigns ==
=== 2005 presidential campaign ===
Karroubi was among the reformist candidates in the presidential election of 2005, where he finished third in the vote count, closely following the front runners, ex-president Akbar Hashemi Rafsanjani and Tehran mayor Mahmoud Ahmadinejad. As neither gathered a majority of the vote, a run-off election was held on 24 June 2005, and won by Ahmadinejad.

After the announcement of the election results, Karroubi alleged that a network of mosques, the Islamic Revolutionary Guard Corps, and Basij militia forces had been illegally used to generate and mobilize support for Ahmadinejad. He then explicitly alleged that Mojtaba Khamenei, a son of the Supreme Leader Ayatollah Khamenei, was among the conspirators. Ayatollah Khamenei wrote to Karroubi, characterizing these allegations as "below his dignity" and warning that they would "result in a crisis" in Iran, which he would not allow. Karroubi responded in an open letter, resigning from all his political posts, including that as adviser to the Supreme Leader and as a member of Expediency Discernment Council, both of which he had been appointed to by Khamenei. The day after, on 20 June, distribution of the reformist morning newspapers Eqbal, Hayat-e No, Aftab-e Yazd, and Etemad were stopped by the prosecutor-general of Tehran, Saeed Mortazavi, for publishing Karroubi's letter, with Eqbal being completely banned from publication. It was claimed that Karroubi was subject to house arrest because of his letter.

Akbar Hashemi Rafsanjani, who ranked first in the first round, also pointed to organized and unjust interventions, alleged manipulation of the vote, and supported Karroubi's complaint.

=== 2009 presidential election ===
Immediately after the 2005 presidential election Karroubi founded Etemad-e Melli Party, and along with it Etemad-e Melli newspaper. In the 2009 election, he ran as the head of his party. However, many non-party figures also endorsed him.

Karroubi was described as "the best-organized" among the main candidates. He has his own party, his own newspaper and has always followed a clear political stance.

He claimed to be the first candidate to announce his candidacy for the presidency. During the last months before the election, he refused a call for him to withdraw in the support of Mohammad Khatami or later Mir-Hossein Mousavi. Later, both Mousavi and Karroubi stated that a union among reformists would only help Ahamadinejad's reelection, claiming that reformists needed a massive turn out in order to win and that more candidates would advance their interests.

Karroubi publicized his policies by publishing four electoral declarations. According to a paper handed to his supporters during the campaign his main policies are:

1. Returning to the planned-based system of governing and using the elite and experts in decision making process
2. Organizing financial policies and increasing the effect of national budget
3. Protecting human rights and people's privacy
4. Improving women's social status
5. Nationalizing oil profits
6. Supporting NGOs
7. Supporting the right of religious or tribal minorities
8. Supporting the domination of law and opposing and criticizing illegal behavior
9. Supporting the press and free access to the information and internet

In a 2009 interview with the AFP, Karroubi also promised to expand women's rights if elected president of Iran. Among the reforms which he planned to introduce were elimination of Iran's morality police street patrols, which force an Islamic dress code on Iranian women. He questioned mandatory Islamic dress code and proposed that Hijab needs to be optional.

His foremost economic program is for broad public ownership of the national oil and gas companies. According to this plan, adopted from the pro-market economist Massoud Nilli, company stock and profits would be shared among Iranians above 18 years of age, without the right to sell. He has predicted that this will add 70000 Tomans a month to every Iranian's income.

His campaign slogan was "Change for Iran", a word visible on his banners and other advertisements.

Former Tehran mayor Gholamhossein Karbaschi was among the first to endorse him, and was Karroubi's campaign manager. Karroubi has promised to appoint him vice president if elected.

Karroubi also gained endorsements from journalist Abbas Abdi, now his political advisor, and Jamileh Kadivar, former member of the parliament and his advisor on women's issues. Other notable supporters include: Ata'ollah Mohajerani, historian, politician, journalist, and author and former culture minister during Khatami's presidency; Mohammad-Ali Abtahi, President Khatami's chief of staff, then his vice president for Legal and Parliamentary Affairs, and finally his advisor; Mohammad-Ali Najafi, Iranian politician and university professor and former minister of education; Emadeddin Baghi, the founder and head of the Committee for the Defense of Prisoners' Rights and the Society of Right to Life Guardians, and winner of the Martin Ennals Award for Human Rights Defenders; Abdolkarim Soroush, philosopher and professor.

Mehdi Karroubi widely campaigned with his wife, Fatemeh Karroubi, during the campaign, which had previously been an unusual for a politician and his wife in Iran. Fatemeh Karroubi additionally served as the head of her husband's campaign in Tehran province and made separate speeches in support of her husband's candidacy. Karroubi's son, Taghi Karroubi, worked as one of his campaign managers.

== Post-election activity ==
On 9 August 2009, in a letter to the Chairman of the Expediency Discernment Council of Iran, Karroubi demanded investigation of Iranian prisons for possible tortures and in particular sexual harassment of men and women. On 19 August, he wrote to parliament speaker Ali Larijani, asking to meet with him, President Mahmoud Ahmadinejad, judiciary chief Ayatollah Sadeq Larijani, former president Akbar Hashemi Rafsanjani and the state prosecutor to "personally present my documents and evidence over the cases of sexual abuse in some prisons specially Kahrizak detention center."

Ali Larijani and Sadeq Larijani both officially rejected his claims and Ali Khamenei's representatives and vice chairman of National Security Commission of the parliament demanded Karroubi's arrest. Karroubi also raised concerns about the 2009 Iranian presidential election, alleging that the results had been rigged, and accused Supreme Leader Ali Khamenei of endorsing the alleged fraud and supporting the deadly crackdown on the ensuing Green Movement protests.

=== Attacks ===
On 8 January 2010, Karroubi's son, Hussein Karroubi reported on Karroubi's website, Saham News, that shots had been fired at his armored car by pro-government demonstrators in Qazvin. Demonstrators also threw "bricks and rocks" at the flat where he was staying. The New York Times newspaper reported that he "has been pushed and shoved" and had a shoe thrown "at him—a grave insult in Iran"—since the election. "But this was the first time someone shot at him."

On 2 September 2010, 20 members of the Basij militia broke into Karroubi's apartment building. They shot at the building, set small fires in the courtyard, the lobby, vandalized parts of the building, cut water pipes to the apartment and tried to cut power on the street. This was the fourth consecutive night that Karroubi's apartment has come under attack. Karroubi's son, Mohammad Taghi Karroubi, said he heard several of the men say they were there to kill his father. Several of Karroubi's security team were injured when pleading with the gathering to stay outside the building to no avail. The head of a security team protecting Karroubi was in a coma after being beaten, as he tried to talk with a group of attackers.

=== House arrest ===
In the wake of the Tunisian and Egyptian revolutions, Green movement leaders in Iran called for demonstrations on 14 February 2011. The government responded by placing leaders of the movement under house arrest and on 14 February Iranian state TV broadcast images of "some 50 conservative MPs marching through parliament's main hall" chanting "Death to Mousavi, death to Karroubi". A statement issued by conservative Iranian parliamentarians carried by the official Islamic Republic News Agency said: "Mehdi Karroubi and Mir Hossein Mousavi are corrupts on earth and should be tried." "Corrupt on earth" (Mofsed-e-filarz) is a capital crime sometimes levied against political dissidents in the Islamic Republic of Iran. According to reports, Karroubi, fellow Iranian opposition leader Mir-Hossein Mousavi, and their wives Fatemeh Karroubi and Zahra Rahnavard, were taken from their homes by security forces to Heshmatiyeh Prison in Tehran in February 2011.

=== Hunger strike ===
On 16 August 2017, Karroubi started a hunger strike in protest to his house arrest situation, calling for a public trial and demanding security agents to leave his house. He was 79 at the time and had undergone heart surgery only days earlier; he was taken to hospital after less than 24 hours and resumed eating after the government agreed to remove intelligence agents from his home. His demand for trial has not been granted.

== Personal life ==
Karroubi has been married to Fatemeh Karroubi, the daughter of an Aligoudarz mercantile family, since she was 14. In February 2026, his son Hossein Karroubi, a reformist political activist, was arrested after being summoned to Tehran's Culture and Media Prosecutor's Office.

Party political offices
New title Party established	General Secretary of Association of Combatant Clerics; 1988–2005	Succeeded by Mohammad Mousavi Khoeiniha
New title Party established	General Secretary of National Trust Party; 2005–present Served alongside: Rasoul Montajabnia (Acting: 2011–2018); Elias Hazrati (Acting: 2018–)	Incumbent
Political offices
Preceded by Akbar Hashemi Rafsanjani	Speaker of Parliament of Iran; 1989–1992	Succeeded by Ali Akbar Nategh Nouri
Preceded by Ali Akbar Nategh Nouri	Speaker of Parliament of Iran; 2000–2004	Succeeded by Gholam Ali Haddad-Adel
