= Alireza Mahjoub =

Iranian politician

- علیرضا محجوب
- Alireza Mahjoub (2005)

Member of the Parliament of Iran
- In office 12 July 2005 – 26 May 2020
- Constituency: Tehran, Rey, Shemiranat and Eslamshahr
- Majority: 1,355,673 (53%)
- In office 10 July 2001 – 28 May 2004
- Constituency: Tehran, Rey, Shemiranat and Eslamshahr
- Majority: 645,650 (21.3%)
- In office 28 May 1996 – 26 May 2000
- Constituency: Tehran, Rey, Shemiranat and Eslamshahr
- Majority: 410,998 (28.8%)

Personal details
- Born: 14 April 1958 (age 68) Morad Tappeh, Iran
- Party: Worker House; Islamic Labour Party
- Other political affiliations: Islamic Republican Party (1979-1987)
- Education: University of Tehran
- Website: alirezamahjoub.ir

Ali Reza Mahjoub (Persian: علیرضا محجوب; born 14 May 1958) is an Iranian reformist politician, trade unionist and workers' rights activist who was a member of the Iranian Parliament and head of its "Worker fraction". He is Secretary-General of Worker House, as well as member of Islamic Labour Party's central committee. He was founder of Islamic Republican Party's worker wing in 1980s. Mahjoub holds a B.A. in History from University of Tehran.

== Electoral history ==
Election		Votes	%	Rank	Result	Ref
1992	R1	No Data Available			Lost	
1996	R1	440,396	18.02	18th	Run-off	
1996	R2	▼411,431	▲28.74	17th	Won	
2000		No Data Available			Lost	
2001	BE	645,650	21.3	1st	Won	
2004	R1	▼207,030	▼10.49	31st	Run-off	
2005	R2	▲1,355,673	▲ ≈53	1st	Won	
2008	R1	▼308,429	▼17.72	32nd	Run-off	
2008	R2	▼260,296	▲38.87	11th	Won	
2012	R1	▼258,670	▼11.07	39th	Run-off	
2012	R2	▲262,375	▲23.29	24th	Won	
2016		▲1,311,375	▲40.38	4th	Won	
2020		▼95,393	▼5.18	34th	Lost	
2021	BE	▲98,823	▲5.54	3rd	Lost	

Party political offices
Preceded by Hossein Kamali	Secretary-General of the Worker House; 1990–present	Succeeded by Incumbent
