= Ali Akbar Nategh-Nuri =

Iranian cleric and politician

- علی‌اکبر ناطق نوری
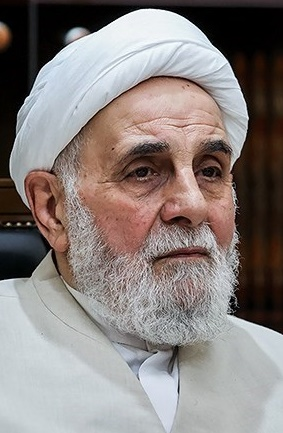
- Nategh-Nuri in 2023

Member of Expediency Discernment Council
- In office 28 May 2000 – 20 September 2022
- Appointed by: Ali Khamenei
- Chairman: Akbar Hashemi Rafsanjani; Ali Movahedi-Kermani (Acting); Mahmoud Hashemi Shahroudi; Sadeq Larijani

3rd Speaker of the Islamic Consultative Assembly
- In office 28 May 1992 – 27 May 2000
- Preceded by: Mehdi Karroubi
- Succeeded by: Mehdi Karroubi

Minister of the Interior
- In office 15 December 1981 – 28 October 1985
- President: Ali Khamenei
- Prime Minister: Mir-Hossein Mousavi
- Preceded by: Kamaleddin Nikravesh
- Succeeded by: Ali Akbar Mohtashamipur

Member of the Islamic Consultative Assembly
- In office 28 May 1980 – 15 December 1981
- Constituency: Tehran, Rey, Shemiranat and Eslamshahr
- Majority: 1,201,933 (56.3%)
- In office 21 September 1986 – 27 May 2000
- Constituency: Tehran, Rey, Shemiranat and Eslamshahr

Personal details
- Born: 6 October 1944 (age 81) Noor, Mazandaran, Iran
- Party: Combatant Clergy Association (Inactive since 2009)
- Other political affiliations: Islamic Republican Party (1979–1987); Islamic Coalition Party
- Education: University of Tehran

Ali Akbar Nategh-Nuri (Persian: علی‌اکبر ناطق نوری, romanized: ʿAlī Akbar Nāṭiq Nūrī; born 6 October 1944) is an Iranian politician, who served as the 3rd Speaker of the Islamic Consultative Assembly of Iran from 1992 to 2000. He was also the Minister of the Interior of Iran from 1981 to 1985.

== Career ==
Nuri was the interior minister of the Islamic Republic. He served as the Chairman of the Parliament from 1992 to 2000. He was a candidate in the 1997 Iranian presidential election. He was Khamanei's preferred candidate, but he lost the election to Muhammad Khatami. He was given nearly seven million votes, whereas Khatami twenty million votes. He served as an advisor to Iran's supreme leader until his resignation in 2017. He has been a supporter of President Hassan Rouhani and a critic of former Mahmoud Ahmadinejad. He officially visited Egypt in 2010. He was the first person to travel to Europe at the level of the heads of the three branches of the Islamic Republic of Iran.

== Remarks ==
Nuri was at the center of an international dispute in 2009 after he referred to Bahrain as Iran's 14th province. Bahrain paused negotiations with Iran regarding gas imports in response, and the Cooperation Council for the Arab States of the Gulf condemned the remarks. The Iranian foreign minister immediately commented on the controversy and stated that Nuri's remarks about the history of Bahrain had been misinterpreted by the media and that Iran respected Bahrain's sovereignty. Nuri himself told Al Jazeera that his remarks about the history of the region had been misunderstood and that his comment was not relevant to today's Iran-Bahrain relationship.

Government offices
Preceded by Kamaleddin Nikravesh	Minister of Interior of Iran; 1981–1985	Succeeded by Ali Akbar Mohtashami-Pur
Assembly seats
Preceded by Mehdi Karroubi	Speaker of the Parliament of Iran; 1992–2000	Succeeded by Mehdi Karroubi
Honorary titles
Preceded by Ali-Akbar Mousavi Hosseini	Most voted MP for Tehran, Rey, Shemiranat and Eslamshahr; 1996	Succeeded by Mohammad-Reza Khatami
