= Saeidi brothers =

- Born: October 30, 1981 (age 44) isfahan, Iran
- Genres: Persian traditional music
- Occupation: Singer
- Website: Official Website

Mohammad & Ali Saeidi( محمد و علی سعیدی) (born on October 30, 1981, in Isfahan) are Iranian traditional singers. They are considered the only Iranian twins singers.

== Biography ==
Mohammad & Ali Saeidi were born in 1981 in the city of Isfahan.

They learned Persian singing techniques and traditional singing styles (radifs) from the experts: Fazlullah Shahzamani, Mohammad Taghi Saeidi and Mohammad Ali Kianinejad. After three years, they succeeded in passing the breath taking and singing technique course with the distinguished and dominant “ney” (Persian musical instrument) player and composer, Mohammad Ali Kianinejad. Among their activities that can be regarded as in humanitarian work are the concerts for children with thalassemia (1996 at Tehran's Andisheh Hall) and album of silent citadel music (to assist cultural affairs of orphan children of Bam earthquake).

== Short Song Project ==
In 2020, Mohammad and Ali Saeidi have initiated Short Song project to enrich the daily lives of today's busy music lovers who do not have enough time to dedicate time for music but still want to enjoy and learn music. Saeidi brothers are trying to address this problem by recording short music videos that run less than one minute and each promotes one more Iranian art indirectly. Thus, they select one or two verses which are intended to be the point of each music video. The songs are performed in various gushehs, the totality of melodies of the Persian traditional music system.

== Official Activities ==
- Music concert at Rachmaninov Hall of the Tchaikovsky Conservatory together with the Tirgan group in Moscow
- Performance of some of the songs by Abdolhossein Barazandeh and his son, Jamshid Barazandeh, for IRIB Music Center to be broadcast from various national, provincial, and international Iranian TV networks, in the programs such as “The Poetry and Music Caravan”, “Morning Came…”, “Zeddehrood”, etc.
- Music of the TV serial “Qalicheh (Rug)”, with Delnavazan Music Group (1996)
- Concert in Germany (2009)
- Music of the TV serial “Posh-e Kouh ha-ye Boland (Behind the tall mountains)” (2012)
- “Arg-e Khamoush (The silent palace)” musical album (2014)
- The piece “Sarzamin-e ba Esalat (Land of originality)” (2018)
- The piece “Khial Angiz (Imaginative)” (2018)
- The piece “Negari Mani (You are my love)” – with Isfahani accent (2019)
- The piece “Gole Ranjideh (Suffered flowers)” (2019)
- The piece “Gisouye Negar (hair of Negar)” (2019)
