= National Trust Party (Iran) =

- Secretary-General: Elias Hazrati
- Spokesperson: Esmaeil Gerami-Moghaddam
- Founder: Mehdi Karroubi
- Legalized: 13 August 2005; 21 years ago
- Headquarters: Tehran
- Newspaper: Etemad-e Melli
- Ideology: Reformism; Populism
- Electoral alliance: Reformists Coalition (2006); Popular Coalition of Reforms (2008); List of Hope (2016, 2017)
- Tehran City Council: 0 / 21
- Isfahan City Council: 0 / 13
- Shiraz City Council: 0 / 13

Website
- etemad-melli.com

The National Trust Party (Persian: حزب اعتماد ملی, romanized: Ḥezb-e Eʿtemād-e Mellī), also translated as the National Confidence Party, is an Iranian political party based on a reformist and populist message. It was established in 2005 by former Parliament speaker Mehdi Karroubi following his defeat in the 2005 Iranian presidential election. The National Trust Party cooperates with the Reformists' Supreme Council for Policymaking.

== Platform ==
The party has opposed dictating the state religion in Iran and called for an amendment for the constitution of Iran that would limit the absolute power of the supreme leader, while endorsing Guardianship of the Islamic Jurist. In foreign policy, it wants détente with the United States. The party regards itself as being committed to the political thought and legacy of Ruhollah Khomeini.

Writing in Iranian Studies, Kaveh-Cyrus Sanandaji states that the party projects a more moderate-reformist platform than the mainstream reformist current associated with Mohammad Khatami, given that it purportedly "does not question the Islamic character of the regime". According to Muhammad Sahimi, the party has tried to attract the disaffected reformists who are not happy with the Participation Front, Mojahedin, or the Executives of Construction and "is more like a moderate right-wing party than a true reformist/democratic organization".

== Members ==
=== Party leaders ===
Secretaries-general
Name	Tenure	Ref
Mehdi Karoubi	2005–2021	
Elias Hazrati	2021–	

Deputy secretaries-general
Name	Tenure	Ref
Rasoul Montajabnia	2005–2018	
Elias Hazrati	2018–2021	
TBA		

=== Current officeholders ===
Cabinet

- Masoud Soltanifar, Minister of Youth and Sports
