= Meysam Saeidi =

Iranian politician

Mohammad-Reza Saeidparchin

Member of the Parliament of Iran
- In office 28 May 2000 – 28 May 2004
- Constituency: Tehran, Rey, Shemiranat and Eslamshahr
- Majority: 1,025,495 (34.98%)

Personal details
- Born: Mohammad-Reza Saeidparchin c. 1975 (age 50–51) ardebil, Iran
- Party: Islamic Iran Participation Front

Mohammad-Reza "Mohammad-Reza" Saeidi (Persian: محمدرضا سعیدی) is an Iranian reformist politician who served a member of the Parliament of Iran from 2000 to 2004 representing Tehran, Rey, Shemiranat and Eslamshahr.
