= Emad Afroogh =

Iranian sociologist and politician (1958–2023)

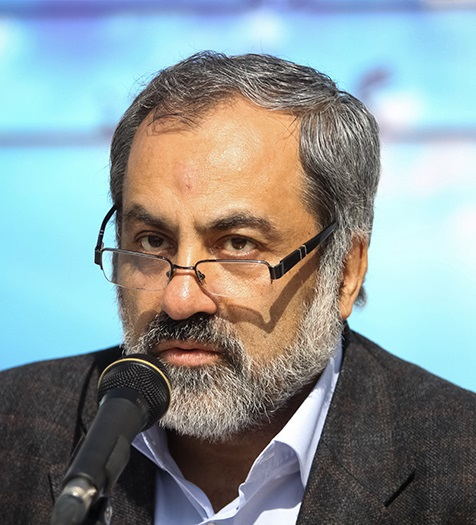

Member of Parliament of Iran
- In office 28 May 2004 – 28 May 2008
- Constituency: Tehran, Rey, Shemiranat and Eslamshahr
- Majority: 567,939

Personal details
- Born: 16 January 1958 Shiraz, Iran
- Died: 14 April 2023 (aged 65)
- Party: Coalition of Iran's Independent Volunteers
- Other political affiliations: Alliance of Builders of Islamic Iran
- Education: Shiraz University; Tarbiat Modares University

Emad Afroogh (Persian: عماد افروغ; 16 January 1958 – 14 April 2023) was an Iranian sociologist and conservative politician.

== Biography ==
Afroogh was born in Shiraz on 16 January 1958. He studied at Shiraz University and Tarbiat Modares University. He was a member of the Iranian parliament (2004–2008).

Afroogh was regarded as having staunch anti-globalization and anti-capitalism views. He once alleged that "Jewish rabbis" were responsible for Sunni imam Yusuf al-Qaradawi's shift away from his previous moderation toward Shi'ites.

Afroogh died from complications of cancer on 14 April 2023, at the age of 65.
