= Majid Ansari =

Iranian politician and cleric (born 1954)

- مجید انصاری
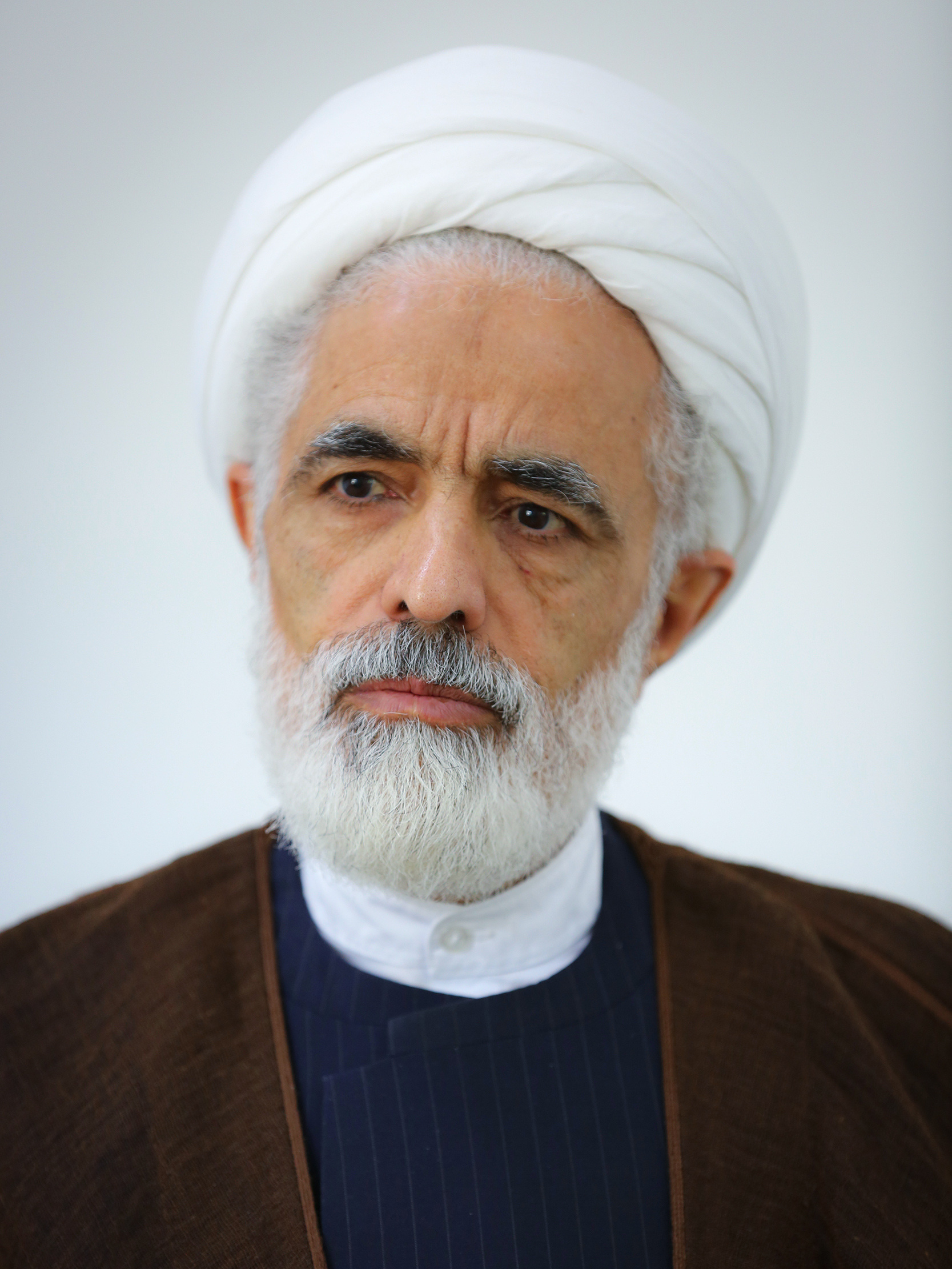
- Ansari in 2021

Vice President of Iran for Legal Affairs
- Incumbent
- Assumed office 22 August 2024
- President: Masoud Pezeshkian
- Preceded by: Mohammad Dehghan
- In office 12 July 2016 – 9 August 2017
- President: Hassan Rouhani
- Preceded by: Elham Aminzadeh
- Succeeded by: Laya Joneydi

Vice President of Iran for Parliamentary Affairs
- In office 1 September 2013 – 12 July 2016
- President: Hassan Rouhani
- Preceded by: Lotfollah Forouzandeh
- Succeeded by: Hossein Ali Amiri
- In office 12 October 2004 – 29 August 2005
- President: Mohammad Khatami
- Preceded by: Mohammad-Ali Abtahi
- Succeeded by: Seyyed Ahmad Mousavi (Parliamentary and Legal Affairs)

Member of Expediency Discernment Council
- Incumbent
- Assumed office 16 March 2002
- Appointed by: Ali Khamenei
- Chairman: Akbar Hashemi Rafsanjani; Ali Movahedi-Kermani (Acting); Mahmoud Hashemi Shahroudi; Sadeq Larijani

Member of Parliament of Iran
- In office 1980–2004
- Constituency: Kerman

Personal details
- Born: 30 March 1954 (age 72) Khanuk, Iran
- Party: Association of Combatant Clerics

Majid Ansari (Persian: مجید انصاری; born 30 March 1954) is an Iranian politician and cleric. He is currently member of the Expediency Discernment Council and Vice President for Legal Affairs since 2024 for second term. He was formerly Vice President for Legal Affairs from 2016 to 2017.

Previously held vice presidency in parliamentary affairs from 2004 to 2005, appointed by President Mohammad Khatami and the second term from 2013 to 2016 under President Hassan Rouhani. On 2 August 2017, Ansari announced that he will not be part of second Rouhani government. Ansari is also a former representative to the Assembly of Experts. Politically, he is a member of the Central Council of Association of Combatant Clerics.

Previously, he has been a representative of Tehran in the Parliament of Iran until 2004. Ansari has openly supported Sadegh Khalkhali, the hanging judge and his serial executions.

Assembly seats
Preceded by Abdollah Nouri	Parliamentary leader of reformists Head of Hezbollah Assembly; 1997–2000	Succeeded by Ali Akbar Mohtashamipur as Head of 2nd of Khordad fraction
Party political offices
New title	Head of Association of Combatant Clerics's parliamentary group 2000–2004; 1992–1996	Vacant
