= Jamileh Kadivar =

Iranian politician

Member of the Parliament of Iran
- In office 1 June 2000 – 28 May 2004
- Constituency: Tehran, Rey, Shemiranat and Eslamshahr
- Majority: 1,377,746 (47%)

Member of the City Council of Tehran
- In office 29 April 1999 – 3 January 2000
- Majority: 369,669 (26.34%)

Personal details
- Born: Jamileh Kadivar; December 15, 1963 (age 62) Fasa, Iran
- Party: Women's Journalist Association
- Spouse: Ata'ollah Mohajerani
- Children: 4
- Relatives: Mohsen Kadivar (brother)
- Education: University of Tehran
- Website: kadivar.maktuob.net

Jamileh Kadivar (Persian: جمیله کدیور) is an Iranian politician and a former member of parliament.

== Biography ==
Kadivar was born in Fasa, a town near Shiraz in southern Iran. She attended school in Shiraz until she was 16 years old, when she moved to Tehran to get married. Her spouse is former Minister of Culture of Iran Ata'ollah Mohajerani and they have four children. Her brother is well-known Muslim scholar Mohsen Kadivar. She was one of the attendees of the Berlin conference and in November 2000 went on trial for taking part in anti-government and anti-Islamic activities.
