= Association of Combatant Clerics =

Association of Combatant Clerics Persian: مجمع روحانیون مبارز
- General Secretary: Mohammad Mousavi Khoeiniha
- Spokesperson: Majid Ansari
- Head of Council: Mohammad Khatami
- Founded: March 16, 1988; 38 years ago
- Legalized: February 7, 1989; 37 years ago
- Split from: Combatant Clergy Association
- Headquarters: Tehran, Iran
- Newspaper: Salam
- Ideology: Reformism (Iranian); Clericalism (Iranian); Islamic liberalism; Islamic democracy; Historical: Social justice
- Political position: Centre to centre-left
- National affiliation: Council for Coordinating the Reforms Front
- Other affiliation: Coalition For Iran (2004)
- Politics of Iran; Political parties; Elections; A: Association of Combatant Clerics is a "left-wing" party in the Iran's political position.

The Association of Combatant Clerics (Note: The party's name has been alternately translated Association of Militant Clergy, Assembly of Combatant Clerics, and Combatant Clerics League) (Persian: مجمع روحانیون مبارز, romanized: Majma'-e rowhāniyūn-e mobārez) is an Iranian reformist clerical political party. It is regarded as a left-wing party within the Iranian political spectrum.

== History ==
Party's old logo

The Association of Combatant Clerics was founded in 1987 after abolition of the Islamic Republican Party, the last political party of that time. The association was originally radical, populist, rather than reformist in orientation, and favored a focus "on exporting the revolution and calling for the state's monopoly over the economy," rather than democracy and freedom of expression. As of 2007, it advocated limits on clerical power in Iranian politics and extending individual freedoms—though not to the extent that might "lead to secularism or liberalism."

After the resignation of Mehdi Karroubi from the post of secretary general, the party had no secretary general until late August 2005, when Mohammad Mousavi Khoeiniha was elected as the new secretary general. Former President of Iran Mohammad Khatami is the Chairman of the association's Central Council.

== Members ==
According to Muhammad Sahimi, the party "has a significant number of followers and sympathizers among the younger clerics".

=== Central council members ===
28 members of the party's central council are:

- Mohammad Mousavi Khoeiniha (Secretary-General)
- Majid Ansari (Speaker)
- Mohammad Khatami (Head of Council)
- Mohammad Hashemi
- Hadi Khamenei
- Ali Ajam
- Mohammad-Ali Abtahi
- Mohammad-Ali Ansari
- Mohammad Mousavi-Bojnourdi
- Issa Velayi
- Mohammad Razavi
- Seyyed Mohammad Hashemi
- Ali-Akbar Ashtiani
- Mohammad-Ali Khosravi
- Taqi Durchih'i
- Serajeddin Mousavi
- Ali Mohammad Dastgheib Shirazi
- Fazel Ferdosi
- Ali-Asghar Rahmani Khalili
- Assadollah Kian-Ersi
- Mohammad Moghaddam
- Mojtaba Nourmofidi
- Mohammad-Ali Nezamzadeh
- Mehdi Emam-Jamarani
- Abdolvahed Mousavi-Lari
- Mohammad-Ali Sadoughi
- Asadollah Bayat-Zanjani

=== Other members ===
- Mehdi Karroubi (former member)
- Sadegh Khalkhali (deceased)
- Ali Akbar Mohtashamipur (deceased)
- Hadi Ghaffari
- Rasoul Montajabnia
- Abdollah Nouri
- Mohammad-Reza Tavassoli (deceased)
- Hassan Sane'i
- Mahmoud Doayi
- Ghodratollah Alikhani
- Mohammad-Ali Rahmani

== See also ==
- Political parties in Iran
- Clericalism in Iran
