= Ata'ollah Mohajerani =

Iranian politician

Seyyed Ata'ollah Mohajerani
- عطاءالله مهاجرانی
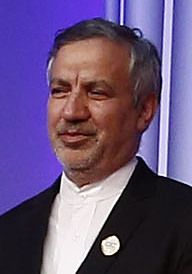

Minister of Culture and Islamic Guidance
- In office 20 August 1997 – 14 December 2000
- President: Mohammad Khatami
- Preceded by: Mostafa Mir-Salim
- Succeeded by: Ahmad Masjed-Jamei

Vice President of Iran for Legal and Parliamentary Affairs
- In office 1989–1997
- President: Akbar Hashemi Rafsanjani
- Succeeded by: Abdolvahed Mousavi Lari

Deputy Prime Minister of Iran for Legal and Parliamentary Affairs
- In office 1985–1989
- Prime Minister: Mir-Hossein Mousavi

Member of the Parliament of Iran
- In office 28 May 1980 – 28 May 1984
- Constituency: Shiraz
- Majority: 122,678 (79.8%)

Personal details
- Born: 24 July 1954 (age 72) Arak, Markazi province, Imperial State of Iran
- Party: Executives of Construction Party
- Spouse: Jamileh Kadivar
- Children: 4
- Education: University of Isfahan; Shiraz University; Tarbiat Modares University
- Website: mohajerani.maktuob.net

Ata'ollah Mohajerani (Persian: عطاءالله مهاجرانی, also Romanized as Atā'ollāh Mohājerāni; born 24 July 1954) is an Iranian journalist, author, and reformist politician. Mohajerani served as Minister of Culture and Islamic Guidance of Iran under President Mohammad Khatami from 1997 until 2000 when he was fired from office for alleged "permissiveness". He is living as a UK citizen.

== Education ==
Mohajerani received his bachelor's degree in history from the University of Isfahan, his master's degree in history and Iranian culture from Shiraz University, and his Ph.D. in history from Tarbiat Modares University.

== Career ==
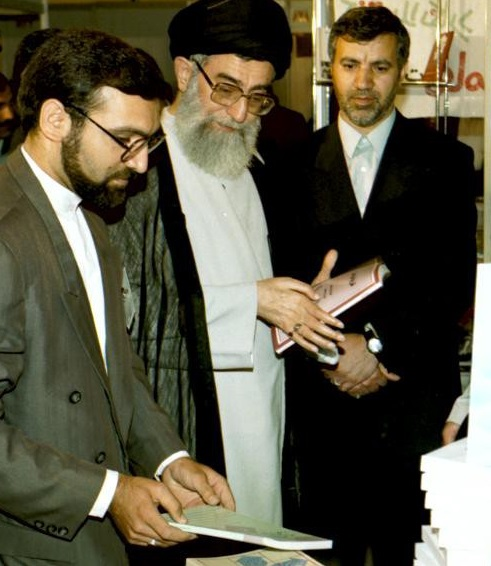
Mohajerani (first from right) as Minister of Culture with Ali Khamenei in Tehran International Book Fair, 26 May 1998

Mohajerani's political career began in 1980 after the Iranian Revolution, when he won the first round of the parliamentary elections to become a representative of Shiraz and the youngest member of the majlis. Later, he became the Parliamentary Deputy to the Prime Minister Mir-Hossein Mousavi, when he started to write the weekly column Naghd-e Haal in the Ettela'at newspaper, and then Vice President of Parliamentary Affairs under Ali Akbar Hashemi Rafsanjani.

As minister of culture and Islamic guidance, he officially announced and pursued a policy of "leniency" (Persian: تساهل و تسامح) towards the field of culture and arts and removed many restrictions. He earned the wrath of conservatives by allowing hundreds of new publications to start up, the release of fifty-some Persian pop music albums, and the screening of the controversial movie Two Women.

He survived impeachment by the 5th Majlis which was dominated by the conservatives in part with a "daring" speech defending the principle of freedom of speech in Islamic rather than Western terms.

Why does the Quran carry the harshest criticism of the Prophet? ... It was not in the nature of the Prophet to stifle discussion of opposing points of view.

In April 2000, however, he resigned due to heavy criticisms by the Iranian Supreme Leader, Ayatollah Khamenei, because of his "liberal" policies. He also served as the speaker of the cabinet during that time. He later became the president of the Iranian International Centre for Dialogue among Civilizations, but resigned from the post.

He was a member and a founder of Executives of Construction Party, which is considered a backer of Ali Akbar Hashemi Rafsanjani.

Mohajerani participated in the funeral and burial of former revolutionary Prime Minister Mehdi Bazargan, when few Iranian officials dared doing so because of Bazargan's very unpopular status among the higher ranks of the Islamic Republic government.

=== Works ===
Of the books Mohajerani has written, most famous are a "learned critique" of the Salman Rushdie novel Satanic Verses, a book in support of Ferdowsi (and against attacks by Ahmad Shamlou), and a book on Zaynab bint Ali's role in and after Aashurah. His other publications/works include:

- Gray heaven/paradise, 2007.
- Mohajerani, Ata'ollah (2018). Haj Akhund. p. 282. ISBN 978-9-649-57439-4.
- Mohajerani, Ata'ollah; Khaniki, Hadi; Tabatabaii, Sadegh; Ameli, Saeed Reza (2003). "Dialogue (1)". National Studies. 3 (4): 197.
- Mohajerani, Ata'ollah; Khaniki, Hadi; Tabatabaii, Sadegh; Ameli, Saeed Reza; Ghaem, Mahdi Montazer (2003). "Dialogue (2)". National Studies. 4 (1): 227.

== Personal life ==
Mohajerani is married to Jamileh Kadivar, who is also a reformist politician and a former member of parliament.

Mohajerani left Iran and as of 2009 lives in England with his wife. They launched a website called www.maktoub.ir.

Mohajerani is "a vocal supporter of the pro-democracy Green Movement," and opposes violence against the Iranian government saying "If we answer violence with violence, we are no different from them."

== Advocating Khomeini's order to kill British author ==
After Ruhollah Khomeini issued a fatwa ordering Muslims to kill Salman Rushdie because of his novel The Satanic Verses, Mohajerani published a book called Critique of the Satanic Verses Conspiracy in 1989. Mohajarani quoted Khomeini's fatwa at the beginning of his book and approved and justified the fatwa. In 1995, Mohajerani wrote a short story gleefully satirising this British writer's fear of being attacked. Responding to Khomeini's Fatwa, on July 2, 1993, unknown assailants set fire to a hotel in the Turkish city of Sivas that was hosting a speech by Aziz Nesin, a renowned humorist who had translated the book into Turkish. A total of 35 people plus two perpetrators were killed in the blaze, and 145 people were injured. Mohajirani insisted that the massacre was a proud moment in what he called the glorious Islamic reawakening and wrote that Khomeini's fatwa had worked like a vaccine preventing further criticism of the prophet of Islam. So far, no proper study has been conducted into the role of Mohajerani and his book in promoting this massacre of intellectuals, translators and publishers worldwide.

In January 2023, The Guardian reported that the Metropolitan Police was reviewing a legal dossier filed in August 2022 that accused Mohajerani of encouraging terrorism contrary to the Terrorism Act 2006.
