= Elias Hazrati =

Iranian journalist and politician

Sardar Elias Hazrati
- الیاس حضرتی
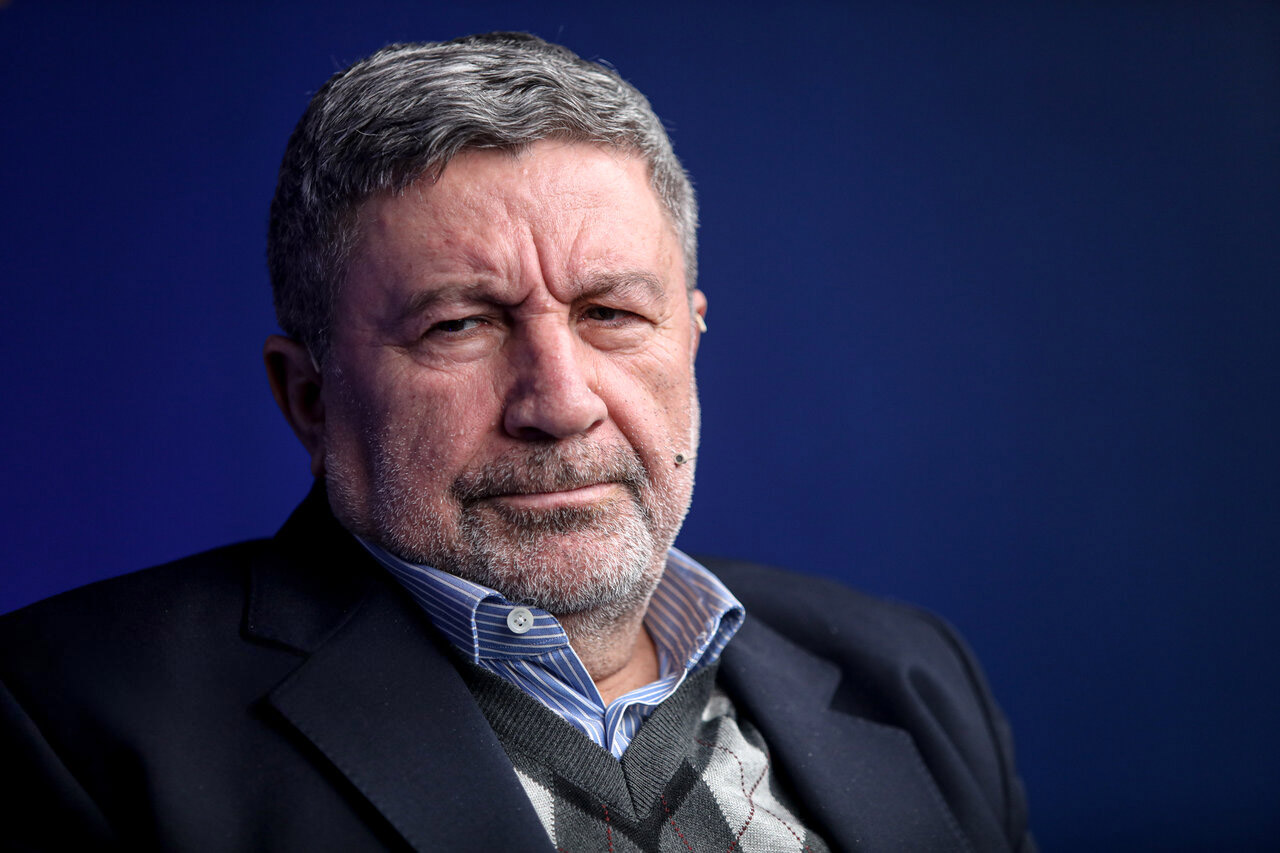
- Hazrati in 2025

Member of the Parliament of Iran
- In office 28 May 2016 – 26 May 2020
- Constituency: Tehran, Rey, Shemiranat and Eslamshahr
- In office 27 May 2000 – 26 May 2004
- Constituency: Tehran, Rey, Shemiranat and Eslamshahr
- In office 27 May 1988 – 26 May 2000
- Constituency: Rasht

Personal details
- Born: 13 March 1961 (age 65) Hashtrud, Iran
- Party: National Trust Party (2005–)
- Other political affiliations: Islamic Iran Solidarity Party (1998–2005)

Military service
- Allegiance: Revolutionary Guards
- Years of service: 1979–1984
- Commands: Gilan Corps
- Battles/wars: Iran–Iraq War

Elias Hazrati (born 13 March 1961) is an Iranian politician, journalist and former military officer. Who serving as Head of the Government Information Council since 28 August 2024. He was a member of the Parliament of Iran from 1988 until 2004 and also from 2016 to 2020. He is currently the editor-in-chief of the daily newspaper Etemad.

== Career ==
He left the army in 1984 and was elected as a member of the parliament from Rasht in the 1988 election. He was also re-elected in 1992, 1996 and 2000 but he did not seek re-election in the 2004 election. After reaching the tenth parliament, he spoke in Islamic Association of Gilan Azeris.

Media offices
Preceded by None	Editor of Etemad; 2001–present	Succeeded by Incumbent
Party political offices
Preceded by Rasoul Montajabnia	Deputy General-Secretary of National Trust Party; 2018–2021; Acting General Secretary: 2018–2021	Succeeded by TBA
New title	Head of Islamic Iran Solidarity Party's parliamentary group 2000–2004	Vacant
Preceded by Davoud Mohammadi as Islamic Association of Teachers of Iran representative	Rotating President of the Council for Coordinating the Reforms Front; 23 October 2018 –27 January 2019	Succeeded by Fatemeh Rakeei as Society of Modern-Thinking Muslim Women representative
