= Ali Abbaspour Tehrani-Fard =

Iranian politician

Ali Abbaspour
- علی عباسپور

Member of the Parliament of Iran
- In office 28 May 2004 – 28 May 2012
- Constituency: Tehran, Rey, Shemiranat and Eslamshahr
- In office 28 May 1992 – 28 May 2000
- Constituency: Tehran, Rey, Shemiranat and Eslamshahr

Personal details
- Born: 18 March 1950 (age 76) Iran
- Party: Islamic Coalition Party
- Other political affiliations: Front of Followers of the Line of the Imam and the Leader; Alliance of Builders of Islamic Iran (2004); United Front of Principlists (2008); Principlists Pervasive Coalition (2008)
- Education: University of California, Berkeley; Massachusetts Institute of Technology; University of Tehran; Amirkabir University of Technology
- Website: sharif.edu

Ali Abbaspour Tehrani Fard (Persian: علی عباس‌پور طهرانی‌فرد) is an Iranian academic and principlist politician. He is a professor of electrical engineering at Sharif University of Technology and served as the president of the Islamic Azad University, Science and Research Branch, Tehran from 2012 to 2017.

== Education ==
Ali Abbaspoor Tehrani Fard earned a bachelor of science in electrical engineering, ranking in first place in his class from Amirkabir University of Technology and a master's degree in electrical engineering from the University of Tehran with highest distinction. With a scholarship from MIT, Tehrani-Fard earned a master's degrees from MIT in Electrical Engineering, and in 1983 he earned his Ph.D. in electrical engineering from the University of California at Berkeley, USA.

After obtaining his Ph.D. from the University of California at Berkeley, Tehrani-Fard returned to Iran and joined the Faculty of Electrical Engineering as an assistant professor at the Sharif University of Technology. Later, he served as the President of Sharif University of Technology.

== Career ==
Ali Abbaspoor Tehrani Fard was elected as a representative of Tehran in the fourth and fifth terms of Iran’s Parliament. Presently, he is the Chairman of Iran's (Majlis) Parliamentary Committee on Education and Research and has been elected to the presidency of the Forum of Asia-Pacific Parliamentarians for Education (FASPPED). Presently, Tehrani-Frad is campaigning for parliamentary elections to represent Tehran as an ultraconservative.
