= Rasoul Montajabnia =

Iranian cleric and politician

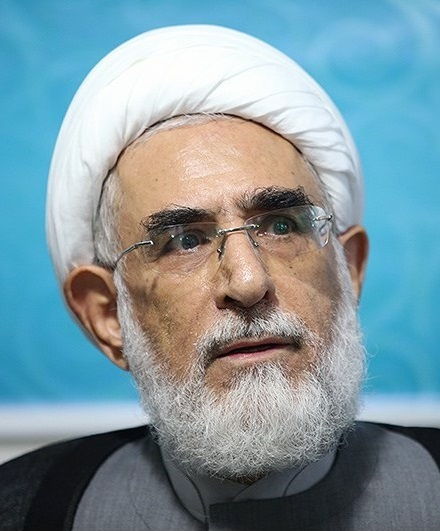

Member of Parliament of Iran
- In office 28 May 1980 – 28 May 1992
- Constituency: Shiraz
- Majority: 141,116 (42.6%)

Personal details
- Born: 13 July 1948 (age 78) Shiraz, Imperial State of Iran
- Party: National Trust Party
- Other political affiliations: Association of Combatant Clerics (1988–2005); Combatant Clergy Association (1979–1988); Islamic Republican Party (1979–1987)
- Website: Official website

Rasoul Montajabnia (Persian: رسول منتجب‌نیا; born 13 July 1948 in Shiraz) is an Iranian reformist politician, jurist, vice president, and founding member of the National Trust Party (Iran). He is also a former Assembly of Combatant Clergymen member and director of the university of jurisprudence Control.

Rasoul Montajabnia was representative first three periods of parliament, head of the parliamentary defense committee Third, the representative of the Islamic Republic Imam Khomeini and the head of the national Iran police, an adviser to President Khatami, vice president of Command Seal of Command and General Staff of Defense, a member of the Islamic Republic of Iran and the representative of the Supreme Leader Iran's Islamic community were teachers.

Party political offices
New title Party established	Deputy General-Secretary of National Trust Party; 2005–2018; Acting General Secretary: 2011–2018	Succeeded by Elias Hazrati
