= Saeed Laylaz =

Iranian economist and journalist

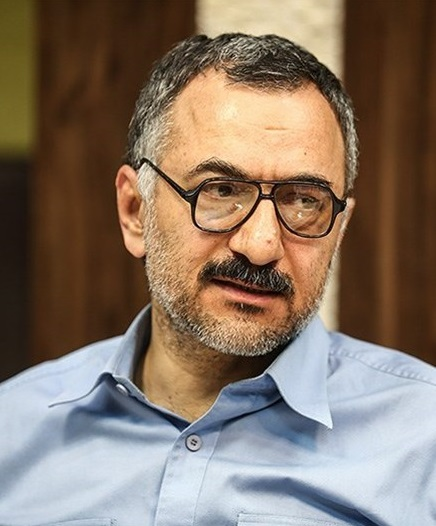
- Occupations: Economist; Journalist
- Employer: Shahid Beheshti University
- Known for: 2009 imprisonment
- Political party: Executives of Construction Party
- Spouse: Sepehrnaz Panahi
- Children: 2

Saeed Laylaz (Persian: سعید لیلاز) is an Iranian economist, journalist, and a former advisor to President Mohammad Khatami. Laylaz was a pro-reform critic of President Mahmoud Ahmadinejad and was arrested as part of a general crackdown during the 2009–2010 Iranian election protests; his newspaper, the business daily Sarmayeh, was banned by government censors in November 2009. He is a professor at Tehran's Shahid Beheshti University.

== 2009 arrest ==
During the 2009 Iranian presidential election, Laylaz was a key adviser in the campaign of opposition candidate Mir Hossein Mousavi. After President Mahmoud Ahmadinejad was re-elected amid allegations of voter fraud in June, Iran saw widespread protests.

On 17 June, Laylaz was arrested as part of a general crackdown on journalists. A Sarmayeh husband-and-wife team, editor Bahman Ahmadi Amouee and reporter Jila Baniyaghoob, were arrested three days later. On 2 December 2009, Laylaz was found guilty of "taking part in illegal gatherings" and "holding classified information", and was sentenced to nine years' imprisonment. In March 2010, the sentence was reduced on appeal to three years.

Laylaz's imprisonment drew international attention and protest from NGOs. Amnesty International designated him a prisoner of conscience, "detained solely for [his] peaceful exercise of the right to freedom of expression", and called for his immediate release. Human Rights Watch called on the Iranian government to "halt the crackdown" and release Laylaz and the other detained. The Committee to Protect Journalists described itself as "deeply concerned" by the sentence, calling it "highly politicized and unjustified". Reporters Without Borders listed it as a "Press Freedom Violation".

== Personal life ==
Laylaz is married to Sepehrnaz Panahi, with whom he has a daughter, Shahrzad, and a son, Mohammad-Hossein.

Party political offices
| Preceded by Hossein Marashi | Deputy Secretary-General of Executives of Construction Party; 2014–2019 | Succeeded by Alireza Siasirad |
Media offices
| Preceded by Mohammad Ghouchani | Editor-in-Chief of Seda; 2014–2015 | Succeeded by Mohammad Ghouchani |
