= Sazandegi =

- Type: Daily newspaper
- Format: Compact; digital
- Founder: Gholamhossein Karbaschi
- Editor-in-chief: Akbar Montajabi
- General manager: Afzal Mousavi
- Founded: 12 February 2018; 7 years ago
- Ceased publication: 10 November 2021
- Relaunched: 8 January 2022; 3 years ago
- Political alignment: Executives of Construction Party; Reformists
- Language: Persian
- City: Tehran
- Country: Iran
- Sister newspapers: Seda (2018–2019)
- Free online archives: 2018; no. 1–15

Sazandegi (Persian: سازندگی, lit. 'Construction') is an Iranian daily newspaper first published in 2018.

== History ==
It was edited by Mohammad Ghouchani. In June 2021, Sazandegi was sued by Mohammad Bagher Ghalibaf for featuring an illustration of him its cover. The portrait was based on a photography of the politician wiping sweat from his balding forehead.

== Political alignment ==
Sazandegi is reformist and the official organ of the Executives of Construction Party.
