= History of the Islamic Republic of Iran =

History of Iran after the 1979 revolution

The Islamic Republic of Iran (Note: Persian: جمهوری اسلامی ایران romanized: Jomhuri-ye Eslâmi-ye Irân) (Note: Also referred to as the Islamic Republic of Persia (IRP), Khomeinist Iran, Islamist Iran, the Mullahs' regime/Regime of the Mullahs, and the Khomeini/Khamenei regime.) is the current Iranian state that has existed since 1979, under the rule of a supreme leader and an Islamic theocracy.

One of the most dramatic changes in government in Iran's history was seen with the 1979 Iranian Revolution where Shah Mohammad Reza Pahlavi was overthrown and replaced by Ayatollah Ruhollah Khomeini. The authoritarian monarchy was replaced by a long-lasting Shiite Islamic republic based on the principle of guardianship of Islamic jurists, (or Velayat-e faqih), where Shiite jurists serve as head of state and in many powerful governmental roles. A pro-Western, pro-American foreign policy was, for the first Years in power, exchanged for one of "neither east nor west", said to rest on the three "pillars" of mandatory veil (hijab) for women, and opposition to the United States and Israel. A rapidly modernizing capitalist economy was replaced by a populist and Islamic economy and culture.

The leader of the revolution and founder of the Islamic Republic, Ayatollah Ruhollah Khomeini, was the supreme leader of Iran until his death in 1989. He was followed by Ali Khamenei.

From 1999 to present, there have been a series of political/social/economic protest movements in Iran, the July 1999 student protests, the June 2003 student protests, the 2009 to 2010 presidential election protests, the Arab spring protests in 2011 to 2012, the October 2016 Monarchist Revolt, the 2017 to 2018 Inflation demonstrations, the 2018 to 2019 General strikes and Bazaar mass closures, the 2019 to 2020 Bloody November/Aban Protests for Gas and Car Fuel, the 2021 to 2022 Water protests, the 2022-2023 Mahsa Amini protests, the March to December 2025 General strikes and water protests, and the 2026 Iranian Uprising and General strikes.

== General trends ==
During the era of the Islamic Republic, Iran has grown from 39 million (1980) to 81.16 million (2017) people.

Some things remain much as they were under the monarchy. Iran has retained its status as a major regional power—it is far larger than any of its Persian Gulf neighbors, and possesses larger reserves of gas and oil than all except Saudi Arabia. Its national cohesion brought by a long history as a nation, strong central state government and its oil export revenues have brought it "respectable" levels of income, literacy, college enrollment, infant mortality, and infrastructure. Modern trends found under the monarchy, such as urbanization, growing enrollment in higher education and literacy, continued.

=== Politics and government ===
The Islamic Republic of Iran is an Islamic theocracy headed by a supreme leader. Its constitution was approved in 1979 and amended in 1989. Jaafari (Usuli) school of thought is the official religion. Theocratic bodies supervise the government which has an elected president and elected governmental bodies at the national, provincial and local levels. All male and female citizens from the age of 18 on up may vote for candidates approved by the Council of Guardians which had veto power over who can run for parliament (the Islamic Consultative Assembly) and whether its bills can become law.

=== Foreign affairs ===
Following the 1979 revolution in Iran, the Islamic revolutionary regime of Ayatollah Khomeini dramatically reversed the pro-Western foreign policy of the regime it overthrew. Since then, Iran has oscillated between the two opposing tendencies of revolutionary ardour (promoting the Islamic revolution and struggling against non-Muslim tendencies abroad) and moves towards pragmatism (economic development and normalization of foreign relations). Khomeini's 1989 fatwa calling for the killing of British citizen Salman Rushdie for his allegedly blasphemous book, The Satanic Verses, demonstrated the willingness of the Islamic revolutionaries to sacrifice trade and other ties with western countries to threaten an individual citizen of a foreign country living thousands of miles away. On the other hand, Khomeini's death in 1989 led more pragmatic policies, with presidents Hashemi Rafsanjani and Mohammad Khatami leading the charge for more stable relations with the west as well as its surrounding, non-Revolutionary-Islamic neighbors—i.e., Saudi Arabia. Following the 2005 election of President Mahmoud Ahmedinejad, Iran has returned to a more hardline stance, frequently antagonizing the west and its neighbors while battling for control over the region.

In the immediate aftermath of the revolution, the Islamic Republic went to war against Saddam Hussein's Iraq after the latter launched a military invasion in the 1980s. With most foreign aid going to Iraq, Iran was forced to accept a ceasefire by 1988. Tensions with Iraq remained long after the war; it was not until the death of Saddam himself that Iran and Iraq have started improving their relations.

The Islamic Republic founded and sponsored the Lebanese group known as Hezbollah; its leaders were followers of Khomeini. The creation of Hezbollah, and its funding from Iran, was in response to the Israeli occupation of Lebanon. Since then, Hezbollah has served as both an ally and a surrogate for Iran during its conflict with America and Israel. Author Olivier Roy describes the Islamic Republic's as having "lost most of its allure among non-Iranian Shia's", giving as examples the 1995 house arrest in Qom of the two sons of Grand Ayatollah Shirazi, spiritual leader of the Bahraini Shia; and the close cooperation between the Afghan Shia party Wahdat and the U.S. Army after November 2001.

The Islamic Republic strongly supports the Palestinian cause. Government aid goes to everything from Palestinian hospitals to arms supplies. There is vigorous media publicity, an official "Quds (Jerusalem) Day", and squares and streets named after Palestine crisscross Iranian cities. Some question whether the issue has domestic grassroots support, arguing that Iranians "lack emotional and cultural ties to Palestinians", or has been too costly in terms of opportunity cost compared to peaceful coexistence.

=== Human development ===
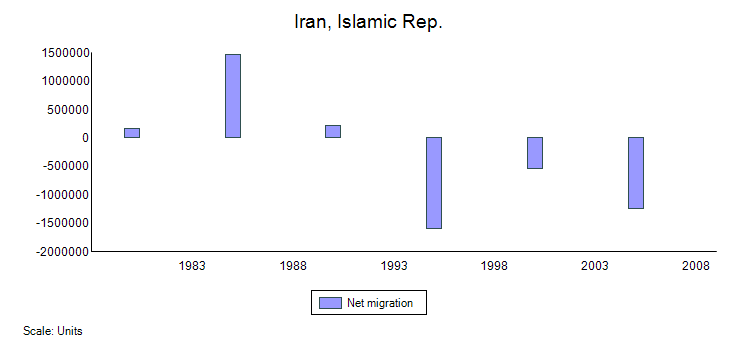
Net Iranian migration (1979–2008). A positive value represents more people entering Iran than leaving the country.

Despite stagnation in the economy, Iran's Human Development Index rating (including life expectancy, literacy, education, and standard of living) improved significantly in the years after the revolution, climbing from 0.569 in 1980 to 0.759 in 2007/8. It now ranks 94th out of 177 countries with data. This is approximately the same rate, as neighbor Turkey which has a somewhat higher HDI rating (0.775). One factor in the HDI rise has been literacy rates among Iranian women which "rose from 28% to 80% between 1976 and 1996".

Although the Shah's regime had created a popular and successful Literacy Corps and also worked to raise literacy rates, the Islamic Republic based its educational reforms on Islamic principles. The Literacy Movement Organization (LMO), replaced the Literacy Corps following the revolution and is credited with much of Iran's continued success in reducing illiteracy from 52.5 per cent in 1976 to just 24 per cent, at the last count in 2002. The movement has established over 2,000 community learning centers across the country, employed some 55,000 instructors, distributed 300 easy-to-read books and manuals, and provided literacy classes to a million people, men as well as women. The increase in literacy "meant that for the first time in history most of the population, including Azeris, Kurds, Gilakis, and Mazanderanis, could converse and read in Persian".

In the field of health, maternal and infant mortality rates have been cut significantly. Infant mortality per 1000 dropped from 104 to 25.

In particular conditions improved in the countryside. The Reconstruction Jihad "extended roads, electricity, piped water, and most important of all, health clinics into villages. ... turning peasants into farmers. Soon most farmers had access not only to roads, schools, ... but also ... radios, refrigerators, telephones, televisions, motorbikes, even pickup trucks. ... on the eve of the revolution, life expectancy at birth had been less than 56; by the end of the century, it was near 70."

=== Economy ===
Under the Islamic Republic, Iran's economy has been dominated by oil and gas exports which constituted 70% of government revenue and 80% of export earnings as of 2008. It has a large public sector, with an estimated 60% of the economy directly controlled and centrally planned by the state. A unique feature of Iran's economy is the large size of the religious foundations, or Bonyads, whose combined budgets are said to make up as much as half that of the central government.

Top oil-producing countries

Economic problems include the shattering of the Iranian oil sector and consequent loss of output from the revolution and Iran–Iraq War (Iran sustained economic losses estimated at $500 billion), a soaring population over the same period, inefficiency in the state sector, dependence on petroleum exports, and corruption.

The constitution of the Islamic Republic calls for the state sector "to include all large-scale and mother industries, foreign trade", natural resources and communication; and calls on the private sector to "supplement the ... state and cooperative sectors".

The International Monetary Fund reports that Iran's gross national income per capita (PPP model) more than doubled since the revolution despite strong population growth—one year after the revolution it was $4,295 and grew to $11,396 by 2010.

However, complaining about the economy is said to have become "a national pastime" among Iranians. According to international economic consultant Jahangir Amuzegar, as of 2003:

Despite a 100 percent rise in average annual oil income since the revolution, most indicators of economic welfare have steadily deteriorated. ... Average inflation in the years after the revolution has been at least twice as high as during the 1970s, unemployment has been three times higher, and economic growth is two-thirds lower. As a result, Iran's per capita income has declined by at least 30 percent since 1979. By official admission, more than 15 percent of the population now lives below the absolute poverty line, and private estimates run as high as 40 percent.

Per capita income declines when the price of oil declines (per capita income reportedly fell at one point (1995) to 1/4 of what it was prior to the revolution); Accumulated assets of the Iranian middle class—carpets, gold, apartments—that were acquired in the four-year boom after the 1973 oil price rise and served to cushion the fall in standards of living, have now reportedly "largely been sold off".

The poor have also exhibited dissatisfaction. Absolute poverty rose by nearly 45% during the first 6 years of the Islamic revolution and on several occasions the mustaz'afin have rioted, protesting the demolition of their shantytowns and rising food prices. Disabled war veterans have demonstrated against mismanagement of the Foundation of the Disinherited. Hardship has compelled some children to take odd jobs rather than go to school.

A 2002 study leaked from Iran's Interior Ministry, reported nearly 90% of respondents dissatisfied with the present government according to Amuzegar. Of this total, 28% wanted "fundamental" changes, 66% "gradual reforms". 10% expressed satisfaction with the status quo.

According to British-Iranian scholar, Ali M. Ansari, "Iranians joke" that with the world's second or third largest reserves of oil and natural gas, extensive deposits of copper, gold, uranium, as well as an educated and cohesive workforce, "they are blessed with all the facilities to be the industrial engine of the region, except good governance".

==== Corruption ====
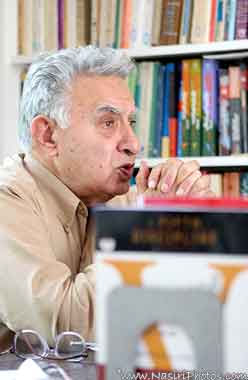
Sahabi family (Ezzatollah Sahabi, Yadollah and Haleh Sahabi), active members of National party were imprisoned.

Corruption is a problem in the Islamic Republic.

Bribery in Iran was increasingly becoming the biggest part of business deals—and a lot of other transactions too. Iranians called it "oiling the mustache", and it was commonly practiced before the revolution, but payoffs then were usually a one-time thing of a known amount. Two decades after the revolution, even the smallest service called for bribes to several different parties.

==== Emigration ====
Journalists report complaints that, "these days, if a student is lucky enough to study in the West, he will rarely come home. There are so few good jobs that everyone, from students to middle-aged engineers, is looking for a way out." An estimated "two to four million entrepreneurs, professionals, technicians, and skilled craftspeople (and their capital)" emigrated to other countries following the revolution. This flight of intellectual capital is estimated to have cost Iran $80–120 billion, where even the lower figures are greater than Iran's total oil revenues for 1989–1993.

Emigration from Iran, starting with young males fleeing from the Iran–Iraq War draft, is thought by some to be the feature of the Islamic Republic most resented by Iranians. According to Shirin Ebadi, "But if you ask most Iranians what keeneh, what grievance, they nurture most bitterly against the Islamic Republic, it is the tearing apart of their families ... had the revolutionaries tempered their wild radicalism, had they not replaced the Shah with a regime that prompted mass flight, their families would still be whole."

=== Society ===
While the revolution brought about some re-Islamisation of Iran, particularly in terms of personal appearance—beards, hijab—it has not prompted a reversal of some modernizing trends or a return to traditional patterns of family life, (such as polygamy and the extended family with numerous children).

Despite the lowering of the legal age of marriage for women fell to 9, and the Ayatollah Khomeini's support for early marriage for females,

It is recommended that one hurries in giving the husband to a daughter who has attained puberty, meaning that she is of the age of religious accountability. His Holiness, Sadegh [the 6th Imam] salutations to him, bade that it is one of a man's good fortunes that his daughter does not see menses in his own house.

the actual average age of marriage for women rose to 22 by 1996. Thus the age difference between husbands and wives in Iran actually fell between 1980 and 2000, from 7 to 2.1 years. (The man's average age at marriage has remained around 24.4 over the past 20 years, which means greater educational equality between spouses.)

Nor has Islamisation of family law lead to an increase in the number of polygamous families or more frequent divorces. Polygamy has remained at about 2% of permanent marriages during the past 40 years and the divorce rate has decreased slightly since the 1970s.

Population growth was encouraged for the first nine years of the revolution, but in 1988 youth unemployment concerns prompted the government to do "an amazing U-turn" and Iran now has "one of the world's most effective" family planning programs.

After the Iranian revolution, Iranian women have continued to occupy high positions in the political system. In the late 1990s, Iranians sent more women to Iranian parliament than Americans sent to U.S. senate.

Gharbzadegi ("westoxification") or western cultural influence stubbornly remains, entering via (illegal) music recordings, videos, and satellite dishes, despite government efforts. Compulsory hijab (veiling) for women has been given extensive police enforcement, Shorts, necklaces, "glamorous" hairstyles, and neckties (in government buildings) are forbidden for men. Western music is banned even more thoroughly, but observers note it is nonetheless popular and widespread. One post-revolutionary opinion poll found 61% of students in Tehran chose "Western artists" as their role models with only 17% choosing "Iran's officials".

=== Human rights ===
In the first five years of the Islamic Republic, during its consolidation, approximately 8,000 political opponents were executed. Thousands of political prisoners were also executed in 1988. Like other revolutions before it, the Iranian Revolution took a higher toll on those who had participated in the revolution than those in the regime it overthrew.

In the 21st century, the killing of dissidents has been much less frequent and reported abuses are more likely to include harsh penalties for crimes; punishment of fornication, homosexuality, apostasy, poor hijab (covering the head for women); restrictions on freedom of speech, and the press, including the imprisonment of journalists; unequal treatment according to religion and gender; torture to extract repudiations by prisoners of their cause and comrades on video for propaganda purposes, and allowing prisoners to die by withholding medical treatment.

An Iranian MP talks about more executions and more flogging. On 22 December 2018, Aziz Akbarian, chairman of the Parliament's Committee on Industries and Mines said in an interview with the local Alborz Radio, "If two people are thoroughly flogged and if two people are executed ... it will be a lesson for everyone else". Iran has the highest number of executions after China as of 2022, when 582 people were executed. For 2023, as of 12 September 2023, 499 people have been executed.

=== Religion ===
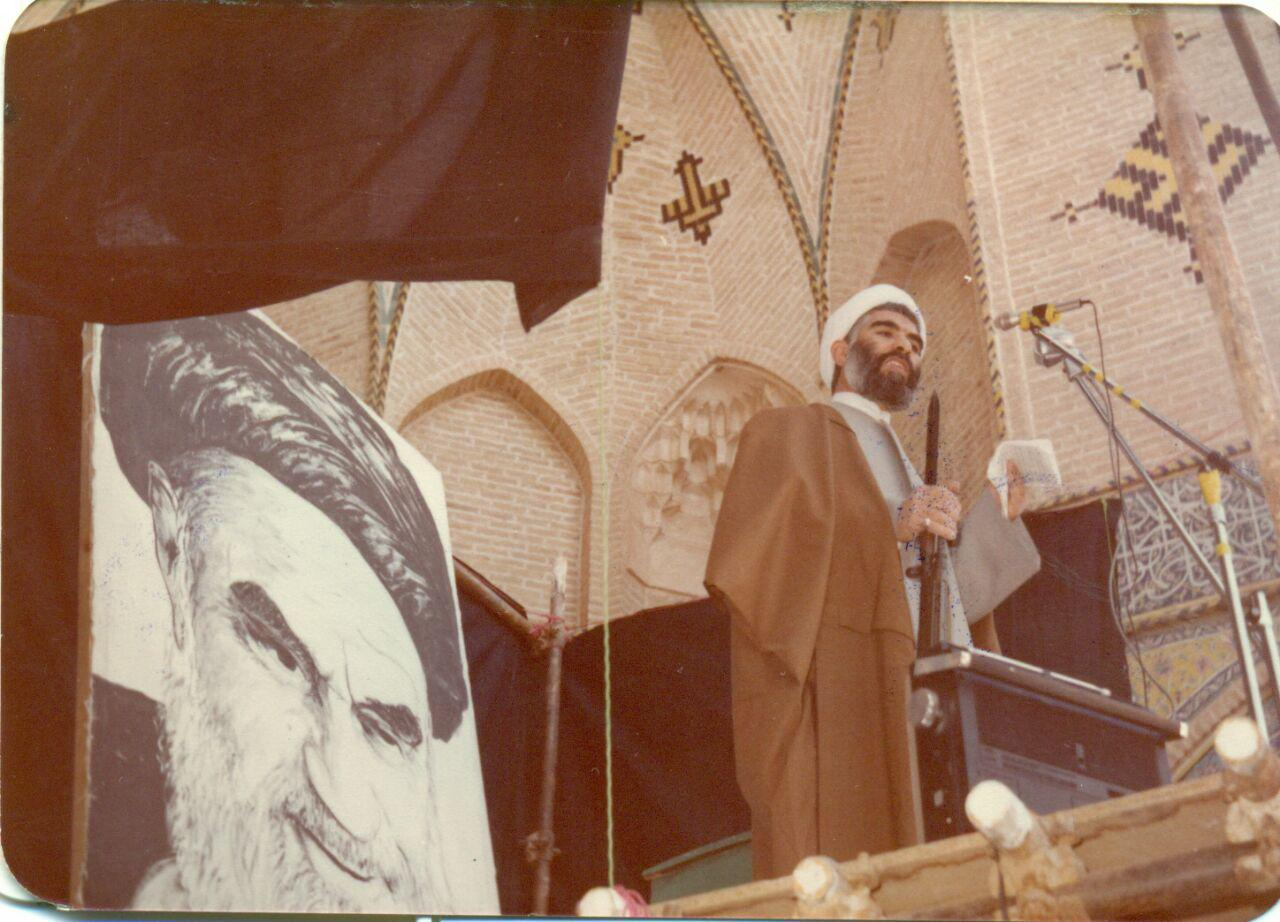
Khamenei's representative, Abbas Ali Akhtari giving a sermon in his first Friday prayer in Semnan, 1981. The Friday prayer plays an important role for the Iranian regime to declare its ideology and intentions.

Iran is governed by Sharia law. It is one of the few Muslim countries where hijab for women is required by law. At the same time, it has "the lowest mosque attendance of any Islamic country", according to Zohreh Soleimani of the BBC. Iranian clergy have complained that more than 70% of the population do not perform their daily prayers and that less than 2% attend Friday mosques.

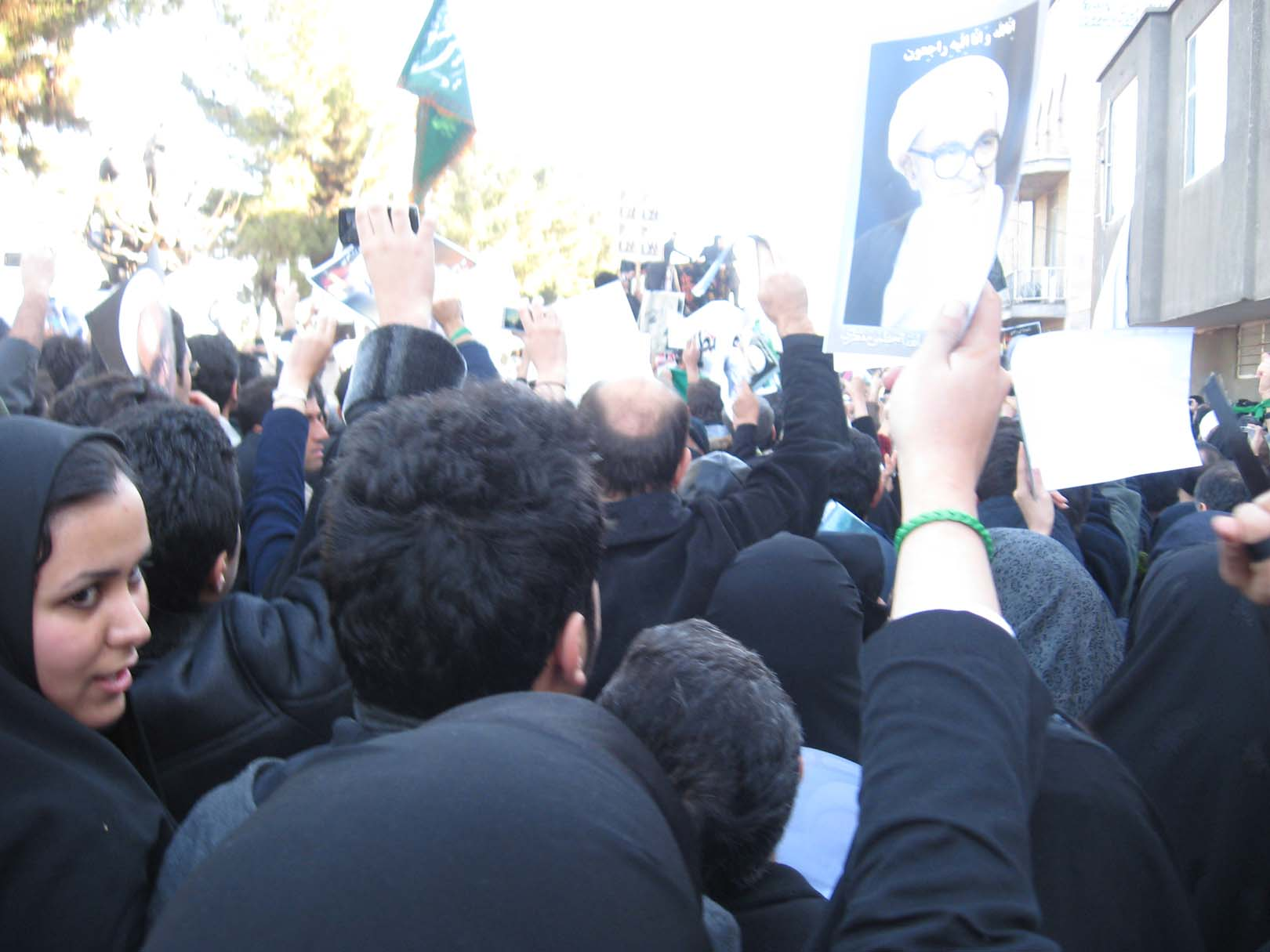
The funeral of Grand Ayatollah Hosein-Ali Montazeri who challenged the regime for several decades.

For religious minorities, life has been mixed under the Islamic Republic. Khomeini also called for unity between Sunni and Shi'a Muslims (Sunni Muslims are the largest religious minority in Iran). Pre-revolutionary statements by Khomeini were antagonistic towards Jews, but shortly after his return from exile in 1979, he issued a fatwa ordering that Jews and other minorities (except Baháʼís) be treated well. Non-Muslim religious minorities do not have equal rights in the Islamic Republic (For example, senior government posts are reserved for Muslims and Jewish, Christian and Zoroastrian schools must be run by Muslim principals) but four of the 270 seats in parliament are reserved for three non-Islamic minority religions.

The 300,000 members of the Baháʼí Faith, are actively harassed. "Some 200 of whom have been executed and the rest forced to convert or subjected to the most horrendous disabilities." Starting in late 1979 the new government systematically targeted the leadership of the Baháʼí community by focusing on the Baháʼí leadership.

=== Natural disasters ===
The 6.6 M_{w} Bam earthquake shook southeastern Iran with a maximum Mercalli intensity of IX (Violent), leaving more than 26,000 dead and 30,000 injured. The 7.4 M_{w} Manjil–Rudbar earthquake struck northern Iran with a maximum Mercalli intensity of X (Extreme), killing 35,000–50,000, and injuring 60,000–105,000.

=== Scientific development ===
Iran's scientific progress is subject to many problems including funding, international sanctions, and management. However, in some areas such as medicine, surgery, pharmacology, stem cell research and theoretical physics (e.g., string theory), Iranian scientists have found international reputation since the Iranian revolution. Nuclear technology and stem cell research were the two fields that have enjoyed special support from the central government and Iranian leadership since the revolution.

In 2005 Iran's national science budget was less than $1 billion and had not been subject to any significant increase since 15 years ago. But according to Science-Metrix, since 1990 Iran's scientific production has had a rapid buildup, and Iran currently has the fastest growth rate in science and technology worldwide.

Iran is among the international leaders of stem cell technology and was the 10th country to produce embryonic human stem cells, although in terms of articles per capita basis, it reportedly ranked 15th in the world.

== Khomeini's reign ==
Ayatollah Khomeini was the ruler of (or at least dominant figure in) Iran for a decade, from the founding of the Islamic Republic in April 1979 until his death in mid-1989. During that time the revolution was being consolidated as a theocratic republic under Khomeini, and Iran was fighting a costly and bloody war with Iraq.

=== Islamic Revolution ===
The Islamic Republic of Iran began with the Iranian Revolution. The first major demonstrations to overthrow Shah Mohammad Reza Pahlavi began in January 1978. The new theocratic Constitution—whereby Khomeini became Supreme Leader of the country—was approved in December 1979. In between, the Shah fled Iran in January 1979 after strikes and demonstrations paralyzed the country, and on February 1, 1979, Ayatollah Khomeini returned to Tehran to a greeting by several million Iranians. The final collapse of the Pahlavi dynasty occurred shortly after on February 11 when Iran's military declared itself "neutral" after guerrillas and rebel troops overwhelmed troops loyal to the Shah in armed street fighting. Iran officially became the Islamic Republic on April 1, 1979

==== Initial international impact ====
The initial impact of the Islamic revolution around the world was tremendous. In the non-Muslim world it has changed the image of Islam, generating much interest in the politics and spirituality of Islam, along with "fear and distrust towards Islam" and particularly the Islamic Republic and its founder. In the Mideast and Muslim world, particularly in its early years, it triggered enormous enthusiasm and redoubled opposition to western intervention and influence. Islamist insurgents rose in Saudi Arabia (the 1979 week-long takeover of the Grand Mosque), Egypt (the 1981 machine-gunning of the Egyptian President Sadat), Syria (the Muslim Brotherhood rebellion in Hama), and Lebanon (the 1983 bombing of the American Embassy and French and American peace-keeping troops).

=== Consolidation of the Revolution ===
Instability in Iran did not end with the creation of the Islamic Republic and remained high for a few years. The country's economy and apparatus of government had collapsed. Military and security forces were in disarray. But by 1982 (or 1983) Khomeini and his supporters had crushed the rival factions and consolidated power.

==== Constitution ====
The first draft of the constitution for the Islamic Republic contained a conventional president and parliament but its only theocratic element was a Guardian Council to veto unIslamic legislation. However, in the summer of 1979 an Assembly of Experts for Constitution, dominated by Khomeini supporters, was elected. Their new draft gave the guardians much more power and added a powerful post of guardian jurist ruler intended for Khomeini. The new constitution was opposed by non-theocratic groups, both secular and Islamic, and set for approval by referendum in December 1979.

==== Hostage crisis ====
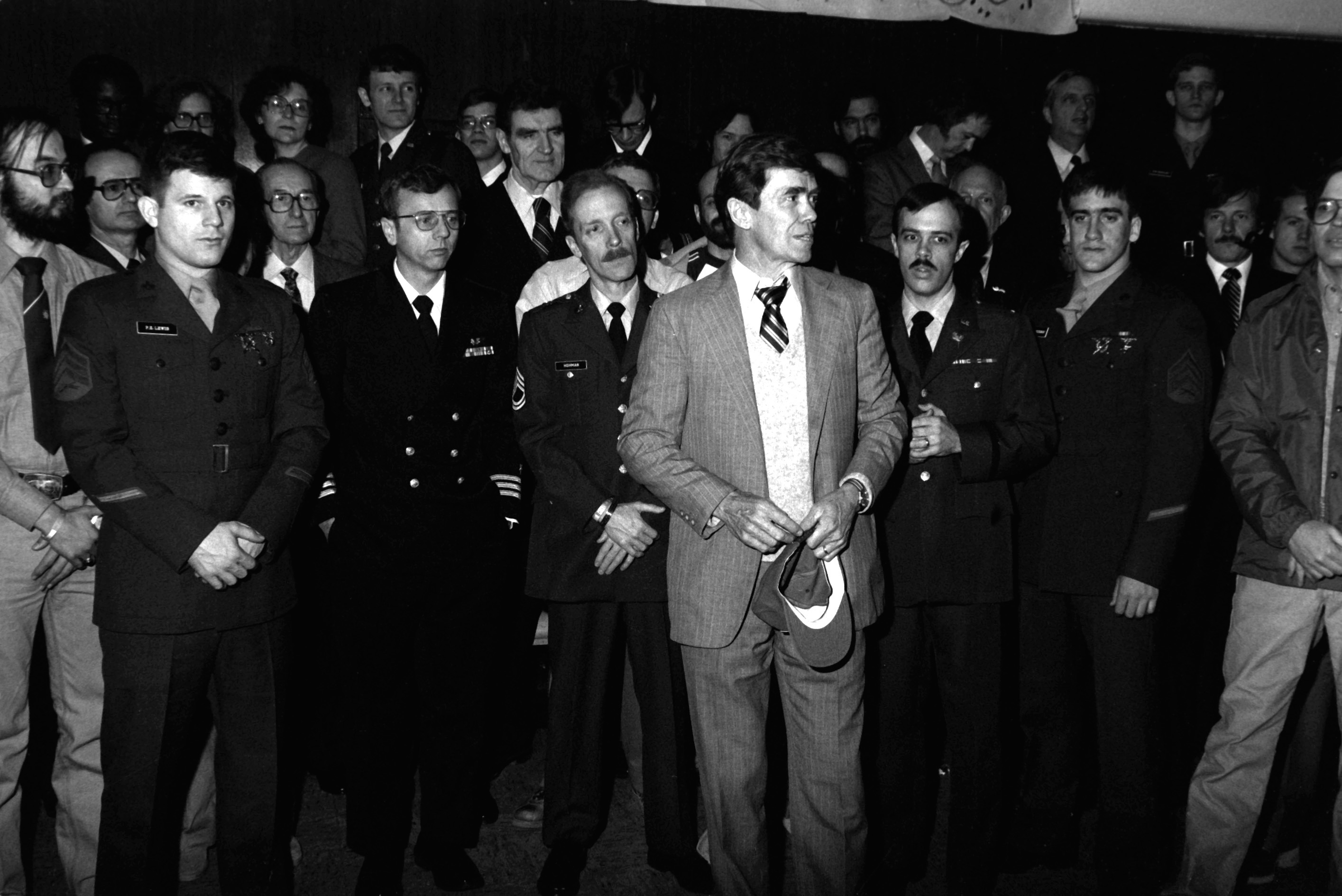
US hostages were released after 444 days of detention in Tehran.

An event that helped pass the constitution, radicalize the revolution and strengthen its anti-American stance, was the Iran hostage crisis. On November 4, 1979, Iranian students seized the U.S. embassy in Tehran holding 52 embassy employees hostage for 444 days. The Carter administration severed diplomatic relations and imposed economic sanctions on April 7, 1980, and later that month unsuccessfully attempted a rescue that further enhanced Khomeini's prestige in Iran. On May 24 the International Court of Justice called for the hostages to be released. Finally, the hostages were released 20 January 1981, by agreement of the Carter Administration, see Algiers Accords Jan. 19, 1981. The crisis also marked the beginning of American legal action, or sanctions, that economically separated Iran from America. Sanctions blocked all property within US jurisdiction owned by the Central Bank and Government of Iran.

==== Suppression of opposition ====
Revolutionary factions disagreed on the shape of the new Iran. Those who thought the Shah would be replaced by a democratic government soon found Khomeini disagreed. In early March 1979, he announced, "do not use this term, 'democratic.' That is the Western style."

In succession the National Democratic Front was banned in August 1979, the provisional government was disempowered in November, the Muslim People's Republican Party banned in January 1980, the People's Mujahedin of Iran (MEK) and its supporters came under attack between 1979 and 1981, a purge of universities was begun in March 1980, and leftist President Abolhassan Banisadr was impeached in June 1981.

==== Armed resistance ====
On 20 June, the MEK urged the populace to mobilize and demonstrate against authoritarian rule. This constituted the most explicit confrontation with Khomeini since the revolution and represented a clear attempt to destabilize the religious establishment. The authorities responded promptly and with considerable violence, deploying Revolutionary Guards to suppress the demonstrations by any means necessary. Armed Hezbollah groups, equipped with chains and clubs, dispersed the gatherings. On 21 June, the Majles voted 177 to 1 in favor of impeaching the president, and the following day Khomeini formally dismissed him from office. The ouster of President Banisadr did not put an immediate end to the opposition but moved it to armed resistance against the new government. Thousands of MEK supporters and members were killed from 1979 to 1981, and some 3,000 were arrested, but unlike other opposition groups driven underground by the regime, the MEK was able to retaliate.

Evidence suggests that the leaders of the Islamic Republican Party (IRP), who had never attained the level of popular support enjoyed by Bani Sadr, were sufficiently concerned by the challenge that they responded with disproportionate severity. The extensive executions and killings of protesters ultimately proved counterproductive, generating a renewed wave of public sympathy for the MEK.

On 28 June 1981, bombs were detonated at the headquarters of the since-dissolved Islamic Republic Party. Around 70 high-ranking officials, including Chief Justice Mohammad Beheshti (who was the second most powerful figure in the revolution after Ayatollah Khomeini at the time), cabinet members, and members of parliament, were killed. Responsibility for the bombing was never definitively determined. Initial official statements attributed blame to former SAVAK operatives and to the MEK. In his first public response, Khomeini made his own position unambiguous, declaring that the incident had been perpetrated by agents of the United States and the MEK. The MEK never publicly confirmed or denied any responsibility, but only stated the attack was "a natural and necessary reaction to the regime's atrocities."

Executions of opposition figures in prison, initiated after the 20 June demonstration with the sudden removal and execution of Said Soltanpur, an outspoken poet and writer, were intensified in the following period. The MEK retaliated accordingly, and in the subsequent weeks numerous senior officials and clerics in Tehran and other major cities were wounded or assassinated. On August 30, 1981 another bomb was detonated, killing President Rajai and Premier Mohammad Javad Bahonar. Secretary of National Council and a member of the MEK, Mas'ud Kashmiri, was announced as the perpetrator, and according to regime reports came close to killing the entire government including Khomeini. The reaction following both bombings was intense with thousands of arrests and hundreds of executions of MEK and other leftist groups. The assassinations of prominent officials and regime supporters carried out by the MEK persisted over the following one to two years. The violence assumed a reciprocal character: assassinations served as reprisals for executions, which in turn provoked further waves of retribution within the prisons. Many regime figures were killed, while the number of executions targeting MEK members and leftist opponents escalated into the several thousands.

=== Iran–Iraq War ===
The eight-year-long Iran–Iraq War (September 1980 – August 1988, known as The Imposed War in Iran) is considered the important international event for the first decade of the Islamic Republic, but cost many lives and a great deal of money.

Shortly after the Iranian revolution, Ruhollah Khomeini began calling for Islamic revolutions across the Muslim world, including Iran's Arab neighbor Iraq, the one large state besides Iran in the Gulf with a Shia Muslim majority population. The leadership in Tehran believed that they would launch a massive Shiite uprising across the Middle East and after Iraq's defeat, march on Israel and destroy it.

The war began with Iraq's invasion of Iran, in an attempt by Saddam Hussein to take advantage of the perceived post-revolutionary military weakness in Iran and the Revolution's unpopularity with Western governments. Much of the top leadership of Iran's once-strong Iranian military had been executed. Saddam sought to expand Iraq's access to the Persian Gulf and the oil reserves in Khuzestan (which also only has a substantial Arab population), and to undermine Iranian Islamic revolutionary attempts to incite the Shi'a majority of his country. Iranian officials also believe Saddam invaded with the encouragement of the United States, Saudi Arabia and other countries.

A combination of fierce resistance by Iranians and military incompetence by Iraqi forces soon stalled the Iraqi advance and by early 1982 Iran regained almost all the territory lost to the invasion. The invasion rallied Iranians behind the new regime, enhancing Khomeini's stature and allowed him to consolidate and stabilize his leadership. After this reversal, Khomeini refused an Iraqi offer of a truce, declaring "the regime in Baghdad must fall and must be replaced by the Islamic Republic".

The war continued for another six years under the slogans "War, War until Victory", and "The Road to Jerusalem Goes through Karbala", but other countries, particularly the Soviet Union gave crucial aid to Iraq. The Iraqis also used chemical weapons against Iranian soldiers. As the costs mounted and Iranian morale waned, Khomeini finally accepted a truce called for by UN Security Council Resolution 598. By 1988, Iran was nearly bankrupted by the war, and its supply of soldiers was worn out. The Iranian Army, in desperation, began deploying boys as young as 14 in mass attacks against Iraqi forces. Khomeini remarked that agreeing to peace with Iraq was "like drinking poison", but there was no other choice.

Although Tehran's military achievements by early 1986 were "unimpressive", the regime derived considerable socio-political benefit from the conflict. As Akbar Hashemi Rafsanjani observed, "We have been able to use the war to awaken the people and to fight the problems that threaten the revolution." An estimated 200,000 Iranians were killed and the war is estimated to have cost Iran $627 billion in total direct and indirect charges (in 1990 dollars). By the end of the war neither borders nor regimes were changed.

=== Early laws of the Islamic Republic ===
The new regime undid the Shah's old Family Protection Law, lowering the marriage age for girls back to nine and allowed husbands to divorce wives with the Triple talaq, without court permission. It purged women from the judiciary and secular teachers from the educational system. It removed Baháʼís from government positions, closed down Baháʼí Centers, and arrested and even executed their leaders. A strict "Islamic code of public appearance" was enforced—men were discouraged from wearing ties, women were obliged to wear either scarf and long coats or preferably the full chador.

=== Economy ===
Iran's economy suffered during the first decade following the revolution. Its currency, the rial, fell from 7 to the dollar before the revolution, to 1749 to the dollar in 1989. The revolution also is said to have put an end to the influence of "the notables", and created a very large public sector of the economy, when the government "nationalizing their enterprises in order to keep their employees working ... the state ended up with more than 2000 factories many of them operating in the red".

=== Human rights ===
As of 2022 the authorities continued to heavily suppress the rights to freedom of expression, association and assembly. They banned independent political parties, trade unions and civil society organizations, censored media and jammed satellite television channels. In January, the authorities added Signal to the list of blocked social media platforms, which included Facebook, Telegram, Twitter and YouTube. Security and intelligence officials carried out arbitrary arrests for social media postings deemed “counter-revolutionary” or “un-Islamic”. The authorities imposed internet shutdowns during protests, hiding the scale of violations by security forces. In July, parliament fast-tracked preparations for a bill that were adopted this year, and which would criminalize the production and distribution of censorship circumvention tools and intensify surveillance. Several thousand men, women and children were interrogated, unfairly prosecuted and/or arbitrarily detained solely for peacefully exercising their rights to freedom of expression, association and assembly. Among them were protesters, journalists, dissidents, artists, writers, teachers and dual nationals. Also among them were human rights defenders, including lawyers; women's rights defenders; defenders of LGBTI people's rights, labour rights and minority rights; environmentalists; anti-death penalty campaigners; and bereaved relatives demanding accountability, including for mass executions and enforced disappearances in the 1980s. Hundreds remained unjustly imprisoned at the end of the year.

== Rafsanjani administration ==
=== Ideological changes by fatwa and constitution ===
Two major changes in the ideological underpinnings of the Islamic Republic occurred toward the end of Khomeini's reign. In January 1988, he issued an edict declaring that the Islamic "Government is among the most important divine injunctions and has priority over all peripheral divine orders ... even prayers, fasting and the Hajj." In April of the next year he decreed a task force to revise the country's constitution to separate the post of Supreme Leader of Iran from that of Shia marja, (the "highest source of religious emulation"), since he found none of Marja to be suitable successors as none had given strong support for his policies. The amendments were drafted and approved by the public about one month after Khomeini's death (1989 July 9). They paved the way for Ali Khamenei – a long time lieutenant of Khomeini, but a relatively low ranking cleric – to be Khomeini's successor as Supreme Leader, but to critics they undermined the "intellectual foundations" of the Islamic Republic theocracy, breaking "the charismatic bond between leader and followers".

=== Political struggle ===
The first post-war decade in Iran has been described as a time of pragmatism, and an "economy-first" policy. According to Shirin Ebadi, "about two years into the postwar period, the Islamic Republic quietly changed course. ... It was fairly clear by then that the Shia revolution would not be sweeping the region."

Akbar Hashemi Rafsanjani was elected president shortly after Khomeini's death, and has been described as less revolutionary and "isolationist" than his rivals—"economically liberal, politically authoritarian, and philosophically traditional". (He served from August 17, 1989, to August 1997.) While Leader Khamenei and the Council of Guardians generally supported these policies, in the parliament radical deputies initially had control, outnumbered Rafsanjani's "pragmatic-conservative camp" 90 to 160.

The two groups differed strongly over economic and foreign policy, with radicals tending to support mass political participation and state control of the economy, and oppose normalization of relations with the West. Conservatives used the power to disqualify candidates from running for office to deal with this problem. "The Council of Guardians disqualified nearly all radical candidates from the fall 1990 Assembly of Experts elections because they had failed to pass written and oral tests in Islamic jurisprudence." In the winter and spring of 1992 nearly one-third of the 3150 candidates for the 1992 election for the parliament were rejected, including 39 incumbents. Leading radicals such as Khalkhali, Nabvi, Bayat, and Hajjat al-Islam Hadi Ghaffari were sent packing because they lacked the "proper Islamic credentials".

In late 1992 Minister of Culture and Islamic Guidance Seyed Mohammad Khatami and director of the Voice and Vision Broadcasting company Mohammad Hashemi Rafsanjani (brother of the president) were both forced out. By 1994 "hundreds of intellectuals and supposed dissidents were in prison and some had been executed". These purges cleared the regime of opponents but are thought to have set the stage for the reform movement, as exiled radicals warmed to the "liberal" values of freedom of speech, assembly, due process, etc.

=== Persian Gulf War ===
Iraq invaded and overran Kuwait on August 2, 1990, causing a multinational coalition of UN forces to be assembled in response. Although Iran criticized the invasion and supported sanctions against its neighbor, it refused any active participation in the war, not surprising given the country's anti-Western attitudes and state of exhaustion from the recent conflict with its neighbor. As a result of the war and its aftermath, more than one million Kurds crossed the Iraqi border into Iran as refugees.

=== Economy ===
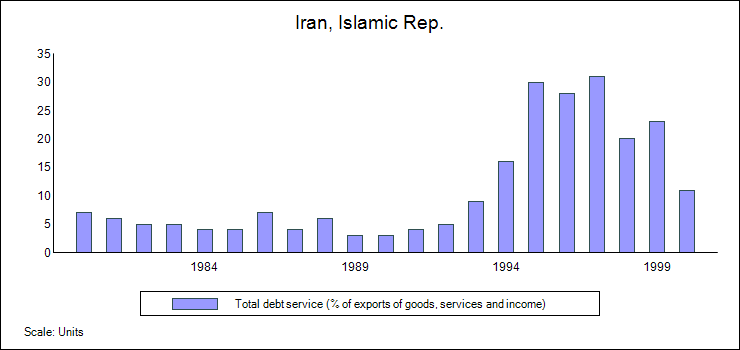
Iran's total debt service as percent of exports of goods services and income increased sixfold between 1990 and 1997.

Despite the "economy first" focus, Iran suffered serious economic problems during the Rafsanjani era. According to economist Bijan Khajehpour, economic growth in Iran between 1989 and 1994 was "mainly financed through the accumulation of some $30 billion in foreign debt. In 1993, the ratio of Iran's foreign debt to the country's GDP reached 38%, which was alarming." A lack of foreign investment along with a fall in oil prices from $20 to $12 per barrel added to this external debt, and triggered an economic recession. The Iranian rial plummeted from 1,749 to 6,400 to the dollar in 1995. Unemployment reached 30%. The price of sugar, rice, and butter rose threefold, and that of bread sixfold.

In part this economic downturn came from American economic sanctions leveled in 1996, when America suspended all trade with Iran, accusing Iran of supporting terrorist groups and attempting to develop nuclear weapons. The sanctions, in turn, may be traceable to the earlier hostage crisis and the enmity of the US government which continued to see Iran as a major regional threat both to America and Israel.

=== Birth control ===
A new policy regarded as a success of the new government was its promotion of birth control. In 1989, the government, "having previously encouraged population growth, reversed gears and declared that Islam favored families with only two children". Birth control clinics were opened, especially for women. Condoms and pills were distributed. Subsidies to large families were cut. Sex education was introduced into the school curriculum, mandatory classes for newlyweds were held.)

== Khatami administration ==
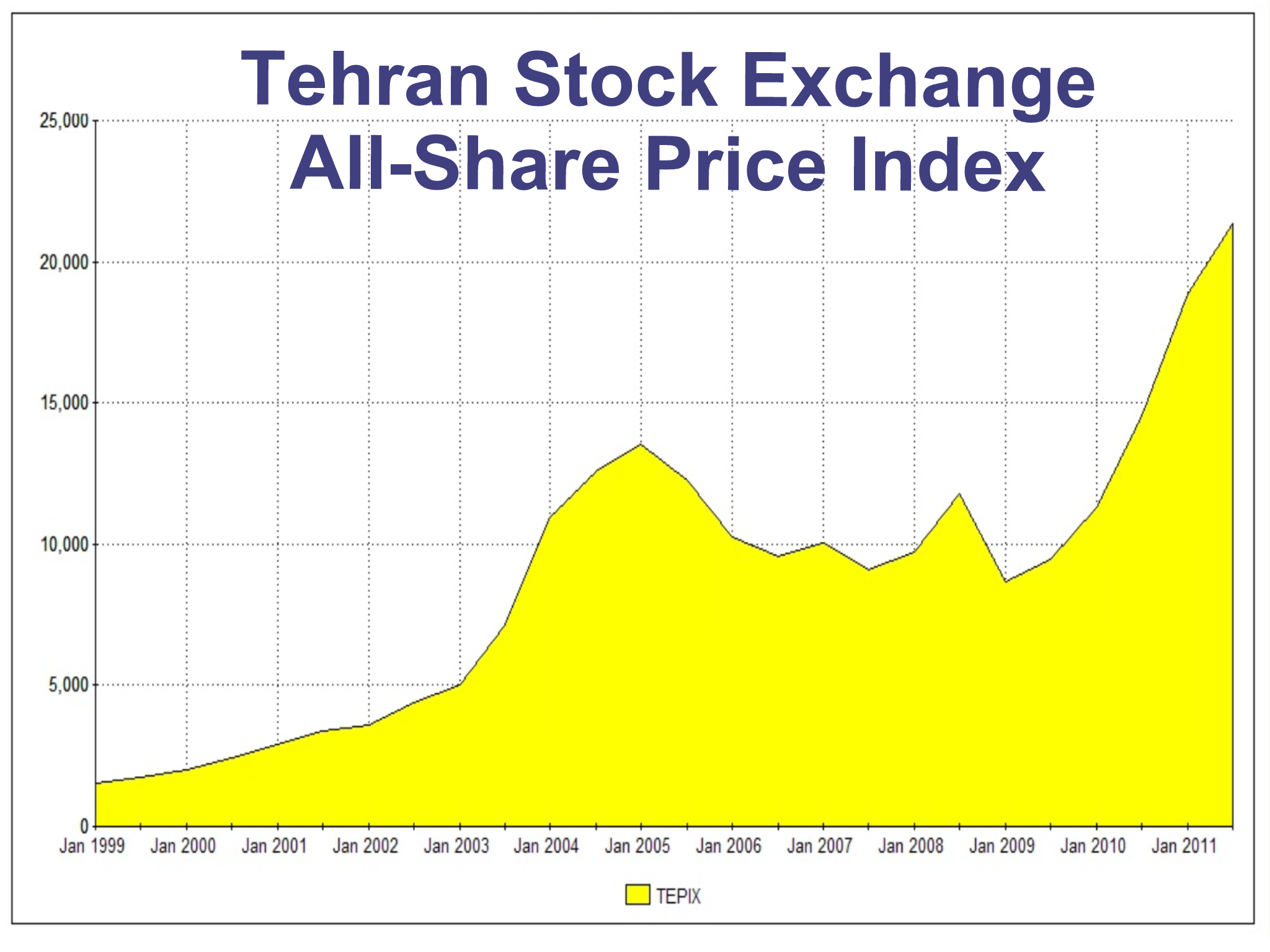
Between March 2001 and April 2003, the TSE index (Topix) bucked the trend by going up nearly 80%.

The eight years of Mohammad Khatami's two terms as president in 1997–2005 are sometimes called Iran's Reform Era.

Khatami based his campaign on a reform program promising a more democratic and tolerant society, promotion of civil society, the rule of law and improvement of social rights. This included city council elections, adherence to Iran's constitution, freedom to criticize high ranking authorities – including the supreme leader, permission to operate newspapers of a wide range of political views, reopening the embassies of all European countries, reorganizing the Ministry of Intelligence of Iran after the Iran's chain murders of intellectuals, initiating a dialogue between people of different faith inside and outside Iran, also called "Dialogue Among Civilizations".

Iran's large youth demographic (by 1995, about half of the country's 60.5 million people had not been born after the Islamic Revolution) is one of Khatami's bases of support.

=== Political and cultural changes ===
At first, the new era saw significant liberalization. The number of daily newspapers published in Iran increased from five to twenty-six. Journal and book publishing also soared. Iran's film industry boomed under the Khatami regime and Iranian films won prizes at Cannes, and Venice. Local elections promised in the Islamic Republic's constitution but delayed for over a decade were held for towns, villages, and hamlets and the number of elected officials in Iran increased from 400 to almost 200,000.

=== Conservative reaction ===
After taking office, Khatami faced fierce opposition from his powerful opponents within the unelected institutions of the state which he had no legal power over, and this led to repeated clashes between his government and these institutions (including the Guardian Council, the state radio, and television, the police, the armed forces, the judiciary, the prisons, etc.).

In 1999, new curbs were put on the press. Courts banned more than 60 newspapers. Important allies of President Khatami were arrested, tried and imprisoned on what outside observers considered "trumped up" or ideological grounds. Tehran mayor, Gholamhossein Karbaschi was tried on corruption charges and Interior Minister Abdollah Nouri for "sacrilege"—despite their credentials as activists in the Islamic revolution. In 2002 history professor and reformist activist Hashem Aghajari was sentenced to death for apostasy for calling for "Islamic Protestantism" and reform in Islam.

In July 1999 conservatives closed the reformist newspaper, Salam, and attacked a Tehran University student dormitory after students protested the closing. Prodemocracy student demonstrations erupted at Tehran University and other urban campuses. These were followed by a wave of counter-demonstrations by conservative factions.

Reformers won a substantial victory in Feb. 2000, parliamentary elections, capturing about two-thirds of the seats, but conservative elements in the government forced the closure of the reformist press. Attempts by parliament to repeal restrictive press laws were forbidden by Supreme Leader Ali Khamenei. Despite these conditions, President Khatami was overwhelming re-elected in June 2001. Tensions between reformers in parliament and conservatives in the judiciary and the Guardian Council, over both social and economic changes, increased after Khatami's reelection.

=== Foreign policy ===
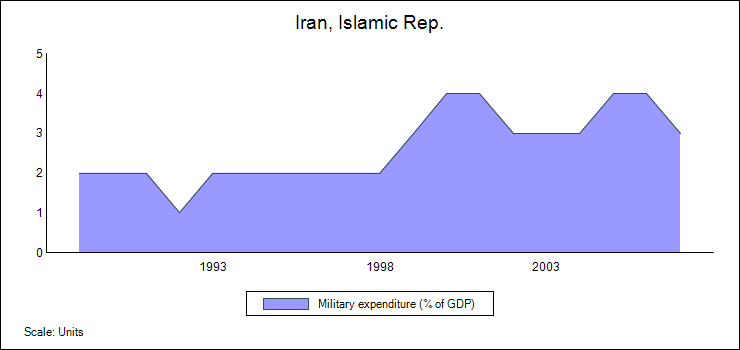
Military expenditures (% GDP)

Khatami worked to improve relations with other countries visiting many other countries and holding a dialogue between civilizations and encouraged foreigners to invest in Iran. He announced Iran would accept a two-state solution for Palestine if Palestinians agreed to one, relaxed restrictions on the Baháʼí, and assured Britain Iran would not implement the fatwa against Salman Rushdie. Several European Union countries began renewing economic ties with Iran in the late 1990s, and trade and investment increased. In 1998, Britain re-established diplomatic relations with Iran, broken since the 1979 revolution. The United States loosened its economic embargo, but it continued to block more normalized relations, arguing that the country had been implicated in international terrorism and was developing a nuclear weapons capacity. In his State of the Union Address, United States President George W. Bush labeled Iran, along with Iraq and North Korea, as an "axis of evil".

Tensions with the United States increased after the Anglo-American invasion of Iraq in March 2003, as U.S. officials increasingly denounced Iran for pursuing the alleged development of nuclear weapons.

The reform era ended with the conservatives defeat of Iranian reformists in the elections of 2003, 2004 and 2005—the local, parliamentary, and presidential elections. According to at least one observer, the reformists were defeated not so much by a growth of support for conservative Islamist policies as by division within the reformist movement and the banning of many reform candidates which discouraged pro-reform voters from voting.

== Ahmadinejad's administration ==
Mahmoud Ahmadinejad was elected to the presidency twice, in 2005 and 2009. Ahmadinejad ran for office as a conservative populist pledging to fight corruption, defend the interests of the poor, and strengthen Iran's national security. In 2005 he defeated former president Rafsanjani by a wide margin in the runoff, his victory credited to the popularity of his economic promises and a very low reformist voter turnout compared to the 1997 and 2001 elections. This victory gave conservatives control of all branches of Iran's government.

His administration has been marked by controversy over his outspoken pronouncements against American "arrogance" and "imperialism", and description of the state of Israel as a "fabricated entity ... doomed to go", and over high unemployment and inflation opponents blamed on his populist economic policies of cheap loans for small businesses, and generous subsidies on petrol and food.

In 2009 Ahmadinejad's victory was hotly disputed and marred by large protests that formed the "greatest domestic challenge" to the leadership of the Islamic Republic "in 30 years", as well as clashes with parliament. Despite high turnout and large enthusiastic crowds for reformist opponent Mir-Hossein Mousavi, Ahmadinejad was officially declared to have won by a 2–1 margin against three opponents. Allegations of voting irregularities and protest by Mousavi and his supporters were immediate and continued off and on into 2011. Some 36–72 were killed and 4000 arrested. Supreme Leader Ali Khamenei declared Ahmadinejad's victory a "divine assessment" and called for unity. He and others Islamic officials blamed foreign powers for fomenting the protest.

However, by late 2010 several sources detected a "growing rift" between Ahmadinejad, and Khamenei and his supporters, with talk of impeachment of Ahmadinejad. The dispute centered on Esfandiar Rahim Mashaei, a top adviser and close confidant of Ahmadinejad, and accused leader of a "deviant current" opposing greater involvement of clerics in politics.

=== Foreign relations ===
Although functions such as the appointment of the commanders of the armed forces and the members of national security councils are handled by the supreme leader and not by Iran's president, Ahmadinejad gained considerable international attention for his foreign policy. Under Ahmadinejad, Iran's strong ties with the Republic of Syria and Hezbollah of Lebanon continued, and new relationships with predominantly Shia neighbor Iraq and fellow opponent of U.S. foreign policy Hugo Chavez of Venezuela were developed.

Ahmadinejad's outspoken pronouncements in foreign affairs included personal letters to a number of world leaders including one to American president George W. Bush inviting him to "monotheism and justice", an open letter to the American people, the declaration that there were no homosexuals in Iran, and an expression of happiness at the 2008 financial crisis which would "put an end to liberal economy".

Hezbollah's dependence on Iran for military and financial aid is not universally supported in Iran. The 2006 Israel–Hezbollah War exposed the world to a number of weapons in Hezbollah possession said to be Iranian imports.

==== Controversy concerning remarks about Israel ====
President Mahmoud Ahmedinejad also made several controversial statements about the Holocaust and Israel, and was quoted in foreign media sources as saying "Israel should be wiped off the map." Iran's foreign minister denied that Tehran wanted to see Israel "wiped off the map", saying "Ahmadinejad had been misunderstood." It was asserted that the correct translation of Ahmadinejad's remark was, "the regime currently occupying Jerusalem will be erased from the pages of time". Reviewing the controversy over the translation, New York Times deputy foreign editor Ethan Bronner observed that "all official translations" of the comments, including the foreign ministry and president's office, "refer to wiping Israel away". His comments were strongly criticized by a number of foreign leaders.

Iran's stated policy on Israel is to urge a one-state solution through a countrywide referendum in which a government would be elected that all Palestinians and all Israelis would jointly vote for; which would normally be an end to the "Zionist state". Iran's supreme leader Ayatollah Khamenei, rejecting any attack on Israel, called for a referendum in Palestine. Ahmadinejad himself has also repeatedly called for such solution. Moreover, Khamenei's main advisor in foreign policy, Ali Akbar Velayati, said that Holocaust was a genocide and a historical reality. Mahmoud Ahmadinejad and other prominent officials have however on other occasion called for the destruction of Israel.

==== Controversy about Iran's nuclear program ====
After, in August 2005, Iran resumed converting raw uranium into gas, a necessary step for enrichment, the IAEA passed a resolution that accused Iran of failing to comply with the Nuclear Nonproliferation Treaty and called for the agency to report Iran to the UN Security Council. The timetable for the reporting, however, was left undetermined. Iran's stated position is that it is in full compliance with the Nuclear Nonproliferation Treaty, that it has allowed the IAEA inspections beyond what is required, and that it has no ambitions to build atomic weapons.

In February 2004, elections, conservatives won control of parliament, securing some two-thirds of the seats. Many Iranians, however, were unhappy with the failure of the current parliament to achieve any significant reforms or diminish the influence of the hardliners. In mid-2004 Iran began resuming the processing of nuclear fuel as part of its plan to achieve self-sufficiency in civilian nuclear power production, stating that the negotiations with European Union nations had failed to bring access to the advanced nuclear technology that was promised. The action was denounced by the United States as one which would give Iran the capability to develop nuclear weapons. The IAEA said that there was no evidence that Iran was seeking to develop such arms. However, the IAEA also called for Iran to abandon its plans to produce enriched uranium. In November 2004, Iran agreed to suspend uranium enrichment but subsequently indicated that it would not be held to the suspension if the negotiations the EU nations failed.

During an October 2013 meeting, however, Iran agreed, in negotiations with several Western European nations, to toughen international inspections of its nuclear installations. Nonetheless, the international community continued to express concerns over Iran's nuclear program. At least five Iranian nuclear scientists during 2010 and 2011 had been killed, by unknown attackers.

=== Economy ===
Ahmadinejad's populist economic policies of cheap loans for small businesses, and generous subsidies on petrol and food were helped by soaring petroleum export revenues until the Great Recession.

==== Corruption ====
President Ahmadinejad has vouched to fight "economic Mafia" at all echelons of government. President Ahmadinejad has also proposed that lawmakers consider a bill, based on which the wealth and property of all officials who have held high governmental posts since 1979 could be investigated.

According to Farda newspaper, the difference between President Ahmadinejad administration's revenues and the amount deposited with the Central Bank of Iran exceeds $66 billion. This is a large number as it is equal one-tenth of Iran's total oil revenues since the 1979 revolution. This amount is broken down as follows:

- $35 billion in imported goods (2005–2009),
- $25 billion in oil revenues (2005–2008),
- $2.6 billion in non-oil export revenues,
- $3 billion in foreign exchange reserves.

Vice President for Executive Affairs Ali Saeedlou said in 2008 that "mafia groups" in Iran are trying to divert public opinion away from the government's determination to fight economic corruption by creating impediments, spreading rumors and promoting despair in the society.

In 2010, more than 230 lawmakers in a letter to Judiciary Chief Ayatollah Sadeq Larijani said it is the duty of his organization to start from the top echelons of power in the drive against corruption. The letter added,

It is the duty of the judiciary to start from higher echelons of power in this challenging but sacred drive. It does not make a difference whether the suspect is a high-ranking official or kith and kin of the officialdom. The legislators assure the people that they will endorse this Jihad of the judiciary alongside the Leader and people.

==== Controversies over economic policy ====
In June 2006, 50 Iranian economists wrote a letter to Ahmadinejad that criticized his price interventions to stabilize prices of goods, cement, government services, and his decree issued by the High Labor Council and the Ministry of Labor that proposed an increase of workers' salaries by 40 percent. Ahmadinejad publicly responded harshly to the letter and denounced the accusations.

In July 2007, Ahmadinejad ordered the dissolution of the Management and Planning Organisation of Iran, a relatively independent planning body with a supervisory role in addition to its responsibility to allocate the national budget, and replaced it with a new budget planning body directly under his control, a move that may give him a freer hand to implement populist policies.

In November 2008, a group of 60 Iranian economists condemned Ahmadinejad's economic policies, saying Iran faces deep economic problems, including stunted growth, double-digit inflation, and widespread unemployment, and must drastically change course. It also criticized Ahmadinejad's foreign policy calling it "tension-creating" and saying it has "scared off foreign investment and inflicted heavy damage" on the economy. Ahmadinejad replied that Iran has been least affected by the 2008 financial crisis.

==== 2007 gas rationing plan in Iran ====
In 2007, President Mahmoud Ahmadinejad's cabinet launched the Gas Rationing Plan to reduce the country's fuel consumption. Although Iran is one of the world's largest producers of petroleum, mismanagement, kleptocracy, rapid increases in demand and limited refining capacity has forced the country to import about 40% of its gasoline, at an annual cost of up to $7 billion.

=== Domestic policy ===
==== Human rights ====
According to the group Human Rights Watch, Iran's human rights record "has deteriorated markedly" under the administration of President Mahmoud Ahmadinejad. Beginning in 2005, the number of offenders executed increased from 86 in 2005 to 317 in 2007. Months-long arbitrary detentions of "peaceful activists, journalists, students, and human rights defenders" and often charged with "acting against national security", has intensified.

==== Population, cultural and women's issues ====
In April 2007, the Tehran police began the most fierce crackdown on "bad hijab" in more than a decade. In the capital Tehran thousands of Iranian women were cautioned over their poor Islamic dress and several hundred arrested. In 2011, an estimated 70,000 police in Tehran alone, patrolled for clothing and hair infractions. As of 2011, men are barred from wearing necklaces, “glamorous” hairstyles, ponytails, and shorts. Neckties are forbidden in the holy city of Qom. After a leading cleric (Hojatoleslam Gholamreza Hassani) issued a fatwa against keeping dogs as pets, a crackdown on dog ownership commenced.

Several controversial proposals by President Ahmadinejad and conservatives have not come to fruition. Plans to encourage larger families, to encourage polygamy by permitting it despite the opposition of a husband's first wife; and to put a tax on Mahriyeh—a stipulated sum that a groom agrees to give or owe to his bride which is seen by many women "as a financial safety net in the event a husband leaves the marriage and is not forced to pay alimony"—have not gone anywhere.

=== 2009 election controversy ===
Ahmadinejad's 2009 election victory was hotly disputed and marred by large protests that formed the "greatest domestic challenge" to the leadership of the Islamic Republic "in 30 years". Despite high turnout and large enthusiastic crowds for reformist opponent Mir-Hossein Mousavi, Ahmadinejad was officially declared to have won by a 2–1 margin against three opponents. Allegations of voting irregularities and protest by Mousavi his supporters were immediate and by 1 July 2009 1000 people had been arrested and 20 killed in street demonstrations. Supreme Leader Ali Khamenei and others Islamic officials blamed foreign powers for fomenting the protest. However, according to World Public Opinion (a United States poll), the protest does not mean Iran is in a "pre-revolutionary" situation as a WPO poll of Iranians taken in early September 2009 found high levels of satisfaction with the regime. 80% of the Iranians respondents said President Ahmadinejad was honest, 64% expressed a lot of confidence in him, and nine in ten said they were satisfied with Iran's system of government.

=== Public opinion ===
According to the (U.S.) International Peace Institute's 2010-poll conducted in Persian by a representative sample of the Iranian people:

- Iranians are divided on the government's performance.
- Dissatisfied with the economy.
- Worry over sanctions and isolation.
- Want to focus on domestic affairs.
- Favor closer ties to the West.
- Rising tensions sparked hostility toward the US, Europe, and U.N.
- Favor nuclear arms and do not want to back deals to halt enrichment.
- Independent polls do not contradict official turnout of 2009 election, which gave around 60% of the vote to Ahmadinejad.

== Rouhani administration ==
Hassan Rouhani was elected as President of Iran on 12 June 2013 and took office on 3 August. He is known as a moderate left-leaner, supported by reformists in the election. He has open ideas in the area of economics and a high-level foreign policy, as he served as a diplomat before his election. He has moved quickly to engage in diplomatic negotiations with Western countries, seeking the lifting of crippling economic sanctions on oil exports in exchange for Iran's cooperation with UN treaties regarding the development of nuclear weapons. Economic conditions improved during Rouhani's first term and led to his reelection in 2017 with his reformist agenda. The 2017–18 Iranian protests swept across the country against the government and its longtime supreme leader in response to the economic and political situation. The scale of protests throughout the country and the number of people participating were significant, and it was formally confirmed that thousands of protesters were arrested. The 2019–20 Iranian protests started on 15 November in Ahvaz, spreading across the country within hours, after the government announced increases in the fuel price of up to 300%. A week-long total Internet shutdown throughout the country marked one of the most severe Internet blackouts in any country, and in the bloodiest governmental crackdown of the protestors in the history of Islamic Republic, tens of thousands were arrested and hundreds were killed within a few days according to multiple international observers, including Amnesty International.

On 3 January 2020, the revolutionary guard's general, Qasem Soleimani, was assassinated by the United States in Iraq, which considerably heightened the existing tensions between the two countries. Three days after, Iran's Islamic Revolutionary Guard Corps launched a retaliatory attack on US forces in Iraq and shot down Ukraine International Airlines Flight 752, killing 176 civilians and leading to nation-wide protests. An international investigation led to the government admitting to the shootdown of the plane by a surface-to-air missile after three days of denial, calling it a "human error".

== Raisi administration ==
Ebrahim Raisi was elected as President of Iran on 18 June 2021 and took office on the 8th of August. He is known as a Right-wing politician as his party (the CCA) also is right wing. He wants economic liberation for Iran and sees the sanctions against Iran as a way for economic opportunity, as he was quoted saying "Sanctions should be seen as an opportunity for economic empowerment, and we should strengthen ourselves instead of falling short."

=== Mahsa Amini protests ===
Perhaps the biggest domestic event as of 2023 during the Raisi administration was the arrest and alleged killing of Mahsa Amini on September 16, 2022, and the subsequent protests that followed. Amini, a 22-year-old Iranian woman, was arrested for allegedly wearing her hijab improperly, and died in custody three days later, protesters believe from beating and torture by Guidance Patrol officials.

The protests sparked by her death were "unlike any the country had seen before", the "biggest challenge" to the government, with 10,000s arrested and over 500 killed. By September 2023, the protests had been crushed and authorities were working to crackdown on bareheaded women and restore compulsory hijab.

Raisi's public response towards the Iranian protests caused by the death of Mahsa Amini was to promise to set up a commission to investigate the death of Mahsa Amini, although this did not affect the protests.

=== Spring 2024 ===
On 1 April 2024, Israel's air strike on an Iranian consulate building in the Syrian capital Damascus killed an important senior commander of the Islamic Revolutionary Guards Corps (IRGC), Brig Gen Mohammad Reza Zahedi. In retaliation for the Israeli strike, Iran attacked Israel with over 300 drones and missiles on 13 April. However, the Iranian attack was mainly intercepted either outside Israeli airspace or over the country itself. It was the biggest missile attack in Iranian history, and its first ever direct attack on Israel. It was followed by a retaliatory missile strike by Israel on Isfahan, Iran on 19 April.

On 19 May 2024, Ebrahim Raisi died in a helicopter crash in the country's East Azerbaijan province. First Vice President Mohammad Mokhber was appointed acting president after the death of President Raisi.

== Pezeshkian administration ==
On 28 July 2024, Masoud Pezeshkian was formally endorsed as Iran's new president by Iran's supreme leader, Ayatollah Ali Khamenei. Pezeshkian, a reformist, won in a presidential election runoff on 5 July.

On 31 July 2024, Ismail Haniyeh, political chief of Palestinian political and military organisation Hamas, was assassinated in Iran's capital, Tehran, where he was to attend the inauguration ceremony of Iran's President Masoud Pezeshkian.

On 1 October 2024, Iran launched about 180 ballistic missiles at Israel in retaliation for assassinations of Haniyeh, Hassan Nasrallah and Abbas Nilforoushan. On 27 October, Israel responded to that attack by strikes on a missile defence system in the Iranian region of Isfahan.

In December 2024, the fall of the Assad regime in Syria, a close ally of Iran, was a severe setback for the political influence of Iran in the region.

In early 2025, Iran was enriching substantial quantities of uranium to 60% purity, close to weapons-grade. Analysts warned that such activity exceeded any plausible civilian justification. Beginning in April 2025, Iran and the United States entered negotiations for a new nuclear agreement, but progress stalled as Iran's leaders have refused to stop enriching uranium. In June 2025, IAEA found Iran non-compliant with its nuclear obligations for the first time in two decades. In response, Iran announced the activation of a new enrichment facility and began installing additional advanced centrifuges.

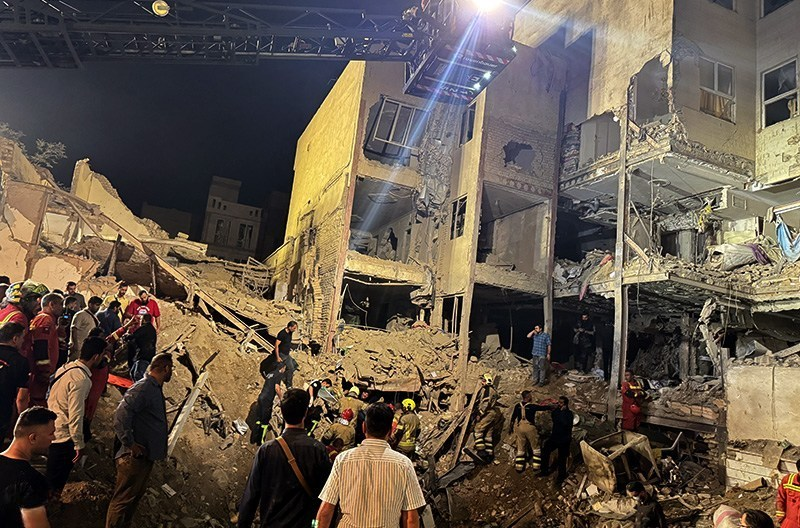
Debris after the Israeli attack in Narmak on 14 June 2025

On 13 June 2025, Israel launched coordinated strikes across Iran, targeting nuclear facilities and high-ranking military leadership and starting the Twelve-Day War. The Natanz enrichment facility was reportedly severely damaged, alongside strikes on the Kermanshah missile base, multiple military installations, and airbases. Explosions were also reported near the Fordow nuclear site. Among the senior commanders killed were: Major General Hossein Salami, head of the Islamic Revolutionary Guard Corps (IRGC); Major General Mohammad Bagheri, chief of staff of Iran's armed forces; and Amir Ali Hajizadeh, commander of the IRGC Air Force and architect of Iran's missile program.

On 22 June 2025, the United States strikes on Iranian nuclear sites targeted three designated locations in Iran: Fordow, Ntanz, and Isfahan. The strikes, which were part of Operation Midnight Hammer, aimed to help dismantle Iran's nuclear weapons program after Iran withdrew from the International Atomic Energy Agency oversight.

Beginning on 28 December 2025, protests erupted across multiple cities in Iran due to the deepening economic crisis. The ensuing crackdown of the unrest, carried out under Ali Khamenei's and senior officials' order for live fire on protesters, resulted in massacres that left tens of thousands of protesters dead, making them the largest massacres in modern Iranian history.

On 28 February 2026, the United States and Israel launched a major attack on Iran with the stated goal of regime change. The attack included the assassination of Supreme Leader Ali Khamenei, whose compound was destroyed, as well as Ali Shamkhani, former head of Iran's Supreme National Security Council, and several other Iranian officials. In retaliation, Iran launched dozens of its drones and ballistic missiles throughout the Persian Gulf in addition to targeting Israel.

== See also ==
- Foreign relations of Iran
- International rankings of Iran
- Islamic fundamentalism in Iran
- Nuclear program of Iran
- COVID-19 pandemic in Iran

== Notes ==
State of Iran
Preceded by Interim Government of Iran	Islamic Republic of Iran; 1979–present	Succeeded by —
