= Farvartish Rezvaniyeh =

Iranian satirist snd video journalist (born 1984)

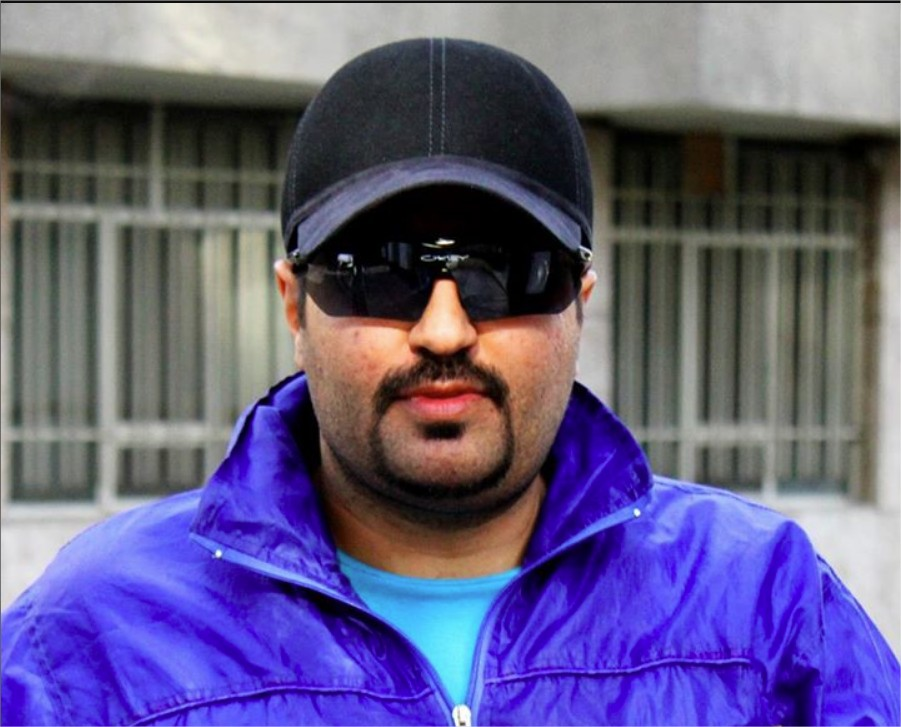
- Farvartish Rezvaniyeh in 2020
- Born: 25 March 1984 (age 42); Tehran, Iran
- Education: Islamic Azad University
- Occupations: Satirist, video journalist

Farvartish Rezvaniyeh (Persian: فَروَرتیش رِضوانیه) (born 25 March 1984, in Tehran, Iran) is an Iranian satirist and video journalist.

== Life ==
Rezvaniyeh has studied music, cinema, and graphic design in various art schools and holds a bachelor's degree in dramatic literature.

He began journalism in his teenage years, and his articles have been published in Iranian newspapers, including Shargh, Ham-Mihan, and Hamshahri. Rezvaniyeh was a member of the editorial board of Gol-Agha Weekly, the most famous satirical magazine in Iran after the 1979 revolution, which worked with the greatest Iranian satirists.

== Works ==
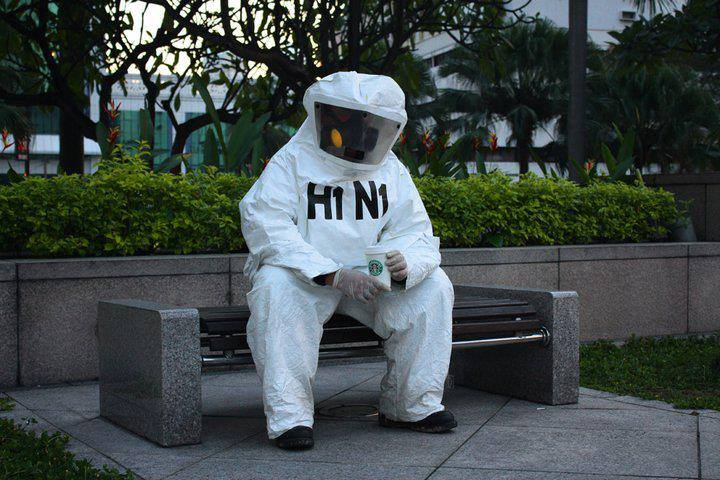
Farvartish Rezvaniyeh with H1N1 anti-pollution clothing to protest the pollution of Tehran.

The action-comedy stories written by Farvartish and published in newspapers have been viral. He has also invented a method, named "Boomerang", in Persian fiction. In this writing style, the main character of the story is the reader, and one can imagine themselves in the settings described by the writer by reading the story.

In 2005, Farvartish published what later became the most well-known April Fool's hoax in the Persian language, which claimed that the Milad communications tower in Tehran had started leaning. Millions of Iranians believed this lie, and even a large number of people gathered at the tower's location to witness its collapse. Also, the price of real estate in the vicinity of the tower fell.

Farvartish has published three books, Boomerang, Sept. 12, and Tehran Dominos.

Tehran Dominos is an action story narrating the circumstances of Tehran after a severe earthquake. An endorsement by Bahram Akasheh, an Iranian seismologist, is written on the book's back cover recommending it to everyone living in Tehran.
