= Tajrobeh =

Iranian magazine

- Editor: Mohammad Ghouchani
- Categories: Literature, cinema, art
- Frequency: monthly
- Founded: 2000
- Country: Iran
- Based in: Tehran
- Language: Persian
- Website: www.tajrobehmag.com

Tajrobeh (Persian: تجربه) is an Iranian monthly magazine published in Tehran. It is a literary and art magazine.

== Overview ==
The first edition of the Tajrobeh was published in Tehran in 2000. It is managed by Katayun Banasaz and its chief editor is Mohammad Ghouchani. It is similar in style and layout to magazines such as Shahrvand-e-Emrooz, Irandokht, Mehrnameh and Nafeh, which have been banned by Iranian judiciary system. The chief editor of these magazines was also Mohammad Ghouchani. The magazine has a reformist stance.

The editorial board of Tajrobeh included journalists, who worked previously in Iranian magazines and newspapers such as Shahrvand-e-Emrooz, Irandokht, Etemadmelli, Nafeh, Mehrnameh and Shargh, which were banned by the Iranian judiciary. Mehdi Yazdanikhorram, Alireza Gholami, Mohsen Azarm, Karim Nikonazar, Parviz Barati are the members of the editorial board. In March 2013 the magazine was banned by the Iranian authorities. It was later relaunched.
