= Nafeh =

Nafeh (Persian: نافه) is an Iranian monthly literary and art magazine, published in Tehran.

== Overview ==
The first edition of Nafeh was published in Tehran in 1998. It is managed by Nahid Tavasoli and its chief editor is Mohammad Ghouchani. It is similar in style and layout to magazines such as Shahrvandemroz and Irandokht, which have been banned by Iranian judiciary system. The chief editor of these magazines was also Mohammad Ghouchani.

The editorial board of Nafeh include journalists, who worked previously in Iranian magazines and newspapers such as Shahrvandemroz, Irandokht, Etemadmelli and Shargh, which were banned by the Iranian judiciary.

== Content ==
Nafeh publishes interviews with authors, poets, artists, directors about their works. Nafeh also publishes critiques of novels, films and the visual arts.

In this magazine has been published interviews with many writers, poets, film directors, composers and singers such as Victor Erofeyev, Ahmad Shamlou, Orhan Pamuk, Günter Grass, Mahmoud Dolatabadi, Abbas Kiarostami, Asghar Farhadi, Kamran Shirdel, Bahman Farmanara, Shahrdad Rohani, Alireza Assar and Mohammad-Reza Lotfi.
