= Hossein Abdoh Tabrizi =

Iranian economist and educator

Secretary General of Tehran Stock Exchange
- In office 2003–2005

Personal details
- Born: September 4, 1951 (age 74) Tehran, Iran
- Education: Allameh Tabatabaei University, Iran Center for Management Studies, Manchester Business School
- Occupation: Economist, educator

Hossein Abdoh Tabrizi (Persian: حسین عبده تبریزی; born September 4, 1951, in Tehran) is an Iranian professor of Finance and a financial practitioner. Since 2013, he is an Honorary Adviser to Minister of Roads and Urban Development (Iran) and a member of Iranian Securities and Exchange Commission. He was the founder of Eghtesad Novin (EN) Bank, the first Iranian non-governmental bank, and a member of editorial board of various financial journals and the founder and owner of Sarmayeh (The Capital) newspaper. He also had several positions including the Secretary General of Tehran Stock Exchange (2003–2005), adviser to the Minister of Economic Affairs and Finance (2001–2005) and many different posts in Iranian financial sector.

== Early life and education ==
Hossein Abdoh Tabrizi was born on September 4, 1951, in Tehran, Iran. In 1973, he got his BA in Business from Tehran Business School and a BA in English Translation from Allameh Tabatabaei University. In 1974, he graduated from Iran Center for Management Studies (a Harvard affiliated business school) with a Master of Business Administration (MBA) degree. In 1976, he advanced his academic studies by submitting a PhD degree in the field of Finance and Banking to the Manchester Business School.

== Career ==
Abdoh Tabrizi started teaching in the mid-1970s. Since then he lectured at many universities, research centers and organizations. Sharif University of Technology (2010-present), Tehran University, Shahid Beheshti University (1983-present), Allameh Tabatabaei University and Imam Sadiq University are among universities where he has taught finance. He spent some years at Iran's Institute for Research on Planning and Development, Imam Sadiq University and Allameh Tabatabaei University as full-time teaching staff.

He has held a number of senior roles across the economic and financial sector, including as CEO of Sakhteman Iran Investments Co. (1997-2001), Board of Directors chairman for Iran's Investment Institutions Association (2007-2010), and CEO of Novin Investment Bank (2008-2010). He is currently chairman for Kherad Payeh Financial Investment & Consulting Co. (2005-present), Taban Kherad Financial Research & Consulting Co. (2006-present), and Sadr Pars Management Group (2008-present). He was a member of the Securities and Exchange Commission (2013-2018), the Electricity Market Regulatory Board (2014-2017), and Haram Reconstruction Fund's Trustee Committee (2014-2018) and has been a member of Urmia University's Trustee Committee since 2010.

From 2003 to 2005, he was Secretary General at the Tehran Stock Exchange. Governmentally, he served as honorary adviser to the Minister of Economic Affairs and Finance between 2001 and 2005 and to the Minister of Roads and Urban Development from 2013 to 2017. He is also an honorary think tank member in the Electricity and Water division of the Ministry of Energy. He assumed the role of Senior Economic Adviser in the Tehran Chamber of Commerce in 2010 and in the Iran Chamber of Commerce in 2014.

Additionally, he has been a member of editorial boards at various financial journal, is a think tank member at the Teachers' Pension Fund, and acts as Senior Adviser to Iran Power Plant Projects Management Company (MAPNA).

His research has extended to areas such as the 2008 financial crisis, investigating the economic bubble at Tehran Stock Exchange, capital structure theory, capital market governance, real estate finance and behavioral finance in Tehran Stock Exchange. At the top of his private businesses, Hossein Abdoh Tabrizi had a public life all through these years advising Ministries, Banks, Stock Market, Capital Market and Businesses. In January 1987, he claimed that the Tehran stock market has no competitor for continued growth and the housing market has entered a recession and said that a significant part of the people cannot afford housing and the banking system cannot provide facilities for housing purchase. In this situation, the rates in big cities have reached a point where maybe 80% of people cannot afford housing.

== Personal ventures ==
Abdoh Tabrizi is the founder of EN Bank and served as its chairman from 2001 to 2003; leasing chairman from 2006 to 2010; CEO of EN Investment Bank from 2006 to 2008; and is currently EN's Senior Economic Adviser. He also owns Pishboard Publishing House and is founder and owner of Sarmayeh (The Capital) newspaper.

== Publications ==
- Risk and Return
- Financial Management
- Financial Markets and Institutions
- Cases in Financial Management
- Finance and Investment Articles (1–2)
- Measuring and Managing the Market Risk
- A Dictionary of Finance and Investment
- Chain of Value Creation
