= Alireza Siasirad =

Iranian businessman and politician

- Education: Amirkabir University of Technology
- Political party: Executives of Construction Party

Seyed Alireza Siasirad (Persian: سید علیرضا سیاسی‌راد) is an Iranian businessman and reformist politician. He is currently the deputy secretary-general of Executives of Construction Party, and formerly served as the secretary-general of Iron Ore Producers' and Exporters' Association of Iran (IROPEX).

Party political offices
Preceded by Saeed Laylaz	Deputy Secretary-General of Executives of Construction Party; 2019–2022	Succeeded by Farzaneh Torkan
Business positions
Unknown	Secretary-General of Iron Ore Producers' and Exporters' Association of Iran; Unknown–2018	Succeeded by Saeed Askarizadeh
