= Morteza Alviri =

Iranian politician (born 1948)

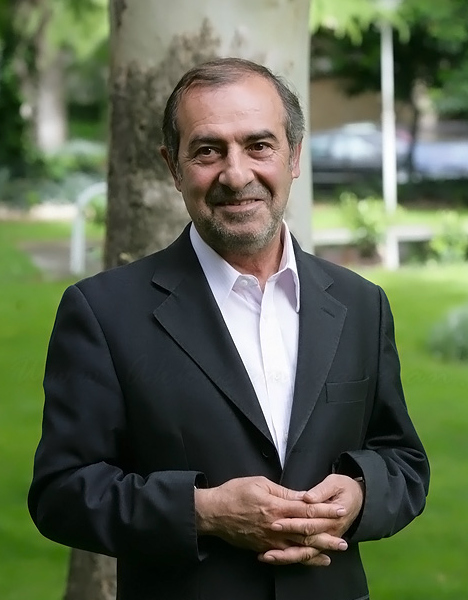

Member of City Council of Tehran
- In office 23 August 2017 – 4 August 2021

Chairman pro tem of City Council of Tehran
- In office 22 May 2017 – 19 August 2017 Serving with Mehdi Chamran (Sitting chairman)
- Deputy: Ahmad Masjed-Jamei
- Preceded by: Mehdi Chamran
- Succeeded by: Mohsen Hashemi Rafsanjani

Ambassador to Spain
- In office 22 June 2003 – 22 June 2006
- President: Mohammad Khatami; Mahmoud Ahmadinejad

Mayor of Tehran
- In office 1 June 1999 – 19 February 2002
- Preceded by: Gholamhossein Karbaschi
- Succeeded by: Mohammad Haghani (Acting)

Member of Parliament
- In office 28 May 1988 – 28 May 1992
- Constituency: Tehran, Rey and Shemiranat
- Majority: 413,022 (47%)
- In office 28 May 1980 – 28 May 1984
- Constituency: Damavand
- Majority: 13,201 (68.1%)

Personal details
- Born: 23 November 1948 (age 77) Damavand, Tehran province, Iran
- Party: Executives of Construction Party
- Other political affiliations: Mojahedin of the Islamic Revolution Organization (1980s); People's Mujahedin of Iran (late 1960s)
- Education: Sharif University of Technology

Military service
- Allegiance: Iran
- Branch/service: Imperial Iranian Army
- Years of service: 1974–1976
- Rank: Private

Morteza Alviri (Persian: مرتضی الویری, born 23 November 1948) is an Iranian politician who served as Mayor of Tehran from 1999 to 2001.

== Education ==
He is a graduate in Electrical Engineering from the Sharif University of Technology in Tehran and has a Master's in Management from the State Management Training Center.

== Career ==
During the regime of Mohammad Reza Pahlavi he was imprisoned for activities with the Fallah organisation.

After the Iranian revolution he was elected an MP in the Majlis of Iran in 1980 and 1988. He was a close associate of then-speaker Ali Akbar Hashemi Rafsanjani.

Alviri was a supporter of Grand Ayatollah Hossein-Ali Montazeri, who was dismissed as Ayatollah Khomeini's deputy in 1988, and as a result Alviri was prevented from running in the 1992 Majlis elections. Since then he moved from leftist to economically liberal views, and has served in various governmental positions including the Ministry of Mines and Metals and was secretary of the Supreme Council for Free Trade Zones during the presidency of Mohammad Khatami and Ali Akbar Hashemi Rafsanjani.

He was unanimously selected as the Mayor of Tehran in June 1999 by the fifteen Tehran City Councillors following the imprisonment of the serving mayor, Gholamhossein Karbaschi, on corruption charges. He is associated with Rafsanjani's Executives of Construction Party. In November 2001, he narrowly avoided impeachment by the council.

In February 2002 he resigned as Mayor. In June 2003 he was appointed as Iran's ambassador to Spain. He was replaced by Seyyed Davoud Salehi on 22 June 2006.

== Arrest ==
Mr. Alviri, Karrobi's representative to a committee tasked with investigating post-election crimes, was taken into custody by armed intelligence agents on 8 September 2009.
