= Foreign involvement in the 2006 Lebanon War =

Foreign involvement in the 2006 Lebanon War refers to the supply of military aid to combatants during the course of the 2006 Lebanon War, which has been an important aspect of both the hostilities and the diplomatic wrangling surrounding them, including figuring prominently into UN Security Council resolutions on the topic.

== Support of Hezbollah ==
Iran's help to Hezbollah in preparation for the war was invaluable. According to Israeli journalist Ze'ev Schiff, Iran supplied most of Hezbollah's arms, "including modern antitank weapons and its thousands of rockets." Iranian advisors spent years helping Hezbollah train and build fortified positions throughout southern Lebanon. The U.S., British, and Israeli governments have said that Iran provides military aid to Hezbollah, specifically for this conflict.

Iranian Secretary-general of the "Intifada conference" Ali Akbar Mohtashami Pur then retracted the denial, explicitly telling the Shargh newspaper that Hezbollah is in possession of the long-range Zelzal-2. He also claimed that Iran transferred the missiles so that they could be used to defend Lebanon.

Iran provides between US$50–100 million annually, and Hezbollah received Iranian-supplied weaponry, including 11,500 rockets and missiles already in place. Three thousand Hezbollah militants have undergone training in Iran, which included guerrilla warfare, firing missiles and rocket artillery, operating unmanned drones, marine warfare and conventional war operations, and 50 pilots have been trained in Iran in the past two years.

The United Nations claimed that the Somali Islamic Courts Union (ICU), an Islamist politico-military organization then in control of much of Somalia, had sent 720 troops to fight alongside Hezbollah during the war. Hezbollah rejected the claims as "incorrect and silly" and Hassan Dahir Aweys of the ICU Shura council called on the UN stop publishing "baseless propaganda".

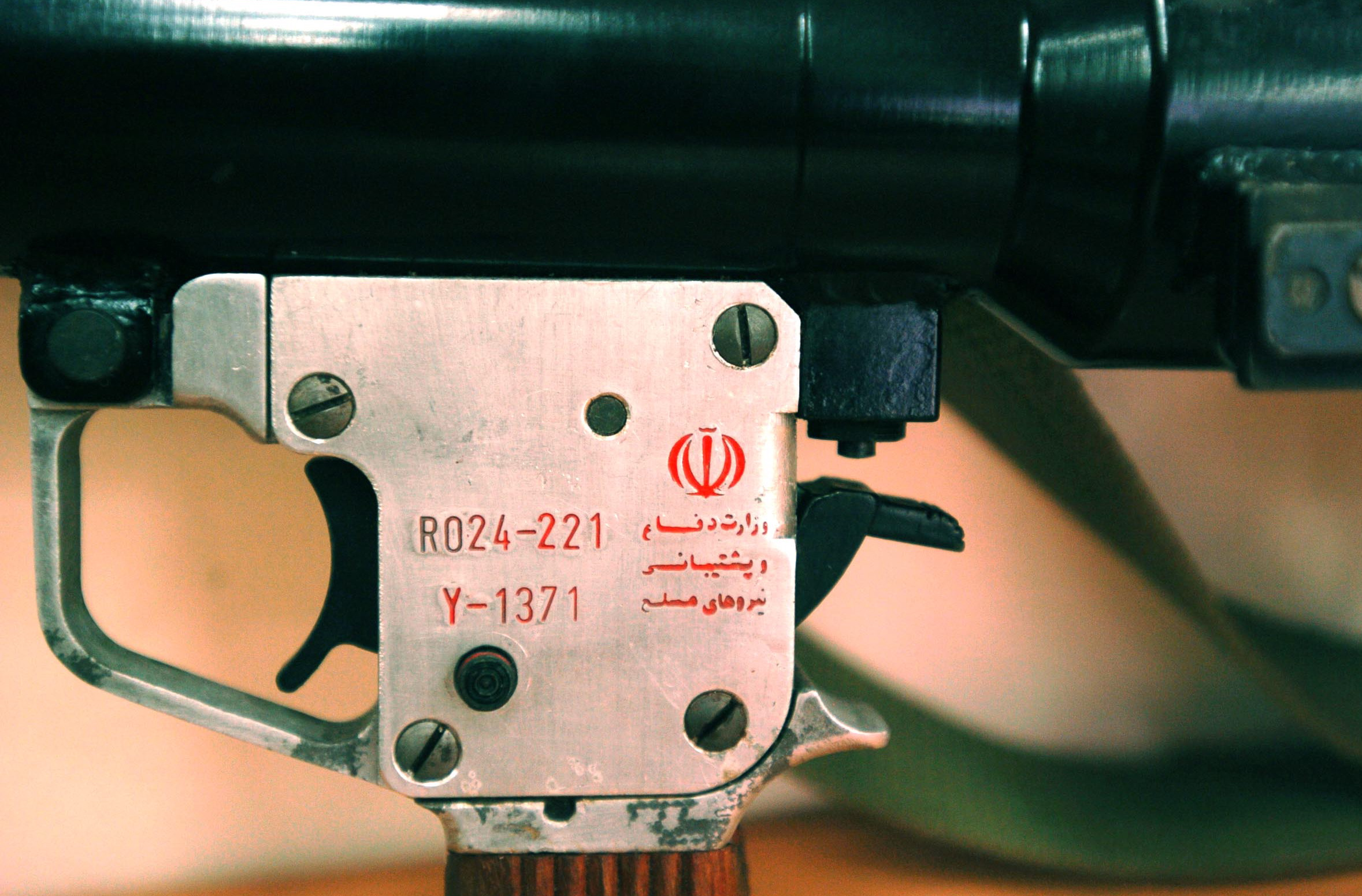
A grenade launcher with a symbol of Iran displayed by Israel as "found in Lebanon during the 2006 Lebanon War"

Iranian Revolutionary Guards were believed to have directly assisted Hezbollah fighters in their attacks on Israel. Multiple sources suggested that hundreds of Revolutionary Guard operatives participated in the firing of rockets into Israel during the war, and secured Hezbollah's long-range missiles. Revolutionary Guard operatives were allegedly seen operating openly at Hezbollah outposts during the war. In addition, Revolutionary Guard operatives were alleged to have supervised Hezbollah's attack on the INS Hanit with a C-802 anti-ship missile. The attack severely damaged the warship and killed four crewmen. It is alleged that between six and nine Revolutionary Guard operatives were killed by the Israeli military during the war. According to the Israeli media, their bodies were transferred to Syria and from there flown to Tehran.

During the conflict, the August 7, 2006 edition of Jane's Defence Weekly reported that Iran answered Hezbollah's August 4 call for "a constant supply of weapons to support its operations against Israel". According to Western diplomatic sources, Iran will supply advanced Russian, Chinese, and Iranian designed Surface-to-air missile systems, in addition to Hezbollah's current stock of Iranian-delivered Strela 2 MANPADS. As recently as November 19, 2006, US and Lebanese intelligence are concerned that Hezbollah is re-arming itself with longer-range missiles via Iran and Syria in defiance of the cease-fire and disarmament agreement.

== Support to Lebanon ==
The US State Department announced a financial assistance package of $10 million US to the Lebanese Armed Forces on 29 July 2006. The previous level of assistance was $1.5 million US. A spokesman indicated that the aim of the aid was "finish the work of [UN] Resolution 1559," and that the additional assistance would go towards "some very basic issues, such as providing spare parts and maintenance and other kinds of things for trucks and personnel carriers and other vehicles".

On August 21, 2006, President George W. Bush announced that US reconstruction aid to Lebanon would be boosted to 230 million dollars.

== Security Council Resolution 1559 ==
On September 2, 2004, the United Nations Security Council adopted Resolution 1559 calling for the disbanding of all Lebanese militias, among other things, and an armed Hezbollah in South Lebanon is seen by many to be a contravention of the resolution, though the Lebanese government differs on its interpretation.

Iran has been accused by the head of the Israel Defense Forces Intelligence Division, Major General Amos Yadlin, of masking illegal transfers to Hezbollah as "humanitarian aid".

British Prime Minister Tony Blair claimed in a speech on 1 August 2006 that Hezbollah was armed by Iran, and US President Bush has repeatedly blamed Iran and Syria for supporting Hezbollah.

== Support of Israel ==
As the campaign in Lebanon began, on 14 July, the U.S. Congress was notified of a potential sale of US$210 million worth of jet fuel to Israel. The Defense Security Cooperation Agency noted that the sale of the JP-8 fuel, should it be completed, will "enable Israel to maintain the operational capability of its aircraft inventory....The jet fuel will be consumed while the aircraft is in use to keep peace and security in the region."

According to Reuters and The New York Times, the Bush administration authorised the expedited processing and shipment of precision-guided bombs, already allotted for sale in 2005, to Israel to support the Israeli campaign, but it did not announce the increased haste publicly.

It was reported on 24 July that the United States was in the process of providing Israel with "bunker buster" bombs, which would be used to target the leader of Lebanon's Hezbollah guerrilla group and destroy its trenches.

It was reported in the 3 August edition of Salon.com that the US National Security Agency (NSA) was providing signals intelligence to the IDF allowing them details on whether Iran and Syria were supplying new military aid to Hezbollah.

== See also ==
- History of Lebanon
- History of the Middle East
- Multinational Force in Lebanon in 1982
- United Nations Interim Force In Lebanon
- International law and the Arab-Israeli conflict
