= Shahrvand-e-Emrooz =

News and political magazine in Iran (2007–2011)

- Editor-in-chief: Mohammad Ghoochani; Mohammad Reza Khojasteh Rahimi
- Categories: News magazine Political magazine
- Frequency: Weekly
- Founded: 2007
- First issue: March 2007
- Final issue: September 2011
- Country: Iran
- Based in: Tehran
- Language: Persian

Shahrvand-e-Emrooz (Persian: شهروند امروز, lit. 'Today’s Citizen') was a Persian-language weekly news magazine that was in circulation between March 2007 and September 2011.

== History and profile ==
Shahrvand-e-Emrooz was launched in March 2007. Mohammad Ghoochani and Mohammad Reza Khojasteh Rahimi served as the editor-in-chief of the weekly. The magazine, based in Tehran, was a reformist publication and was the Persian version of TIME magazine. Shahrvand-e-Emrooz published significant interviews with leading figures, including Hassan Rouhani in 2008 and Hassan Khomeini, grandson of Ayatollah Khomeini, in February 2008.

== Bans and closure ==
Shahrvand-e-Emrooz was first closed down when it published a picture of U.S. President Barack Obama and his daughter on the cover of its 8 November 2008 issue. The weekly was also shut down in June 2009 following the presidential election. The publication resumed on 2 July 2011, but it was again closed down in September 2011 due to the publication of a digital picture which mocked former President Mahmoud Ahmedinejad and his confidant Esfandiar Rahim Mashaei.
