= Bahman Ahmadi Amouee =

Iranian journalist (born c. 1967)

- Born: c. 1967; Chaharmahal and Bakhtiari Province, Iran
- Education: Babolsar College of Economics and Social Sciences
- Occupation: journalist
- Organization: Sarmayeh
- Known for: 2009 imprisonment
- Spouse: Jila Baniyaghoob
- Awards: Hellman-Hammett award (2011)

Bahman Ahmadi Amouee (Persian: بهمن احمدی امویی; born c. 1967) is an Iranian journalist. He served as an editor at the pro-reform business daily Sarmayeh before the paper's 2009 closing and his own imprisonment on state security charges. He is married to fellow journalist Jila Baniyaghoob, who was also imprisoned for her journalistic work.

== Background ==
Amouee is a member of the nomadic Bakhtiari people from Southwestern Iran, and spent the first six years of his life in Chaharmahal and Bakhtiari Province. In order that Amouee could attend school, his family moved to Khuzestan province. He later studied economics at the Babolsar College of Economics and Social Sciences, and then moved into economic journalism.

Amouee became an editor at the pro-reform business daily Sarmayeh and an active critic of the Iranian government's economic policies, calling the nation one of the most corrupt in the world. In 2008, he wrote an article questioning why the government could not account for US$238 billion in oil revenues. In addition to his work with the daily newspaper, he also wrote two books: The Political Economy of the Islamic Republic and How did Islamic Revolutionaries became Technocrats?

== 2009 arrest ==
Beginning in June 2009, Iran saw widespread protests following a disputed election in which President Mahmoud Ahmadinejad was re-elected amid allegations of voter fraud. On the night of 20 June, Amouee and Baniyaghoob were arrested at their home by plainclothes police officers, as part of a general crackdown on journalists. On 4 January 2010, Amouee was sentenced to a flogging of 32 lashes as well as seven years and four months' imprisonment on charges of "gathering and colluding with intent to harm national security", "spreading propaganda against the system", "disrupting public security" and "insulting the president". The Committee to Protect Journalists protested the sentence, calling it "unlawful" and "patently political".

In the same month, Baniyaghoob was tried and convicted for "spreading propaganda against the system" and "insulting the president". The court banned her from practicing journalism for thirty years and sentenced her to a year in prison. Amnesty International designated both Amouee and Baniyaghoob to be prisoners of conscience, "detained solely for their peaceful exercise of the right to freedom of expression", and called for their immediate release. Human Rights Watch also lobbied for Amouee's release, stating that his imprisonment was a violation of freedom of speech; in 2011, the organization named him a winner of its Hellmann-Hammett award.

Amouee is serving his sentence at Evin Prison. On 26 July 2010, he was transferred to solitary confinement, prompting him to begin a hunger strike along with several other jailed journalists.
