= Seda (magazine) =

Iranian magazine franchise

- Editor: Mohammad-Javad Rouh
- Former editors: Mohammad Ghouchani; Saeed Laylaz; Akbar Montajabi
- Frequency: Weekly
- Format: Magazine
- Publisher: Ali Raei
- First issue: 5 July 2014; 10 years ago
- Country: Iran
- Language: Persian

Seda (Persian: صدا, lit. 'Voice') is an Iranian weekly news magazine that covers current affairs.

In May 2019, Seda was shut down by the authorities for its cover depicting a United States Navy aircraft carrier fleet with the caption "At the crossroads between war and peace". On its editorial, the magazine had warned that an attempt to close the Strait of Hormuz would lead to a "widespread war" and urged negotiations with the United States. This prompted the Committee to Protect Journalists to call for lifting the suspension on the publication.

== Political alignment ==
Seda is a reformist publication and was formerly affiliated with the Executives of Construction Party. It is now considered close to the Union of Islamic Iran People Party.
