= Sarmayeh =

- Type: Daily business newspaper
- Editor: Saeed Laylaz, Bahman Ahmadi Amouee
- Staff writers: Jila Baniyaghoob
- Ceased publication: 2009
- Language: Persian

Sarmayeh (Persian: سرمایه; lit. 'The Capital') was a Persian-language daily business newspaper published in Tehran, Iran, until it was banned from publishing by the Iranian government, and several of its reporters and editors were arrested on state security charges in 2009.

== Journalism ==
Sarmayeh's editorial stance was pro-reform. Reporter Jila Baniyaghoob wrote a section for a time discussing women's economic issues, but the section was cancelled in 2008 by the newspaper's more conservative management. Baniyaghoob's husband, editor Bahman Ahmadi Amouee, regularly critiqued the Iranian government's economic policies, calling the nation one of the most corrupt in the world. In 2008, he wrote an article questioning why the government could not account for US$238 billion in oil revenues.

== 2009 arrests and banning ==
Beginning in June 2009, Iran saw widespread protests following a disputed election in which President Mahmoud Ahmadinejad was re-elected amid allegations of voter fraud. On the night of 20 June, husband-and-wife Sarmayeh team Baniyaghoob and Amouee were arrested at their home by plainclothes police officers, as part of a general crackdown on journalists. On 4 January 2010, Amouee was sentenced to a flogging of 32 lashes as well as seven years and four months' imprisonment on charges of "gathering and colluding with intent to harm national security", "spreading propaganda against the system", "disrupting public security" and "insulting the president". In the same month, Baniyaghoob was tried and convicted for "spreading propaganda against the system" and "insulting the president". The court banned her from practicing journalism for thirty years and sentenced her to a year in prison. Editor Saeed Laylaz was also arrested.

Amnesty International designated both Amouee and Baniyaghoob to be prisoners of conscience, "detained solely for their peaceful exercise of the right to freedom of expression", and called for their immediate release. Human Rights Watch also lobbied for Amouee's release, stating that his imprisonment was a violation of freedom of speech; in 2011, the organization named him a winner of its Hellmann-Hammett award. In 2009, the International Women's Media Foundation awarded Baniyaghoob its Courage In Journalism prize, stating that she had "fearlessly reported on government and social oppression, particularly as they affect women". The following year, she won the Freedom of Speech Award of Reporters Without Borders.

On 2 November 2009, the press supervisory board of Iran banned Sarmayeh. Four more publications close to the Green Movement were also banned in Iran in 2009, including Hayat-e-No.

== See also ==
- Censorship in Iran
- List of newspapers in Iran
