= Mohammad Ghouchani =

Iranian journalist

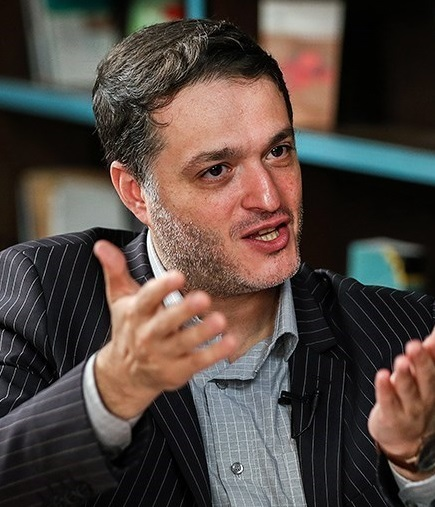
- Ghouchani in 2020
- Born: 22 September 1976 (age 49); Rasht, Iran
- Education: University of Tehran
- Occupation: Journalist
- Known for: Chief editor of Sazandegi newspaper
- Political party: Executives of Construction Party

Mohammad Ghouchani (Persian: محمد قوچانی, born 22 September 1976 in Rasht) is an Iranian journalist. He has served as editor-in-chief of various reformist print media, many of which have been banned by the authorities.

== Early life and education ==
Ghouchani was born in 1976 in the city of Rasht. He graduated from the University of Tehran with a degree in Political Science.

== Career ==
He started his career in Jame'eh, the most famous among the newspapers that started after the reformer Mohammad Khatami became the president in 1997. Ghouchani also wrote for Asr-e Azadegan and became the "star" of that publication. In 2000, he won political columnist of the year prize at the Iranian Press Festival, but was jailed shortly after for his writings.

He became the first editor-in-chief of Shargh in 2003 until it was closed down in September 2006. He then held the same position at Ham-Mihan between May and June 2007, when the latter was also banned. From 2007 to 2008, he was editor of the weekly magazine Shahrvand-e-Emrooz. Ghouchani then served as the editor-in-chief of Etemad-e Melli, the official organ of National Trust Party led by Mehdi Karroubi. He was also in charge of the women's lifestyle magazine Irandokht, another publication close to Karroubi, until its office was raided in December 2009. In the aftermath of 2009 Iranian presidential election protests, Ghouchani was imprisoned along with many journalists and both his publications were closed down. After 131 days in detention, he was released on bail.

With ease of pressure on media as Hassan Rouhani took office, Ghouchani published a pre-issue of Ham-Mihan on 26 October 2013, but the judicial system allegedly prevented republication of the newspaper. He also served as the editor-in-chief of Aseman and Mehrnameh. The former was a weekly magazine that was turned into a daily newspaper, but it was shut down by the judicial authorities less than a week after its launch in February 2014.

== Views ==
Ghouchani is a critic of Neo-Shariatism.

In 2004, Ghouchani spoke out about the red lines that could not be crossed in Iran, and said he views the ethical standard for journalism in Iran as "not lying to society". He also stated "Journalism is our job, our passion and our life, something that we don’t want to lose, unless we reach the point where we cannot work honorably".

Media offices
New title Media founded	Editor-in-Chief of Agahi-e-No; 2020–present	Incumbent
New title Media founded	Editor-in-Chief of Sazandegi; 2018–2021	Succeeded by Akbar Montajabi
New title Media founded	Editor-in-Chief of Siasatnameh; 2015–2020	Succeeded by Hamed Zareh
Preceded by Saeed Laylaz	Editor-in-Chief of Seda; 2015–2017; 2014	Succeeded by Akbar Montajabi
New title	Editor-in-Chief of Seda; 2015–2017; 2014	Succeeded by Saeed Laylaz
New title Media founded	Editor-in-Chief of Mardom-e-Emrouz; 2014–2015	Vacant Banned
New title Media founded	Editor-in-Chief of Aseman; 2011–2015	Vacant Banned
New title Media founded	Editor-in-Chief of Tajrobeh; 2011–2017	Succeeded by Mehdi Yazdani Khorram
New title Media founded	Editor-in-Chief of Mehrnameh; 2010–2017	Vacant Publication ceased
Preceded by Abolfazl Shakouri	Editor-in-Chief of Etemad-e-Melli; 2008–2009	Vacant Banned
New title Media founded	Editor-in-Chief of Shahrvand-e-Emrooz; 2007–2008	Vacant Banned Title next held by Reza Khojasteh-Rahimi
New title Media founded	Editor-in-Chief of Ham-Mihan; 2013; 2007	Vacant Banned
New title Media founded	Editor-in-Chief of Irandokht; 2006–2010	Vacant Banned
New title Media founded	Editor-in-Chief of Shargh; 2003–2006	Succeeded by Editorial board
