= Jila Baniyaghoob =

Iranian journalist (born 1970)

- Born: 21 August 1970 (age 56)
- Education: Allameh Tabatabai University
- Occupation: journalist
- Organization(s): Sarmayeh; Kanoon Zanan Irani
- Spouse: Bahman Ahmadi Amouee
- Awards: Courage In Journalism Award (2009); RSF Freedom of Speech Award (2010)

Jila Baniyaghoob (or Zhīlā Banī Yaʻqūb, Persian: ژيلا بنى يعقوب; born 21 August 1970) is an Iranian journalist and women's rights activist. She is the editor-in-chief of the website Kanoon Zanan Irani ("Focus on Iranian Women"). Baniyaghoob is married to fellow journalist Bahman Ahmadi Amou'i, an editor at Sarmayeh, a business newspaper.

== Early life ==
Baniyaghoob was born on 21 August 1970, in Iran. As a young child in Iran, Baniyaghoob was exposed to the political atmosphere very young. She was surrounded by chaos and political influence for most of her childhood, but it wasn't until 1979, when Jila Baniyaghoob became a journalist. She was 11 years old at the time when she wrote and published a short story about children and poverty in a major daily newspaper called Kayhan. While she was young, many of her teachers encouraged her talent in writing. These teachers were politically engaged against the conservative who had taken over the country of Iran, some of which were arrested and persecuted for their political views. This gave Baniyaghoob the insight behind the political atmosphere starting from a young age and used it as an early building block for her career in covering politics as well as the economic factors of discrimination against women.

== Career in journalism ==
Baniyaghoob began her career as a journalist while working for the daily newspaper Hamshahri while attending college at Allameh Tabatabayi University. Baniyaghoob has worked for many publications since college such as Sarmayeh newspaper, and now as editor-in-chief of the website Kanoon Zanan Irani where contributors inside and outside of Iran provide news about women's issues. Her site has been repeatedly filtered by the Iranian government. Baniyaghoob is known for being a freelance Iranian reporter, author, and activist who focuses her reporting on how government and social oppression affect women. As a journalist, Baniyaghoob has faced numerous ramifications and has been arrested, beaten and imprisoned on numerous occasions for her reporting. While working for the Sarmayeh newspaper, Baniyaghoob started a column on women's economy, which featured interviews with experts on the gender issues of economics. The column was canceled in 2008 by the paper's management. Baniyaghoob traveled throughout the Middle East, including Afghanistan, Palestine, Lebanon, and Syria from 2001–2002. She has written about women and refugees she encountered on her trip, covering issues of social and legal discrimination. Baniyaghoob was arrested in June 2006, when security forces attacked a peaceful gathering of women's rights activists in front of the University of Tehran, where she was covering the event for Sarmayeh. She was also arrested in March 2007 while covering those who opposed the Islamic Revolutionary Court's trial of women's rights activists. She was imprisoned in a wing of Tehran's Elvin prison where she was blindfolded and subjected to numerous interrogations by the Iranian Intelligence Ministry who operate the prison. She was later sent to prison in September 2008 after being found guilty of "disruption of public order, failure to obey police orders and propagandizing against the Islamic regime. Most recently she was arrested in June 2009 while covering the post-election protests in Iran and was later released in August. In 2010, Iran sentenced Baniyaghoob to jail for one year and banned her from writing for over 30 years over post-election unrest.

Baniyaghoob is a founding member of the One Million Signatures Campaign for Equality, which aims to change the discriminatory laws against women in Iran. She has also published a book, Journalists in Iran. Her book documents the experiences of Iranian journalists and women under duress, as well as some of her own experiences. Baniyaghoob also published a second book, Women of Evin: Ward 209, which is based on her firsthand observations of women prisoners in Evin Prison in Tehran and will be published outside of Iran.

In 2008, she was imprisoned a third time for covering a women's rally, on charges of "disruption of public order, failure to obey police orders and propagandizing against the Islamic regime".

== 2009 arrest ==
Beginning in June 2009, Iran saw widespread protests following a disputed election in which President Mahmoud Ahmadinejad was re-elected amid allegations of voter fraud. On the night of 20 June, both Baniyaghoob and her husband were arrested at their home by plainclothes police officers, as part of a general crackdown on journalists. Amou'i was jailed that year on charges of "gathering and colluding with intent to harm national security", "spreading propaganda against the system", "disrupting public security" and "insulting the president". In 2010, Baniyaghoob was tried and convicted for "spreading propaganda against the system" and "insulting the president". The court banned her from practicing journalism for thirty years and sentenced her to a year in prison.

On 2 September 2012, she was summoned to Evin Prison to begin the sentence. Amnesty International designated her a prisoner of conscience, "held solely for peacefully exercising her rights to freedom of expression", and called for her to be released and allowed to resume her profession.

In 2009, the International Women's Media Foundation awarded Baniyaghoob its Courage In Journalism prize, stating that she had "fearlessly reported on government and social oppression, particularly as they affect women". The following year, she won the Freedom of Speech Award of Reporters Without Borders. In 2009, the International Women's Media Foundation awarded Baniyaghoob its Courage in Journalism prize, stating that she had "fearlessly reported on government and social oppression, particularly as they affect women". The following year, she won the Freedom of Speech Award of Reporters Without Borders.

== Legacy ==
Baniyaghoob is known for her fearless reporting on the oppression of women and the government. She refuses to censor her work and as a result, she has been fired from some media outlets. She continues to travel through the Middle East to report on the lives of women and refugees. Her reporting continues to make her a target of the Iranian government.
