= Shargh =

Iranian daily newspaper

- The front page of Shargh on 21 February 2026
- Type: Daily newspaper Online
- Format: Broadsheet
- Owner: Mehdi Rahmanian
- Publisher: Golriz Institute
- Editor: Ali Dehghan (newspaper); Sina Rahimpour (online)
- Founded: 24 August 2003; 23 years ago
- Headquarters: Fatemi Street, Tehran, Iran
- Circulation: 30,000 Daily (2015)
- Website: www.sharghdaily.com

Shargh (Persian: شرق, lit. 'East'; also Romanized as Sharq) is one of the most popular Reformist daily newspapers in Iran.

The owner is Mehdi Rahmanian, the editor-in-chief of the newspaper is Ali Dehghan and the editor-in-chief of online is Sina Rahimpour.

== History and profile ==
Shargh was founded in 2003. The daily is managed by Mehdi Rahmanian. Its chief editor was Mohammad Ghouchani in its first period of publication. Mohammad Ghouchani and Mohammad Atrianfar, its ex-head of policy-making council, left Shargh in March 2007 and joined Ham-Mihan, another reformist newspaper managed by Gholamhossein Karbaschi.

Arash Karami, an Iranian journalist, described Shargh as the opposite of conservative paper Kayhan in terms of political stance.

== Bans ==
Shargh had published 141 editions before the temporary ban by the Iranian judiciary system on 4 February 2004, one day before the parliament election, following the publication of an open letter from some members of the outgoing parliament to Ayatollah Khamenei, the Supreme Leader. The letter was read to journalists by Mohsen Armin, one of the organizers of the MPs sit-in criticizing the settings of the Council of Guardians.

The situation got more interesting when Mehdi Rahmanian, Shargh's manager in charge, met Saeed Mortazavi, Tehran's general prosecutor, the next day to discuss a removal of the ban. After that, Rahmanian wrote a public letter asking for forgiveness, saying that he couldn't confirm that the letter was actually from the MPs and signed by them, and that even in the case it was, it would have been a non-professional act to publish "offensive" texts.

Mortazavi announced that he had ordered the ban because of a request by the High Council of National Security, which Hassan Rowhani, the council's chair, and Mohammad Khatami, the president, later denied on 20 and 23 February, respectively, mentioning the matter was not even discussed at the council's meeting. The ban was removed on 28 February 2004, and Shargh was published again from 3 March 2004. Shargh was shut down again on 11 September 2006 by the Iranian government.

In March 2007, Iran's hardline judiciary allowed a number of banned reformist dailies to republish, including the flagship centrist daily Shargh after a half-year ban. However, the daily was banned after publishing an interview with Iranian-Canadian poet Saghi Ghahraman in August 2007. The interview was viewed as counter-revolutionary and immoral by the press directory.

The digital newspaper Your Middle East reported on 26 September 2012 that Shargh had been banned over a controversial cartoon that shows a group of men covering each other's eyes with ribbons. The newspaper, one of the few remaining dailies close to the reformists, published the cartoon on 25 September and provoked anger among Iranian lawmakers as well as officials, who said the cartoon insulted Iranian fighters in the Iran–Iraq War (1980–88). Iranian soldiers usually had ribbons reading holy words on their foreheads during the war.

== See also ==
- List of newspapers in Iran
