= Ham-Mihan =

Newspaper in Iran from 2000 to 2009

- Type: Daily newspaper
- Founder: Gholamhossein Karbaschi
- Founded: January 2000
- Ceased publication: July 2009
- Political alignment: Reformism (Iranian)
- Language: Persian
- Headquarters: Tehran, Iran
- Website: hammihanonline.ir

Ham-Mihan (Persian: هم‌میهن, lit. 'Compatriot') was a reformist Persian-language daily newspaper in Tehran, Iran. It was in circulation between 2000 and 2009.

== History and profile ==
In January 2000 Gholamhossein Karbaschi, former mayor of Tehran, established Ham Mihan after he was released from prison. He also ran the paper and was its managing editor.

The chief editor of Ham-Mihan was Mohammad Ghouchani. Mohammad Atrianfar served as the policy director of the paper which was based in Tehran.

The paper backed Akbar Hashemi Rafsanjani in the presidential elections held in 2005. It was temporarily closed in May 2000 and in July 2007 by a court in Tehran. The paper was relaunched in 2009, but was suspended in July 2009.

In September 2013, Karbaschi petitioned the Ministry of Culture and Islamic Guidance to lift the ban on publication and his request was accepted. However, the publication license was not granted.

== See also ==
- List of newspapers in Iran
