= Gholamhossein Karbaschi =

Iranian politician (born 1954)

- غلامحسین کرباسچی
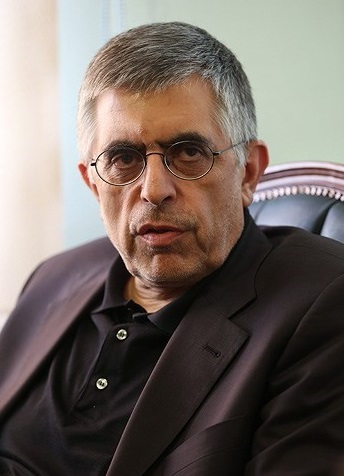
- Karbaschi in 2015

Mayor of Tehran
- In office January 1990 – April 1998
- Appointed by: Abdollah Nouri
- Preceded by: Morteza Tabatabaei (acting)
- Succeeded by: Morteza Alviri

Governor of Esfahan Province
- In office 14 February 1983 – 7 January 1990
- President: Ali Khamenei; Akbar Hashemi Rafsanjani
- Prime Minister: Mir-Hossein Mousavi
- Preceded by: Abdollah Koupayi
- Succeeded by: Mohammad-Reza Vaqefi

Personal details
- Born: 23 August 1954 (age 72) Qom, Iran
- Party: Executives of Construction Party

Military service
- Branch/service: Gendarmerie
- Years of service: 1980–1983
- Commands: Ideological–Political

Gholamhossein Karbaschi (Persian: غلامحسین کرباسچی, romanized: Gholām-Hosein Karbāschī, Persian pronunciation: [ɣolɑːmhoˈsein kaɾbɑːsˈt͡ʃiː]; born 23 August 1954) is an Iranian politician and former Shia cleric who was the Mayor of Tehran from 1990 until 1998. He is considered politically reformist and is a close ally of former president Mohammad Khatami. He was arrested, tried, convicted and imprisoned on corruption charges in what the New York Times claimed "was widely seen among moderates as a politically motivated attack" by the government's conservatives and hard-liners to thwart President Mohammad Khatami's reformist agenda. He was the General Secretary of Executives of Construction Party until 2021.

== Background ==
Karbaschi was trained as a cleric in the holy city of Qom and spent time in Evin Prison for his political activities before the Islamic Revolution.

Karbaschi was a driving force for many new modernization efforts. As the Mayor of Tehran he was known for having bulldozed apartment buildings and office buildings built without city approval, removed revolutionary graffiti from walls, planted thousands of trees, banned much of the private traffic in central Tehran and opened more than a hundred parks. Karbaschi also angered bazaar merchants by raising taxes and contributing to the city's soaring real estate prices, earning him the reputation during his time as mayor of "the most loved and hated man in Tehran." He started the first Iranian full colour newspaper, Hamshahri when he was the mayor of Tehran.

Karbaschi was one of the key supporters of President Mohammad Khatami's first presidential election campaign which led to Khatami's landslide victory (1997). After Khatami's victory, a power struggle started within the political establishment of Iran between the reformists and conservatives of the Iranian government. Karbaschi's arrest in April 1998 prompted thousands of student demonstrators to clash with riot police, and the Interior Minister (who was later arrested for sacrilege) to complain that he had not been informed of the arrest despite the fact that Karbaschi was a member of the president's cabinet in addition to being mayor of Iran's capital and largest city.

== Trial and imprisonment ==
Karbaschi was arrested on 4 April 1998 on corruption charges. The prosecution of Karbaschi was called "the most prominent part of a campaign" by Iranian clerical conservatives "to thwart the reformist administration" of President Mohammad Khatami, rather than an honest attempt to "uncover and punish" financial corruption. The trial was often "a heated debate — at times a shouting match" — between judge Gholam Hossein Mohseni-Ejehei and Karbaschi, who holds the same clerical rank as Ejei. The trial "captured record audiences" while being broadcast on Iranian television, and was "debated in detail" in Iran's press.

In July 1998 Karbaschi was convicted of corruption and misuse of funds and began serving a two-year sentence in May 1999, "despite last-ditch efforts by his supporters" including a petition "signed by more than 130 members of parliament — nearly half the chamber" — asking supreme leader Ali Khamenei for a pardon. In January 2000 Khamenei agreed to decree his amnesty.

== Post-release ==
He is also the manager of Ham-Mihan, a new reformist newspaper published in Tehran. This newspaper was forced to stop publishing twice. Once in the collective ban of almost all reformist newspapers in 2000 and again in July 2007 after a very short period of publication.

On 1 February 2026, Karbaschi gave an interview with the anti-government IranWire concerning the 2025–2026 Iranian protests, stating that "officials, both reformists and non-reformists, do not have a proper understanding of the new generation of society, and the generational gap has turned into generational animosity, leading to the recent protests and tragedies."

== See also ==
- Iranian reform movement

Government offices
| Preceded by Abdollah Koupayi | Governor of Esfahan; 1983–1990 | Succeeded by Mohammad-Reza Vaqefi |
| Preceded by Morteza Tabatabaee | Mayor of Tehran; 1990–1998 | Succeeded by Morteza Alviri |
Military offices
| New title | Representative of the Supreme leader in Gendarmerie; 1980–1983 | Succeeded by Ali-Akbar Ashtiani |
Party political offices
| New title Party established | Secretary-General of Executives of Construction Party; 1998–2021 | Succeeded by Hossein Marashi |
| Preceded by Ali Akbar Mohtashamipur | Campaign manager of Mehdi Karroubi; 2009 | Vacant |
| Preceded by Mohammad-Reza Zafarghandi as Islamic Association of Iranian Medical Society representative | Rotating President of the Council for Coordinating the Reforms Front; 22 October 2016–20 January 2017 | Succeeded by Mahmoud Sadeghi as Islamic Association of University Instructors representative |
