= Cabinet of Iran =

Iranian cabinet

The Cabinet of Iran (Persian: هیئت‌دولت ایران, romanized: Heyatedovlat-e Iran) is a formal body composed of government officials, ministers, chosen and led by the President of Iran. Its composition must be approved by a vote of parliament. According to the Constitution of the Islamic Republic of Iran, a president may dismiss members of the cabinet, but must do so in writing, and new appointees must again be approved by parliament. Cabinet meetings are held weekly on Saturdays in Tehran and are chaired by the president. There may be additional meetings as circumstances require. The Supreme Leader of Iran has the power to dismiss cabinet members like ministers, vice presidents and presidents at any time, regardless of parliamentary decisions.

== Pre-revolution ==
From 1699 until 1907 the Iranian cabinet was led by Premiers who were appointed by the Shah of Iran.

The Persian Constitutional Revolution of 1905 led to the creation of the Persian Constitution of 1906 and the establishment of the Iranian parliament, whose members were elected from the general population. The position of premier was abolished and replaced by the Prime Minister of Iran. The constitution stipulated that all Prime Minister must be subject to a vote in parliament for both approval and removal.

During the period 1907 to 1951 all Prime Ministers were selected by the Shah and subject to a vote-of-confidence by the Iranian Parliament. From 1951 to 1953, the members of parliament elected the Prime Minister among themselves (the head of the party holding the majority of seats), through a vote-of-confidence. The Shah, as the head of state, then appointed the parliament's selection to the position of Prime Minister, in accordance with the Westminster system of parliamentary democracy. Following the removal of Prime Minister Mohammad Mosaddegh via the 1953 Iranian coup d'état, this practice was abolished and the selection of Prime Minister reverted to the process in effect before 1951.

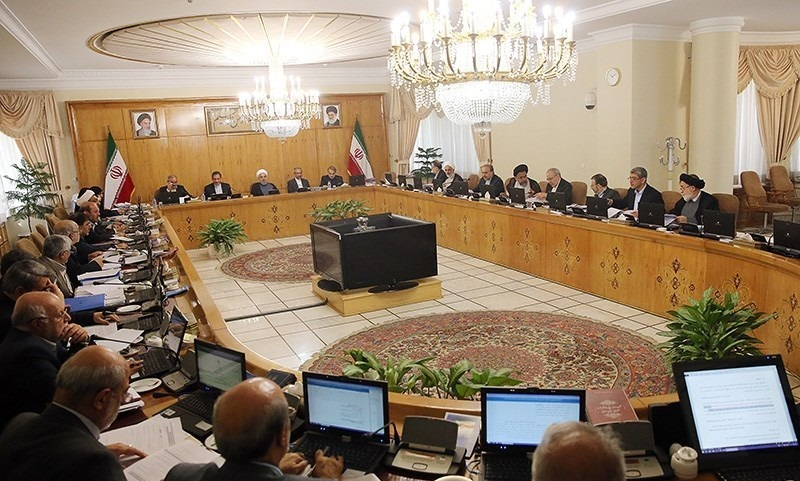
President Rouhani chairs a cabinet meeting, 1 October 2015

== Post-revolution ==
Following the Iranian Revolution of 1979, the position of Shah was removed as the head of state, effectively ending Iran's history of monarchy. Iran's new Islamic constitution stipulated that the President of Iran would nominate the Iranian cabinet, including the Prime Minister, which was to be approved by a vote-of-confidence in the Iranian parliament. The constitutional amendment of 1989 effectively ended the position of Prime Minister and transferred its powers to that of the president and vice president.

=== 2009 appointments ===
President Ahmadinejad announced controversial ministerial appointments for his second term. Esfandiar Rahim Mashaei was briefly appointed as first vice president, but opposed by a number of Majlis members and by the intelligence minister, Gholam-Hossein Mohseni-Eje'i. Mashaei followed orders to resign. Ahmadinejad then appointed Mashaei as chief of staff, and fired Mohseni-Eje'i.

On 26 July 2009, Ahmadinejad's government faced a legal problem after he sacked four ministers. Iran's constitution (Article 136) stipulates that, if more than half of its members are replaced, the cabinet may not meet or act before the Majlis approves the revised membership. The Vice Chairman of the Majlis announced that no cabinet meetings or decisions would be legal, pending such a reapproval.

The main list of 21 cabinet appointments was announced on 19 August 2009. On 4 September, Parliament of Iran approved 18 of the 21 candidates and rejected three of them, including two women. Sousan Keshavarz, Mohammad Aliabadi, and Fatemeh Ajorlou were not approved by Parliament for the Ministries of Education, Energy, and Welfare and Social Security respectively. Marzieh Vahid-Dastjerdi won approval as health minister, making her Iran's first woman minister since the Islamic revolution. President Ahmadinejad announced controversial ministerial appointments for his second term. Esfandiar Rahim Mashaei was briefly appointed as first vice president, but opposed by a number of Majlis members and by the intelligence minister, Gholam-Hossein Mohseni-Eje'i. Mashaei followed orders to resign. Ahmadinejad then appointed Mashaei as chief of staff, and fired Mohseni-Eje'i.

On 26 July 2009, Ahmadinejad's government faced a legal problem after he sacked four ministers. Iran's constitution (Article 136) stipulates that, if more than half of its members are replaced, the cabinet may not meet or act before the Majlis approves the revised membership. The Vice Chairman of the Majlis announced that no cabinet meetings or decisions would be legal, pending such a reapproval.

The main list of 21 cabinet appointments was announced on 19 August 2009. On 4 September, Parliament of Iran approved 18 of the 21 candidates and rejected three of them, including two women. Sousan Keshavarz, Mohammad Aliabadi, and Fatemeh Ajorlou were not approved by Parliament for the Ministries of Education, Energy, and Welfare and Social Security respectively. Marzieh Vahid-Dastjerdi won approval as health minister, making her Iran's first woman minister since the Islamic revolution.

=== 2011 merges and dismissals ===
On 9 May, Ahmedinejad announced Ministries of Petroleum and Energy would merge, as would Industries and Mines with Commerce, and Welfare with Labour. On 13 May, he dismissed Masoud Mir-Kazemi (Minister of Petroleum), Ali Akbar Mehrabian (Minister Industry and Mines) and Sadegh Mahsouli (Minister of Welfare). On 15 May, he was announced he would be caretaker minister of the Petroleum Ministry.

From August 2009 to February 2013, a total of nine ministers in the cabinet was dismissed by the Majlis, the last of who was labor minister, Reza Sheykholeslam at the beginning of February 2013. On 9 May, Ahmedinejad announced Ministries of Petroleum and Energy would merge, as would Industries and Mines with Commerce, and Welfare with Labour. On 13 May, he dismissed Masoud Mir-Kazemi (Minister of Petroleum), Ali Akbar Mehrabian (Minister Industry and Mines) and Sadegh Mahsouli (Minister of Welfare). On 15 May, he was announced he would be caretaker minister of the Petroleum Ministry.

From August 2009 to February 2013, nine ministers in the cabinet were dismissed by the Majlis, the last of who was labor minister, Reza Sheykholeslam at the beginning of February 2013.

=== Hassan Rouhani ===
Hassan Rouhani was elected as President of Iran in 2013 presidential election and took office on 3 August 2013. He nominated his coalition cabinet members to the parliament for vote of confidence on the next day. 15 out of 18 designated ministers were confirmed by the parliament.

== Current members ==
Portfolio	Portrait	Minister	Party	Took office	Left office	Ref.1	Ref.2
President of Iran
President		Masoud Pezeshkian	Non-Partisan	28 July 2024	Incumbent		
Vice presidents of Iran
First Vice President		Mohammad Reza Aref	Non-Partisan	28 July 2024	Incumbent		
Vice President for Strategic Affairs		Mohammad Javad Zarif	Non-Partisan	1 August 2024	2 March 2025		
Vice President for Strategic Affairs		Mohsen Esmaeili	Non-Partisan	15 April 2025	Incumbent		
Vice President for Executive Affairs		Mohammad Ja'far Ghaempanah	Islamic Association of Iranian Medical Society	1 August 2024	Incumbent		
Vice President for Parliamentary Affairs		Shahram Dabiri Oskuei	Welfare and Health Party	4 August 2024	5 April 2025		
Vice President for Parliamentary Affairs		Mohsen Esmaeili	Non-Partisan	15 April 2025	Incumbent		
Vice President for Plan and Budget Affairs		Hamid Pourmohammadi	Non-Partisan	4 August 2024	Incumbent		
Vice President for Science, Technology and Knowledge-Based Economy Affairs		Hossein Afshin	Islamic Society of Students	10 August 2024	Incumbent		
Vice President for Atomic Energy Affairs		Mohammad Eslami	Military	29 August 2021	Incumbent		
Vice President for Martyrs and Veterans Affairs		Saeed Ohadi	Non-Partisan	10 August 2024	Incumbent		
Vice President for Women and Family Affairs		Zahra Behrouz Azar	Union of Islamic Iran People Party	10 August 2024	Incumbent		
Vice President for Legal Affairs		Majid Ansari	Association of Combatant Clerics	22 August 2024	Incumbent		
Vice President for Environmental Protection Affairs	Shina_Ansari_in_2024	Shina Ansari	Non partisan	22 August 2024	Incumbent		
Vice President for Administrative and Recruitment Affairs		Aladdin Rafizadeh	Non partisan	17 September 2024	Incumbent		
Vice President for Rural Development Affairs and disadvantaged Regions		Abdolkarim Hosseinzadeh	Non-Partisan	2 November 2024	Incumbent		
Vice President for Standards Affairs		Farzaneh Ansari	Non-Partisan	8 December 2024	Incumbent		
Vice President for Optimization and Strategic Management of Energy Affairs		Esmaeil Saqqab Esfahani	Non-partisan	12 November 2025	Incumbent		
Ministers
Agriculture Jihad Minister		Gholamreza Nouri Ghezeljeh	Executives of Construction Party	21 August 2024	Incumbent		
Cooperatives, Labour, and Social Welfare Minister		Ahmad Meydari	Non-Partisan	21 August 2024	Incumbent		
Culture and Guidance Minister		Abbas Salehi	Non-Partisan	21 August 2024	Incumbent		
Cultural Heritage, Tourism and Handicrafts Minister		Reza Salehi Amiri	Moderation and Development Party	21 August 2024	Incumbent		
Defence and Armed Forces Logistics Minister		Aziz Nasirzadeh	Military	21 August 2024	28 February 2026		
Education Minister		Alireza Kazemi	Non-Partisan	21 August 2024	Incumbent		
Economic and Finance Affairs Minister		Abdolnaser Hemmati	Executives of Construction Party	21 August 2024	2 March 2025		
Economic and Finance Affairs Minister		Rahmatollah Akrami (acting)	Nonpartisan	2 March 2025	16 June 2025		
Economic and Finance Affairs Minister		Ali Madanizadeh	Nonpartisan	16 June 2025	Incumbent		
Energy Minister		Abbas Aliabadi	Military	21 August 2024	Incumbent		
Foreign Affairs Minister		Abbas Araghchi	Non-Partisan	21 August 2024	Incumbent		
Health and Medical Education Minister		Mohammad-Reza Zafarghandi	Islamic Association of Iranian Medical Society	21 August 2024	Incumbent		
Information and Communications Technology Minister		Sattar Hashemi	Non-Partisan	21 August 2024	Incumbent		
Industry, Mine and Trade Minister		Mohammad Atabak	Non-Partisan	21 August 2024	Incumbent		
Intelligence Minister		Esmaeil Khatib	Non-Partisan	21 August 2024	Incumbent		
Interior Minister		Eskandar Momeni	Military	21 August 2024	Incumbent		
Justice Minister		Amin Hossein Rahimi	Non-Partisan	21 August 2024	Incumbent		
Petroleum Minister		Mohsen Paknejad	Non-Partisan	21 August 2024	Incumbent		
Roads and Urban Development Minister		Farzaneh Sadegh	Non-Partisan	21 August 2024	Incumbent		
Science, Research and Technology Minister		Hossein Simaee Sarraf	Non-Partisan	21 August 2024	Incumbent		
Sport and Youth Minister		Ahmad Donyamali	Non-Partisan	21 August 2024	Incumbent		
Other Duties
Chief of Staff		Mohsen Haji-Mirzaei	Non-Partisan	28 July 2024	Incumbent		
Supervisor of Presidential Administration		Mohammad Ja'far Ghaempanah	Non-Partisan	1 August 2024	Incumbent		
Head of National Elites Foundation		Hossein Afshin	Islamic Society of Students	10 August 2024	Incumbent		
Head of Atomic Energy Organization		Mohammad Eslami	Military	29 August 2021	Incumbent		
Head of Martyrs and Veterans Foundation		Saeed Ohadi	Non-Partisan	10 August 2024	Incumbent		
Head of the Foreign Travel Supervision Board		Mohsen Haji-Mirzaei	Non-Partisan	12 August 2024	Incumbent		
Head of Environmental Protection Organization	Shina_Ansari_in_2024	Shina Ansari	Non-Partisan	22 August 2024	Incumbent		
Head of the Government Information Council		Elias Hazrati	National Trust Party	28 August 2024	Incumbent		
Spokesperson of the Government of Iran		Fatemeh Mohajerani	Islamic Society of Students	28 August 2024	Incumbent		
Head of Administrative and Recruitment Affairs Organization		Aladdin Rafizadeh	Non-Partisan	17 September 2024	Incumbent		
Head of National Standards Organization		Farzaneh Ansari	Non-Partisan	8 December 2024	Incumbent		
Head of Optimization and Strategic Management of Energy Organization		Esmaeil Saqqab Esfahani	Non-partisan	12 November 2025	Incumbent		

== List of governments ==
- Cabinet of Mehdi Bazargan
- Interim Government of Iran (1979–80)
- Presidency of Abolhassan Banisadr (1980–81)
- Abolished administration of Mohammad-Javad Bahonar (1981)
- Interim Government of Iran (1981)
- Premiership of Mir-Hossein Mousavi (1981–89)
- Presidency of Akbar Hashemi Rafsanjani (1989–97)
- Presidency of Mohammad Khatami (1997–2005)
- Presidency of Mahmoud Ahmadinejad (2005–2009)
- Presidency of Mahmoud Ahmadinejad (2009–2013)
- Presidency of Hassan Rouhani (2013–2017)
- Presidency of Hassan Rouhani (2017–2021)
- Presidency of Ebrahim Raisi (2021–2024)
- Government of Mohammad Mokhber (2024)
- Presidency of Masoud Pezeshkian (2024–Present)

== See also ==
- List of female members of the Cabinet of Iran
