= Government of Masoud Pezeshkian =

Fourteenth government of Iran

Masoud Pezeshkian Cabinet
- 14th Cabinet of Islamic Republic of Iran
- President of Iran
- President Masoud Pezeshkian in 2026

People and organisations
- Supreme Leader of Iran: Ali Khamenei (assassinated); Vacant (Interim Leadership Council took over the duties); Mojtaba Khamenei
- President of Iran: Masoud Pezeshkian
- Vice President of Iran: Mohammad Reza Aref
- No. of ministers: 19

History
- Election: 2024 Iranian presidential election
- Legislature term: 12th term
- Predecessor: Government of Ebrahim Raisi

Masoud Pezeshkian is the ninth president of Iran. He took the position on 28 July, after the presidential election that was held in Iran in June–July 2024. His presidential decree was signed on July 28, 2024, by the Supreme Leader of the Islamic Republic of Iran, Ali Khamenei, and his government formally started its work.

In his first act as president, Pezeshkian appointed Mohammad Reza Aref as the First Vice President and Mohsen Haji Mirzaei as Chief of Staff.

On 21 August, the Islamic Consultative Assembly approved the nomination of Pezeshkian's entire cabinet, the first time it had done since 2001.

== Cabinet members ==
Portfolio	Portrait	Minister	Party	Took office	Left office	Ref.1	Ref.2
President of Iran
President		Masoud Pezeshkian	Non-Partisan	28 July 2024	Incumbent		
Vice presidents of Iran
First Vice President		Mohammad Reza Aref	Non-Partisan	28 July 2024	Incumbent		
Vice President for Strategic Affairs		Mohammad Javad Zarif	Non-Partisan	1 August 2024	2 March 2025		
Vice President for Strategic Affairs		Mohsen Esmaeili	Non-Partisan	15 April 2025	Incumbent		
Vice President for Executive Affairs		Mohammad Ja'far Ghaempanah	Islamic Association of Iranian Medical Society	1 August 2024	Incumbent		
Vice President for Parliamentary Affairs		Shahram Dabiri Oskuei	Welfare and Health Party	4 August 2024	5 April 2025		
Vice President for Parliamentary Affairs		Mohsen Esmaeili	Non-Partisan	15 April 2025	Incumbent		
Vice President for Plan and Budget Affairs		Hamid Pourmohammadi	Non-Partisan	4 August 2024	Incumbent		
Vice President for Science, Technology and Knowledge-Based Economy Affairs		Hossein Afshin	Islamic Society of Students	10 August 2024	Incumbent		
Vice President for Atomic Energy Affairs		Mohammad Eslami	Military	29 August 2021	Incumbent		
Vice President for Martyrs and Veterans Affairs		Saeed Ohadi	Non-Partisan	10 August 2024	20 December 2025		
Vice President for Martyrs and Veterans Affairs		Ahmad Mousavi	Non-Partisan	20 December 2025	Incumbent		
Vice President for Women and Family Affairs		Zahra Behrouz Azar	Union of Islamic Iran People Party	10 August 2024	Incumbent		
Vice President for Legal Affairs		Majid Ansari	Association of Combatant Clerics	22 August 2024	Incumbent		
Vice President for Environmental Protection Affairs	Shina_Ansari_in_2024	Shina Ansari	Non partisan	22 August 2024	Incumbent		
Vice President for Administrative and Recruitment Affairs		Aladdin Rafizadeh	Non partisan	17 September 2024	Incumbent		
Vice President for Rural Development Affairs and disadvantaged Regions		Abdolkarim Hosseinzadeh	Non-Partisan	2 November 2024	Incumbent		
Vice President for Standards Affairs		Farzaneh Ansari	Non-Partisan	8 December 2024	Incumbent		
Vice President for Optimization and Strategic Management of Energy Affairs		Esmaeil Saqqab Esfahani	Non-partisan	12 November 2025	Incumbent		
Ministers
Agriculture Jihad Minister		Gholamreza Nouri Ghezeljeh	Executives of Construction Party	21 August 2024	Incumbent		
Cooperatives, Labour, and Social Welfare Minister		Ahmad Meydari	Non-Partisan	21 August 2024	Incumbent		
Culture and Guidance Minister		Abbas Salehi	Non-Partisan	21 August 2024	Incumbent		
Cultural Heritage, Tourism and Handicrafts Minister		Reza Salehi Amiri	Moderation and Development Party	21 August 2024	Incumbent		
Defence and Armed Forces Logistics Minister		Mehrdad Akhlaghi	Nonpartisan	18 October 2026	Incumbent		
Education Minister		Alireza Kazemi	Non-Partisan	21 August 2024	Incumbent		
Economic and Finance Affairs Minister		Seyed Ali Madanizadeh	Nonpartisan	16 June 2025	Incumbent		
Energy Minister		Abbas Aliabadi	Military	21 August 2024	Incumbent		
Foreign Affairs Minister		Abbas Araghchi	Non-Partisan	21 August 2024	Incumbent		
Health and Medical Education Minister		Mohammad-Reza Zafarghandi	Islamic Association of Iranian Medical Society	21 August 2024	Incumbent		
Information and Communications Technology Minister		Sattar Hashemi	Non-Partisan	21 August 2024	Incumbent		
Industry, Mine and Trade Minister		Mohammad Atabak	Non-Partisan	21 August 2024	Incumbent		
Intelligence Minister		Esmaeil Khatib	Non-Partisan	21 August 2024	18 March 2026		
Intelligence Minister		Undeclared (acting)	Non-Partisan	March 2026	Incumbent		
Interior Minister		Eskandar Momeni	Military	21 August 2024	Incumbent		
Justice Minister		Amin Hossein Rahimi	Non-Partisan	21 August 2024	Incumbent		
Petroleum Minister		Hamid Bovard (acting)	Non-Partisan	4 October 2026	Incumbent		
Roads and Urban Development Minister		Farzaneh Sadegh	Non-Partisan	21 August 2024	Incumbent		
Science, Research and Technology Minister		Hossein Simaee Sarraf	Non-Partisan	21 August 2024	Incumbent		
Sport and Youth Minister		Ahmad Donyamali	Non-Partisan	21 August 2024	Incumbent		
Other Duties
Chief of Staff		Mohsen Haji-Mirzaei	Non-Partisan	28 July 2024	Incumbent		
Supervisor of Presidential Administration		Mohammad Ja'far Ghaempanah	Non-Partisan	1 August 2024	Incumbent		
Head of National Elites Foundation		Hossein Afshin	Islamic Society of Students	10 August 2024	Incumbent		
Head of Atomic Energy Organization		Mohammad Eslami	Military	29 August 2021	Incumbent		
Head of Martyrs and Veterans Foundation		Saeed Ohadi	Non-Partisan	10 August 2024	20 December 2025		
Head of Martyrs and Veterans Foundation		Ahmad Mousavi	Non-Partisan	20 December 2025	Incumbent		
Head of the Foreign Travel Supervision Board		Mohsen Haji-Mirzaei	Non-Partisan	12 August 2024	Incumbent		
Head of Environmental Protection Organization	Shina_Ansari_in_2024	Shina Ansari	Non-Partisan	22 August 2024	Incumbent		
Head of the Government Information Council		Elias Hazrati	National Trust Party	28 August 2024	Incumbent		
Spokesperson of the Government of Iran		Fatemeh Mohajerani	Islamic Society of Students	28 August 2024	Incumbent		
Head of Administrative and Recruitment Affairs Organization		Aladdin Rafizadeh	Non-Partisan	17 September 2024	Incumbent		
Head of National Standards Organization		Farzaneh Ansari	Non-Partisan	8 December 2024	Incumbent		
Head of Optimization and Strategic Management of Energy Organization		Esmaeil Saqqab Esfahani	Non-partisan	12 November 2025	Incumbent		

Cabinet of Iran
Preceded by Government of Ebrahim Raisi	Government of Pezeshkian; 2024–	Incumbent
