= Ministries of Iran =

Ministries in Iran

The Iranian government has 19 ministries. Their names and website are given in the table below.

Name	Secretary	Website
Agriculture Jihad	Gholamreza Nouri Ghezeljeh	https://www.maj.ir/
Information and Communications Technology	Sattar Hashemi	http://www.ict.gov.ir
Cooperatives, Labor and Social Welfare	Ahmad Meydari	http://www.mcls.gov.ir/
Cultural Heritage, Tourism and Handicrafts	Reza Salehi Amiri	https://www.mcth.ir
Culture and Islamic Guidance	Abbas Salehi	https://www.farhang.gov.ir/
Defense and Armed Forces Logistics	Mehrdad Akhlaghi	http://www.mod.ir
Economic Affairs and Finance	Seyed Ali Madanizadeh	https://www.mefa.ir
Education	Alireza Kazemi	https://www.medu.ir
Energy	Abbas Aliabadi	https://www.moe.gov.ir/
Foreign Affairs	Abbas Araghchi	http://www.mfa.gov.ir
Health and Medical Education	Mohammad-Reza Zafarghandi	https://behdasht.gov.ir/
Industry, Mine and Trade	Mohammad Atabak	http://www.mimt.gov.ir
Intelligence	Undeclared (Acting)	http://www.vaja.ir
Interior	Eskandar Momeni	https://www.moi.ir/
Justice	Amin Hossein Rahimi	https://www.justice.ir/
Petroleum	Hamid Bovard (Acting)	http://www.mop.ir/
Roads and Urban Development	Farzaneh Sadegh	http://www.mrud.ir
Science, Research and Technology	Hossein Simaee Sarraf	http://www.msrt.ir/
Sport and Youth	Ahmad Donyamali	https://msy.gov.ir/

== Proposed ==
- Ministry of Commerce

== Disbanded ==
- Ministry of Industries and Mines
- Ministry of Labour and Social Affairs
- Ministry of Revolutionary Guards
- Ministry of Welfare and Social Security
