= Government of Ebrahim Raisi =

Thirteenth government of Iran

Ebrahim Raisi Cabinet
- 13th Cabinet of Islamic Republic of Iran
- President of Iran
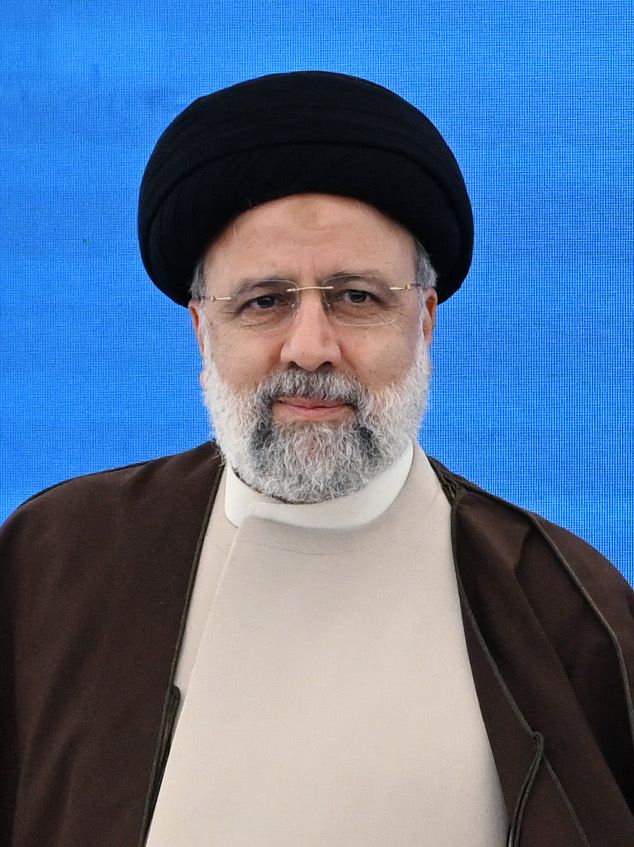
- Raisi in 2024
- Date formed: 3 August 2021
- Date dissolved: 28 July 2024

People and organisations
- Head of state: Ali Khamenei
- Head of government: Ebrahim Raisi (until May 19, 2024); Mohammad Mokhber (Acting from May 19 to July 28, 2024)
- Head of government's history: List: Chief Justice (2019–21); Assembly of Experts Member (2007–24)
- Deputy head of government: Eshaq Jahangiri (until 8 August 2021); Mohammad Mokhber
- No. of ministers: 19
- Member party: CCA; MDP; ECP; SDIR; Society of Pathseekers of the Islamic Revolution; Islamic Society of Athletes; Center for Islamic Iran Academics; Islamic Law Party; PFIRF; FIRS; RFII; Society for the Advancement of Popular Institutions of the Islamic Revolution; Islamic Iran Academics Association

History
- Incoming formation: Confirmation of Ebrahim Raisi's cabinet (2021)
- Election: 2021 Iranian presidential election
- Legislature term: 11th term
- Predecessor: Second Rouhani Government
- Successor: Government of Masoud Pezeshkian

Ebrahim Raisi was the eighth President of Iran. He served his term as president prior to his death in a helicopter crash and, second to Supreme Leader Ali Khamenei, was leading the thirteenth government of the Islamic Republic of Iran.

Mohammad Mokhber then became the acting President of Iran. He assumed the role on 19 May 2024, and was confirmed in his position by Khamenei on 20 May. The cabinet of Mokhber was inherited from the cabinet of Ebrahim Raisi; their main responsibility was then to hold a new presidential election; the first round was held on 28 June 2024 and the second round on 5 July 2024.

== Cabinet members ==
Portfolio	Minister	Took office	Left office	Party	Ref
Presidential Administration
President	Ebrahim Raisi	3 August 2021	19 May 2024†	CCA	
President	Mohammad Mokhber (acting)	19 May 2024	28 July 2024	Nonpartisan	
First Vice President	Eshaq Jahangiri	3 August 2021	8 August 2021	ECP	
First Vice President	Mohammad Mokhber	8 August 2021	28 July 2024	Nonpartisan	
Head of President's Office	Mahmoud Vaezi	3 August 2021	8 August 2021	MDP	
Head of President's Office	Gholam-Hossein Esmaeili	8 August 2021	28 July 2024	Nonpartisan	
Supervisor of Presidential Administration of Iran	Mahmoud Vaezi	3 August 2021	5 September 2021	MDP	
Supervisor of Presidential Administration of Iran	Sowlat Mortazavi	5 September 2021	19 October 2022	SDIR	
Supervisor of Presidential Administration of Iran	Mohsen Mansouri	1 November 2022	19 May or 28 July 2024	Nonpartisan	
Spokesperson of the Government of Iran	Ali Bahadori Jahromi	14 November 2021	28 July 2024	Nonpartisan	
Secretary of the Government Board of Iran	Ali Bahadori Jahromi	13 March 2022	28 July 2024	Nonpartisan	
Ministers
Agriculture Minister	Javad Sadatinejad	25 August 2021	15 April 2023	Center for Islamic Iran Academics	
Agriculture Minister	Mohammad Aghamiri*	15 April 2023	20 June 2023	Nonpartisan	
Agriculture Minister	Mohammad Ali Nikbakht	20 June 2023	19 May 2024	Nonpartisan	
Communications Minister	Issa Zarepour	25 August 2021	19 May 2024	Nonpartisan	
Labour and Social Welfare Minister	Hojjatollah Abdolmaleki	25 August 2021	14 June 2022	Popular Front of Islamic Revolution Forces	
Labour and Social Welfare Minister	Mohammad Hadi Zahedivafa*	14 June 2022	19 October 2022	Popular Front of Islamic Revolution Forces	
Labour and Social Welfare Minister	Sowlat Mortazavi	19 October 2022	19 May 2024	Society of Devotees of the Islamic Revolution	
Culture Minister	Mohammad Mehdi Esmaili	25 August 2021	19 May 2024	Center for Islamic Iran Academics	
Defence Minister	Mohammad-Reza Gharaei Ashtiani	25 August 2021	19 May 2024	RFII	
Finance Minister	Ehsan Khandozi	25 August 2021	19 May 2024	Nonpartisan	
Education Minister	Alireza Kazemi*	26 August 2021	28 November 2021	Nonpartisan	
Education Minister	Yousef Nouri	28 November 2021	3 April 2023	Nonpartisan	
Education Minister	Rezamorad Sahraei*	3 April 2023	30 May 2023	Islamic Iran Academics Association	
Education Minister	Rezamorad Sahraei	30 May 2023	19 May 2024	Islamic Iran Academics Association Society for the Advancement of Popular Institutions of the Islamic Revolution	
Energy Minister	Ali Akbar Mehrabian	25 August 2021	19 May 2024	Nonpartisan	
Foreign Minister	Hossein Amir-Abdollahian	25 August 2021	19 May 2024	Nonpartisan	
Health Minister	Bahram Eynollahi	25 August 2021	19 May 2024	Nonpartisan	
Industries and Business Minister	Reza Fatemi Amin	25 August 2021	30 April 2023	Nonpartisan	
Industries and Business Minister	Mahdi Niazi*	30 April 2023	13 June 2023	Nonpartisan	
Industries and Business Minister	Abbas Aliabadi	13 June 2023	19 May 2024	Nonpartisan	
Intelligence Minister	Esmaeil Khatib	25 August 2021	19 May 2024	Nonpartisan	
Interior Minister	Ahmad Vahidi	25 August 2021	19 May 2024	Military	
Justice Minister	Amin Hossein Rahimi	25 August 2021	19 May 2024	Nonpartisan	
Petroleum Minister	Javad Owji	25 August 2021	19 May 2024	Nonpartisan	
Science Minister	Mohammad Ali Zolfigol	25 August 2021	19 May 2024	Islamic Revolution Veterans Association	
Roads and Urban Development Minister	Rostam Ghasemi	25 August 2021	22 November 2022	Military	
Roads and Urban Development Minister	Shahriar Afandizadeh*	22 November 2022	7 December 2022	Nonpartisan	
Roads and Urban Development Minister	Mehrdad Bazrpash	7 December 2022	19 May 2024	FIRS	
Sports and Youth Minister	Hamid Sajjadi	25 August 2021	1 August 2023	Islamic Society of Athletes	
Sports and Youth Minister	Kioumars Hashemi*	1 August 2023	18 September 2023	Nonpartisan	
Sports and Youth Minister	Kioumars Hashemi	18 September 2023	19 May 2024	Nonpartisan	
Cultural Heritage Minister	Ezzatollah Zarghami	25 August 2021	19 May 2024	Popular Front of Islamic Revolution Forces	
Vice Presidents and other Spokespersons
Executive affairs Vice President	Sowlat Mortazavi	5 September 2021	19 October 2022	SDIR	
Executive affairs Vice President	Mohsen Mansouri	1 November 2022	19 May 2024	Nonpartisan	
Atomic Energy Vice President	Mohammad Eslami	29 August 2021	19 May 2024	Nonpartisan	
Environment Vice President	Ali Salajegheh	3 October 2021	19 May 2024	Nonpartisan	
Economic Vice President	Mohsen Rezaee	25 August 2021	11 June 2023	Military	
Legal Vice President	Mohammad Dehghan	1 September 2021	19 May 2024	Society of Pathseekers of the Islamic Revolution	
Martyrs Vice President	Amir-Hossein Ghazizadeh Hashemi	12 September 2021	19 May 2024	Islamic Law Party	
Parliamentary Vice President	Mohammad Hosseini	20 August 2021	12 May 2024	Center for Islamic Iran Academics	
Parliamentary Vice President	Mahmoud Hosseinipour	12 May 2024	19 May 2024	Nonpartisan	
Elites Vice President	Sorena Sattari	3 August 2021	18 September 2022	Nonpartisan	
Elites Vice President	Ruhollah Dehghani Firouz Abadi*	18 September 2022	2 November 2022	Nonpartisan	
Elites Vice President	Ruhollah Dehghani Firouz Abadi	2 November 2022	19 May 2024	Nonpartisan	
Plan Vice President	Masoud Mir Kazemi	11 August 2021	16 April 2023	FIRS	
Plan Vice President	Davoud Manzour	16 April 2023	19 May 2024	Nonpartisan	
Women's Vice President	Ensieh Khazali	1 September 2021	19 May 2024	Nonpartisan	
Administrative Vice President	Meysam Latifi	5 September 2021	19 May 2024	Nonpartisan	
Economical Spokesperson of the Government of Iran	Ehsan Khandozi	25 August 2021	28 July 2024	Coalition Council	
Aides
Aide to the president of Iran for Economic Affairs	Farhad Rahbar	5 September 2021	19 May 2024	Popular Front of Islamic Revolution Forces	
* Acting

Cabinet of Iran
Preceded by Second Government of Rouhani	Government of Raisi; 2021–2024	Succeeded by Government of Mokhber
