= White SIM Card =

SIM card providing unrestricted internet access in Iran

White SIM card (Persian: سیم‌کارت سفید) is a term used in Iranian media discourse and social networks to refer to a type of special internet access without filtering in Iran. The label is attributed to SIM cards or connections that allow the use of the internet without the restrictions normally applied to ordinary users. Such access is alleged to be granted to certain pro-government individuals or governmental bodies.

The term is usually raised in discussions related to "class-based Internet", a concept referring to differences in the level of internet access among different users. However, "white SIM card" is not an official or technical designation in operator documents or telecommunications regulations, and is instead used mainly as a media or colloquial expression to describe such forms of access.

== Origin ==
The wave of SIM cards without filtering is said to have begun during the second administration of Hassan Rouhani. In September 2019, the Minister of Communications Mohammad-Javad Azari Jahromi stated "The level of internet access of a physician or a university professor should not be equal to that of a child." During the same period, a special internet connection was offered to journalists so they could connect to the network with greater freedom, although a significant number of journalists refused to use it. At the time, their access to the global internet was unlimited and unfiltered, and it remained active even during the nationwide internet shutdown in Iran in 2019.

With the establishment of the Ebrahim Raisi administration in 2021, a significant portion of these white SIM cards were reportedly deactivated. In 2022, a plan called "launch" was implemented at Sharif University of Technology, which divided students and faculty into seven groups based on academic standing and differentiated their access levels; in June 2023, a proposal was raised to provide tiered internet access to professors and university faculty members.

Following the start of the Iran–Israel war, requests to convert SIM cards to "white" status reportedly increased significantly. According to unofficial statistics, by December 2025 approximately 50,000 unfiltered SIM cards were active in Iran.

=== Position in class-based internet ===
The term "white SIM card" is frequently mentioned within the broader discussion of class-based internet in Iran, a system publicly introduced by authorities in May 2025 to allow designated users to access the internet without government filtering. Critics state that providing unrestricted access to a limited group constitutes a form of unequal treatment and conflicts with principles of equitable access to information and digital services.

== Usage ==
White SIM cards are said to have the following features:

- Providing access to the Internet without filtering or with far fewer restrictions than those applied to ordinary users;
- Access being linked to the holder’s registered identification code;
- The ability to access the internet even during disruptions or periods of widespread public network shutdown;
- Inclusion in a list managed by operators or internet providers and typically allocated to "trusted" individuals.

== Emergence in Iran ==
On 25 November 2025, X (formerly Twitter) introduced a feature that allows users to see the country where an account is located. The feature led to controversy after several accounts linked to the government appeared to access the platform from Iran without signs of virtual private network use. The platform is normally blocked in Iran and typically requires tools that change the IP address to access it. The issue drew public attention, Some of the individuals involved had previously supported policies that restrict internet access in Iran.

After this information was published, individuals linked to the government issued public apologies. Some journalists, media figures, and politicians who had benefited from privileged internet access apologized and asked for their SIM cards to be returned to "normal" status. Among them was Saeed Jalili, who was reported to be one of the individuals with privileged access while also supporting restrictive internet policies.

According to reports, more than 50,000 "white SIM cards" exist in Iran.

=== Media coverage ===
The term became widely discussed in the 2020s on Iranian social media and drew increased attention during periods of nationwide internet disruption or restriction, such as the internet shutdowns in Iran in 2025 and 2026. Reports have pointed to the unrestricted activity of some accounts as evidence of such access.

=== Notable figures with white SIM cards ===
Some notable individuals reported to have white SIM cards include:

- Mohammad Bagher Ghalibaf
- Reza Rashidpour
- Alireza Ghorbani
- Mehran Rajabi
- Mohammad Ali Abtahi
- Mohammad Javad Zarif
- Fatemeh Mohajerani
- Alireza Dabir
- Abbas Araghchi
- Abbas Abdi
- Abbas Akhoundi
- Abbas Salehi
- Abdolnaser Hemmati
- Hamid Rasaee
- Mehrdad Bazrpash
- Sattar Hashemi
- Saeed Jalili
- Elika Abdolrazzaghi
- Cameron Behzadi, first distributor of the video of Shamkhani’s daughter's wedding
- Gholamhossein Karbaschi
- Elias Hazrati
- Hesamoddin Ashna
- Ali Rabiei
- Mohammad-Reza Zafarghandi
- Mohammad Ja'far Ghaempanah
- Minoo Khaleghi
- Ali Akbar Raefipour
- Hojjatollah Abdolmaleki
- Jalil Mohabbi
- Ahmad Meydari
- Ahmad Zeidabadi
- Amene Sadat Zabihpour
- Mohammad Javad Shakouri-Moghaddam
- Mohammad Delavari
- Elmira Sharifi Moghaddam
- Jalal Rashidi Koochei
- Amirhossein Sabeti
- Hossein Entezami
- Shahriyar Shams
- Vahid Yaminpour
- Peyman Aref
- Ali Owji

== See also ==
- Internet censorship in Iran
- Mobile Communications of Iran
- MTN Irancell
- Smart card
