= Rezamorad Sahraei =

Iranian politician

Dr. Rezamorad Sahraei
- رضامراد صحرایی
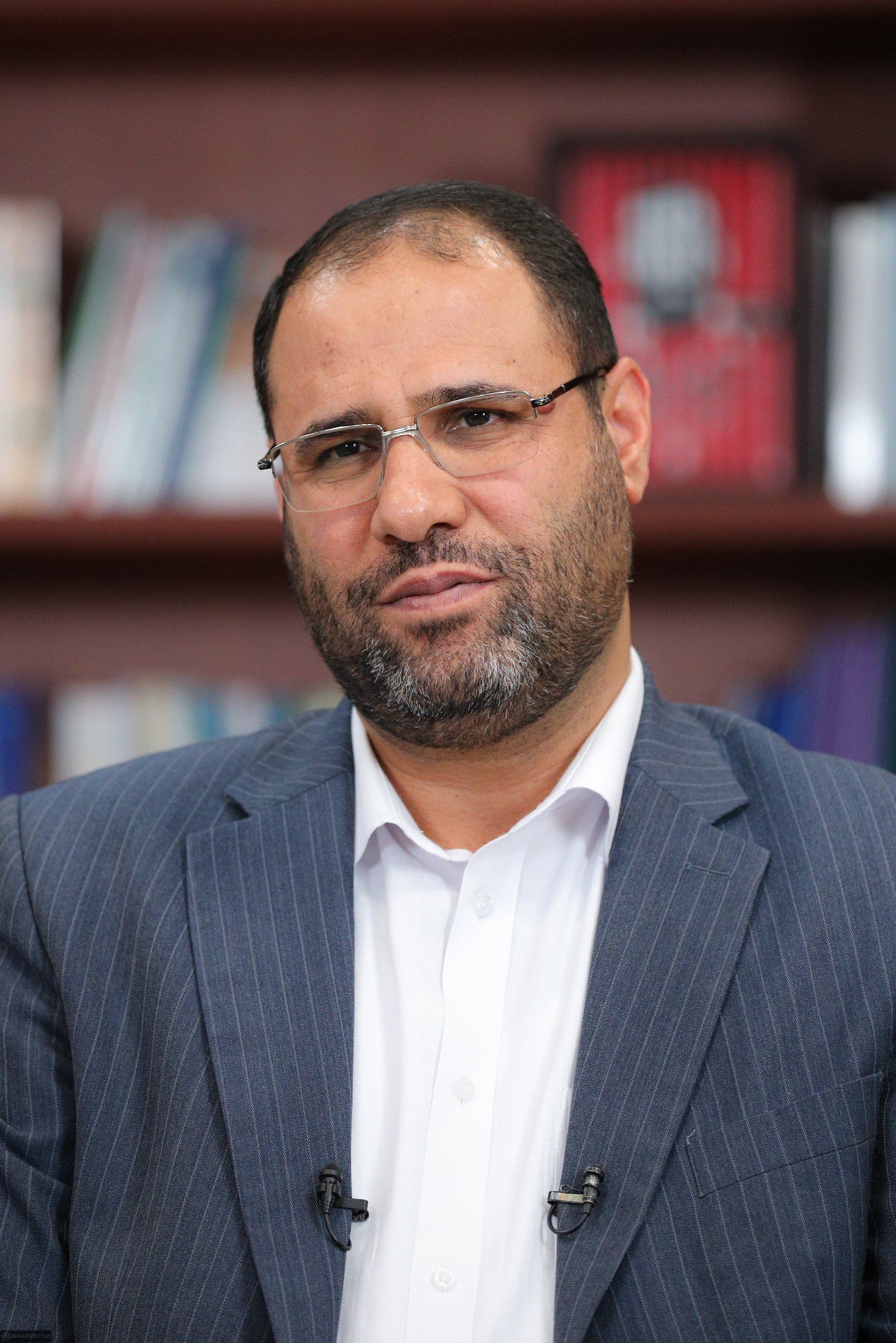
- Rezamorad Sahraee 2024

Minister of Education
- In office 30 May 2023 – 21 August 2024; Acting: 3 April – 30 May 2023
- President: Ebrahim Raisi
- Preceded by: Yousef Nouri
- Succeeded by: Alireza Kazemi

Personal details
- Born: 1977 (age 48–49) Tehran, Iran

Dr. Rezamorad Sahraei (Persian: رضامراد صحرایی; born 1977) is an Iranian politician who held the position of Minister of Education in the Government of Ebrahim Raisi from 2023 to 2024.

Sahraei was in charge of implementing policies of Sadreddin Shariati, the controversial head of Allameh Tabatabai University, who enforced a policy of strict sex segregation at the university in the early 2010s. According to Iran International, Sahraei is also mired in numerous cases of plagiarism, including his article about "morphological paradoxes."
