= Spokesperson of the Government of Iran =

Spokesperson of the Government
- سخنگوی دولت
- Emblem of Iran

- Flag of Iran

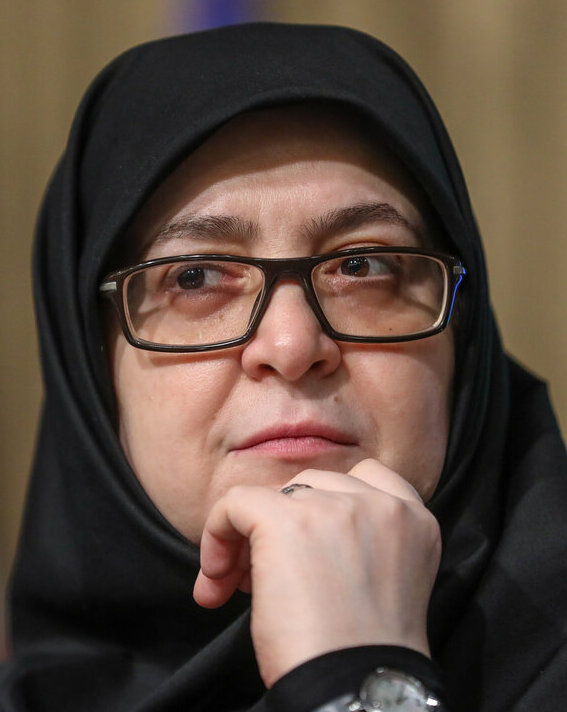
- Incumbent; Fatemeh Mohajerani since 28 August 2024
- Appointer: President of Iran
- Term length: No fixed term

The spokesperson of the Government of Iran is responsible for gathering and disseminating information regarding the Cabinet to the media. Currently, the position is held by Fatemeh Mohajerani.

== Spokespersons ==
=== Before 1979 revolution ===
No.	Name	Took office	Left office	Party	Cabinet	Prime Minister
	Hossein Fatemi	1951	19 August 1953	National Front	Mosaddegh	Mohammad Mosaddegh
	Abolhassan Amidi	1953	1953	Independent	Zahedi	Fazlollah Zahedi
	Abbas Farzanegan	1953	1955	Independent	Zahedi	Fazlollah Zahedi
	Hasan Arsanjani	5 May 1961	19 July 1962	Independent	Amini	Ali Amini
	Dariush Homayoon	August 1977	August 1978	Resurgence	Amouzegar	Jamshid Amouzegar

=== After 1979 revolution ===
As follows:

No.	Name	Took office	Left office	Party	Cabinet	President	Prime Minister
1	Abbas Amir-Entezam	13 February 1979	1 July 1979	FMI	Interim		Mehdi Bazargan
2	Sadeq Tabatabaei	1 July 1979	6 November 1979	FMI	Interim		Mehdi Bazargan
3	Hassan Habibi	8 November 1979	20 July 1980	FMI	Interim		vacant
4	Behzad Nabavi	17 December 1980	December 1981	MIRO	1st	Abolhassan Banisadr	Mohammad-Ali Rajai
4	Behzad Nabavi	17 December 1980	December 1981	MIRO	2nd	Mohammad-Ali Rajai	Mohammad-Javad Bahonar
4	Behzad Nabavi	17 December 1980	December 1981	MIRO	Interim	vacant	Mohammad-Reza Mahdavi Kani
5	Ahmad Tavakkoli	16 December 1981	3 August 1983	IRP	3rd	Ali Khamenei	Mir-Hossein Mousavi
	vacant				3rd	Ali Khamenei	Mir-Hossein Mousavi
	vacant				4th	Ali Khamenei	Mir-Hossein Mousavi
	vacant				5th	Akbar Hashemi Rafsanjani	
	vacant				6th	Akbar Hashemi Rafsanjani	
6	Ata'ollah Mohajerani	7 December 1997	14 December 2000	ECP	7th	Mohammad Khatami	
7	Abdollah Ramezanzadeh	19 December 2001	3 August 2005	IIPF	8th	Mohammad Khatami	
8	Gholam-Hossein Elham	7 August 2005	25 August 2009	—N/a	9th	Mahmoud Ahmadinejad	
9	Shamseddin Hosseini^{1}	10 January 2010	3 August 2013	—N/a	10th	Mahmoud Ahmadinejad	
10	Mohammad Reza Rahimi^{2}	10 January 2010	31 October 2012	—N/a	10th	Mahmoud Ahmadinejad	
(8)	Gholam-Hossein Elham	11 December 2012	3 August 2013	FIRS	10th	Mahmoud Ahmadinejad	
11	Mohammad Bagher Nobakht	28 August 2013	1 August 2018	MDP	11th	Hassan Rouhani	
11	Mohammad Bagher Nobakht	28 August 2013	1 August 2018	MDP	12th	Hassan Rouhani	
	vacant				12th	Hassan Rouhani	
12	Ali Rabii	30 May 2019	3 August 2021	ILP	12th	Hassan Rouhani	
13	Ehsan Khandozi^{1}	26 October 2021	28 July 2024	—N/a	13th	Ebrahim Raisi	
14	Ali Bahadori Jahromi	14 November 2021	28 July 2024	—N/a	13th	Ebrahim Raisi	
15	Fatemeh Mohajerani	28 August 2024	Incumbent	—N/a	14th	Masoud Pezeshkian	
1.Economic affairs spokesperson 2.Political affairs spokesperson

== See also ==
- Spokesperson for the Ministry of Foreign Affairs of Iran
