= Seyed Mahmood Hosseini =

Iranian politician

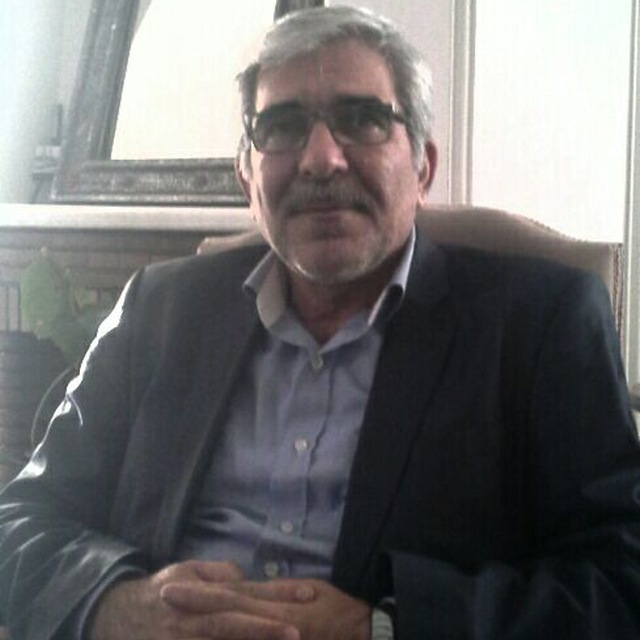

Governor of Isfahan province
- In office 6 August 2002 – 8 October 2005
- Succeeded by: Morteza Bakhtiari

Governor of Sistan and Baluchestan Province
- In office 1 September 1997 – 5 August 2002
- Appointed by: Mohammad Khatami

Personal details
- Born: Seyed Mahmood Hosseini Pozveh; December 1, 1954 (age 71) Khorasgan, Isfahan, Iran
- Party: Union of Islamic Iran People Party
- Children: 3
- Education: University of Isfahan

Seyed Mahmood Hosseini (born December 1, 1954) is an Iranian politician and former governor of provinces of Sistan va Balouchestan and Isfahan, Iran. He is assumed to be a member of the reformist party and an active member of BARAN Foundation founded by the president Mohammad Khatami. He was the Director of Human resources at the Iranian National gas company. He retired in 2017.

== Early life, education, and family ==
Hosseini was born and raised in Khorasgan, Isfahan, on December 1, 1954, and studied physics, holding a Bachelor's and Master's Degree from Isfahan University.

== Local and national politics ==
During President Ahmadinejad he tried for the 2008 Iran parliamentary election and later in 2011 for the city of Isfahan council election as one of the reformist candidates from Isfahan, but was disqualified by the Council of Guardians. During the protests about the 2009 Iran presidential election, Seyed Mahmood Hosseini signed an open letter to the top Iranian Shia clerics prepared by Mohammad Khatami, Mir Hossein Mousavi, Mehdi Karoubi and some of the renowned reformist figures, by pointing out the arrests after the election, as being the reference and support of the great nation of Iran, to remind the government about the damaging outcomes of their unlawful acts.

== Governor of Isfahan ==
Hosseini was appointed to Isfahan province governor on August 6, 2002, and held the position until October 8, 2005.

=== Semirom Riot ===
One of the irritating issues during Hosseini's time as provincial governor was the unrest that started on August 16, 2003, after a decision by the Isfahan Governor General's Office to incorporate Vardasht district of Semirom into the municipality of Dehaqan provoked the ire of the people of Vardasht. The people staged a demonstration to protest the decision, but the protests later turned violent. Eight people were reportedly killed in the violence, including two police officers and some 150 were injured. Later Hosseini, in an interview with Shargh newspaper, denied any involvement in ordering to confront police with people and said the number of killed was four.
