= Gholam-Hossein Elham =

Iranian politician

- غلامحسین الهام
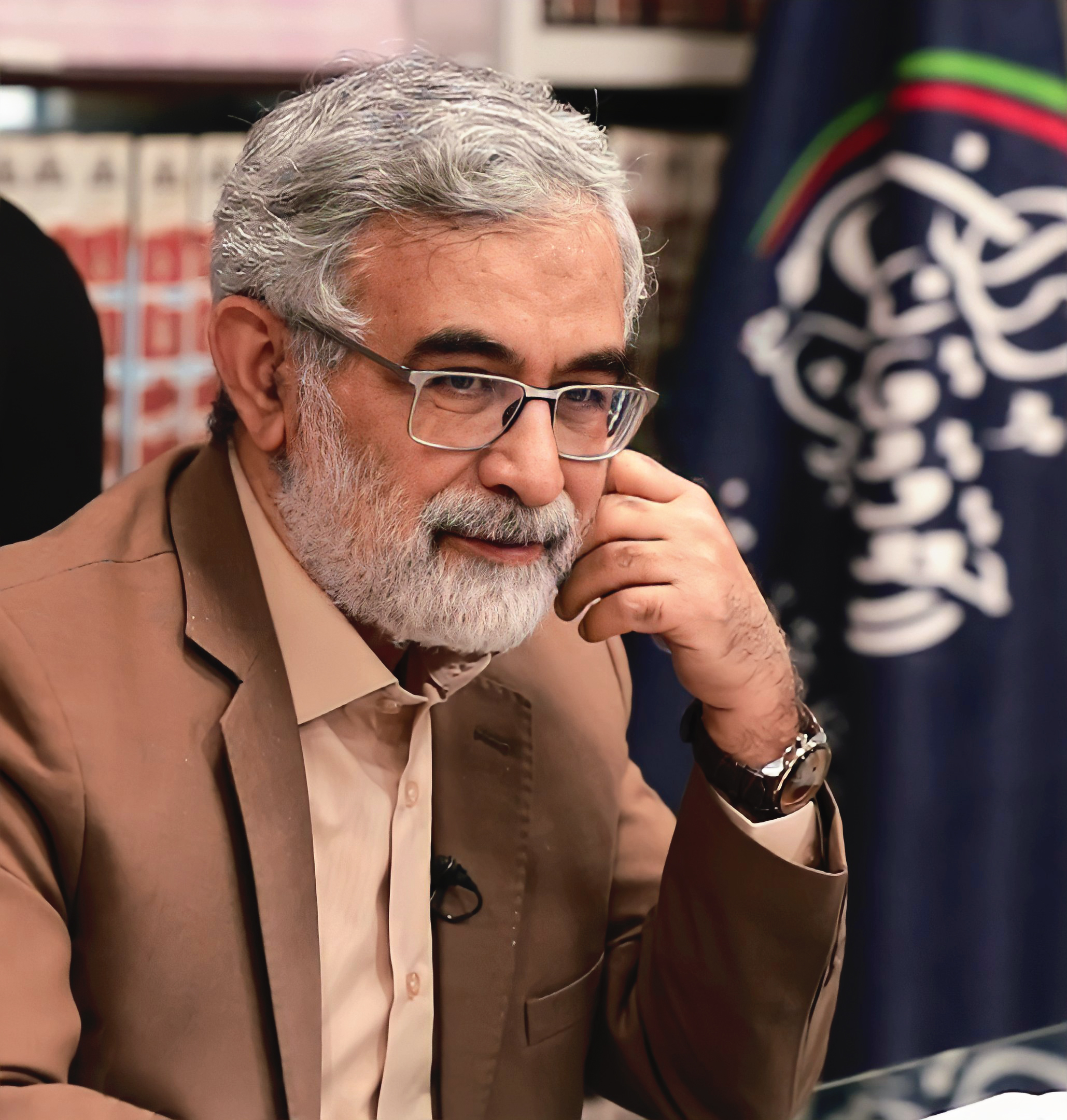
- Elham in 2021

Vice President of Iran for Management and Human Resources Development
- In office 26 December 2012 – 3 August 2013
- President: Mahmoud Ahmadinejad
- Preceded by: Ebrahim Azizi
- Succeeded by: Mohammad Bagher Nobakht (Acting)

Minister of Justice
- In office 13 February 2007 – 3 September 2009; Acting: 28 December 2006 – 13 February 2007
- President: Mahmoud Ahmadinejad
- Preceded by: Jamal Karimi-Rad
- Succeeded by: Morteza Bakhtiari

Head of President's Office
- In office 10 August 2005 – 14 February 2007
- President: Mahmoud Ahmadinejad
- Preceded by: Ali Khatami
- Succeeded by: Abdolreza Sheykholeslami

Spokesperson of the Government of Iran
- In office 11 December 2012 – 3 August 2013
- President: Mahmoud Ahmadinejad
- Preceded by: Shamseddin Hosseini and Mohammad Reza Rahimi
- Succeeded by: Mohammad Bagher Nobakht
- In office 6 August 2005 – 25 August 2009
- President: Mahmoud Ahmadinejad
- Preceded by: Abdollah Ramezanzadeh
- Succeeded by: Shamseddin Hosseini and Mohammad Reza Rahimi

Personal details
- Born: 1959 (age 66–67) Andimeshk, Khuzestan province, Iran
- Party: Front of Islamic Revolution Stability
- Spouse: Fatemeh Rajabi
- Education: Tarbiat Modares University
- Cabinet: 9th Government; 10th Government
- Awards: Order of Merit and Management (2nd class)

Gholam-Hossein Elham (Persian: غلامحسین الهام, born 1959) is an Iranian conservative and principlist politician who held several posts during the term of the former President Mahmoud Ahmedinejad.

== Early life ==
Elham was born in western Iran in 1959. He holds a PhD in criminology from Tarbiat Modares University.

== Career ==
Elham was a member of the Guardian Council from 2003 to 2008 and also held the post of spokesperson of the council. He served as government spokesperson during the first term of the former President Mahmoud Ahmedinejad.

He was appointed minister of justice upon the death of Jamal Karimi-Rad. He was in office until 2009 when Morteza Bakhtiari replaced him in the post. Elham served as Ahmedinejad's representative to the Islamic Republic of Iran Broadcasting's supervisory council.

== Personal life ==
Elham's spouse, Fatemeh Rajabi, is a journalist known for her support for Mahmoud Ahmadinejad and also for her fierce criticism of former-presidents Akbar Rafsanjani and Mohammad Khatami.

== See also ==
- Council for Spreading Mahmoud Ahmadinejad's Thoughts
