= Heydar Moslehi =

Iranian cleric

- حیدر مصلحی
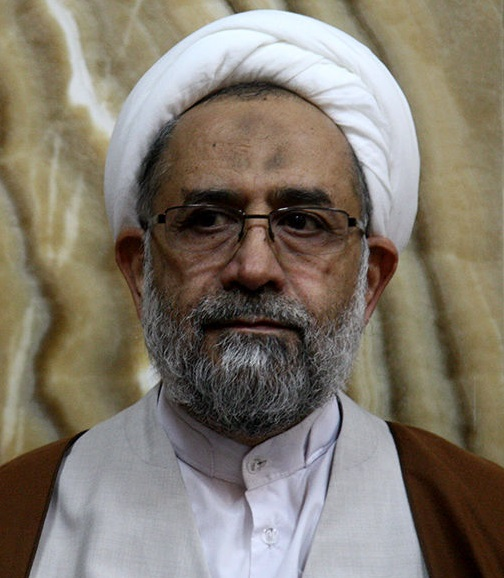
- Heydar Moslehi in 2019

7th Minister of Intelligence
- In office 3 September 2009 – 15 August 2013
- President: Mahmoud Ahmadinejad
- Preceded by: Mahmoud Ahmadinejad (Acting)
- Succeeded by: Mahmoud Alavi

Personal details
- Born: 1957 (age 68–69) Shahreza, Iran
- Party: Coalition of the Pleasant Scent of Servitude

Military service
- Branch/service: Revolutionary Committee; Revolutionary Guards
- Years of service: 1979–2006
- Unit: Ground Force; Basij; Air Force

Heydar Moslehi (Persian: حیدر مصلحی; born 1957 in Shahreza) is an Iranian cleric and politician who served as the minister of intelligence from 2009 to 2013.

== Early life and education ==
Moslehi was born in Shahreza in the Isfahan province, Iran, in 1957. He was a student of Haghani Circle and received a master's degree in International law after studying abroad for several years.

== Career ==
Before Mahmoud Ahmadinejad was elected president in 2005, Moslehi served as the representative of Ayatollah Khamenei to the Basij. Then new president Ahmadinejad appointed him as his adviser for clerical affairs. He was later appointed by Khamenei to be the head of the Organization for Islamic Endowments.

Moslehi was originally appointed minister of intelligence on 5 August 2009. However, he resigned from his position on 17 April 2011 after being asked to resign by Ahmedinejad. The New York Times reported on speculation that Moslehi's resignation was prompted by a dispute with Esfandiar Rahim Mashaei, after Moslehi tried to dismiss an intelligence official.

Moslehi was reinstated in his position by the supreme leader of Iran, Ali Khamenei. Ahmadinejad decided to not hold cabinet meetings in protest of Moslehi's presence. As of April 2011, cabinet meetings were being held without Ahmadinejad, with the vice president of Iran, Mohammad-Reza Rahimi, chairing the meetings. On 27 April, the parliament endorsed Moslehi in his position as minister of intelligence. Moslehi was sanctioned by both the United States (on 29 September 2010) and European Union (in October 2011). The US sanctioned him due to his alleged connections in human rights abuses in the Evin prison. The reason for the EU sanctions is his orders of the arbitrary detentions and persecution of opposition figures in the country.

Political offices
Preceded by Gholam-Hossein Mohseni-Eje'i	Minister of Intelligence; 2009–2013	Succeeded by Mahmoud Alavi
