= Yousef Nouri =

Iranian politician

- یوسف نوری
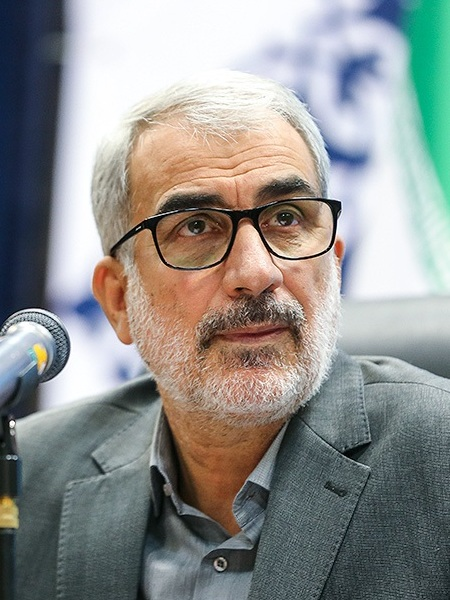
- Nouri in 2021

Governor-general of Mazandaran
- In office 21 April 2024 – 24 November 2024
- President: Ebrahim Raisi
- Preceded by: Mahmoud Hosseinipour
- Succeeded by: Mehdi Younesi Rostami

Minister of Education
- In office 28 November 2021 – 3 April 2023
- President: Ebrahim Raisi
- Preceded by: Mohsen Haji-Mirzaei Alireza Kazemi (Acting)
- Succeeded by: Rezamorad Sahraei

Personal details
- Born: 1961 (age 64–65) Ilam, Iran
- Education: Allameh Tabataba'i University

Yousef Nouri (Persian: یوسف نوری, born 1961) is an Iranian politician who formerly served as the Governor-general of Mazandaran Province. He was the Minister of Education of Iran on Raisi's cabinet. On April 3, 2023, Nouri resigned from his position due to problems of educators and the pressures on him. He was also the chairman of the board of trustees of the Student Organization Of Iran. He was suggested by Ebrahim Raisi, President of Iran, to the Iran parliament.
