= Abdollah Ramezanzadeh =

Iranian academic, writer and politician

- عەبدوڵڵا ڕەمەزانزادە
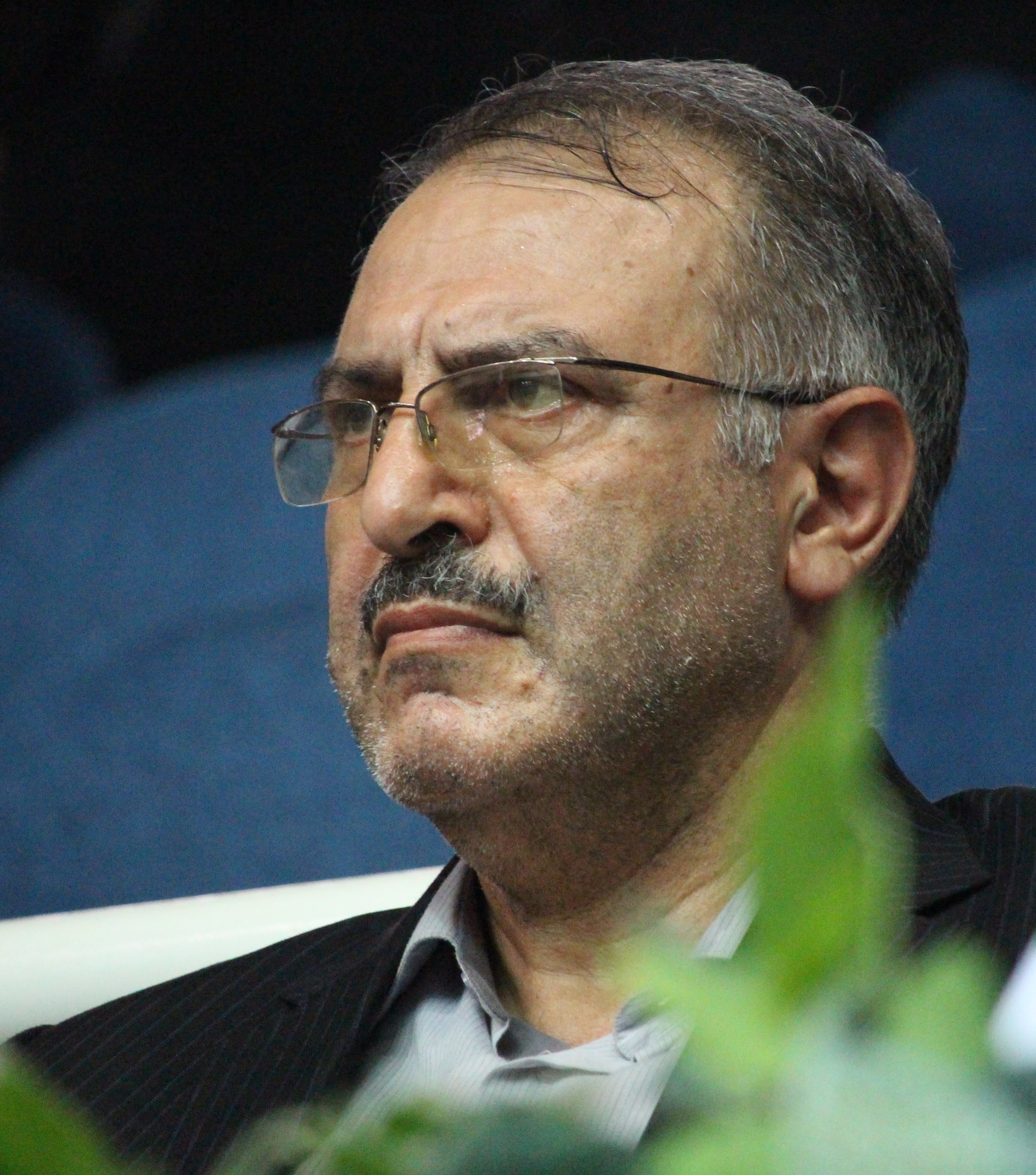

Spokesperson of the Government of Iran
- In office 19 December 2001 – 3 August 2005
- President: Mohammad Khatami
- Preceded by: Ata'ollah Mohajerani
- Succeeded by: Gholam Hossein Elham

Governor of Kurdistan Province
- In office 14 September 1997 – 2 January 2001
- President: Mohammad Khatami
- Preceded by: Mohammad Reza Rahimi
- Succeeded by: Asadollah Razani

Personal details
- Born: 23 August 1954 (age 72) Bijar, Iran
- Party: Islamic Iran Participation Front
- Children: Mohammad, Ahmad
- Education: Katholieke Universiteit Leuven

Abdollah Ramezanzadeh (Kurdish: عەبدوڵڵا ڕەمەزانزادە; Persian: عبدالله رمضان‌زاده), also called Ramazanzadeh, is an Iranian academic, writer and politician.

An ethnic Kurdish, he is the former spokesman and secretary of the government of the Islamic Republic of Iran during the presidency of Mohammad Khatami.

Ramezanzadeh is an assistant professor in faculty of Law and Political Science of University of Tehran, and a member of Islamic Iran Participation Front. He was the governor of the Kurdistan province of Iran from 1997 to 2001.

In 1996, Ramezanzadeh got his PhD from Katholieke Universiteit Leuven, Belgium. His thesis entitles "Internal and international dynamics of ethnic conflict: the case of Iran".

== Arrest ==
Ramezanzadeh was arrested a few hours after the 2009 disputed presidential election. Shortly before his arrest, Ramezanzadeh released a historic speech posted on the opposition web sites and distributed throughout Iran and all over the world. He was in solitary confinement for 4 months and sentenced to 6 years jail. He is among the Iranian activists for the ethnic groups rights and the head of the Iranian Kurdish Reformists.

Party political offices
Preceded by Mohsen Mirdamadi	Deputy Secretary-General of Islamic Iran Participation Front; 2006–present	Incumbent
