= Ali Bahadori Jahromi =

Iranian jurist and politician

- علی بهادری جهرمی
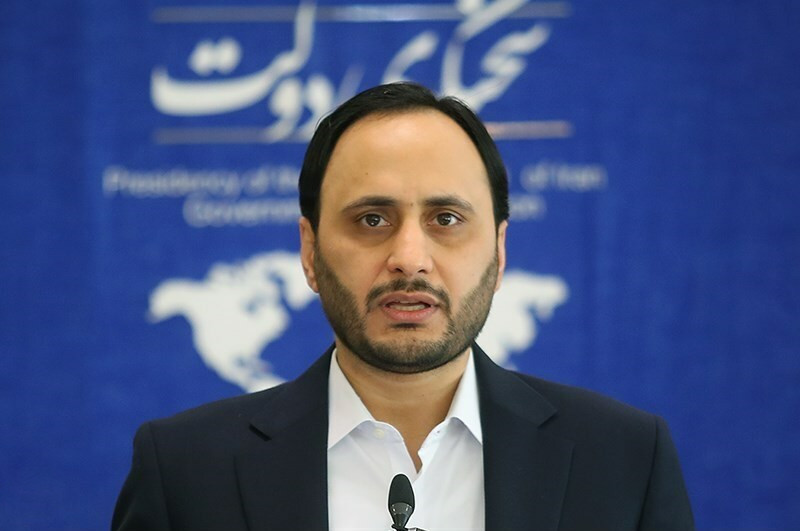
- Bahadori Jahromi in 2023

Secretary of the Government Board of Iran
- In office 13 March 2022 – 12 August 2024
- President: Ebrahim Raisi; Mohammad Mokhber (acting)
- Preceded by: Hossein Simaee Sarraf
- Succeeded by: Kamel Taghavinejad

Spokesperson of the Government of Iran
- In office 14 November 2021 – 28 July 2024
- President: Ebrahim Raisi; Mohammad Mokhber (acting)
- Preceded by: Ali Rabii
- Succeeded by: Fatemeh Mohajerani

Personal details
- Born: 11 September 1985 (age 39); Golpayegan County, Isfahan Province
- Political party: Independent

Ali Bahadori Jahromi (born 11 September 1985) is an Iranian jurist and politician who served as the former spokesperson of the Iranian Government and served as head of the Government Information Council from 14 November 2021 to 3 December 2022. Also he was the secretary of the government board in the 13th government from 2022 to 2024.
