= Jamal Karimi-Rad =

Iranian politician

- جمال کریمی راد

29th Minister of Justice of the Islamic Republic of Iran
- In office 2005–2006
- Preceded by: Esmail Shooshtari
- Succeeded by: Gholam-Hossein Elham

Personal details
- Born: 1956 Qazvin, Iran
- Died: 28 December 2006 (aged 50) Salafjegan, Iran
- Resting place: Imamzadeh Hossein, Qazvin
- Education: University of Tehran, University of Judicial Sciences and Administrative Services

Jamal Karimi-Rad (1956 – 28 December 2006) (Persian: جمال کریمی راد) was the Minister of Justice of the Islamic Republic of Iran.

== Early life ==
Rad was born in 1956.

== Death ==
He was killed in a car accident near Salafjegan on 28 December 2006. Gholam-Hossein Elham became the acting justice minister after this event.

== See also ==
- Esmail Shooshtari
- Ghorbanali Dorri-Najafabadi
- Mohammad Ismaeil Shooshtari

Political offices
Preceded by Esmail Shooshtari	Minister of Justice of Iran; 2005-2006	Succeeded by Gholam-Hossein Elham
