= Mahmoud Alavi =

Iranian Ayatollah

Ayatollah; Seyyed; Mahmoud Alavi
- محمود علوی
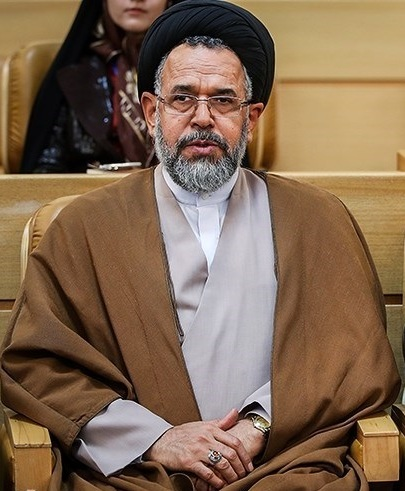
- Alavi in 2016

Special Aide to the President of Iran Head of the Council of Ethnic and Religious Affairs
- Incumbent
- Assumed office 21 November 2024
- President: Masoud Pezeshkian
- Supreme Leader: Ali Khamenei; Mojtaba Khamenei
- Preceded by: Abdolsalam Karimi as Advisor in the Affairs of Ethnic and Religious Minorities

Minister of Intelligence
- In office 15 August 2013 – 25 August 2021
- President: Hassan Rouhani
- Supreme Leader: Ali Khamenei
- Preceded by: Heydar Moslehi
- Succeeded by: Esmaeil Khatib

Member of the Assembly of Experts
- In office 13 June 2009 – 20 May 2024
- Constituency: Tehran province
- Majority: 1,706,855 (37.92%)

Head of the Iranian Army Ideological−Political Organization
- In office 15 August 2000 – 19 July 2009
- President: Mohammad Khatami; Mahmoud Ahmadinejad
- Supreme Leader: Ali Khamenei
- Preceded by: Mahmoud Qochani
- Succeeded by: Mohammad Ali Ale-Hashem

Member of the Parliament of Iran
- In office 28 May 1992 – 27 May 2000
- Constituency: Lamerd
- Majority: 45,876 (63%)
- In office 17 September 1981 – 27 May 1988
- Constituency: Larestan
- Majority: 39,006 (62%)

Personal details
- Born: 24 April 1954 (age 72) Lamerd, Fars province, Imperial State of Iran
- Party: Resistance Front of Islamic Iran
- Children: Mohsen, Monireh
- Education: Ferdowsi University
- Website: mahmoudalavi.com

Military service
- Allegiance: Iran
- Branch/service: Islamic Republic of Iran Army
- Years of service: 2000–2009
- Battles/wars: War in Afghanistan (2001–2021); 2001 uprising in Herat; Insurgency in Sistan and Balochistan

Mahmoud Alavi (Persian: محمود علوی; born 24 April 1954) is an Iranian principlist politician who currently serves as the Special Aide to the President of Iran since 2024. He was formerly minister of intelligence in the first and second governments of Hassan Rouhani.

== Early life ==
Alavi was born in Lamerd, Fars province, in 1954. He holds a PhD in Islamic jurisprudence and law from Ferdowsi University in Mashhad.

== Career ==
Alavi is a cleric and a scholar of Islamic jurisprudence. He holds the religious rank of Ayatollah. He is the former head of the political and ideological body of the Iranian Army to which he was appointed by Supreme Leader Ali Khamenei. Alavi served in the post from 2000 to August 2009. In addition, Alavi was Khamenei's special representative in the army until August 2009. He also assumed the post of deputy defense minister.

He served at the Majlis as Tehran representative for four terms during the terms of former presidents Rafsanjani and Khatami. He ran for office in the list of Resistance Front of the Islamic Revolution led by Mohsen Rezaee in the 2012 election. However, Alavi's nomination was rejected by the Guardian Council on the grounds that he did not have "practical commitment to Islam and the regime."

He is a former member of the Assembly of Experts. He served as Hassan Rouhani's liaison officer for the city of Qom and the institutions there in the 2013 presidential elections. Alavi was designated as intelligence minister by Rouhani on 4 August 2013. He was approved for the post on 15 August by the Majlis with 227 Yes votes.

=== Views ===
Ali Reza Eshraghi of the University of North Carolina at Chapel Hill argues that Alavi is a principalist politician in the Iranian political arena. He is, therefore, a conservative figure and close to Mohsen Rezaei. Alavi publicly criticized Ali Akbar Rafsanjani's disqualification for the 2013 presidential election soon after the election.

=== Human rights violations ===
As Minister of Intelligence (July 2013 – August 2021) he perpetrated 6 human rights violations:

- He was responsible for the death of Saro Ghahremani, arrested during the January 2018 protests, and the arrest and coerced televised confession of Mohammad Ghahremani, Saro Ghahremani's father.
- He was responsible for the detention, torture and killing of protesters during the 2017-2018 protests, as well as the suspicious deaths of protesters in the custody of Intelligence Ministry agents.

The 2017–2018 nationwide protests were large-scale demonstrations to protest against inflation and corruption, which began on 28 December 2017 in Mashhad and several cities in Khorasan province and quickly spread across Iran, including with harsher anti-government slogans. The crackdown on protesters resulted in the deaths of at least 25 protesters and several detainees.

- He has been responsible for the pressure and mass detention of Baha'i citizens for their religious beliefs, including 17 Baha'i citizens who were arrested in three cities of Isfahan, Shiraz and Karaj between September and October 2018.
- He was responsible for the arrest and torture of trade union activists, including Esmail Bakhshi and Sepideh Gholian, and the suppression of peaceful protests by sugar cane workers in Haft Tappeh.
- He was responsible for the detention of civil society activists and the persecution and harassment of their families in 2018 to prevent them from speaking to the press.
- He was responsible for the killing and detention of protesters during the November 2019 protests, as well as threatening and pressuring their families to refrain from providing information to the press and holding memorial services.

Political offices
Preceded by Heydar Moslehi	Minister of Intelligence and National Security; 15 August 2013–25 August 2021	Succeeded by Esmaeil Khatib
