= Ehsan Khandozi =

Iranian economist and politician (born 1980)

Seyyed Ehzan Khandozi
- احسان خاندوزی
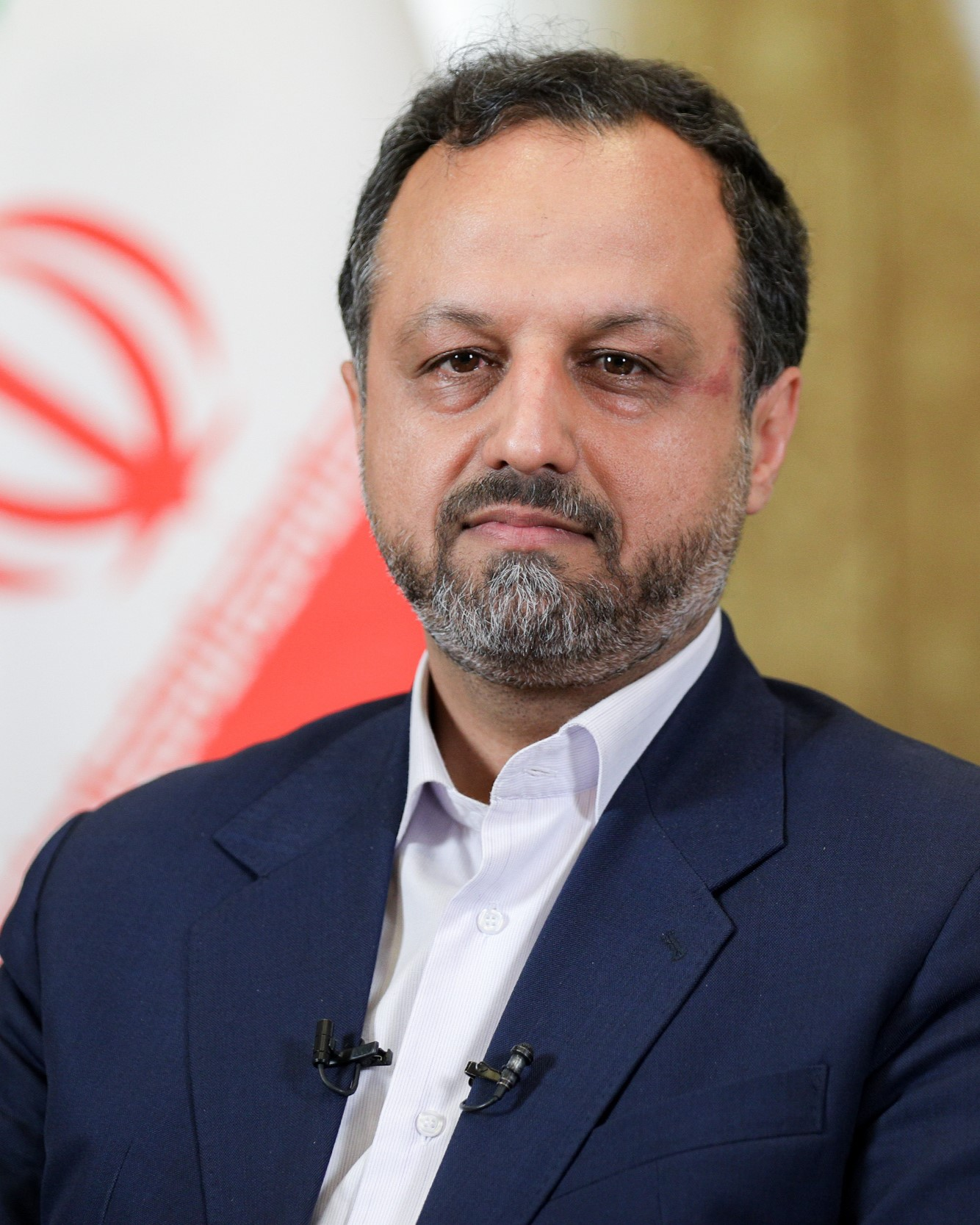
- Khandozi in 2024

Minister of Economic Affairs and Finance
- In office 25 August 2021 – 21 August 2024
- President: Ebrahim Raisi; Mohammad Mokhber (acting)
- Preceded by: Farhad Dejpasand
- Succeeded by: Abdolnaser Hemmati

Economical Spokesperson of the Government of Iran
- In office 26 October 2021 – 28 July 2024
- President: Ebrahim Raisi; Mohammad Mokhber (acting)
- Preceded by: Office established

Member of the Parliament of Iran
- In office 27 May 2020 – 25 August 2021
- Constituency: Tehran, Rey, Shemiranat, Eslamshahr and Pardis
- Majority: 801,696 (43.52%)

Personal details
- Born: 1980 (age 45–46) Gorgan, Iran
- Party: Unknown
- Other political affiliations: Coalition Council of Islamic Revolution Forces
- Education: Imam Sadiq University; Islamic Azad University

Ehsan Khandozi (Persian: سید احسان خاندوزی; born 1980) is an Iranian economist and politician who served as the minister of economic and financial affairs from 2021 to 2024.

== Early life and education ==
Hailing from a religious family, Khandozi was born in Gorgan in 1980. Beginning in 1998, he studied Islamic sciences and economics at Imam Sadiq University. He has a Ph.D. in economics which he obtained from Islamic Azad University.

== Career ==
Khandozi worked as the head of the Basij. In 2013 he was made the economy director of the Parliamentary Research Center. From 2014 he began to work at Allameh Tabataba'i University. He was elected to the Majlis in 2020 representing Tehran becoming a member of the 11th term and served there in different commissions related to economy. He was nominated as the minister of economic and financial affairs to the cabinet of Iranian President Ebrahim Raisi and was confirmed by the Majlis on 25 August 2021. He received 254 votes in favor.

=== Work ===
Khandozi has published various articles and three books, including A just city: An introduction to the theory of economic justice in the Quran.
