= Esmail Shooshtari =

Iranian politician (1949–2024)

- محمداسماعیل شوشتری
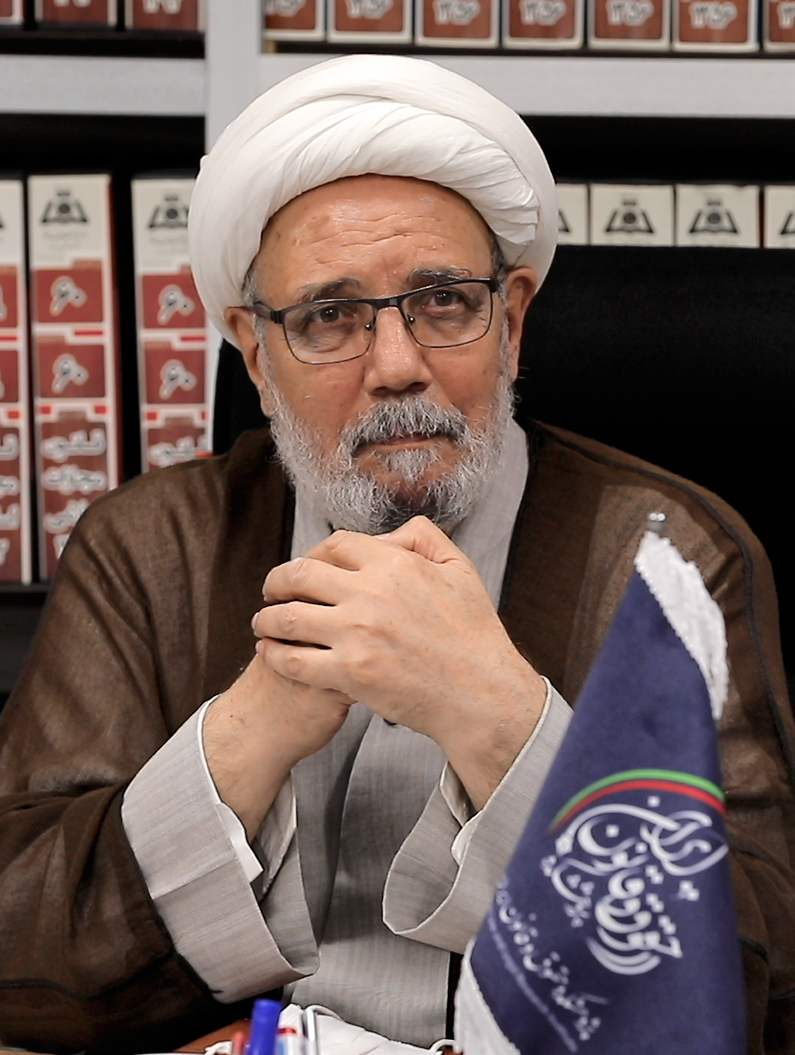
- Shooshtari in 2021

Minister of Justice
- In office 29 August 1989 – 24 August 2005
- President: Akbar Hashemi Rafsanjani; Mohammad Khatami
- Preceded by: Hassan Habibi
- Succeeded by: Jamal Karimi-Rad

Member of the Parliament of Iran
- In office 1981 – 26 May 1988
- Constituency: Quchan and Faruj

Personal details
- Born: 1949 Quchan, Khorasan province, Iran
- Died: 21 November 2024 (aged 74–75)
- Party: Executives of Construction Party

Mohammad Esmail Shooshtari (Persian: محمداسماعیل شوشتری; 1949 – 21 November 2024) was an Iranian politician who was the Minister of Justice of the Islamic Republic of Iran from 1989 to 2005.

== Life and career ==
Born in Quchan, he was a member of the Islamic Consultative Assembly. He was a member of a committee that investigated the death of Zahra Kazemi. Shooshtari died on 21 November 2024.

== See also ==
- Jamal Karimi-Rad

== References and notes ==
Political offices
Preceded by Hassan Habibi	Minister of Justice of Iran; 1989–2005	Succeeded by Jamal Karimi-Rad
Preceded by Majid Ansari	President of prisons organization of Iran; 1988–1989	Succeeded by Asadollah Lajevardi
