= Mohammad Bagher Nobakht =

Iranian politician and economist

- محمد باقر نوبخت
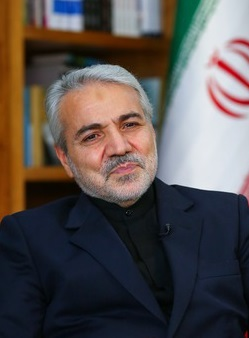
- Nobakht in 2020

Vice President of Iran Head of Plan and Budget Organization
- In office 2 August 2016 – 11 August 2021
- President: Hassan Rouhani
- Preceded by: Office reestablished
- Succeeded by: Masoud Mir Kazemi

Vice President of Iran Head of Management and Planning Organization
- In office 10 November 2014 – 1 August 2016
- President: Hassan Rouhani
- Preceded by: Office reestablished Vacant after Amir-Mansour Borgheie
- Succeeded by: Office abolished

Vice President of Iran for Supervision and Strategic Affairs and Acting for Management and Human Resources Development
- In office 1 September 2013 – 10 November 2014
- President: Hassan Rouhani
- Preceded by: Behrouz Moradi (Supervision and Strategic Affairs); Gholam-Hossein Elham (Management and Human Resources Development)
- Succeeded by: Offices abolished

Spokesperson of the Government of Iran
- In office 28 August 2013 – 1 August 2018
- President: Hassan Rouhani
- Preceded by: Gholam Hossein Elham
- Succeeded by: Ali Rabiei

Member of Parliament of Iran
- In office 28 May 1988 – 28 May 2004
- Constituency: Rasht
- Majority: 285,536 (25.9%)

Personal details
- Born: Mohammad Bagher Nobakht Haghighi; 13 December 1950 (age 75) Rasht, Imperial State of Iran
- Party: Moderation and Development Party
- Occupation: Economist, politician

Mohammad Bagher Nobakht Haghighi (Persian: محمد باقر نوبخت حقیقی; born 13 December 1950 in Rasht, Iran) is an Iranian politician and economist. He was Hassan Rouhani's advisor for Supervision and Strategic Affairs and also was the Head of Plan and Budget Organization from 2016 to 2021. He was Spokesman of the Government from 2013 to 2018. He is also the former Head of Management and Planning Organization and secretary-general of the Moderation and Development Party.

He was a representative of Rasht in the Islamic Consultative Assembly for four consecutive terms. He was the spokesman for Rouhani's 2013 presidential election and also Deputy of Economic Research Department at the Center for Strategic Research, a think tank led by Rouhani.

Following Rouhani's election as president, Nobakht was appointed the president's liaison to the legislative branch led by Ali Ardashir Larijani, with the mandate to "establish communication and moderation" between the two branches of government; Larijani appointed Mohammad-Reza Bahonar as Nobakht's counterpart. He was appointed as advisor for Supervision and Strategic Affairs on 5 August 2013 by Rouhani. On 11 August 2013, he was appointed vice president for planning and strategic supervision.

== See also ==
- Hossein Samsami

Party political offices
New title Party established	Secretary-General of the Moderation and Development Party; 1999–present	Incumbent
