= Student Organization of Iran =

Student Organization of Iran سازمان دانش آموزی

History
- Founded: 1999 May 10

Leadership
- Chairman of the Board of Trustees: Alireza Kazemi
- Chairman: Sadegh Hosseinzadeh Maleki

Website
- http://www.irsto.ir

The Student Organization of Iran (Persian: سازمان دانش آموزی) is a non-governmental organization affiliated with the Ministry of Education of Iran. It provides social education.

== History ==
The Iranian Scout Organization was established in 1925, considering the activities in this field. After the revolution, it was dissolved in mid-1985 and the Youth and Adolescents Organization was formed. The renamed organization started its activities in 1999.
