= Ali Rabii =

Iranian politician

Ali Rabiei
- علی ربیعی
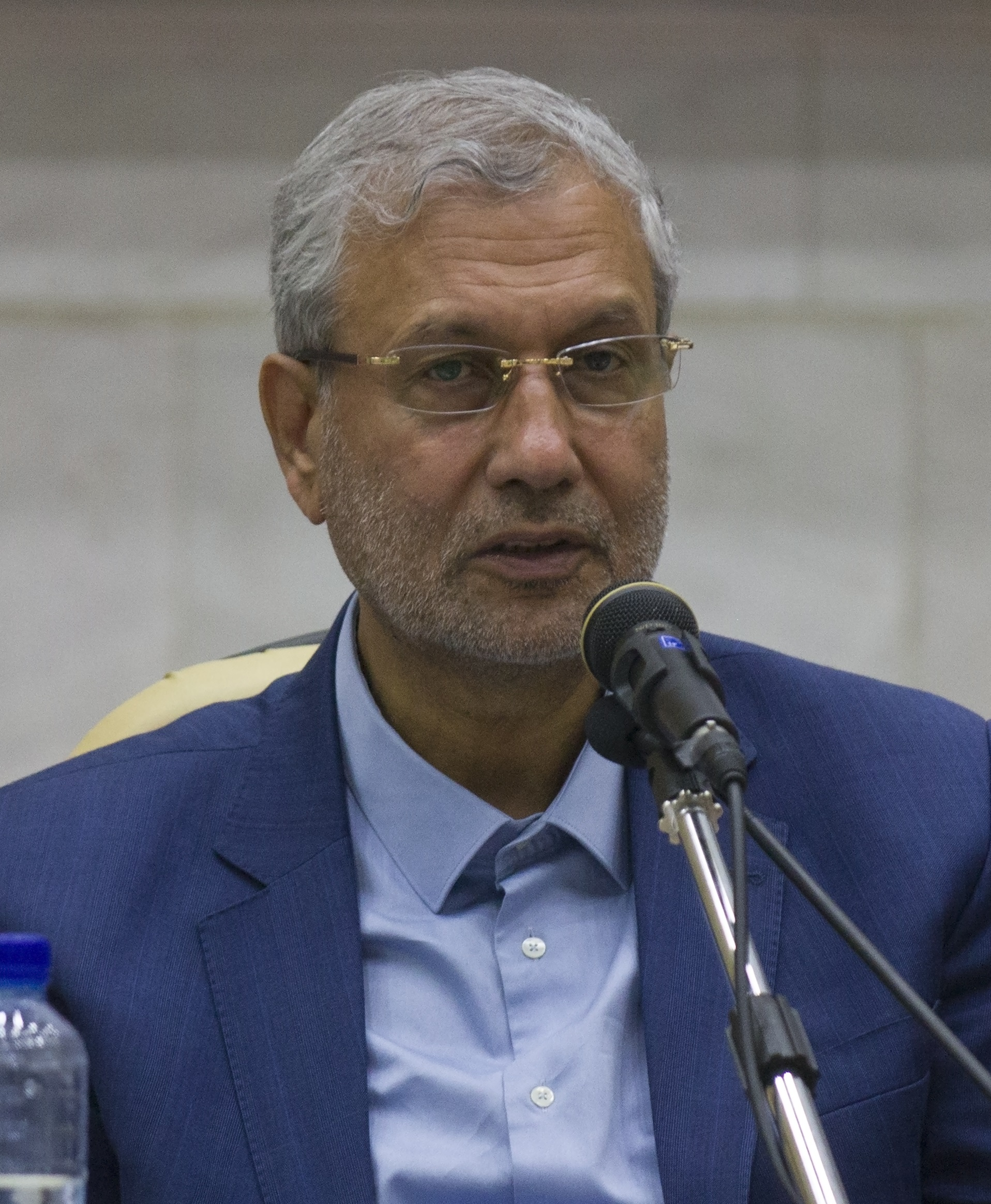

Aide to the President of Iran for Social Affairs
- Incumbent
- Assumed office 5 October 2024
- President: Masoud Pezeshkian

Head of Center for Strategic Studies
- In office 29 April 2021 – 23 October 2021
- President: Hassan Rouhani
- Preceded by: Hesamodin Ashna
- Succeeded by: Mohammad Sadegh Khayatian

Spokesperson of the Government of Iran
- In office 30 May 2019 – 3 August 2021
- President: Hassan Rouhani
- Preceded by: Mohammad Bagher Nobakht
- Succeeded by: Ali Bahadori Jahromi

Minister of Cooperatives, Labour and Social Welfare
- In office 15 August 2013 – 8 August 2018
- President: Hassan Rouhani
- Preceded by: Asadollah Abbasi
- Succeeded by: Mohammad Shariatmadari

Personal details
- Born: 6 December 1955 (age 70) Tehran, Imperial State of Iran
- Party: Islamic Labour Party
- Spouse: Narges Hosseinzadeh (m. 1981; died 2007)
- Children: 4
- Education: University of Tehran
- Website: official website

Ali Rabiei (Persian: علی ربیعی, born 6 December 1955), also known by his nickname, Ebad, is an Iranian politician and former intelligence officer. He is currently Aide to the President of Iran for Social Affairs to President Masoud Pezeshkian since 2024.

He served as the Minister of Labor from 2013 to 2018. He was an adviser to the former President Mohammad Khatami from 1999 to 2005. On 4 August 2013, he was nominated as Minister of Labor to the cabinet by then-President Hassan Rouhani. He is also a Payame Noor University professor.

== Early life and education ==
Ali Rabei was born on 6 December 1955 in Javadieh, Tehran. He graduated from the University of Tehran with a degree in state management in the 1970s and became a technician at the General Motors factory in Tehran. He was arrested by SAVAK in a labor strike in Ekbatan.

== Political career ==
Following the Iranian Revolution, Rabei became a member of the Islamic Republican Party and its labor branch head. Then, Prime Minister Mehdi Bazargan appointed him as a member of labor law codification, a membership he held until the present. He is one of the closest people to Mohammad Khatami. After Khatami's election, Rabei was one of his advisors for social affairs. He was also Khatami's representative at the Ministry of Intelligence in 2001. He was also the head of the Presidential Secretariat and executive committee and Homeland Security Committee Propaganda of Supreme National Security Council under Hassan Rouhani from 2002 to 2005. After the election of Rouhani as president, he was nominated for the Minister of Labor. He was confirmed by the parliament on 15 August 2013.

Rabii was among hundreds of academic faculty who signed a letter condemning the government's crackdown of the 2025–2026 Iranian protests, and failure to prevent a future attack on Iran by the United States and Israel in response to the crackdown.

== Works ==
- "Sociological changes in value in Iran", 1993
- "Sociology, political corruption in the third world countries", 1996
- "National Security Studies", 1997
- "The crux of the civil administration", 1998
- "Knowledge management in organizations", 2001
- "Knowledge management processes and procedures", 2008
- "Risk and Crisis Management", 2013

Political offices
| Preceded by Asadollah Abbasi | Minister of Labour; 2013–2018 | Succeeded by Mohammad Shariatmadari |
