= Esmaeil Khatib =

Iranian cleric and politician (1961–2026)

- اسماعیل خطیب
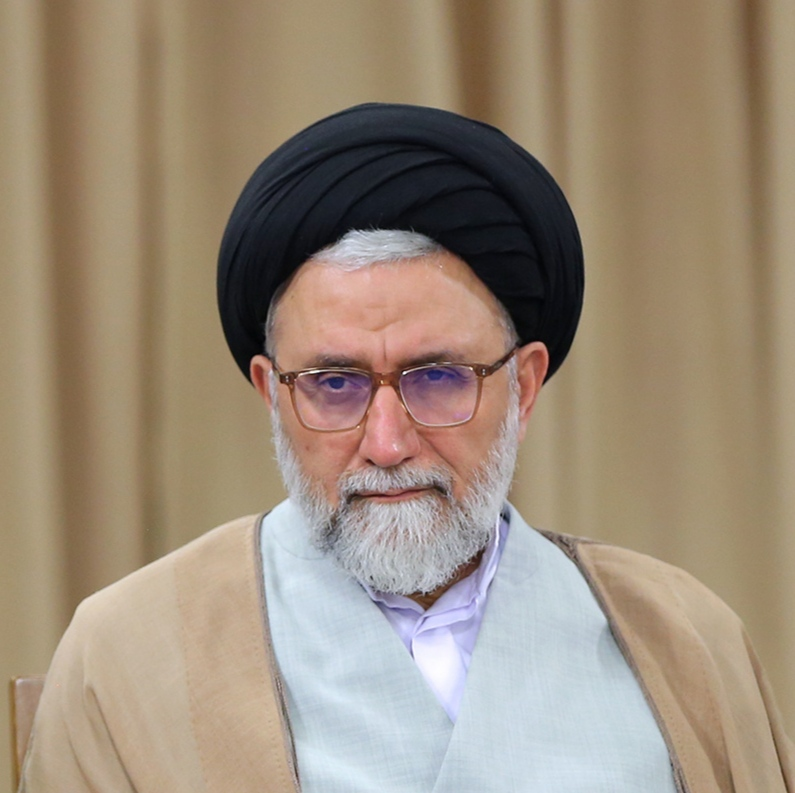
- Khatib in 2024

Minister of Intelligence
- In office 25 August 2021 – 18 March 2026
- President: Ebrahim Raisi; Mohammad Mokhber (acting); Masoud Pezeshkian
- Supreme Leader: Ali Khamenei; Mojtaba Khamenei (Note: Between Ali Khamenei's death on 28 February and Mojtaba Khamenei's election on 8 March, an interim leadership council composed of Pezeshkian, Chief Justice Gholam-Hossein Mohseni-Eje'i, and Alireza Arafi was tasked with handing the duties of the supreme leader.)
- Preceded by: Mahmoud Alavi
- Succeeded by: Undeclared (acting)

Special Assistant to the Custodian of Astan Quds Razavi
- In office 2019–2021
- President: Hassan Rouhani
- Supreme Leader: Ali Khamenei
- Preceded by: Morteza Bakhtiari
- Succeeded by: ?

Director General of Security of Astan Quds Razavi
- In office 2019–2021
- President: Hassan Rouhani
- Supreme Leader: Ali Khamenei
- Preceded by: Jafar Sabaghian
- Succeeded by: ?

Head of the Judiciary's Protection and Intelligence Center
- In office 2012–2019
- President: Mahmoud Ahmadinejad; Hassan Rouhani
- Supreme Leader: Ali Khamenei
- Preceded by: Ali Asghar Jahangir
- Succeeded by: Ali Abdollahi

Personal details
- Born: 1 July 1961 Qaen, Khorasan province, Pahlavi Iran
- Died: 18 March 2026 (aged 64) Tehran, Iran
- Cause of death: Assassination by airstrike
- Occupation: Politician; Government Minister

Military service
- Allegiance: Iran
- Branch/service: Islamic Revolutionary Guard Corps
- Years of service: 1980–1991
- Unit: Intelligence
- Battles/wars: Iran–Iraq War

Esmaeil Khatib (1 July 1961 – 18 March 2026) was an Iranian cleric and politician who served as the Minister of Intelligence from August 2021 until his assassination in March 2026 during the 2026 Iran war by an Israeli airstrike. He was the eighth official to hold the post.

== Early life and education ==
Khatib was born in Qaen, Khorasan, in 1961. He studied Islamic jurisprudence in Qom. He was a pupil of people such as Ali Khamenei, Mohammad Fazel Lankarani, Naser Makarem Shirazi, and Mojtaba Tehrani.

== Career ==
From 1991, Khatib was responsible for intelligence in the province of Qom.

Khatib held the title of Hujjat al-Islam, which translates as "proof of Islam" or "authority on Islam". Previous posts of Khatib included the head of the Information Protection Center of the Judiciary and the head of Astan Quds Razavi Security. He also worked in the Office of the Supreme Leader, Ali Khamenei, as Iran's chief warden, and in the Islamic Revolutionary Guard Corps (IRGC) intelligence department and the Ministry of Intelligence.

In 1985, Khatib was assigned to the intelligence unit of the IRGC by Mohsen Rezaei, the first commander-in-chief of the corps. Khatib was in the post until 1991. During the tenure of Ali Fallahian as Minister of Intelligence, Khatib was appointed head of the ministry's regional branch in Qom in 1999. Khatib was appointed chief warden in the Office of Supreme Leader in 2010.

=== Minister of Intelligence ===
Khatib was nominated as the minister of intelligence in the cabinet of president Ebrahim Raisi and was confirmed by the Majlis on 25 August 2021. He received 222 votes in favor. Khatib replaced Mahmoud Alavi in the post.

During the summer of 2023, senior security and intelligence officials, including Khatib, met in Mashhad to create a coordinated strategy to counter the "coherent and extensive" planning by the West to undermine national stability and purpose.

In June 2025, Iranian state media reported that Iranian intelligence agencies had obtained a large set of sensitive Israeli documents. Khatib said the files included material on Israel’s nuclear facilities, its relations with the United States, Europe, and other countries, as well as its defensive capabilities. He described the collection as a “treasure trove” that would strengthen Iran’s offensive capabilities and said the documents would be made public soon. Israel did not comment on the claims.

=== Views ===
Khatib was one of Ali Khamenei's close allies and was also a supporter of Ayatollah Ruhollah Khomeini. He had close connections with other significant religious figures in Iran, mostly his teachers.

== Assassination ==
Khatib was targeted in overnight Israeli airstrikes on 17–18 March 2026 and was killed, according to Israeli Defense Minister Israel Katz and the Israel Defense Forces. Iranian president Masoud Pezeshkian confirmed Khatib's death on 18 March 2026.

== See also ==
- List of Iranian officials killed during the 2026 Iran war

== Notes ==
Legal offices
Preceded by Ali Asghar Jahangir	Head of the Judiciary's Protection and Intelligence Center; 2012–2019	Succeeded by Ali Abdollahi
Shia Islam titles
Preceded by Jafar Sabaghian	Director General of Security of Astan Quds Razavi; 2019–2021	Succeeded by ?
Preceded by Morteza Bakhtiari	Special Assistant to the Custodian of Astan Quds Razavi; 2019–2021	Succeeded by ?
Political offices
Preceded by Mahmoud Alavi	Minister of Intelligence; 25 August 2021–18 March 2026	Succeeded by ? Acting
