= Morteza Bakhtiari =

Iranian politician (born 1952)

Seyyed Morteza Bakhtiari
- مرتضی بختیاری
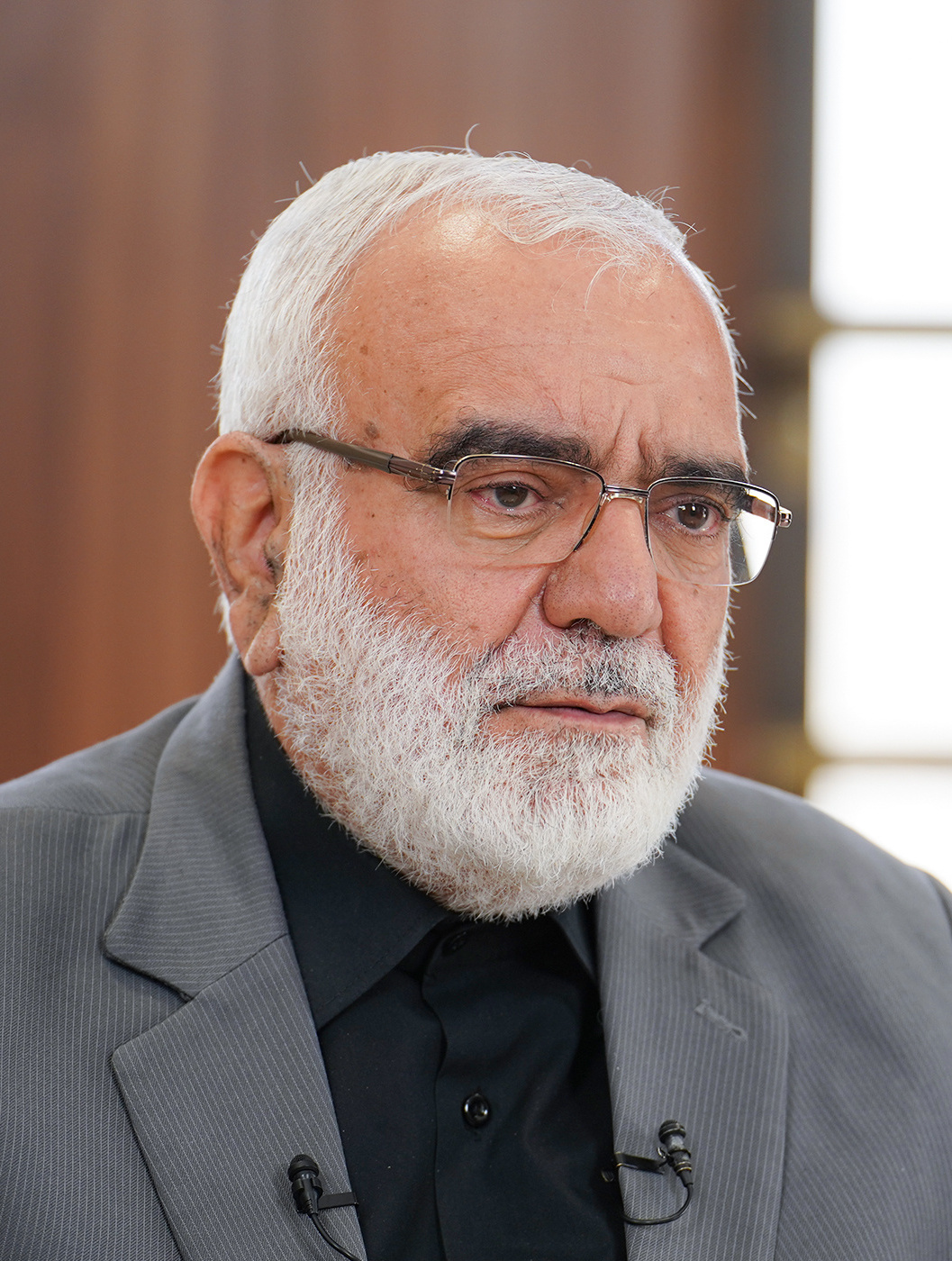
- Bakhtiari in 2024

Head of the Imam Khomeini Relief Foundation
- Incumbent
- Assumed office 22 July 2019
- Appointed by: Ali Khamenei
- Preceded by: Parviz Fattah

Deputy Custodian of Astan Quds Razavi
- In office 22 May 2016 – 1 January 2019
- Appointed by: Ebrahim Raisi
- Preceded by: Mehdi Azizian
- Succeeded by: Reza Fatemi Amin

Minister of Justice
- In office 3 September 2009 – 15 August 2013
- President: Mahmoud Ahmedinejad
- Preceded by: Gholam Hossein Elham
- Succeeded by: Mostafa Pourmohammadi

Governor of Isfahan
- In office 8 October 2005 – 3 September 2009
- President: Mahmoud Ahmedinejad
- Preceded by: Mahmoud Hosseini
- Succeeded by: Alireza Zaker

Personal details
- Born: 1952 (age 73–74) Mashhad, Iran

Morteza Bakhtiari (Persian: سید مرتضی بختیاری) (born 1952) is an Iranian politician who served as Minister of Justice from 2009 to 2013.

== Early life ==
Bakhtiari was born in Mashhad in 1952.

== Career ==
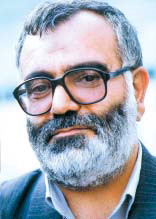
Bakhtiari in 2002.

Bakhtiari served as the director of the state prisons organization of Iran from 4 March 1999 to June 2004. He was named as the head of the justice department of the Khorasan Province in Mashhad in June 2004, replacing Ali Akbar Yasaqi. Then he began to serve as the governor of Isfahan in October 2005. He was approved by the Majlis as justice minister to the cabinet led by president Mahmoud Ahmedinejad on 3 September 2009 and replaced Gholam Hossein Elham as justice minister. Bakhtiari won 225 votes in favor and 36 votes against. 23 members of the Majlis did not attend the session.

Bakhtiari was one of seven members of the committee that was tasked with carrying out the presidential elections held in June 2013. His term as justice minister ended on 15 August 2013 and he was replaced by Mostafa Pourmohammadi.

=== Sanctions ===
The European Union put sanctions on Bakhtiari and another two ministers in the form of a visa ban and asset freeze in October 2011 due to alleged human rights abuses. The Treasury of the United Kingdom also put him among asset freeze targets in October 2011 due to the same reason.
