= Mohsen Haji-Mirzaei =

Iranian government official

- محسن حاجی‌میرزایی
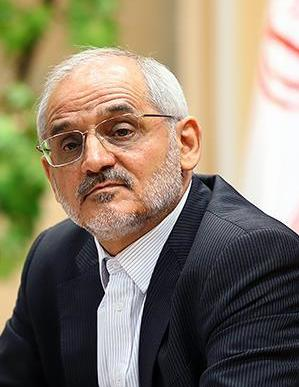
- Haji-Mirzaei in 2019

Head of President's Office
- Incumbent
- Assumed office 28 July 2024
- President: Masoud Pezeshkian
- Preceded by: Gholam-Hossein Esmaeili

Minister of Education
- In office 3 September 2019 – 26 August 2021
- President: Hassan Rouhani
- Preceded by: Mohammad Bathaei
- Succeeded by: Alireza Kazemi (Acting) Yousef Nouri

Personal details
- Born: 1959 (age 66–67) Qom, Iran
- Education: Tehran University; Azad Islamic University

Mohsen Haji-Mirzaei (Persian: محسن حاجی‌میرزایی, born 1959) is an Iranian politician and has serves as the chief of staff of the president of Iran since 28 July 2024. He is also Iran's former Minister of Education. Mirzaei was nominated by Hassan Rouhani to succeed Mohammad Bathaei. He received a majority vote from the Islamic Consultative Assembly in September 2019.

== Life ==
Mirzaei earned a Bachelor's degree in Social Sciences from the University of Tehran, a Master's degree in Management from the State Management Center and a Doctorate in Sociology from the Islamic Azad University, Tehran.

== Advisors ==
- Majid Ghadami
- Ali Askari
- Reza Madadi
- Mohammadmehdi Nooripour
- Abdorasoul Emadi
