= Farzaneh Ansari =

Iranian politician and environmentalist

- فرزانه انصاری

Vice President of Iran Iran National Standards Organization
- Incumbent
- Assumed office 8 December 2024
- President: Masoud Pezeshkian
- Preceded by: Mahdi Eslampanah

Personal details
- Born: Ahvaz, Iran
- Education: Ahvaz Jundishapur University of Medical Sciences; University of Tehran
- Occupation: Politician, Nutrition, Agricultural Engineering
- Profession: PhD in Agricultural Engineering

Farzaneh Ansari (Persian: فرزانه انصاری) is an Iranian politician, Nutrition and Agricultural engineering who is currently Vice president of Iran and Head of Iran National Standards Organization.
