= Islamic Society of Students =

Organization in Iran

- Secretary-General: Hossein Akhgarpour
- Founded: 1989
- Split from: Office for Strengthening Unity
- Ideology: Social conservatism
- Political position: Right-wing
- National affiliation: Front of Followers of the Line of the Imam and the Leader
- Slogan: Arabic: یا أَیُّهَا الَّذینَ آمَنُوا اصْبِرُوا وَ صابِرُوا وَ رابِطُوا وَ اتَّقُوا اللَّهَ لَعَلَّکُمْ تُفْلِحُونَ "O believers! Patiently endure, persevere, stand on guard, and be mindful of Allah, so you may be successful." ^{[Quran 3:200]}

The Union of Islamic Student Societies (Persian: اتحادیه جامعه اسلامی دانشجویان) also known as the Islamic Society of Students is an Iranian student organization.

The organization is officially affiliated with the conservative alliance Front of Followers of the Line of the Imam and the Leader. It is close to Student Basij Organization and is known for containing the influence of Islamic Association of Students and Office for Strengthening Unity.

Student Justice-Seeking Movement and Independent Islamic Association of Students are similar organizations.
