= Fatemeh Mohajerani =

Spokesperson of the Iranian Government

- فاطمه مهاجرانی
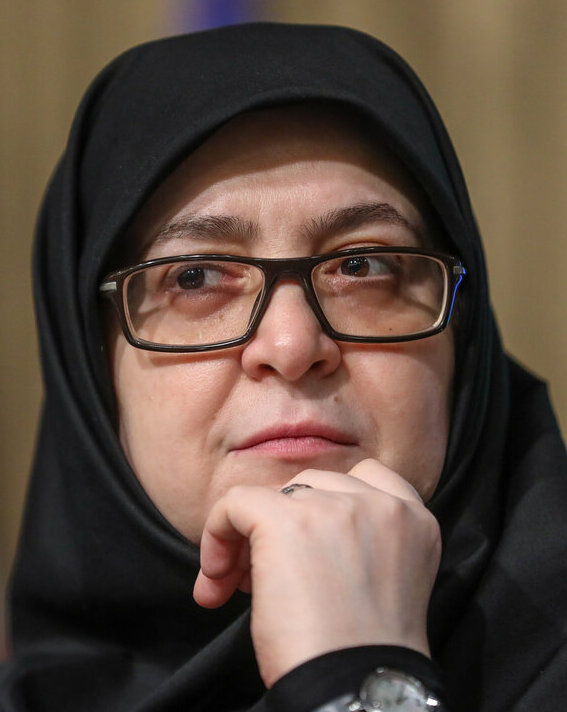
- Mohajerani in 2024

Spokesperson of the Government of Iran
- Incumbent
- Assumed office 28 August 2024
- President: Masoud Pezeshkian
- Preceded by: Ali Bahadori Jahromi

Personal details
- Born: 1 August 1970 (age 56) Arak, Imperial State of Iran
- Children: 1

Fatemeh Mohajerani (Persian: فاطمه مهاجرانی; born 1 August 1970) is an Iranian politician and current spokesperson of the Iranian Government. She is the first female spokesperson who was appointed to this office.

== Life ==
Mohajerani was born in Arak, Markazi province in 1970. She served as the head of the Technical and Vocational Training University for women in Shariati. On October 17, 2017, she was appointed as head of the Center for Brilliant Talents by Mohammad Bathaei, Iran's former Minister of the Education.
