= Iran National Standards Organization =

National standards body of Iran

- Logo since 2022

Agency overview
- Formed: 1960; 66 years ago
- Preceding agency: Institute of Standards and Industrial Research of Iran (1960–2011)
- Agency executive: Farzaneh Ansari
- Website: inso.gov.ir

The Iran National Standards Organization (INSO; Persian: سازمان ملی استاندارد ایران), formerly the Institute of Standards and Industrial Research of Iran (ISIRI; Persian: مؤسسهٔ استاندارد و تحقیقات صنعتی ایران) until 2011, is the Iranian governmental institution for standardization and certification. It is the Iranian representative to International Organization for Standardization.

== See also ==
- Industry of Iran
- List of ISIRI standards
