= Moderation and Development Party =

Pragmatic-centrist political party in Iran

Moderation and Development Party حزب اعتدال و توسعه
- Leader: Hassan Rouhani
- Secretary-General: Mohammad Bagher Nobakht
- Spokesperson: Ramezan-Ali Sobhanifar
- Executive Secretary: Morteza Bank
- Politburo Head: Mahmoud Vaezi
- Election Head: Ali Jannati
- Founded: November 1999; 26 years ago
- Headquarters: Tehran, Iran
- Ideology: Moderatism; Pragmatism; Idealism; Islamic democracy Velâyat-e Faqih; Technocracy; Faction: Institutional economics Under the presidency of Hassan Rouhani: Neoliberalism; Moderate conservatism Economic liberalism Neo-Keynesianism; Populism; Reformism; Pro–foreign investment
- Political position: Centre
- National affiliation: Pragmatists; Reformists
- Alliance: Popular Coalition of Reforms (2008); List of Hope (2016); Friends of Hashemi (2020); Voice of the Nation (2024)
- Government: 1 / 33
- Parliament: 1 / 290

Website
- www.hezbet.ir

Moderation and Development Party (Persian: حزب اعتدال و توسعه, romanized: Hezb-e E'tedāl va Towse'eh) is a political party in Iran. It is a pragmatic-centrist political party which held its first congress in 2002.

== Platform ==
The party is part of the faction called "modernist right", "moderate reformists" and "technocrats" that draws from upper-level bureaucrats, industrialists and managers. It deals with a platform on modernization and economic growth rather than social justice, along with the Executives of Construction Party and the Islamic Labour Party. The party has been allied with Popular Coalition of Reforms and Pervasive Coalition of Reformists in parliamentary elections and has had good relations with both Mohammad Khatami’s reform program and Akbar Hashemi Rafsanjani. In April 2017, the party joined the supreme policymaking council of reformists.

Some sources branded them as part of the conservative camp in the 2000s or reformists under the leadership of Akbar Hashemi Rafsanjani. In 2003, the party's spokesperson wrote in Hamshahri, a major Iranian newspaper, that the party regards itself among "true reformists", who are idealists, considering "social realities" interpreted with the "principle of moderation".

According to Ali Afshari, the party prioritizes economic expansion and follows free market policies, however a minority faction represented by members, such as Bagher Nobakht, advocate institutionalized economy and maintain that the government should interfere to regulate markets to a limited extent. They support limited political and cultural transformations, and believe political activism should only be within the frameworks of the constitution. The party also embraces Velâyat-e Faqih.

== Presidential candidates ==
| Year | Candidate |
|---|---|
| 2001 | Mohammad Khatami |
| 2005 | Akbar Hashemi Rafsanjani |
| 2009 | Mir-Hossein Mousavi |
| 2013 | Hassan Rouhani |
| 2017 | Hassan Rouhani |
| 2024 | Masoud Pezeshkian |

== Members ==
=== Current officeholders ===
Cabinet

- Hassan Rouhani, President of Iran
- Mahmoud Vaezi, Chief of Staff
- Mohammad Bagher Nobakht, Vice President for Strategy
- Masoud Soltanifar, Minister of Sports

Parliament

- Bahram Parsaei (Shiraz)
- Zahra Saei (Tabriz, Osku and Azarshahr)
- Ali Nobakht (Tehran, Rey, Shemiranat and Eslamshahr)
- Ramezanali Sobhanifar (Sabzevar, Joghatai and Joveyn)
- Hadi Bahadori (Urmia)
- Sakineh Almasi (Kangan, Jam, Dayyer and Asaluyeh)
- Rasoul Khezri (Piranshahr and Sardasht)
- Shadmehr Kazemzadeh (Dehloran, Darreshahr and Abdanan)

== See also ==
- List of Islamic political parties
