= Ahmad Meydari =

Iranian politician and economist

- احمد میدری
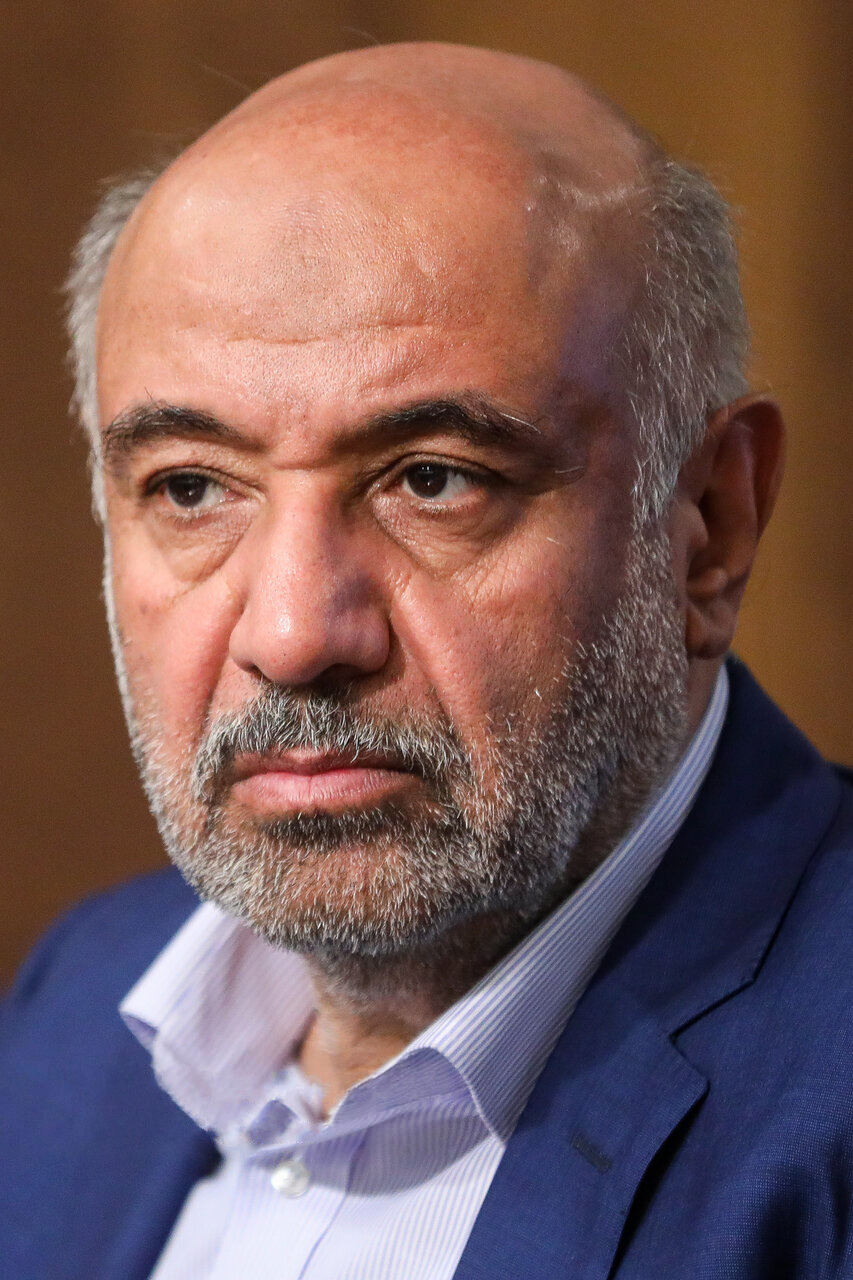
- Meydari in 2024

Minister of Cooperatives, Labour, and Social Welfare
- Incumbent
- Assumed office 21 August 2024
- President: Masoud Pezeshkian
- Preceded by: Sowlat Mortazavi

Member of the Parliament of Iran
- In office 27 May 2000 – 26 May 2004
- Constituency: Abadan

Personal details
- Born: 1963 (age 62–63)
- Education: Tehran University

Ahmad Meydari (Persian: احمد میدری; born 1963) is an Iranian politician and economist who has been the Minister of Cooperatives, Labour, and Social Welfare since August 21, 2024. He was the former representative of Abadan Constituency in the sixth convocation of the Islamic Consultative Assembly (Iranian parliament) and a member of the Economic Commission of that body.

== Biography ==
Meydari has a specialized doctorate in economics and a master's degree in economic development and planning from Tehran University. He has a teaching experience at Allameh Tabatabai University and Shahid Chamran University of Ahvaz, and in 2012, he completed a short-term educational and research course at the United Nations University in social welfare.

Meydari was a representative of the sixth convocation of the Islamic Consultative Assembly (2000–2004) from the constituency of Abadan and was a member of its Economic Commission. The signature of the letter known as Jam Zahr to the leader of the Islamic Republic of Iran (which, according to some, by him personally It was written among his actions during the representative period. Meydari was one of the 139 representatives of this parliament who sat down in the parliament in protest of their disqualification in the 7th parliament elections by the Guardian Council and collectively resigned from representation.

In the 11th and 12th governments, Meydari worked as the deputy of social welfare of the Ministry of Welfare and Social Security and was simultaneously appointed as the secretary of the Social Security Board of Trustees in 2013. Since 2016, he has been the head of the Statistics Committee (Statistical Council) of the Ministry of Cooperation, Labor and Social Welfare. On 21 August 2024 he was confirmed as Minister of Cooperatives, Labour, and Social Welfare in the Government of Masoud Pezeshkian.

== See also ==
- Hossein Samsami
