= Amin Hossein Rahimi =

Iranian politician (born 1968)

- امین‌حسین رحیمی
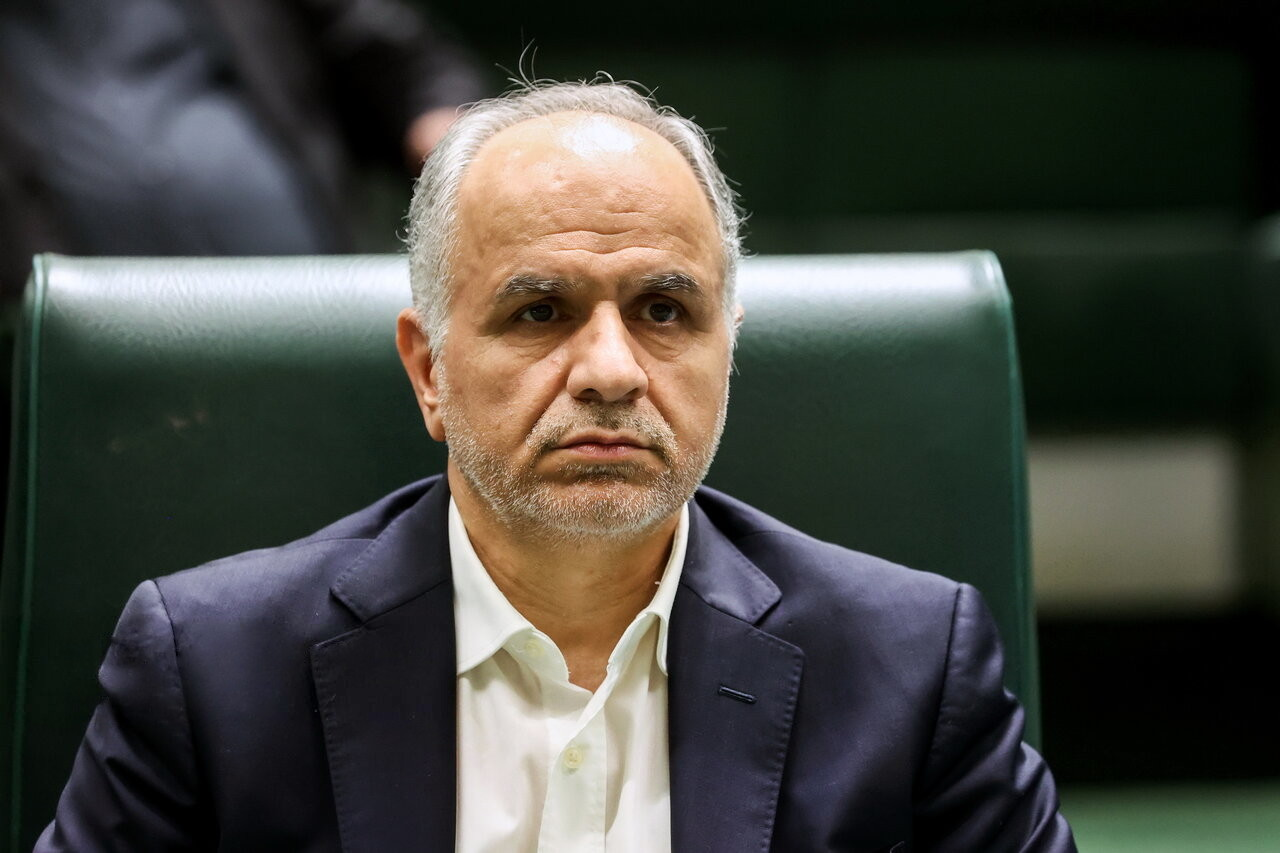
- Rahimi in 2024

Minister of Justice
- Incumbent
- Assumed office 25 August 2021
- President: Ebrahim Raisi; Mohammad Mokhber (acting); Masoud Pezeshkian
- Preceded by: Alireza Avayi

President of the Supreme Audit Court
- In office 4 September 2013 – 20 July 2016
- Preceded by: Abdolreza Rahmani Fazli
- Succeeded by: Adel Azar

Member of the Parliament of Iran
- In office 27 May 2008 – 26 May 2012
- Constituency: Malayer

Personal details
- Born: 1968 (age 56–57); Malayer, Hamadan province, Iran

Amin Hossein Rahimi (Persian: امین‌حسین رحیمی; born c. 1968) is an Iranian politician. He served in the majlis from 2008 and to 2012 and has been the minister of justice since 25 August 2021.

== Biography ==
Rahimi was born in Malayer, Hamadan province, in 1968. He was a Principlists member of the Majlis for Malayer in the eighth term between 2008 and 2012. Then he served as chief prosecutor in the Iranian Court of Audit. He was nominated as the minister of justice by Iranian President Ebrahim Raisi on 11 August 2021. His nomination was confirmed by the majlis on 25 August with 277 votes in favor which was the highest one given for Raisi's nominees.
