= Ministry of Justice (Iran) =

- وزارت دادگستری; Vezārat-e Dādgostari
- Flag of the Ministry of Justice

Agency overview
- Formed: 1906
- Jurisdiction: Government of the Islamic Republic of Iran
- Headquarters: Tehran
- Employees: 2317 (2019)
- Minister responsible: Amin Hossein Rahimi
- Website: moj.gov.ir/en

The Ministry of Justice is one of the Islamic Republic of Iran's ministries. Established in the Constitution of Iran, it has the responsibility of coordinating between the judicial branch and other branches of the government.

The Chief Justice of Iran can delegate financial and management of the judiciary as well as the hiring of non-Judges to the Minister of Justice.

== Introduction ==
Established in 1906, the Minister of Justice is responsible for prosecuting government cases, acting as the attorney-general of the country. They do not act as police, which is the responsibility of the Interior Minister of the Islamic Republic of Iran.

The ministry's headquarters was opened in 1938 and reflects pure European architectural style.

== Justice minister's selection ==
According to Article 130 of the Constitution, the chief justice nominates some candidates for serving as Justice Minister and then the president selects one of them.

== Deputy ministries ==
The Ministry of Justice has four deputy ministries

- Deputy ministry for Human rights and International Affairs
- Deputy ministry for Intellectual Property
- Deputy ministry for Law and Majlis Affairs
- Deputy ministry for Development, Management and Support

== List of ministers ==
The ministers have included the following:

- Nezam ol-Molk (1906)
- Ahmad Moshir al-Saltaneh (1906–1907) [1st official Minister of Justice]
- Abdol-Hossein Farman Farma (1907)
- Mohammad-Ali Ala ol-Saltaneh (1907)
- Seyyed Mahmood Khan 'Ala ul-Molk (1907)
- Hassan Pirnia (Moshir od-Dowleh) (1907)
- Nezam ol-Molk (1907)
- Mehdi Qoli Hedayat (1907)
- Hassan Esfandiari (1907)
- Mokhber ul-Molk (1907)
- Mehdi Qoli Khan Mokhber ul-Saltaneh (1907–1908)
- Mehdi Qoli Hedayat (1908)
- Mo'ayed ul-Saltaneh (1908)
- Mohtashem ul-Saltaneh (1908–1909)
- Ahmad Qavam (1909–1910)
- Vosugh od-Dowleh (1910)
- Hassan Esfandiari (1910–1911)
- Mohammed- 'Ali Khan Zoka' al-Molk (1911–1912)
- Esmail Momtaz od-Dowleh (1912)
- Mohammad Ali Foroughi (1913–1914)
- Mohammed- 'Ali Khan Zoka' al-Molk (1914–1915)
- Fathollah Khan Akbar (1915)
- Mohammad-Ali Ala ol-Saltaneh (1915–1916)
- Mahmood Khan 'Ala' ul-Molk (1916)
- Hassan Modarres (1916)
- Firouz Nosrat-ed-Dowleh III (1916–1917)
- Esmail Momtaz od-Dowleh (1917)
- Nasr ul-Molk (1917)
- Mokhber ul-Saltaneh (1917–1918)
- Nasr ul-Molk (1918)
- Firouz Nosrat-ed-Dowleh III (1918–1920)
- Mossadegh-ol-Saltaneh (1920)
- Soleiman Khan Meykadeh (1920–1921)
- Salar Lashkar (1921)
- Mostafa Adl (1921)
- Ebrahim 'Amid (1921–1922)
- Abdolhossein Teymourtash (1922)
- Moshar ul-Saltaneh (1922)
- Sardar Mo'azzam Khorasani (1922)
- Moshar ul-Saltaneh (1922–1923)
- Esmail Momtaz od-Dowleh (1923)
- 'Amid ul-Saltaneh (1923)
- Ebrahim Hakimi (1923)
- Mo'azed ul-Saltaneh (1923–1925)
- Firouz Nosrat-ed-Dowleh III (1925)
- 'Emad ul-Saltaneh Fatemi (1925–1926)
- Mohsen Sadr (1926)
- Mostafa Adl (1926–1927)
- Vosugh od-Dowleh (1926–1927)
- Ali-Akbar Davar (1926–1927)
- Ahmad Matin-Daftari (1927–1933)
- Mohsen Sadr (1933–1935)
- Ahmad Matin-Daftari (1935–1940)
- Majid Ahi (1940–1941)
- Mohammed Soruri (1940–1941)
- 'Ali Hey'at (1940–1941)
- Majid Ahi (1941–1942)
- Abbas Qoli Golshaian (1941–1942)
- Majid Ahi (1942)
- Mohsen Sadr (1942)
- 'Ali Asghar Hekmat (1942)
- Asadullah Mamaghani (1942–1943)
- Mohsen Sadr (1942–1943)
- Allah-Yar Saleh (1943–1944)
- Mostafa Adl (1944–1945)
- Allah-Yar Saleh (1945)
- Amanollah Ardalan (1945)
- Hasan'ali Kamal Hedayar (1945)
- Allah-Yar Saleh (1946)
- Ali Akbar Musavi Zadeh (1946–1947)
- Mohammed Soruri (1947–1948)
- Nezam ul-Saltaneh (1948)
- Abbas Qoli Golshaian (1948)
- Sajjadi (1948–1950)
- Mohammed 'Ali Buzari (1950–1951)
- Jamal Akhavi (1951)
- Ali Heyat (1951)
- Shamseddin Amir-Alai (1951–1952)
- Abdolali Lotfi (1952–1953)
- Jamal Akhavi (1953–1955)
- Fakhreddin Shadman (1953–1955)
- Abbas Quli Golshaian (1955–1957)
- Ali Amini (1955–1957)
- Mohammad Ali Hedayati (1957–1961)
- Mohammad 'Ali Momtaz (1961)
- Husein Najafi (1961)
- Noureddin Alamouti (1961–1962)
- Mohammad Baheri (1962–1964)
- Gholamhusein Khoshbin (1962–1964)
- Bagher Ameli (1964–1966)
- Javad Sadr (1967–1968)
- Manuchehr Parto (1968–1970)
- Sadeq Ahmadi (1972–1976)
- Mundhir al-Shawi (1976)
- Gholamreza Kianpour (1977–1978)
- Mohammed Baheri (1978)
- Husein Najafi (1978–1979)
- Yahya Sadeq Vaziri (1979)
- Asadollah Mobasheri (1979)
- Ahmad Sayyed Javadi (1979)
- Judicial Council under observation of Mohammad Beheshti (1979–1980)
- Ebrahim Ahadi (1980–1981)
- Mohammad Asghari (1981–1984)
- Hassan Habibi (1984–1989)
- Esmail Shooshtari (1989–2005)
- Jamal Karimi-Rad (2005–2006)
- Gholam-Hossein Elham (2006–2009)
- Morteza Bakhtiari (2009–2013)
- Mostafa Pourmohammadi (2013–2017)
- Alireza Avayi (2017–2021)
- Amin Hossein Rahimi (2021–present)

== See also ==
- General Inspection Office (Iran)
- Justice ministry
- Ministry of Interior (Iran)
- Ministry of Intelligence (Iran)
- Politics of Iran
