= Alireza Kazemi =

Iranian politician

- علیرضا کاظمی
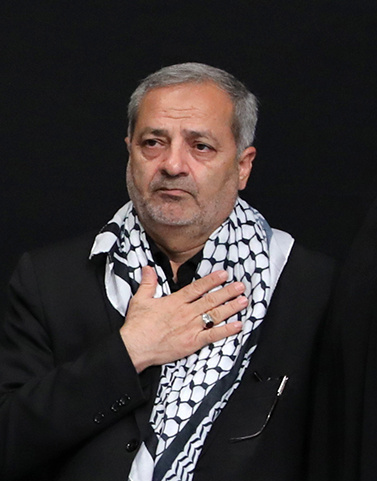
- Kazemi in 2024

Minister of Education
- Incumbent
- Assumed office 21 August 2024
- President: Masoud Pezeshkian
- Preceded by: Rezamorad Sahraei
- In office 26 August 2021 – 28 November 2021; Acting
- President: Ebrahim Raisi
- Preceded by: Mohsen Haji-Mirzaei
- Succeeded by: Yousef Nouri

Personal details
- Born: 1965 (age 60–61) Mashhad, Iran
- Party: Independent
- Relatives: Mohammad Kazemi (brother)
- Education: Ferdowsi University of Mashhad; Islamic Azad University, Mashhad Branch

Alireza Kazemi (Persian: علیرضا کاظمی; born 1965) is the current Minister of Education in the Islamic Republic of Iran since August 2024. He was the former Deputy Minister of Education of Iran and the acting head of the Ministry of Education of Iran in the government of Ebrahim Raisi.
