= Ministry of Education (Iran) =

Government ministry of Iran

Ministry of Education of the Islamic Republic of Iran
- وزارت آموزش و پرورش جمهوری اسلامی ایران; Vezârat-e Âmôzesh vâ Parvâresh-e Jomhuri-ye Eslâmi-ye Iran
- Flag of the Ministry of Education

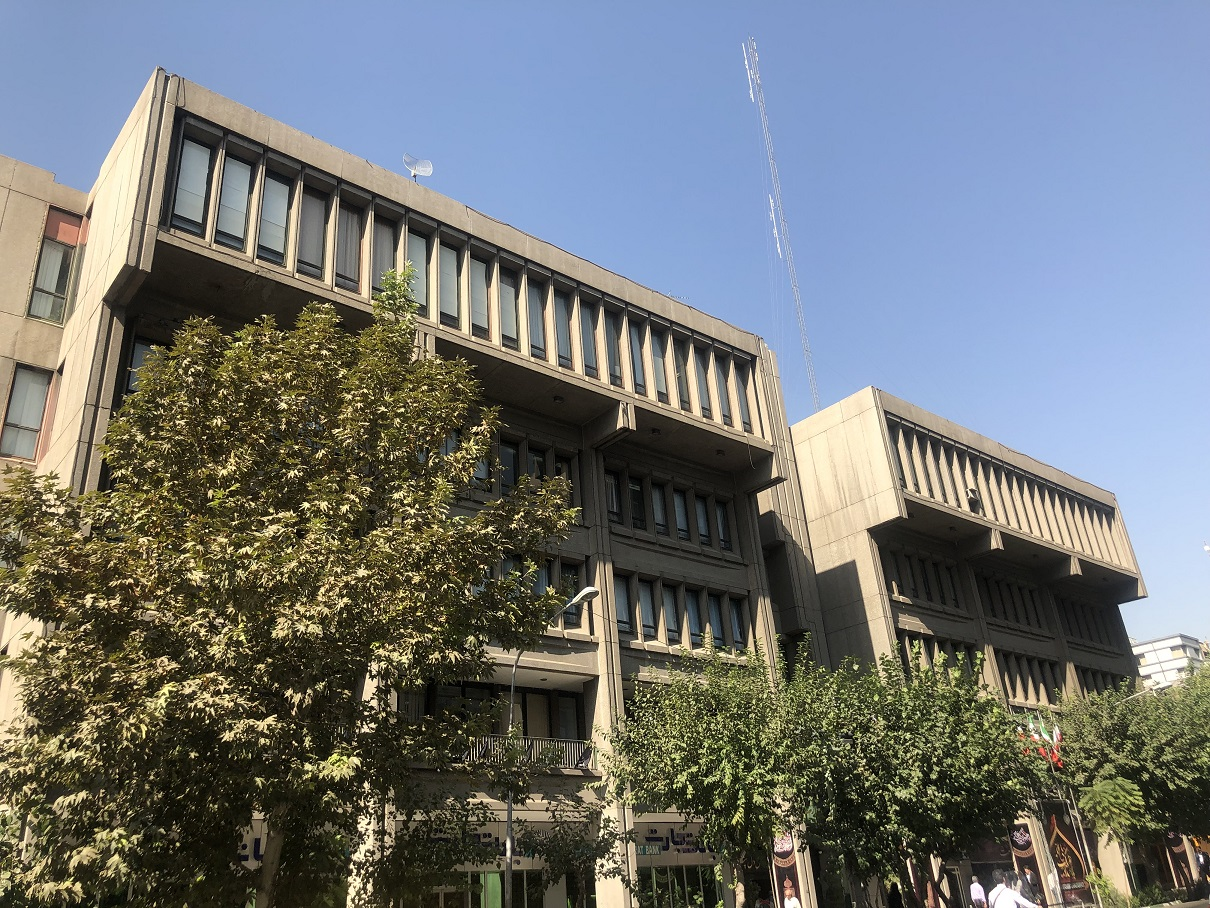

Agency overview
- Formed: 1964
- Jurisdiction: Government of the Islamic Republic of Iran
- Headquarters: Ferdowsi Square, Mohammadi Street, Tehran; 35°42′16″N 51°25′5″E
- Employees: 955,291 (2019)
- Minister responsible: Alireza Kazemi
- Website: Official website

The Ministry of Education of the Islamic Republic of Iran (Persian: وزارت آموزش و پرورش جمهوری اسلامی ایران, romanized: Vezârat-e Âmôzesh vâ Parvâresh-e Jomhuri-ye Eslâmi-ye Iran, lit. 'Ministry of Teaching and Growing of the Islamic Republic of Iran') established in 1964, is an Iranian government body (department) responsible for the oversight of K-12 education in Iran. Each year, a certain portion of the yearly budget gets allocated to public educational institutions (government-run schools and universities). Currently, the average of 20% of government spending and 5% of GDP is allocated to the education sector, a rate that is subjectively higher than most other countries that are in the similar age bracket of Iran (around the age of 50 years). The amount that is allocated to the educational institutions, 50% of it is given to secondary education institutions and 21% of the annual state education budget is allocated to the post-secondary educational institutions (tertiary educational institutions).

== See also ==
- Education in Iran
- Student Organization of Iran
- Farhangian University
- Ali Asghar Fani
- Adib Astronomy Teaching Centre
- Mohammad Bathaei
- Yousef Nouri
