= Presidency of Mahmoud Ahmadinejad =

Iranian presidential administration from 2005 to 2013

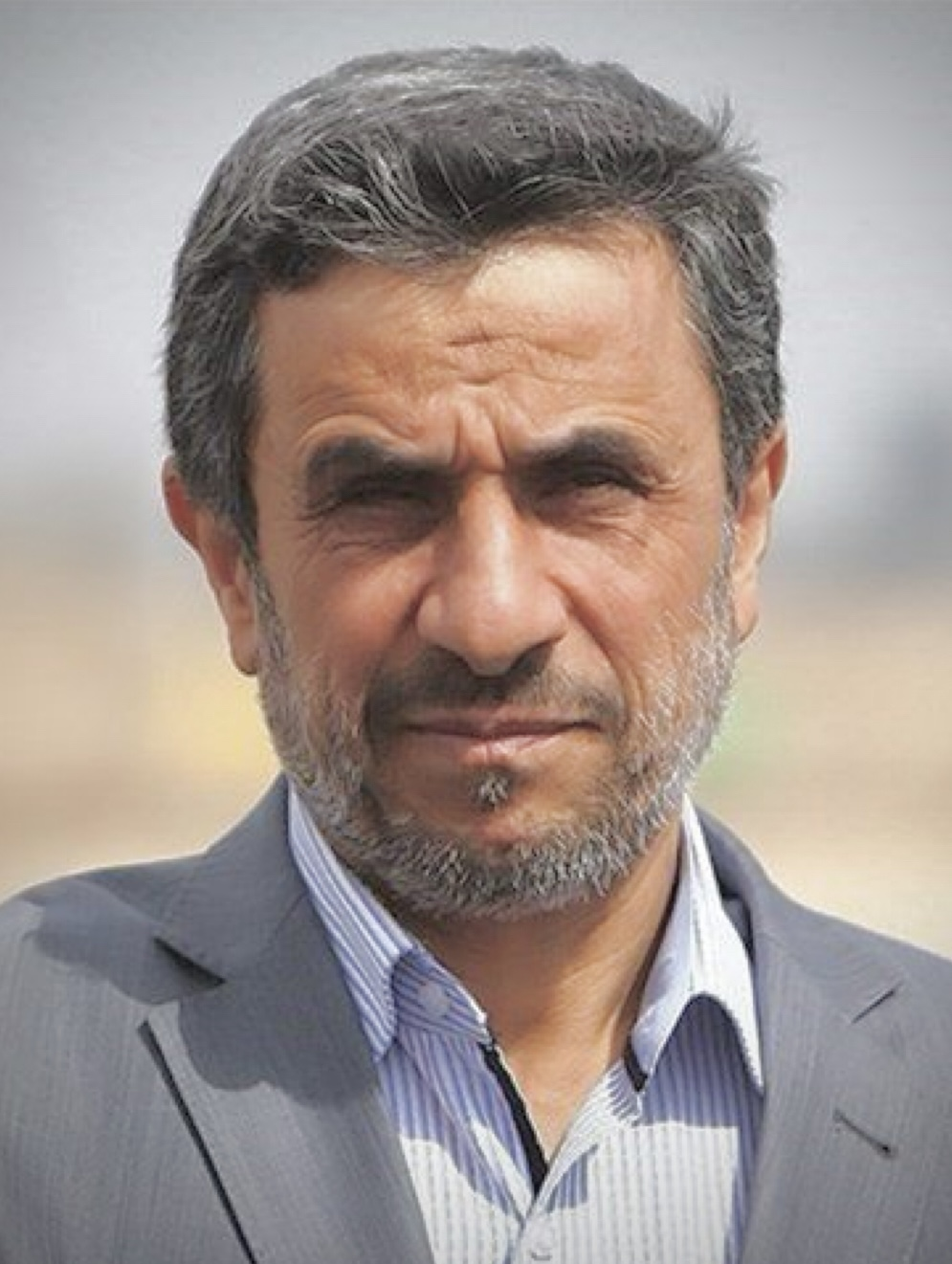
- Ahmadinejad in 2013
- Presidency of Mahmoud Ahmadinejad; 3 August 2005 – 3 August 2013
- Vice President: Mohammad Reza Aref, Parviz Davoodi, Esfandiar Rahim Mashaei, Mohammad Reza Rahimi
- Cabinet: Entire first list, Entire second list
- Party: Principalist (Society of Devotees)
- Election: 2005; 2009 (disputed)
- Seat: Pasteur St. Building
- Seal of the president

The Presidency of Mahmoud Ahmadinejad consists of the 9th and 10th governments of the Islamic Republic of Iran. Mahmoud Ahmadinejad's government began in August 2005 after his election as the 6th president of Iran and continued after his re-election in 2009. Ahmadinejad left office in August 2013 at the end of his second term. His administration was succeeded by the 11th government, led by Hassan Rouhani.

In Iran Mahmoud Ahmadinejad's government has seen controversy over policies such as his 2007 Gas Rationing Plan to reduce the country's fuel consumption, and cuts in maximum interest rates permitted to private and public banking facilities; his widely disputed and protested election to a second term in 2009; and over the presence of a so-called "deviant current" among his aides and supporters that led to the arrest of several of them in 2011. Abroad, his dismissal of international sanctions against Iran's nuclear energy program, and his call for an end of the state of Israeli and description of the Holocaust as a myth, has drawn criticism.

== Ahmadinejad's presidency ==
=== 2005 campaign ===
Ahmadinejad was not widely known when he entered the presidential election campaign, although he had already made his mark in Tehran for rolling back earlier reforms. He is a member of the Central Council of the Islamic Society of Engineers, but his key political support is inside the Alliance of Builders of Islamic Iran (Abadgaran or Developers).

Ahmadinejad generally sent mixed signals about his plans for his presidency, perhaps to attract both religious conservatives and the lower economic classes. His campaign slogan was: "It's possible and we can do it".

In the campaign, he took a populist approach. He emphasized his own modest life, and compared himself with Mohammad Ali Rajai, Iran's second president. Ahmadinejad said he planned to create an "exemplary government for the people of the world" in Iran. He was a "principlist", acting politically based on Islamic and revolutionary principles. One of his goals was "putting the petroleum income on people's tables", meaning Iran's oil profits would be distributed among the poor.

Ahmadinejad was the only presidential candidate who spoke out against future relations with the United States. He told Islamic Republic of Iran Broadcasting the United Nations was "one-sided, stacked against the world of Islam." He opposed the veto power of the UN Security Council's five permanent members: "It is not just for a few states to sit and veto global approvals. Should such a privilege continue to exist, the Muslim world with a population of nearly 1.5 billion should be extended the same privilege." He defended Iran's nuclear program and accused "a few arrogant powers" of trying to limit Iran's industrial and technological development in this and other fields.

In his second round campaign, he said, "We didn't participate in the revolution for turn-by-turn government.…This revolution tries to reach a world-wide government." He spoke of an extended program using trade to improve foreign relations, and called for greater ties with Iran's neighbours and ending visa requirements between states in the region, saying that "people should visit anywhere they wish freely. People should have freedom in their pilgrimages and tours."

Ahmadinejad described Ayatollah Mohammad Taghi Mesbah Yazdi, a senior cleric from Qom as his ideological and spiritual mentor. Mesbah founded the Haghani School of thought in Iran. He and his team strongly supported Ahmadinejad's 2005 presidential campaign.

=== 2005 election ===
Ahmadinejad won 62 percent of the vote in the run-off poll against Akbar Hashemi Rafsanjani. Supreme Leader Ayatollah Khamenei authorized his presidency on 3 August 2005. Ahmedinejad kissed Khamenei's hand during the ceremony to show his loyalty.

=== 2006 Councils and Assembly of Experts election ===
Ahmadinejad's team lost the 2006 city council elections, and his spiritual mentor, Mohammad Taghi Mesbah Yazdi, was ranked sixth on the country's Assembly of Experts. In the first nationwide election since Ahmadinejad became president, his allies failed to dominate election returns for the Assembly of Experts and local councils. Results, with a turnout of about 60%, suggested a voter shift toward more moderate policies. According to an editorial in the Kargozaran independent daily newspaper, "The results show that voters have learned from the past and concluded that we need to support.. moderate figures." An Iranian political analyst said that "this is a blow for Ahmadinejad and Mesbah Yazdi's list."

=== 2009 presidential election ===
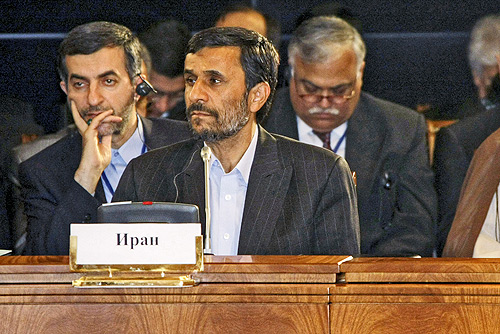
Ahmadinejad in Yekaterinburg, Russia, 16 June 2009

On 23 August 2008, Supreme Leader Ali Khamenei announced that he "sees Ahmadinejad as president in the next five years," a comment interpreted as indicating support for Ahmadinejad's reelection. 39,165,191 ballots were cast in the election on 12 June 2009, according to Iran's election headquarters. Ahmadinejad won 24,527,516 votes, (62.63%). In second place, Mir-Hossein Mousavi, won 13,216,411 (33.75%) of the votes. The election drew unprecedented public interest in Iran.

== 2009 Iranian presidential election protests ==
The election results were strongly disputed by both Mousavi and Ahmadinejad and their respective supporters who believed that electoral fraud occurred during the election. Street protests commenced the day after the election and continued off and on into 2010. Supreme Leader Ayatollah Ali Khamenei declared the election of Mahmoud Ahmadinejad a "divine assessment," and formally endorsed Ahmadinejad as president on 3 August 2009. Ahmadinejad was sworn in for a second term on 5 August 2009. Several Iranian political figures appeared to avoid the ceremony. Former presidents Mohammad Khatami, and Akbar Hashemi Rafsanjani, who is currently head of the Expediency Discernment Council, along with opposition leader Mir Hossein Mousavi, did not attend the ceremony. Opposition groups asked protesters on reformist websites and blogs to launch new street demonstrations on the day of the inauguration ceremony. On inauguration day, hundreds of riot police met opposition protesters outside parliament. After taking the oath of office, which was broadcast live on Iranian state television, Ahmadinejad said that he will "protect the official faith, the system of the Islamic revolution and the constitution". France, Germany, the United Kingdom and the United States announced that they would not send the usual letters of congratulation. While addressing the 11th scientific and research meeting of university professors on 31 July 2009, president Ahmadinejad concluded:

The June 12 presidential election ruined the dominance of wealth, political party system and media as tools of the hegemonic system and presented a new role model to the human race.

== Domestic policy ==
=== Economic policy ===
Ahmadinejad's economic policies have been described as populist, one of his campaign promises being to share out Iran's oil wealth more fairly. He's also condemned global capitalism as an immoral system, and proclaimed that the "era of capitalist thinking" is over. However, in December 2010 his administration embarked on a "sweeping reform" of state subsidies in place since the beginning of the Islamic Republic. Supreme Leader Ali Khamenei, has called 2011 a "year of economic jihad", and the program has been applauded by the International Monetary Fund.

In Ahmadinejad's first four years as president, unemployment decreased due to a rise in income from oil exports as oil price rose on world markets. His critics have charged that government spending has been inflationary. Ahmadinejad increased spending by 25 percent and has supported subsidies for food and gasoline. He also initially refused a gradual increase of petrol prices, saying that after making necessary preparations, such as a development of public transportation system, the government will free up petrol prices after five years. Interest rates were cut by presidential decree to below the inflation rate. One unintended effect of this stimulation of the economy has been the bidding up of some urban real estate prices by two or three times their pre-Ahmadinejad value by Iranians seeking to invest surplus cash and finding few other safe opportunities. The resulting increase in the cost of housing has hurt poorer, non-property owning Iranians, the putative beneficiaries of Ahmadinejad's populist policies. As of mid-2011, economic growth has been called "sluggish", up 3.5% in 2010, a rate insufficient to lower the unemployment rate of close to 15%.

In June 2006, 50 Iranian economists wrote a letter to Ahmadinejad that criticized his price interventions to stabilize prices of goods, cement, government services, and his decree issued by the High Labor Council and the Ministry of Labor that proposed an increase of workers' salaries by 40 percent. Ahmadinejad publicly responded harshly to the letter and denounced the accusations. The Management and Planning Organisation, a state body charged with mapping out long-term economic and budget strategy, was broken up and its experienced managers were fired.

Ahmadinejad has called for "middle-of-the-road" compromises with respect to Western-oriented capitalism and socialism. Current political conflicts with the United States have caused the central bank to fear increased capital flight due to global isolation. These factors have prevented an improvement of infrastructure and capital influx, despite high economic potential. Among those that did not vote for him in the first election, only 3.5 percent said they would consider voting for him in the next election. Former supporter of Ahmadinejad who have criticized his policies include Mohammad Khoshchehreh, a member of parliament who campaigned for Ahmadinejad, but in 2007 complained his government "has been strong on populist slogans, but weak on achievement;" and economist and former adviser Hossein Raghfar, who has cited the decline in the price for human kidneys (which has dropped from $10,000 to $2,000 as more poor people sell their organs for cash), as evidence of increased poverty under the administration. President Ahmadinejad has changed almost all of his economic ministers, including oil, industry and economy, since coming to power in 2005. In an interview with Fars News Agency in April 2008, Davoud Danesh Jaafari who acted as minister of economy in President Ahmadinejad's cabinet, harshly criticized Ahmadinejad's economic policy: "During my time, there was no positive attitude towards previous experiences or experienced people and there was no plan for the future. Peripheral issues which were not of dire importance to the nation were given priority. Most of the scientific economic concepts like the effect of liquidity on inflation were put in question." In response to these criticisms, Ahmadinejad accused his minister of not being "a man of justice" and declared that the solution to Iran's economic problem is "the culture of martyrdom". In May 2008, the Petroleum minister of Iran admitted that the government illegally invested 2 billion dollars to import petrol in 2007. At Iranian parliament, he also mentioned that he simply followed the president's order.

While his government had 275 thousand billion toman oil income, the highest in Iranian history, Ahmadinejad's government had the highest budget deficit since the Iranian revolution.

During his presidency, Ahmadinejad launched a gas rationing plan to reduce the country's fuel consumption. He also instituted cuts in the interest rates that private and public banking facilities could charge. He issued a directive, according to which the Management and Planning Organization should be affiliated to the government.

=== Family planning and population policy ===
In October 2006, Ahmadinejad opposed encouraging families to limit themselves to just two children, stating that Iran could cope with 50 million more people than the current 70 million. In remarks that have drawn criticism, he told MPs he wanted to scrap existing birth control policies which discouraged Iranian couples from having more than two children. Critics said his call was ill-judged at a time when Iran was struggling with surging inflation and rising unemployment, estimated at 11 percent. Ahmadinejad's call for an increased birth rate is reminiscent of a call Ayatollah Ruhollah Khomeini made in 1979. The policy was effective in increasing population growth, but was eventually reversed in response to the resultant economic strain.

In 2008, the government sent the "Family Protection Bill" to the Iranian parliament. Women's rights activists criticized the bill for removing protections from women, such as the requirement that a husband obtain his wife's consent before bringing another wife into the family.

=== Housing ===
The first legislation to emerge from his newly formed government was a 12 trillion rial (US$1.3 billion) fund called "Reza's Compassion Fund", named after Shi'a Imam Ali al-Rida. Ahmadinejad's government said this fund would tap Iran's oil revenues to help young people get jobs, afford marriage, and buy their own homes. The fund also sought charitable donations, with a board of trustees in each of Iran's 30 provinces. The legislation was a response to the cost of urban housing, which is pushing up the national average marital age (currently around 25 years for women and 28 years for men). In 2006 the Iranian parliament rejected the fund. However, Ahmadinejad ordered the administrative council to execute the plan.

=== Human rights ===
According to a report by the group Human Rights Watch, "Since President Ahmadinejad came to power, treatment of detainees has worsened in Evin Prison as well as in detention centers operated clandestinely by the Judiciary, the Ministry of Information, and the Islamic Revolutionary Guard Corps." Again according to Human Rights Watch, "Respect for basic human rights in Iran, especially freedom of expression and assembly, deteriorated in 2006. The government routinely tortures and mistreats detained dissidents, including through prolonged solitary confinement." Human Rights Watch described the source of human rights violations in contemporary Iran as coming from the Judiciary, accountable to Ali Khamenei, and from members directly appointed by Ahmadinejad.

Responses to dissent have varied. Human Rights Watch writes that "the Ahmadinejad government, in a pronounced shift from the policy under former president Mohammed Khatami, has shown no tolerance for peaceful protests and gatherings." In December 2006, Ahmadinejad advised officials not to disturb students who engaged in a protest during a speech of his at the Amirkabir University of Technology in Tehran, although speakers at other protests have included among their complaints that there had been a crackdown on dissent at universities since Ahmadinejad was elected.

In April 2007, the Tehran police, which is under Khamenei's supervision, began a crackdown on women with "improper hijab." This led to criticism from associates of Ahmadinejad.

=== Universities ===
In 2006, the [Ahmadinejad] government reportedly forced numerous Iranian scientists and university professors to resign or to retire. It has been referred to as "second cultural revolution". The policy has been said to replace old professors with younger ones. Some university professors received letters indicating their early retirement unexpectedly. In November 2006, 53 university professors had to retire from Iran University of Science and Technology.

In 2006, Ahmadinejad's government applied a 50 percent quota for male students and 50 percent for female students in the university entrance exam for medicine, dentistry and pharmacy. The plan was supposed to stop the growing presence of female students in the universities. In a response to critics, Iranian minister of health and medical education, Kamran Bagheri Lankarani argued that there are not enough facilities such as dormitories for female students. Masoud Salehi, president of Zahedan University said that presence of women generates some problems with transportation. Also, Ebrahim Mekaniki, president of Babol University of Medical Sciences, stated that an increase in the presence of women will make it difficult to distribute facilities in a suitable manner. Bagher Larijani, the president of Tehran University of Medical Sciences made similar remarks. According to Rooz Online, the quotas lack a legal foundation and are justified as support for "family" and "religion."

==== December 2006 student protest ====
On 11 December 2006, some students disrupted a speech by Ahmadinejad at the Amirkabir University of Technology (Tehran Polytechnic) in Tehran. According to the Iranian Student News Agency, students set fire to photographs of Ahmadinejad and threw firecrackers. The protesters also chanted "death to the dictator." It was the first major public protest against Ahmadinejad since his election. In a statement carried on the students' Web site, they announced that they had been protesting the growing political pressure under Ahmadinejad, also accusing him of corruption, mismanagement, and discrimination. The statement added that "the students showed that despite vast propaganda, the president has not been able to deceive academia." It was also reported that some students were angry about the International Conference to Review the Global Vision of the Holocaust.

In response to the students' slogans, the president said: "We have been standing up to dictatorship so that no one will dare to establish dictatorship in a millennium even in the name of freedom. Given the scars inflicted on the Iranian nation by agents of the US and British dictatorship, no one will ever dare to initiate the rise of a dictator." It was reported that even though the protesters broke the TV cameras and threw hand-made bombs at Ahmadinejad, the president asked the officials not to question or disturb the protesters. In his blog, Ahmadinejad described his reaction to the incident as "a feeling of joy" because of the freedom that people enjoyed after the revolution.

One thousand students also protested the day before to denounce the increased pressure on the reformist groups at the university. One week prior, more than two thousand students protested at Tehran University on the country's annual student day, with speakers saying that there had been a crackdown on dissent at universities since Ahmadinejad was elected.

=== Nuclear program ===
Ahmadinejad has been a vocal supporter of Iran's nuclear program, and has insisted that it is for peaceful purposes. He has repeatedly emphasized that building a nuclear bomb is not the policy of his government. He has said that such a policy is "illegal and against our religion." He also added at a January 2006 conference in Tehran that a nation with "culture, logic and civilization" would not need nuclear weapons, and that countries that seek nuclear weapons are those which want to solve all problems by the use of force.

In April 2006, Ahmadinejad announced that Iran had successfully refined uranium to a stage suitable for the nuclear fuel cycle. In a speech to students and academics in Mashhad, he was quoted as saying that Iran's conditions had changed completely as it had become a nuclear state and could talk to other states from that stand. On 13 April 2006, Iranian news agency, IRNA, quoted Ahmadinejad as saying that the peaceful Iranian nuclear technology would not pose a threat to any party because "we want peace and stability and we will not cause injustice to anyone and at the same time we will not submit to injustice." Nevertheless, Iran's nuclear policy under Ahmadinejad's administration has received much criticism, spearheaded by the United States and Israel. The accusations include that Iran is striving to obtain nuclear arms and developing long-range firing capabilities, and that Ahmadinejad issued an order to keep UN inspectors from freely visiting the nation's nuclear facilities and viewing their designs, a move which would be in defiance of an IAEA resolution. Following a May 2009 test launch of a long-range missile, Ahmadinejad was quoted as telling the crowd that with its nuclear program, Iran was sending the West a message that "the Islamic Republic of Iran is running the show."

Despite Ahmadinejad's vocal support for the program, the office of the Iranian president is not directly responsible for nuclear policy. It is instead set by the Supreme National Security Council. The council includes two representatives appointed by the Supreme Leader, military officials, and members of the executive, judicial, and legislative branches of government, and reports directly to Supreme Leader Ali Khamenei, who issued a fatwa against nuclear weapons in 2005. Khamenei has criticized Ahmadinejad's "personalization" of the nuclear issue.

Ahmadinejad vowed in February 2008, that Iran will not be held back from developing its peaceful nuclear program and has stated that at least 16 different peaceful uses for nuclear technology have so far been identified. In a 2009 interview, when asked by reporter Ann Curry whether he would rule out an Iranian nuclear bomb in the future, he responded: "We have no need for nuclear weapons." When Curry retorted, "So, may I assume, then, your answer to that question is 'no'?" Ahmadinejad repeated his answer, adding "Without such weapons, we are very much able to defend ourselves." Curry then warned Ahmadinejad that "people will remark that you did not say no." To which Ahmadinejad responded, "You can take from this whatever you want, madam."

In October 2009 the United States, France and Russia proposed a U.N.-drafted deal with Iran regarding its nuclear program, in an effort to find a compromise between Iran's stated need for a nuclear reactor and the concerns of those who are worried that Iran harbors a secret intent on developing a nuclear weapon. After some delay in responding, on 29 October, Ahmadinejad seemed to change his tone towards the deal. "We welcome fuel exchange, nuclear co-operation, building of power plants and reactors and we are ready to co-operate," he said in a live broadcast on state television. However, he added that Iran would not retreat "one iota" on its right to a sovereign nuclear program.

== Domestic criticism and controversies ==
=== Alleged corruption ===
Ahmadinejad has been criticized for attacking private "plunderers" and "corrupt officials," while engaging in "cronyism and political favouritism". Many of his close associates have been appointed to positions for which they have no obvious qualifications, and "billion dollar no-bid contracts" have been awarded to the Islamic Revolutionary Guard Corps (IRGC), an organization with which he is strongly associated.

=== "Wiped off the map" ===
It has been widely alleged in the media that Ahmadinejad, during a 2005 speech, stated that Israel should be "wiped off the map". This phrase is an English idiomatic expression which implies physical destruction.

According to Juan Cole, a University of Michigan Professor of Modern Middle East and South Asian History, Ahmadinejad's statement was inaccurately translated; Cole suggests that a more accurate translation would be:

The Imam said that this regime occupying Jerusalem (een rezhim-e ishghalgar-e qods) must [vanish] from the page of time (bayad az safheh-ye ruzgar mahv shavad).

In a 11 June 2006 analysis of the translation controversy, New York Times deputy foreign editor and Israeli resident Ethan Bronner argued that Ahmadinejad had called for Israel to be wiped off the map. After noting the objections of critics such as Cole, Bronner stated:

But translators in Tehran who work for the president's office and the foreign ministry disagree with them. All official translations of Mr. Ahmadinejad's statement, including a description of it on his website, refer to wiping Israel away. Sohrab Mahdavi, one of Iran’s most prominent translators, and Siamak Namazi, managing director of a Tehran consulting firm, who is bilingual, both say "wipe off" or "wipe away" is more accurate than "vanish" because the Persian verb is active and transitive.

Despite these differences, Ethan Bronner does agree with Professor Cole that Ahmadinejad did not use the word "Israel" (but rather "regime over Jerusalem") and also did not use the word "map" (but rather "page(s) of time"). Emphasizing these points of agreement, Jonathon Steele from The Guardian concludes that "experts confirm that Iran's president did not call for Israel to be 'wiped off the map'". Furthermore, Steele cites a source at the BBC, as well as the Middle East Media Research Institute (MEMRI), supporting the following translation:

This regime that is occupying Jerusalem must be eliminated from the pages of history.

While this translation is quite similar to Professor Cole's version, it does use the word "eliminated" rather than "vanish", which is consistent with Bronner's suggestion that an "active" verb would more accurately reflect the original Persian.

In a speech on 2 June 2008, the Iranian presidential website quotes Ahmadinejad as saying

"the Zionist Regime of Israel faces a deadend and will under God's grace be wiped off the map."

and

"the Zionist Regime that is a usurper and illegitimate regime and a cancerous tumor should be wiped off the map."

The statements were translated by Reuters as

"The Zionist regime is in a total dead end and, God willing, this desire will soon be realized and the epitome of perversion will disappear off the face of the world."

and

"You should know that the criminal and terrorist Zionist regime which has 60 years of plundering, aggression and crimes in its file has reached the end of its work and will soon disappear off the geographical scene"

=== Other statements ===
In June 2007, Ahmadinejad was criticized by some Iranian parliament members over his remark about Christianity and Judaism. According to Aftab News Agency, Ahmadinejad stated: "In the world, there are deviations from the right path: Christianity and Judaism. Dollars have been devoted to the propagation of these deviations. There are also false claims that these [religions] will save mankind. But Islam is the only religion that [can] save mankind." Some members of Iranian parliament criticized these remarks as being fuels to religious war.

Conservative MP Rafat Bayat has blamed Ahmadinejad for a decline in observance of the required hijab for women, calling him "not that strict on this issue". Ahmadinejad has been also accused of indecency by people close to Rafsanjani, after he publicly kissed the hand of a woman who used to be his school teacher.

=== The UN and football stadiums ===
Two statements that have brought criticism from some religious authorities concern his speech at the United Nations, and the attendance of women at football matches. In a visit to group of Ayatollahs in Qom after returning from his 2005 speech to the UN General Assembly, Ahmadinejad stated he had "felt a halo over his head" during his speech and that a hidden presence had mesmerized the unblinking audience of foreign leaders, foreign ministers, and ambassadors. According to at least one source (Hooman Majd), this was offensive to the conservative religious leaders because an ordinary man cannot presume a special closeness to God or any of the Imams, nor can he imply the presence of the Mahdi.

In another statement the next year, Ahmadinejad proclaimed (without consulting the clerics before hand), that women should be allowed into football stadiums to watch male football clubs compete. This proclamation "was quickly overruled" by clerical authorities, one of whom, Grand Ayatollah Mohammad Fazel Lankarani "refused for weeks to meet with President Ahmadinejad" in early 2007.

=== Iran constitution conflict ===
In 2008, a serious conflict emerged between the Iranian President and the head of parliament over three laws approved by Iranian parliament: "the agreement for civil and criminal legal cooperation between Iran and Kyrgyzstan", "the agreement to support mutual investment between Iran and Kuwait", and "the law for registration of industrial designs and trademarks". The conflict was so serious that the Iranian leader stepped in to resolve the conflict. Ahmadinejad wrote a letter to parliament speaker Gholam-Ali Haddad-Adel, furiously denouncing him for an "inexplicable act" in bypassing the presidency by giving the order to implement legislation in an official newspaper. President Ahmadinejad accused the head of parliament of violating Iranian constitutional law. He called for legal action against the Parliament speaker. Haddad-Adel responded to Ahmadinejad accusing him of using inappropriate language in his remarks and letters.

=== Ali Kordan ===
In August 2008, Ahmaghinejad, nominated Ali Kordan for Iran's interior minister. Kordan's nomination was criticized by Iranian parliamentarians, media and analysts after it came to light that a doctoral degree allegedly awarded to Ali Kordan was fabricated, and that the putative issuer of the degree, Oxford University, had no record of Kordan receiving any degree from the university. It was also revealed that he had been jailed in 1978 for moral charges. Fabrication of legal documents is punishable in Iranian law with one to three years of imprisonment and in the case of government officials, the maximum sentence (three years) is demanded.

In November 2008, President Ahmadinejad announced that he was against impeachment of Ali Kordan by Iranian parliament. He refused to attend the parliament on the impeachment day. Ali Kordan was expelled from Iranian interior ministry by Iranian parliament on 4 November 2008. 188 MPs voted against Ali Kordan. An impeachment of Kordan would push Ahmadinejad close to having to submit his entire cabinet for review by parliament, which is led by one of his chief political opponents. Iran's constitution requires that step if more than half the cabinet ministers are replaced, and Ahmadinejad has replaced nine of 21.

=== Conflict with Parliament ===
In February 2009 after Supreme Audit Court of Iran reported that $1.058 billion of surplus oil revenue in the (2006–07) budget hasn't been returned by the government to the national treasury, Ali Larijani – Iran's parliamentary speaker – called for further investigations to make sure the missing funds are returned to the treasury as soon as possible. Ahmadinejad criticized the National Audit Office for what he called its "carelessness", saying the report "incites the people" against the government. The head of the parliament Energy Commission, Hamidreza Katouzian, reported: The government spent $5 billion to import fuel, about $2 billion more than the sum parliament had authorized. Katouzian quoted Iran's Oil Minister, Gholam-Hossein Nozari, as saying that President Mahmoud Ahmadinejad had ordered the extra purchase.

In May 2011 several members of parliament threatened to initiate impeachment proceedings against Ahmadinejad after his merger of eight government ministries and the firing of three ministers without parliament's consent. According to the Majles News Web site, MP Mohammad Reza Bahonar stated, "legal purging starts with questions, which lead to warnings and end with impeachment." On 25 May parliament voted to investigate another allegation, that Ahmadinejad had committed election irregularities by giving cash to up to nine million Iranians before the 2009 presidential elections. The vote came within hours after the allegations appeared in several popular conservative news sites associated with supreme leader Ali Khamenei, suggesting the supreme leader supported the investigation. The disputes were seen as part of the clash between Ahmadinejad and other conservatives and former supporters, including supreme leader Khamenei, over what the conservatives see as Ahmadinejad's confrontational policies and abuse of power.

The March–April 2012 parliamentary election has been described "as a contest between" Iran's Supreme Leader Ali Khamenei and president Mahmoud Ahmadinejad, which hardliner supporters of Khamenei won, gaining a strong majority in parliament. Following the first round of elections Ahmadinejad was summoned to testify before parliament on issues such as his economic policies, his views on the obligatory Islamic head scarves for Iranian women and his relations with the supreme leader. It was the first time a president had been summoned before the Iranian parliament and one commentator (Thomas Erdbrink) described it as "a serious blow" to Ahmadinejad's "standing", though Ahmadinejad is said to have spent much of the session "deflecting lawmakers’ questions with jokes and mockery", and the whole incident is reported to have been a sign that Ahmadinejad's "dispute with Khamenei had been resolved," and there would be no impeachment of the president.

=== "Earthquake Saferoom" ===
Ahmadinejad was involved in a fraud in which he along with Ali Akbar Mehrabian and Mousa Mazloum in 2005 published an invention by Farzan Salimi, claiming it as their own. The idea for an "earthquake saferoom"—a design for a fortified room in homes in case of disaster was owned by Farzan Salimi, an Iranian researcher and engineer.

In July 2009, the general court of Tehran convicted Industry Minister Ali Akbar Mehrabian and Mousa Mazloum but kept silent about Mahmoud Ahmadinejad's involvement, according to Etemad-Melli daily. According to the BBC, Ahmadinejad is named as an author on the cover of the book in which the fraudulent claim was made.

=== Relations with Supreme Leader ===
Early in his presidency, Ahmadinejad was sometimes described as "enjoy[ing] the full backing" of the Supreme Leader Ali Khamenei, and even as being his "protege." In Ahmadinejad's 2005 inauguration the supreme leader allowed Ahmadinejad to kiss his hand and cheeks in what was called "a sign of closeness and loyalty," and after the 2009 election fully endorsed Ahmadinejad against protesters. However, as early as January 2008 signs of disagreement between the two men developed over domestic policies, and by 2010-11 several sources detected a "growing rift" between Ahmadinejad and Khamenei. The disagreement has been described as centering on Esfandiar Rahim Mashaei, a top adviser and close confidant of Ahmadinejad and opponent of "greater involvement of clerics in politics", who was First Vice President of Iran until being ordered to resign from the cabinet by the supreme leader. In 2009 Ahmadinejad dismissed Intelligence minister Gholam-Hossein Mohseni-Eje'i, an opponent of Mashaei. In April 2011, another Intelligence minister, Heydar Moslehi, resigned after being asked to by Ahmadinejad, but was reinstated by the supreme leader within hours. Ahmadinejad declined to officially back Moslehi's reinstatement for two weeks and in protest engaged in an "11-day walkout" of cabinet meetings, religious ceremonies, and other official functions. Ahmadinejad's actions led to angry public attacks by clerics, parliamentarians and military commanders, who accused him of ignoring orders from the supreme leader. Conservative opponents in parliament launched an "impeachment drive" against him, four websites with ties to Ahmadinejad reportedly were "filtered and blocked", and several people "said to be close" to the president and Mashaei were arrested on charges of being "magicians" and invoking djinns. On 6 May 2011 it was reported that Ahmadinejad had been given an ultimatum to accept the leader's intervention or resign, and on 8 May he "apparently bowed" to the reinstatement, welcoming back Moslehi to a cabinet meeting. The events have been said to have "humiliated and weakened" Ahmadinejad, though the president has denied that there was any rift between the two, and according to the semiofficial Fars News Agency stated that his relationship with the supreme leader "is that of a father and a son."

== Foreign relations ==
=== Relations with the United States ===
During Ahmadinejad's presidency, Iran and the US have had the most high-profile contact in almost 30 years. Iran and the US froze diplomatic relations in 1980 and had no direct diplomatic contact until May 2007.

While the U.S. has linked its support for a Palestinian state to acceptance of Israel's "right to exist," Iran's President Mahmoud Ahmadinejad has retorted that Israel should be moved to Europe instead, reiterating Muammar al-Gaddafi's 1990 statement. The U.S. has sent signals to Iran that its posturing against Israel's right to exist is unacceptable in their opinion, leading to increased speculation of a U.S. led attack on Iran's nuclear facilities. Even though Iran has denied involvement in Iraq, then-President Bush warned of "consequences," sending a clear message to Iran that the U.S. may take military action against it. The Bush administration considered Iran to be the world's leading state supporter of terrorism. Iran has been on the U.S. list of state sponsors of international terrorism since 1984, a claim that Iran and Ahmadinejad have denied.

On 8 May 2006, Ahmadinejad sent a personal letter to then-President Bush to propose "new ways" to end Iran's nuclear dispute. U.S. Secretary of State Condoleezza Rice and National Security Adviser Stephen Hadley both reviewed the letter and dismissed it as a negotiating ploy and publicity stunt that did not address U.S. concerns about Iran's nuclear program. A few days later at a meeting in Jakarta, Ahmadinejad said, "the letter was an invitation to monotheism and justice, which are common to all divine prophets."

Ahmadinejad invited Bush to a debate at the United Nations General Assembly, which was to take place on 19 September 2006. The debate was to be about Iran's right to enrich uranium. The invitation was rejected by White House spokesman Tony Snow, who said "There's not going to be a steel-cage grudge match between the President and Ahmadinejad."

In November 2006, Ahmadinejad wrote an open letter to the American people, representing some of his anxieties and concerns. He stated that there is an urgency to have a dialog because of the activities of the US administration in the Middle East, and that the US is concealing the truth about current realities.

The United States Senate passed a resolution warning Iran about attacks in Iraq. On 26 September 2007, the United States Senate passed a resolution 76–22 and labeled an arm of the Iranian military as a terrorist organization.

In September 2007 Ahmadinejad visited New York to address the General Assembly of the United Nations. On the same trip, Columbia University invited Ahmadinejad to visit and participate in a debate. The invitation was a controversial one for the university, as was university president Lee Bollinger's introduction in which he described the Iranian leader as a "cruel and petty dictator" and his views as "astonishingly uneducated." Taking questions from Columbia faculty and students who attended his address, Ahmadinejad answered a series of questions, including a query about the treatment of gays in Iran by saying: "We don't have homosexuals like in your country. We don't have that in our country. We don't have this phenomenon; I don't know who's told you we have it." An aide later claimed that he was misrepresented and was actually saying that "compared to American society, we don't have many homosexuals".

In a speech given in April 2008, Ahmadinejad described the 11 September 2001 attacks as a "suspect event." He minimized the attacks by saying all that had happened was, "a building collapsed." He claimed that the death toll was never published, that the victims' names were never published, and that the attacks were used subsequently as pretext for the invasions of Afghanistan and Iraq.

In October 2008, President Ahmadinejad expressed his happiness of the 2008 financial crisis and what he called "collapse of liberalism". He said the West has been driven to deadend and that Iran was proud "to put an end to liberal economy". Ahmadinejad used a September 2008 speech to the General Assembly of the United Nations to assert the American empire is soon going to end without specifying how. "The American empire in the world is reaching the end of its road, and its next rulers must limit their interference to their own borders," Ahmadinejad said.

On 6 November 2008 (two days after the 2008 US Presidential Election), President Mahmoud Ahmadinejad congratulated Barack Obama, the newly elected President of the United States, and said that he "Welcomes basic and fair changes in U.S. policies and conducts, I hope you will prefer real public interests and justice to the never-ending demands of a selfish minority and seize the opportunity to serve people so that you will be remembered with high esteem". It was the first congratulatory message to a newly elected president of the United States by an Iranian President since the 1979 Iranian Hostage Crisis.

=== Relations with Israel ===
On 26 October 2005 Ahmadinejad gave a speech at a conference in Tehran entitled "World Without Zionism". According to widely published translations, he agreed with a statement he attributed to Ayatollah Khomeini that the "occupying regime" had to be removed, and referred to it as a "disgraceful stain [on] the Islamic world", that needed to be "wiped from the pages of history."

Ahmadinejad's comments were condemned by major Western governments, the European Union, Russia, the United Nations Security Council and then UN Secretary General Kofi Annan. Egyptian, Turkish and Palestinian leaders also expressed displeasure over Ahmadinejad's remark. Canada's then Prime Minister Paul Martin said, "this threat to Israel's existence, this call for genocide coupled with Iran's obvious nuclear ambitions is a matter that the world cannot ignore."

The translation of his statement has been disputed. Iran's foreign minister stated that Ahmadinejad had been "misunderstood": "He is talking about the regime. We do not recognise legally this regime." Some experts state that the phrase in question (بايد از صفحه روزگار محو شود) is more accurately translated as "eliminated" or "wiped off" or "wiped away" (lit. "should disappear") from "the page of time" or "the pages of history", rather than "wiped off the map". Reviewing the controversy over the translation, New York Times deputy foreign editor Ethan Bronner observed that "all official translations" of the comments, including the foreign ministry and president's office, "refer to wiping Israel away". Dr. Joshua Teitelbaum, an Israel-based professor with ties to the American Israel Public Affairs Committee, in a paper for the Jerusalem Center for Public Affairs, examined the language that President Ahmadinejad has used when discussing Israel. Using Persian translations from Dr. Denis MacEoin, a former lecturer in Islamic studies in the United Kingdom, Teitelbaum wrote that "the Iranian president was not just calling for "regime change" in Jerusalem, but rather the actual physical destruction of the State of Israel," and asserted that Ahmadinejad was advocating the genocide of its residents as well. Teitelbaum said that in a speech given on 26 October 2005, Ahmadinejad said the following about Israel: "Soon this stain of disgrace will be cleaned from the garment of the world of Islam, and this is attainable." Teitelbaum said that this type of dehumanizing rhetoric is a documented prelude to genocide incitement. Dr. Juan Cole, a professor of modern Middle Eastern and South Asian history at the University of Michigan, has argued that Ahmadinejad was not calling for the destruction of Israel, "Ahmadinejad did not say he was going to wipe Israel off the map because no such idiom exists in Persian." Dr. Stephen Walt, a professor of international affairs at Harvard University has said "I don’t think he is inciting to genocide." According to Gawdat Bahgat of the National Defense University, "the fiery calls to destroy Israel are meant to mobilize domestic and regional constituencies" and that "Rhetoric aside, most analysts agree that the Islamic Republic and the Jewish state are not likely to engage in a military confrontation against each other."

In July 2006, Ahmadinejad compared Israel's actions in the 2006 Israel-Lebanon conflict to Adolf Hitler's actions during World War II saying that "like Hitler, the Zionist regime is just looking for a pretext for launching military attacks" and "is now acting just like him." On 8 August 2006, he gave a television interview to Mike Wallace, a correspondent for 60 Minutes, in which he questioned American support of Israel's "murderous regime" and the moral grounds for Israel's invasion of Lebanon. On 2 December 2006, Ahmadinejad met with Palestinian Prime Minister Ismail Haniyah in Doha, Qatar. At that meeting, he said that Israel "was created to establish dominion of arrogant states over the region and to enable the enemy to penetrate the heart Muslim land." He called Israel a "threat" and said it was created to create tensions in and impose US and UK policies upon the region. On 12 December 2006, Ahmadinejad addressed the International Conference to Review the Global Vision of the Holocaust, and made comments about the future of Israel. He said, "Israel is about to crash. This is God's promise and the wish of all the world's nations."

When CNN's Larry King asked Ahmadinejad "does Israel remain Israel" in his version of the Middle East, Ahmadinejad suggested that throughout the Palestinian territories free elections for all be conducted under the supervision of international organizations. Ahmadinejad suggested that "...we must allow free elections to happen in Palestine under the supervision of the United Nations. And the Palestinian people, the displaced Palestinian people, or whoever considers Palestine its land, can participate in free elections. And then whatever happens as a result could happen."

=== Relations with Russia ===
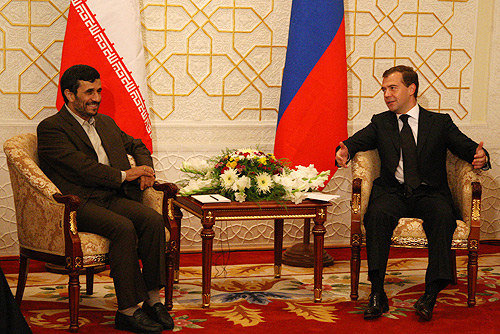
Ahmadinejad with President of Russia Dmitry Medvedev in Moscow on 28 August 2008.

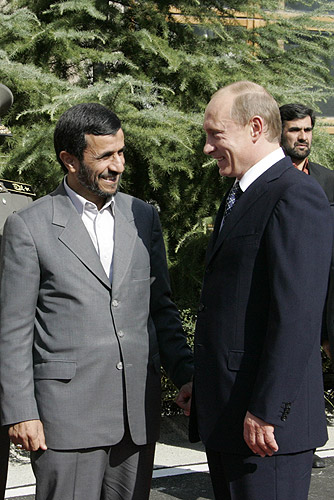
Ahmadinejad with then president of Russia Vladimir Putin in Tehran on 16 October 2007.

Ahmadinejad has moved to strengthen relations with Russia, setting up an office expressly dedicated to the purpose in October 2005. He has worked with Vladimir Putin on the nuclear issue, and both Putin and Ahmadinejad have expressed a desire for more mutual cooperation on issues involving the Caspian Sea. More recently, Iran has been increasingly pushed into an alliance with Moscow due to the controversy over Iran's nuclear program. By late December 2007, Russia began to deliver enriched batches of nuclear fuel to Iran as a way of persuading Iran to end self-enrichment.

=== Relations with Venezuela ===
Ahmadinejad has sought to develop ties with other world leaders that are also opposed to U.S. foreign policy and influence like Hugo Chavez of Venezuela. Venezuela voted in favor of Iran's nuclear program before the United Nations, and both governments have sought to develop more bilateral trade. As of 2006, the ties between the two countries are strategic rather than economic; Venezuela is still not one of Iran's major trading partners.

=== Regional relations ===
Immediately after the Islamic Revolution, Iran's relations with most of its neighbors, particularly those with large Shi'a minorities, were severely strained. Ahmadinejad's priority in the region has been to improve ties with most of Iran's neighbors in order to strengthen Iran's status and influence in both the Middle East and Greater Muslim World.

Turkey has always been important in the region due to its ties to the West through NATO, Israel, and its potential entry into the European Union. Ahmadinejad visited Ankara to reinforce relations with Turkey immediately after the 2007 NIE report was released. Relations were briefly strained after President Abdullah Gul had stated that he wants the atomic threat to be eliminated from the region, perhaps a hint to Iran; however, business has remained cordial between the two countries. Despite US disapproval, they signed a multibillion-dollar gas pipeline deal in late 2007.

Iran's relations with the Arab states have been complex, partly due to the Islamic Revolution of decades ago, as well as more recent efforts by the United States to establish a united front against Iran over the nuclear issue and war on terror. Ahmadinejad has sought reconciliation with the Arab states by encouraging bilateral trade and posturing for Iranian entry into the Gulf Cooperation Council. Outside the Persian Gulf, Ahmadinejad has sought to reestablish relations with other major Arab states, most notably Egypt. As of 2007, Iran did not have an open embassy there.

Iran's ties to Syria have been most notable in the West. Both nations have had to deal with international and regional isolation. Both have cordial ties to the militant group, Hezbollah, and concerns over Iran-Syria relations were further exacerbated following the 2006 Lebanon War, which both Ahmadinejad and President Assad claimed as a victory over Israel.

Ahmadinejad has also tried to develop stronger, more intimate ties with both Afghanistan and Pakistan, to ensure "regional stability." In particular, Ahmadinejad is interested in more bilateral talks between Iran and both Afghanistan and Pakistan. His administration has helped establish the "peace pipeline" from Iran that will eventually fuel both Pakistan and India. In theory, the plan will help to integrate South Asian economies, and, thus to calm tensions between Pakistan and India.

Ahmadinejad met foreign minister Elmar Mammadyarov of Azerbaijan to discuss increased cooperation between the two nations. Mammadyarov also expressed desire to expand the north–south corridor between Iran and Azerbaijan and to launch cooperative projects for power plant construction. Iran has also redoubled efforts to forge ties with Armenia; during Ahmadinejad's visit in October 2007 the discussions were focused on developing energy ties between the two countries.

==== Afghanistan ====
Due to the similar culture and language Iran has with Afghanistan, the two countries have historically been close and, even though the US has a military presence in Afghanistan, President Hamid Karzai of Afghanistan maintains he wants Iran to be one of its closest allies. At Camp David in August 2007, Karzai rejected the U.S. claim that Iran backs Afghan militants. Karzai described Iran as "a helper and a solution," and "a supporter of Afghanistan", both in "the fight against terror, and the fight against narcotics". He called relations between Afghanistan and Iran "very, very good, very, very close ". Iran is also the largest regional donor to Afghanistan. Al-Arabiya television, considered by many Western sources as a more neutral Middle Eastern media network, said "Shi'a Iran has close ethnic and religious ties with Afghanistan."

==== Iraq ====
Ahmadinejad was the first Iranian president to visit Iraq. Ahmadinejad, in Baghdad 2 March 2008 for the start of a historic two-day trip, said that "visiting Iraq without the dictator Saddam Hussein is a good thing." Heading home after a two-day visit to Iraq, Ahmadinejad again touted his country's closer relations with Iraq and reiterated his criticism of the United States.

=== United Nations ===
On 23 September 2009, Ahmadinejad gave a speech to the UN General Assembly which focused on accusing Western powers of spreading "war, bloodshed, aggression, terror and intimidation" in the Middle East and Afghanistan. He also promised that Tehran was "prepared to warmly shake all those hands which are honestly extended to us". But he accused the West of hypocrisy - saying it preached democracy yet violated its fundamental principles - and added that it was time for the world to respond.

"The awakening of nations and the expansion of freedom worldwide will no longer allow them to continue their hypocrisy and vicious attitudes," he said.

He also spoke out against Israel for its "barbaric" attack on the Gaza Strip, "inhuman policies" in the Palestinian territories and what he called its domination of world political and economic affairs.the end of which focused largely on the plight of the people of Palestine and a blaming of Israel, though without mentioning the nation or Jews, referring only to "the occupiers" and "the Zionist regime".

"How can the crimes of the occupiers against defenseless women and children... be supported unconditionally by certain governments," Ahmadinejad asked. "And at the same time, the oppressed men and women be subject to genocide and heaviest economic blockade being denied their basic needs, food, water and medicine?"

"It is no longer acceptable that a small minority would dominate the politics, economy and culture of major parts of the world by its complicated networks," he added. And he accused the so-called Zionist regime of seeking to "establish a new form of slavery, and harm the reputation of other nations, even European nations and the US, to attain its racist ambitions." His remarks culminated in France leading a walkout of a dozen delegations, including the United States in protest. "It is disappointing that Mr Ahmadinejad has once again chosen to espouse hateful, offensive and anti-Semitic rhetoric," Mark Kornblau, spokesman to the US mission to the United Nations, said in a statement. Delegations from Argentina, Australia, Britain, Costa Rica, Denmark, France, Germany, Hungary, Italy, New Zealand and the United States left the room as Ahmadinejad began to rail against Israel. Israel had already called for a boycott of the speech, and was not present when the Iranian leader began his address. Canada had already said it would heed the boycott call.

== Allegations of Holocaust denial and anti-Semitism ==
=== Controversies ===
On 14 December 2005, Ahmadinejad made several controversial statements about the Holocaust, repeatedly referring to it as a "myth," as well as criticizing European laws against Holocaust denial. According to a report from Islamic Republic of Iran Broadcasting, Ahmadinejad said, referring to Europeans, "Today, they have created a myth in the name of Holocaust and consider it to be above God, religion and the prophets." The quote has also translated as "They have created a myth today that they call the massacre of Jews and they consider it a principle above God, religions and the prophets."

In a 30 May 2006 interview with Der Spiegel, Ahmadinejad insisted there were "two opinions" on the Holocaust. When asked if the Holocaust was a myth, he responded "I will only accept something as truth if I am actually convinced of it." He also said, "We are of the opinion that, if a historical occurrence conforms to the truth, this truth will be revealed all the more clearly if there is more research into it and more discussion about it". He then argued that "most" scholars who recognized the existence of the Holocaust are "politically motivated," stating that:

"...there are two opinions on this in Europe. One group of scholars or persons, most of them politically motivated, say the Holocaust occurred. Then there is the group of scholars who represent the opposite position and have therefore been imprisoned for the most part."

In August 2006, the Iranian leader was reported to have again cast doubt on the existence of the Holocaust, this time in a letter to German Chancellor Angela Merkel, where he wrote that the Holocaust may have been invented by the Allied powers to embarrass Germany. During the same month, in a public speech that aired on the Iranian News Channel (IRINN), Ahmadinejad reportedly implied that Zionists may not be human beings, saying "They have no boundaries, limits, or taboos when it comes to killing human beings. Who are they? Where did they come from? Are they human beings? ‘They are like cattle, nay, more misguided.’"

On 11 December 2006 the "International Conference to Review the Global Vision of the Holocaust" was held in Iran. The conference was called for by and held at the request of Ahmadinejad. Western media widely condemned the conference and described it as a "Holocaust denial conference" or a "meeting of Holocaust deniers", though Iran maintained that it was not a Holocaust denial conference, commenting the conference was meant to "create an opportunity for thinkers who cannot express their views freely in Europe about the Holocaust".

In his September 2007 appearance at Columbia University, Ahmadinejad stated "I'm not saying that it didn't happen at all. This is not judgment that I'm passing here" and that the Holocaust should be left open to debate and research like any other historical event.

At the 18 September 2009 Quds Day ceremonies in Tehran, he stated that "the pretext for establishing the Zionist regime is a lie, a lie which relies on an unreliable claim, a mythical claim, (as) the occupation of Palestine has nothing to do with the Holocaust". He also referred to the Holocaust as a sealed "black box" asking why western powers refuse permission for the claim to be "examined and surveyed". — what the New York Times considered "among his harshest statements on the topic," and one immediately condemned by the US, UK, French and German governments. Widely interpreted as referring to the Holocaust, the media have been criticized for lack of objectivity by reporting the quote without context as it could equally be interpreted as referring to Israel's Biblical claims to the land of Palestine.

In response to some of Ahmadinejad's controversial statements and actions, a variety of sources, including the U.S. Senate, have accused Ahmadinejad of anti-Semitism. Ahmadinejad's September 2008 speech to the UN General Assembly, in which he dwelled on what he described as Zionist control of international finance, was also denounced as "blatant anti-Semitism" by German Foreign Minister Frank-Walter Steinmeier.

American President Barack Obama posed a direct challenge to Ahmadinejad during his June 2009 visit to Buchenwald concentration camp, saying that Ahmadinejad "should make his own visit" to the camp and that "[t]his place is the ultimate rebuke to such thoughts, a reminder of our duty to confront those who would tell lies about our history".

In October 2008, Ahmadinejad's statements on the Holocaust were criticized within Iran by cleric and presidential hopeful Mahdi Karroubi.

Khamenei's main adviser in foreign policy, Ali Akbar Velayati, refused to take part in Ahmadinejad's Holocaust conference. In contrast to Ahmadinejad's remarks, Velayati said that the Holocaust was a genocide and a historical reality.

=== Response to allegations ===
Ahmadinejad has denied allegations of Holocaust denial and acknowledged that it seems the West is right in its claim of the Holocaust:

"If the Europeans are telling the truth in their claim that they have killed six million Jews in the Holocaust during the World War II – which seems they are right in their claim because they insist on it and arrest and imprison those who oppose it, why the Palestinian nation should pay for the crime. Why have they come to the very heart of the Islamic world and are committing crimes against the dear Palestine using their bombs, rockets, missiles and sanctions.

Ahmadinejad has said he respects Jews and that "in Palestine there are Muslims, Christians and Jews who live together". He added, "We love everyone in the world – Jews, Christians, Muslims, non-Muslims, non-Jews, non-Christians... We are against occupation, aggression, killings and displacing people – otherwise we have no problem with ordinary people." Ahmadinejad has further said the Jewish community in Iran has its own independent member of parliament. Ahmadinejad has argued Zionists are "neither Jews nor Christians nor Muslims", and has asked "How can you possibly be religious and occupy the land of other people?"

Shiraz Dossa, a professor at St. Francis Xavier University, in Nova Scotia, Canada, argued in June 2007 that

Ahmadinejad has not denied the Holocaust or proposed Israel’s liquidation; he has never done so in any of his speeches on the subject (all delivered in Persian). As an Iran specialist, I can attest that both accusations are false... What Ahmadinejad has questioned is the mythologizing, the sacralization, of the Holocaust and the "Zionist regime’s" continued killing of Palestinians and Muslims. He has even raised doubts about the scale of the Holocaust. His rhetoric has been excessive and provocative. And he does not really care what we in the West think about Iran or Muslims; he does not kowtow to western or Israeli diktat.

Dossa was criticized in Canadian media, by university president Sean Riley, and by 105 professors at his university for his attendance at Tehran's Holocaust conference. Dossa replied he did not know Holocaust deniers would be in attendance, that he has "never denied the Holocaust, only noted its propaganda power", and that the university should respect his academic freedom to participate.

== Cabinet members ==
Ministry	Minister	Time in office
President	Mahmoud Ahmadinejad	2005–13
First Vice President	Parviz Davoodi	2005–09
	Esfandiar Rahim Mashaei	2009
	Mohammad-Reza Rahimi	2009–13
Foreign Affairs	Manouchehr Mottaki	2005–10
	Ali Akbar Salehi	2010–13
Agricultural	Mohammad-Reza Eskandari	2005–09
	Sadeq Khalilian	2009–13
Commerce	Masoud Mir Kazemi	2005–09
	Mehdi Ghazanfari	2009–11
ICT	Mohammad Soleimani	2005–09
	Reza Taghipour	2009–13
Cooperatives	Mohammad Ardakani	2005–06
	Mohammad Abbasi	2006–11
Cooperatives, Labour and Welfare	Reza Sheykholeslam	2011–13
	Asadollah Abbasi	2013
Culture	Hossein Saffar Harandi	2005–09
	Mohammad Hosseini	2009–13
Defense	Mostafa Mohammad-Najjar	2005–09
	Ahmad Vahidi	2009–13
Economy	Davoud Danesh-Jafari	2005–08
	Shamseddin Hosseini	2008–13
Education	Mahmoud Farshidi	2005–07
	Alireza Ali Ahmadi	2007–09
	Hamid-Reza Haji Babaee	2009–13
Energy	Parviz Fattah	2005–09
	Majid Namjoo	2009–13
Health	Kamran Bagheri Lankarani	2005–09
	Marzieh Vahid-Dastjerdi	2009–13
	Hassan Monfared	2013
HUD	Mohammad Saeedikia	2005–09
	Ali Nikzad	2009–11
Industrial	Ali-Reza Tahmasbi	2005–07
	Aliakbar Mehrabian	2007–11
Industries and Business	Mehdi Ghazanfari	2011–13
Intelligence	Gholam-Hossein Mohseni-Eje'i	2005–09
	Heydar Moslehi	2009–13
Interior	Mostafa Pour-Mohammadi	2005–08
	Ali Kordan	2008
	Sadegh Mahsouli	2008–09
	Mostafa Mohammad-Najjar	2009–13
Justice	Jamal Karimi-Rad	2005–06
	Gholam-Hossein Elham	2006–09
	Morteza Bakhtiari	2009–13
Labour	Mohammad Jahromi	2005–09
	Reza Sheykholeslam	2009–11
Petroleum	Kazem Vaziri	2005–07
	Gholam Hossein Nozari	2007–09
	Masoud Mir Kazemi	2009–11
	Rostam Ghasemi	2011–13
Roads	Mohammad Rahmati	2005–08
	Hamid Behbahani	2008–11
Science	Mohammad Mehdi Zahedi	2005–09
	Kamran Daneshjoo	2009–13
Transportation and Housing	Ali Nikzad	2011–13
Welfare	Parviz Kazemi	2005
	Abdul-Reza Misri	2005–09
	Sadegh Mahsouli	2009–11
Sports	Mohammad Abbasi	2011–13

Iran's president is constitutionally obliged to obtain confirmation from the parliament for his selection of ministers. Ahmadinejad presented a short-list at a private meeting on 5 August, and his final list on 14 August. The Majlis rejected all of his cabinet candidates for the oil portfolio and objected to the appointment of his allies in senior government office. The Majlis approved a cabinet on 24 August. The ministers promised to meet frequently outside Tehran and held their first meeting on 25 August in Mashhad, with four empty seats for the unapproved nominees.

Ahmadinejad announced controversial ministerial appointments for his second term. Esfandiar Rahim Mashaei was briefly appointed as first vice president, but opposed by a number of Majlis members and by the intelligence minister, Gholam-Hossein Mohseni-Eje'i. Mashaei followed orders to resign. Ahmadinejad then appointed Mashaei as chief of staff, and fired Mohseni-Eje'i.

On 26 July 2009, Ahmadinejad's government faced a legal problem after he sacked four ministers. Iran's constitution (Article 136) stipulates that, if more than half of its members are replaced, the cabinet may not meet or act before the Majlis approves the revised membership. The Vice Chairman of the Majlis announced that no cabinet meetings or decisions would be legal, pending such a re-approval.

The main list of 21 cabinet appointments was announced on 19 August 2009. On 4 September, Majlis approved 18 of the 21 candidates, and rejected three, including two women. Sousan Keshavarz, Mohammad Aliabadi, and Fatemeh Ajorlou were not approved by Majlis for the Ministries of Education, Energy, and Welfare and Social Security respectively. Marzieh Vahid Dastjerdi was the first woman approved by Majlis as a minister in the Islamic Republic of Iran. During the second term of Ahmedinejad, nine cabinet member were dismissed by the Majlis until February 2013.

== See also ==
- Cabinet of Iran

Presidential terms of Iran
Preceded by Presidency of Khatami	Presidency of Ahmadinejad; 2005–2013	Succeeded by Presidency of Rouhani
