= First government of Mahmoud Ahmadinejad =

Government of the Iranian President

First Mahmoud Ahmadinejad Cabinet
- 9th Cabinet of Islamic Republic of Iran
- President of Iran
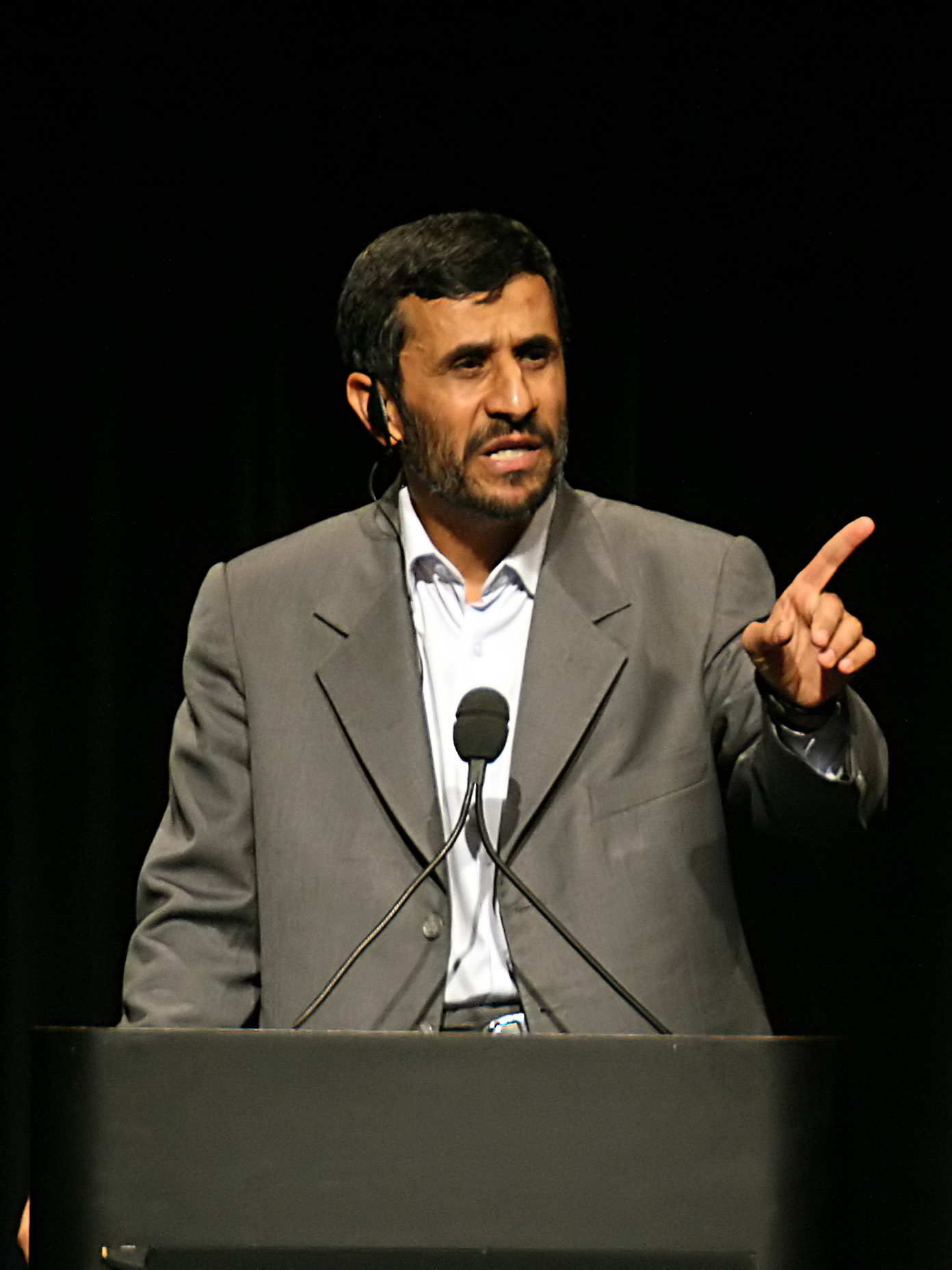
- Ahmadinejad at Columbia University, 2007
- Date formed: 3 August 2005
- Date dissolved: 3 August 2009

People and organisations
- Head of state: Ali Khamenei
- Head of government: Mahmoud Ahmadinejad
- Head of government's history: List: Mayor of Tehran (2003–05); Ardabil Governor-general (1993–97)
- Deputy head of government: Parviz Davoodi
- No. of ministers: 21
- Ministers removed: 11
- Total no. of members: 32

History
- Election: Iranian presidential election, 2005
- Legislature term: 7th term 8th term
- Predecessor: Khatami II
- Successor: Ahmadinejad II

The cabinet headed by Mahmoud Ahmadinejad from 2005 to 2009 included the following members:

== Cabinet ==
Cabinet members
Portfolio	Minister	Took office	Left office	Party	Ref
Presidential Administration
President	Mahmoud Ahmadinejad	3 August 2005	3 August 2009	ABII	
First Vice President	Parviz Davoodi	24 August 2005	17 July 2009	Nonpartisan	
First Vice President	Esfandiar Rahim Mashaei	17 July 2009	24 July 2009	CPSS	
Head of President's Office	Gholam-Hossein Elham	10 August 2005	17 February 2007	Nonpartisan	
Head of President's Office	Reza Sheykholeslam	17 February 2007	25 July 2009	CPSS	
Chief of Staff	Ali Saeedlou	September 2005	19 September 2009	ABII	
Spokesperson	Gholam-Hossein Elham	7 August 2005	25 July 2009	Nonpartisan	
Secretary	Masoud Zaribafan	12 September 2005	10 December 2006	SDIR	
Secretary	Majid Doust-Ali	13 July 2007	3 August 2009	Nonpartisan	
Ministers
Minister of Education	Ali-Asghar Fani (head of ministry)	12 September 2005	9 November 2005	Nonpartisan	
Minister of Education	Mahmoud Farshidi	9 November 2005	1 December 2007	SDIR	
Minister of Education	Alireza Ali-Ahmadi (Note: Acting from 1 December 2007 to 19 February 2008)	1 December 2007	3 September 2009	SDIR	
Minister of Communications	Mohammad Soleimani	24 August 2005	3 September 2009	Nonpartisan	
Minister of Intelligence	Gholam-Hossein Mohseni-Eje'i	24 August 2005	23 July 2009	Nonpartisan	
Minister of Intelligence	Mahmoud Ahmadinejad (head of ministry)	25 July 2009	3 August 2009	SDIR	
Minister of Finance	Davoud Danesh-Jafari	24 August 2005	2 April 2008	SDIR	
Minister of Finance	Hossein Samsami (head of ministry)	20 April 2008	5 August 2008	Nonpartisan	
Minister of Finance	Shamseddin Hosseini	5 August 2008	3 September 2009	Nonpartisan	
Minister of Foreign Affairs	Manouchehr Mottaki	24 August 2005	3 September 2009	FFLIL	
Minister of Commerce	Masoud Mir-Kazemi	24 August 2005	3 September 2009	Military	
Minister of Health	Kamran Bagheri Lankarani	24 August 2005	3 September 2009	Nonpartisan	
Minister of Cooperatives	Mohammad Ardakani (Note: Acting from 27 August to 9 November 2005)	27 August 2005	28 October 2006	Islamic Engineers	
Minister of Cooperatives	Mohammad Abbasi	5 November 2006	3 September 2009	Nonpartisan	
Minister of Agriculture	Mohammad-Reza Eskandari	24 August 2005	3 September 2009	Military	
Minister of Justice	Jamal Karimi-Rad	24 August 2005	28 December 2006	Nonpartisan	
Minister of Justice	Gholam-Hossein Elham (Note: Acting from 28 December 2006 to 13 February 2007)	28 December 2006	3 September 2009	Nonpartisan	
Minister of Defence	Mostafa Mohammad-Najjar	24 August 2005	3 September 2009	Military	
Minister of Roads	Mohammad Rahmati	24 August 2005	12 July 2008	Military	
Minister of Roads	Hamid Behbahani	5 August 2008	3 September 2009	Nonpartisan	
Minister of Welfare	Davoud Madadi (head of ministry)	27 August 2005	9 November 2005	Nonpartisan	
Minister of Welfare	Parviz Kazemi	9 November 2005	25 September 2006	Nonpartisan	
Minister of Welfare	Ali Yousefpour (head of ministry)	25 September 2006	29 October 2006	SDIR	
Minister of Welfare	Abdolreza Mesri	29 October 2006	3 September 2009	ICP	
Minister of Industries	Alireza Tahmasbi	24 August 2005	5 August 2007	Military	
Minister of Industries	Ali Akbar Mehrabian (Note: Acting from 12 August to 2 November 2007)	12 August 2007	3 September 2009	Nonpartisan	
Minister of Science	Mohammad Mehdi Zahedi	24 August 2005	3 September 2009	Nonpartisan	
Minister of Culture	Hossein Saffar Harandi	24 August 2005	26 July 2009	Military	
Minister of Culture	Mohammad-Ali Khajeh-Piri (head of ministry)	26 July 2009	3 September 2009	Nonpartisan	
Minister of Interior	Mostafa Pourmohammadi	24 August 2005	May 2008	CCA	
Minister of Interior	Seyyed Mehdi Hashemi (head of ministry)	15 May 2008	5 August 2008	Military	
Minister of Interior	Ali Kordan	5 August 2008	4 November 2008	Nonpartisan	
Minister of Interior	Kamran Daneshjoo (head of ministry)	4 November 2008	24 December 2008	FPP	
Minister of Interior	Sadegh Mahsouli	24 December 2008	3 September 2009	Nonpartisan	
Minister of Labour	Mohammad Jahromi	24 August 2005	3 September 2009	Nonpartisan	
Minister of Housing	Mohammad Saeedikia	24 August 2005	3 September 2009	Nonpartisan	
Minister of Petroleum	Kazem Vaziri Hamaneh (Note: Acting from 31 August to 11 December 2005)	31 August 2005	12 August 2007	Nonpartisan	
Minister of Petroleum	Gholam-Hossein Nozari (Note: Acting from 12 August to 14 November 2007)	12 August 2007	3 September 2009	Nonpartisan	
Minister of Energy	Parviz Fattah	24 August 2005	3 September 2009	Military	
Vice Presidents
Executive Vice President	Ali Saeedlou	10 September 2005	25 August 2009	ABII	
Planning and Supervision Vice President	Amir-Mansour Borghe'i	18 July 2007	17 July 2009	Nonpartisan	
Parliamentary and Legal Affairs; Vice President	Seyyed Ahmad Mousavi	30 August 2005	16 January 2008	Nonpartisan	
Parliamentary and Legal Affairs; Vice President	Majid Jafarzadeh (head of ministry)	16 January 2008	25 May 2008	Nonpartisan	
Parliamentary and Legal Affairs; Vice President	Mohammad Reza Rahimi	25 May 2008	13 September 2009	Nonpartisan	
Management Development and Human Capital Vice President	Amir-Mansour Borghe'i (head of ministry)	18 July 2007	21 October 2007	Nonpartisan	
Management Development and Human Capital Vice President	Ebrahim Azizi	21 October 2007	17 July 2009	Nonpartisan	
Martyrs Vice President	Hossein Dehghan	3 August 2005	17 July 2009	Military	
Elites Vice President	Parviz Davoodi	9 April 2006	21 January 2007	Nonpartisan	
Elites Vice President	Sadegh Vaez-Zadeh	4 February 2007	21 September 2009	Nonpartisan	
Atomic Energy Vice President	Gholam Reza Aghazadeh	3 August 2005	17 July 2009	ECP	
Physical Education Vice President	Mohammad Aliabadi	25 September 2005	25 August 2009	ABII	
Environment Vice President	Fatemeh Javadi	7 September 2005	2 September 2009	ABII	
Management and Planning; Vice President	Farhad Rahbar	September 2005	15 November 2006	Nonpartisan	
Management and Planning; Vice President	Amir-Mansour Borghe'i	15 November 2006	9 July 2007	Nonpartisan	
National Youth Vice President	Mohammad-Javad Haj-AliAkbari	2005	24 July 2009	Nonpartisan	
Cultural Heritage Vice President	Esfandiar Rahim Mashaei	18 August 2005	17 July 2009	CPSS	
* Acting

Cabinet of Iran
Preceded by Second Government of Khatami	First Government of Ahmadinejad	Succeeded by Second Government of Ahmadinejad
