= Second government of Mahmoud Ahmadinejad =

Government of the Iranian President

Second Mahmoud Ahmadinejad Cabinet
- 10th Cabinet of Islamic Republic of Iran
- President
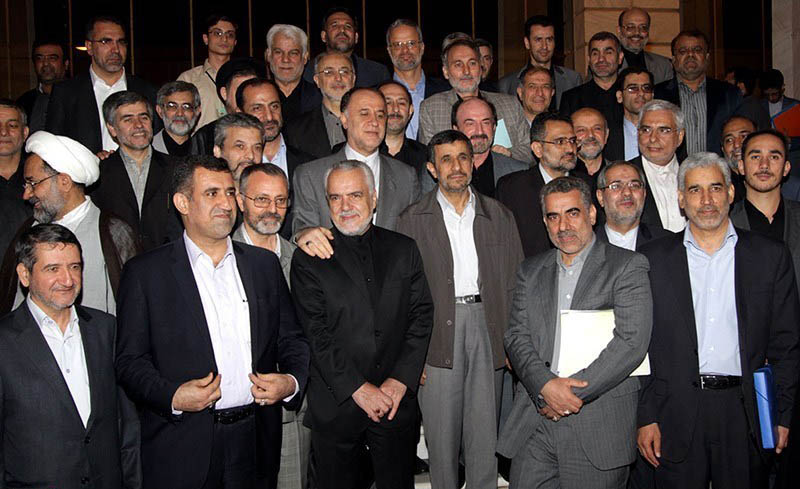
- Last meeting of cabinet, 31 July 2013
- Date formed: 3 August 2009
- Date dissolved: 3 August 2013

People and organisations
- Head of state: Ali Khamenei
- Head of government: Mahmoud Ahmadinejad
- Head of government's history: List: President (2005-09); Mayor of Tehran (2003–05); Ardabil Province Governor-general (1993–97)
- Deputy head of government: Mohammad Reza Rahimi
- No. of ministers: 21
- Ministers removed: 11
- Total no. of members: 32

History
- Election: 2009 Iranian presidential election
- Legislature term: 8th term 9th term
- Predecessor: Ahmadinejad I
- Successor: Rouhani I

Mahmoud Ahmadinejad was the sixth President of Iran which governed during his second term within the tenth Government of Islamic Republic of Iran.

== 2009 appointments ==
President Ahmadinejad announced controversial ministerial appointments for his second term. Esfandiar Rahim Mashaei was briefly appointed as first vice president, but opposed by a number of Majlis members and by the intelligence minister, Gholam-Hossein Mohseni-Eje'i. Mashaei followed orders to resign. Ahmadinejad then appointed Mashaei as chief of staff, and fired Mohseni-Eje'i.

On 26 July 2009, Ahmadinejad's government faced a legal problem after he sacked four ministers. Iran's constitution (Article 136) stipulates that, if more than half of its members are replaced, the cabinet may not meet or act before the Majlis approves the revised membership. The Vice Chairman of the Majlis announced that no cabinet meetings or decisions would be legal, pending such a reapproval.

The main list of 21 cabinet appointments was announced on 19 August 2009. On 4 September, Parliament of Iran approved 18 of the 21 candidates and rejected three of them, including two women. Sousan Keshavarz, Mohammad Aliabadi, and Fatemeh Ajorlou were not approved by Parliament for the Ministries of Education, Energy, and Welfare and Social Security respectively. Marzieh Vahid-Dastjerdi won approval as health minister, making her Iran's first woman minister since the Islamic revolution.

== 2011 merges and dismissals ==
On 9 May, Ahmedinejad announced Ministries of Petroleum and Energy would merge, as would Industries and Mines with Commerce, and Welfare with Labour. On 13 May, he dismissed Masoud Mir-Kazemi (Minister of Petroleum), Ali Akbar Mehrabian (Minister Industry and Mines) and Sadegh Mahsouli (Minister of Welfare). On 15 May, he was announced he would be caretaker minister of the Petroleum Ministry.

From August 2009 to February 2013, a total of nine ministers in the cabinet was dismissed by the Majlis, the last of who was labor minister, Reza Sheykholeslam at the beginning of February 2013.

== Cabinet ==
The cabinet included the following members:

Cabinet members
Portfolio	Minister	Took office	Left office	Party	Ref
Presidential Administration
President of Iran	Mahmoud Ahmadinejad	3 August 2009	3 August 2013	ABII	
First Vice President	Mohammad Reza Rahimi	13 September 2009	3 August 2013	Nonpartisan	
Head of President's Office	Esfandiar Rahim Mashaei	25 July 2009	1 December 2012	CPSS	
Head of President's Office	Mir-Hassan Mousavi	1 December 2012	3 August 2013	Nonpartisan	
Chief of Staff	Esfandiar Rahim Mashaei	19 September 2009	9 April 2011	CPSS	
Chief of Staff	Hamid Baghaei	9 April 2011	3 August 2013	CPSS	
Economic Affairs Spokesperson	Shamseddin Hosseini	10 January 2010	3 August 2013	Nonpartisan	
Political Affairs Spokesperson	Mohammad Reza Rahimi	10 January 2010	30 November 2012	Nonpartisan	
Spokesperson	Gholam-Hossein Elham	11 December 2012	3 August 2013	FIRS	
Secretary	Majid Doust-Ali	3 August 2009	22 September 2010	Nonpartisan	
Secretary	Ali Sadoughi	22 September 2010	2 September 2013	Nonpartisan	
Ministers
Minister of Education	Ramezan Mohsenpour (head of ministry)	6 September 2009	15 November 2009	Nonpartisan	
Minister of Education	Hamid-Reza Haji Babaee	15 November 2009	15 August 2013	Nonpartisan	
Minister of Communications	Reza Taghipour	3 September 2009	2 December 2012	ABII	
Minister of Communications	Ali Nikzad (head of ministry)	2 December 2012	2 February 2013	Nonpartisan	
Minister of Communications	Mohammad-Hassan Nami (Note: Acting from 2 February to 26 February 2013)	2 February 2013	15 August 2013	Military	
Minister of Intelligence	Heydar Moslehi	3 September 2009	15 August 2013	CPSS	
Minister of Finance	Shamseddin Hosseini	3 September 2009	15 August 2013	Nonpartisan	
Minister of Foreign Affairs	Manouchehr Mottaki	3 September 2009	13 December 2010	FFLIL	
Minister of Foreign Affairs	Ali Akbar Salehi (Note: Acting from 13 December 2010 to 30 January 2011)	13 December 2010	15 August 2013	Nonpartisan	
Minister of Commerce	Mehdi Ghazanfari	3 September 2009	3 August 2011	Nonpartisan	
Minister of Health	Marzieh Vahid-Dastjerdi	3 September 2009	27 December 2012	FFLIL	
Minister of Health	Hassan Tarighat Monfared (Note: Acting from 27 December 2012 to 17 March 2013)	27 December 2012	15 August 2013	SDIR	
Minister of Cooperatives	Mohammad Abbasi	3 September 2009	3 August 2011	Nonpartisan	
Minister of Cooperatives, Labour, and Social Welfare	Reza Sheykholeslam	3 August 2011	3 February 2013	CPSS	
Minister of Cooperatives, Labour, and Social Welfare	Asadollah Abbasi (Note: Acting from 4 February to 5 May 2013)	4 February 2013	15 August 2013	Nonpartisan	
Minister of Agriculture	Sadeq Khalilian	3 September 2009	15 August 2013	Nonpartisan	
Minister of Justice	Morteza Bakhtiari	3 September 2009	15 August 2013	Nonpartisan	
Minister of Defence	Ahmad Vahidi	3 September 2009	15 August 2013	Military	
Minister of Roads	Hamid Behbahani	3 September 2009	1 February 2011	Nonpartisan	
Minister of Roads	Ali Nikzad (head of ministry)	7 February 2011	26 June 2011	Nonpartisan	
Minister of Roads & Urban Development	Ali Nikzad	26 June 2011	15 August 2013	Nonpartisan	
Minister of Welfare	Nad-Ali Olfatpour (head of ministry)	6 September 2009	15 November 2009	Nonpartisan	
Minister of Welfare	Sadegh Mahsouli	15 November 2009	3 August 2011	CPSS	
Minister of Industries	Ali Akbar Mehrabian	3 September 2009	15 May 2011	Nonpartisan	
Minister of Industries	Mehdi Ghazanfari (head of ministry)	15 May 2011	3 August 2011	Nonpartisan	
Minister of Industries, Mines and Business	Mehdi Ghazanfari	3 August 2011	15 August 2013	Nonpartisan	
Minister of Science	Kamran Daneshjoo	3 September 2009	15 August 2013	FPP	
Minister of Culture	Mohammad Hosseini	3 September 2009	15 August 2013	Center for Islamic Iran Academics	
Minister of Labour	Reza Sheykholeslam	3 September 2009	3 August 2011	CPSS	
Minister of Interior	Mostafa Mohammad-Najjar	3 September 2009	15 August 2013	Military	
Minister of Housing	Ali Nikzad	3 September 2009	26 June 2011	Nonpartisan	
Minister of Petroleum	Masoud Mir-Kazemi	3 September 2009	16 May 2011	Military	
Minister of Petroleum	Mahmoud Ahmadinejad (head of ministry)	16 May 2011	2 June 2011	ABII	
Minister of Petroleum	Mohammad Aliabadi (head of ministry)	2 June 2011	3 August 2011	ABII	
Minister of Petroleum	Rostam Ghasemi	3 August 2011	15 August 2013	Military	
Minister of Energy	Majid Namjoo (Note: Acting from 6 September to 15 November 2009)	6 September 2009	15 August 2013	Military	
Minister of Youth Affairs and Sports	Mohammad Abbasi (Note: Acting from 26 June to 3 August 2011)	26 June 2011	15 August 2013	Nonpartisan	
Vice President
Enforcing the Constitution Vice President	Mohammad Reza Mirtajodini	27 May 2012	3 August 2013	Nonpartisan	
Executive Vice President	Hamid Baghaei	9 April 2011	3 August 2013	CPSS	
Foreign Affairs Vice President	Ali Saeedlou	9 August 2011	3 August 2013	ABII	
Women and Family Affairs Vice President	Maryam Mojtahedzadeh	27 July 2013	8 October 2013	Nonpartisan	
Planning and Strategic Supervision; Vice President	Ebrahim Azizi	17 July 2009	27 May 2012	Nonpartisan	
Planning and Strategic Supervision; Vice President	Behrouz Moradi	27 May 2012	3 August 2013	Nonpartisan	
Parliamentary Affairs Vice President	Mohammad Reza Mirtajodini	13 September 2009	27 May 2012	Nonpartisan	
Parliamentary Affairs Vice President	Lotfollah Forouzandeh	27 May 2012	1 September 2013	SDIR	
Management Development and Human Resources Vice President	Lotfollah Forouzandeh	25 October 2009	27 May 2012	SDIR	
Management Development and Human Resources Vice President	Ebrahim Azizi	27 May 2012	26 December 2012	Nonpartisan	
Management Development and Human Resources Vice President	Gholam-Hossein Elham	26 December 2012	3 August 2013	FIRS	
Legal Affairs Vice President	Fatemeh Bodaghi	30 November 2009	11 August 2013	Nonpartisan	
Martyrs Vice President	Masoud Zaribafan	17 July 2009	15 September 2013	SDIR	
Elites Vice President	Nasrin Soltankhah	21 September 2009	5 October 2013	ABII	
Atomic Energy Vice President	Ali Akbar Salehi	17 July 2009	13 December 2010	Nonpartisan	
Atomic Energy Vice President	Mohammad Ahmadian (head of ministry)	13 December 2010	13 February 2011	Nonpartisan	
Atomic Energy Vice President	Fereydoon Abbasi	13 February 2011	15 August 2013	AIRL	
Physical Education Vice President	Ali Saeedlou	25 August 2009	26 June 2011	ABII	
Environment Vice President	Mohammad-Javad Mohammadizadeh	2 September 2009	3 August 2013	ABII	
National Youth Vice President	Mehrdad Bazrpash	24 July 2009	28 November 2010	CPSS	
National Youth Vice President	Homayoun Hamidi (head of ministry)	15 February 2011	26 June 2011	Nonpartisan	
Cultural Heritage Vice President	Hamid Baghaei	19 July 2009	19 May 2011	CPSS	
Cultural Heritage Vice President	Ruhollah Ahmadzadeh	19 May 2011	4 January 2012	Nonpartisan	
Cultural Heritage Vice President	Mir-Hassan Mousavi	4 January 2012	7 December 2012	Nonpartisan	
Cultural Heritage Vice President	Mohammed Sharif Malekzadeh	7 December 2012	3 August 2013	CPSS	
Aides
Senior Aide	Mojtaba Samareh Hashemi	17 July 2009	3 August 2013	ABII	
Special Aide	Ali Akbar Mehrabian	26 December 2011	3 August 2013	Nonpartisan	
* Acting

== See also ==
- Presidency of Mahmoud Ahmadinejad

Cabinet of Iran
Preceded by First Government of Ahmadinejad	Second Government of Ahmadinejad	Succeeded by First Government of Rouhani
