= Morteza Haji =

Iranian politician and teacher

- مرتضی حاجی

Minister of Education
- In office 22 August 2001 – 24 August 2005
- President: Mohammad Khatami
- Preceded by: Hossein Mozaffar
- Succeeded by: Mahmoud Farshidi

Minister of Cooperatives
- In office 20 August 1997 – 22 August 2001
- President: Mohammad Khatami
- Preceded by: Gholamreza Shafeei
- Succeeded by: Ali Soufi

Governor of Mazandaran Province
- In office 20 April 1986 – 16 December 1989
- President: Ali Khamenei
- Prime Minister: Mir-Hossein Mousavi
- Preceded by: Ali-Akbar Tahayi
- Succeeded by: Esmaeil Mofidi
- In office 6 October 1980 – 19 June 1982
- President: Abolhassan Banisadr; Mohammad-Ali Rajai; Ali Khamenei
- Prime Minister: Mohammad-Ali Rajai; Mohammad-Javad Bahonar; Mohammadreza Mahdavi Kani; Mir-Hossein Mousavi
- Preceded by: Abdolali Moshaf
- Succeeded by: Mohammad Majdara

Personal details
- Party: Islamic Iran Participation Front
- Other political affiliations: Islamic Nations Party
- Profession: Math teacher

Morteza Haji (Persian: مرتضی حاجی) is an Iranian reformist politician. He held office as a governor and minister during the 1980s, 1990s and 2000s.

He was head of Mohammad Khatami's presidential campaign in 1997 and a director of the Hassan Rouhani 2017 presidential campaign.

Party political offices
Vacant	Campaign manager of Mohammad Khatami; 1997	Succeeded by Mohsen Aminzadeh
