= Ali Soufi =

Iranian politician

- علی صوفی

Minister of Cooperatives
- In office 22 August 2001 – 24 August 2005
- President: Mohammad Khatami
- Preceded by: Morteza Haji
- Succeeded by: Mohammad Ardakani

Governor of Gilan Province
- In office 8 February 1998 – 11 August 2001
- President: Mohammad Khatami
- Preceded by: Ali-Akbar Tahayi
- Succeeded by: Ali Bagheri (acting)

Governor of Kohgiluyeh & Boyer-Ahmad Province
- In office 1 October 1989 – 12 September 1993
- President: Akbar Hashemi Rafsanjani
- Preceded by: Ahmad Jami (acting)
- Succeeded by: Ahmad Jami (acting)

Governor of Bushehr Province
- In office 19 March 1986 – 1 October 1989
- President: Ali Khamenei
- Prime Minister: Mir-Hossein Mousavi
- Preceded by: Mohammad-Reza Majidi (acting)
- Succeeded by: Gholamreza Sahrayian

Personal details
- Party: Union of Islamic Iran People Party
- Other political affiliations: Islamic Iran Participation Front

Ali Soufi (Persian: علی صوفی) is an Iranian reformist politician. He held various offices as governors and ministers for three decades during the 1980s, 1990s, and 2000s.

He is a member of the 'Reformists' Supreme Council for Policymaking'.

Soufi enrolled to run for parliament in 2008 and 2016 elections but was disqualified by the Guardian Council.
