= Mohsen Aminzadeh =

Iranian politician

- محسن امین‌زاده

Deputy Foreign Minister, Iran
- In office 1997–2005
- President: Mohammad Khatami

Personal details
- Born: July 25, 1957 (age 69) Mashhad, Iran
- Party: Reformists
- Education: Mining Engineering; Political Science
- Alma mater: Amirkabir University of Technology; University of Tehran; Shahid Beheshti University

Mohsen Aminzadeh (Persian: محسن امین‌زاده, born 1957) is an Iranian reformist politician and former diplomat. Aminzadeh was a founding member of the largest reformist party, the Islamic Iran Participation Front. He served as the Deputy Foreign Minister during the 1997-2005 administration of the Iranian president Mohammad Khatami.

Like many other senior reformist politicians, Aminzadeh was arrested in June 2009 for protesting the disputed re-election of president Ahmadinejad and convicted in 2010 of conspiring to "disturb security" and "spreading propaganda" against the Islamic Republic.

== Education ==
Aminzadeh received a B.Sc. in Mining Engineering from Amirkabir University of Technology in 1982. He entered Shahid Beheshti University in late 1990 and studied for a Masters in Political Science. He also has PhD in Political Science from Tehran University.

== Political career ==
In 1988, Aminzadeh was appointed the first head of a department dedicated to the press within the Ministry of Culture. He served as Deputy Foreign Minister from 1997 to 2005 under the reformist administration of Mohammad Khatami.

== Articles and Interviews ==
- ‘This War Will Have Only Losers’
- Iran Faces the World: Mohsen Aminzadeh Outlines His Country's Approach to a Number of International Issues
- Former Iranian Diplomat Condemns Military Ambitions, Suggests Reconciliation With US

== Arrest and imprisonment ==
BBC News and Amnesty International have described him as "a leading member" of the Islamic Iran Participation Front. According to the semiofficial ISNA news agency, Aminzadeh was head of the opposition coalition's headquarters in 2009. He was arrested in June 2009, amidst the 2009 Iranian election protests.

On February 8, 2010, ISNA reported that Aminzadeh had been sentenced to six years in prison by a Revolutionary court – making him one of the most senior of the 100 reform activists and politicians to be sentenced following the mass trial of the postelection crackdown.

According to Aminzadeh's lawyer, Abbas Shiri, his client was convicted of conspiring to "disturb security" and "spreading propaganda" against the regime. He was released on 18 September 2013.

On 8 February 2026, Aminzadeh, along with Azar Mansouri and Ebrahim Asgharzadeh were arrested by Iranian authorities on charges of "targeting national unity, taking a stance against the constitution, coordination with enemy propaganda, promoting surrender, diverting political groups and creating secret subversive mechanisms", in light of the 2025–2026 Iranian protests.

Party political offices
Preceded by Morteza Haji	Campaign manager of Mohammad Khatami; 2001	Succeeded by Mohammad-Reza Aref
