= Marzieh Vahid-Dastjerdi =

Iranian politician (born 1959)

- مرضیه وحید دستجردی
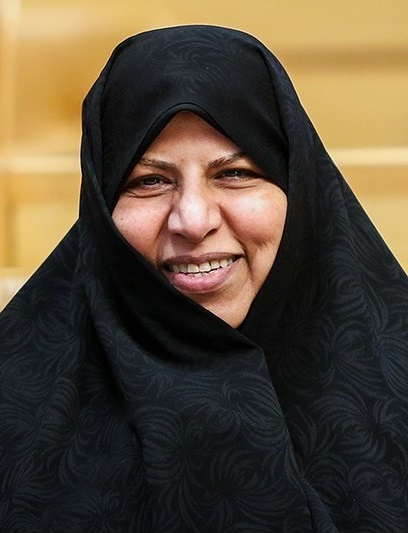

Head of National Population Foundation
- Incumbent
- Assumed office 7 December 2024
- President: Masoud Pezeshkian

Minister of Health and Medical Education
- In office 3 September 2009 – 27 December 2012
- President: Mahmoud Ahmadinejad
- Preceded by: Kamran Bagheri Lankarani
- Succeeded by: Hassan Tarighat Monfared

Member of the Parliament of Iran
- In office 28 May 1992 – 28 May 2000
- Constituency: Tehran, Rey, Shemiranat and Eslamshahr
- Majority: 588,036 (41.1%)

Personal details
- Born: 11 February 1959 (age 67) Tehran, Iran
- Party: Islamic Association of Physicians of Iran; Zeynab Society
- Other political affiliations: Popular Front of Islamic Revolution Forces
- Spouse: Omid Nokhostin
- Children: 2
- Parent: Seifollah Vahid-Dastjerdi (father)
- Relatives: Mohammad Esfahani (cousin)
- Education: Tehran University of Medical Sciences (MD)
- Occupation: Politician, Physician

Marzieh Vahid-Dastjerdi (Persian: مرضیه وحید دستجردی; born 11 February 1959) is an Iranian university professor and former parliamentarian, who was Iran's minister of health and medical education. She was part of President Mahmoud Ahmedinejad's inner circle.

Vahid-Dastjerdi was the first female government minister in Iran since the 1979 Revolution. She is the third female government minister in Iranian history, after Farrokhroo Parsa and Mahnaz Afkhami.

== Early life and education ==
Marzieh Vahid-Dastjerdi was born in Tehran on 11 February 1959. She is the daughter of Seifollah Vahid Dastjerdi, who was head of the Red Crescent Society of Iran.

She entered Tehran University of Medical Sciences in 1976 to study medicine, and qualified in nursing and obstetrics, obtaining a doctoral degree in 1988.

== Medical career ==
Vahid-Dastjerdi was a faculty member at Tehran University for 13 years, and director of the Nursing and Obstetrics Department for six years. She was a founder member of Iran's Specialized Scientific Association of Reproduction and Sterility, and a member of the American Society for Reproductive Medicine (1993–2000). From 2004 to 2009 she headed Arash Hospital.

Vahid-Dastjerdi worked on the organizing committees for prominent conferences on subjects related to medicine. Examples include a Workshop on "Higher Education & Development in Knowledge-Based Society: Towards Enhancing Quality and Relevance in Medical and Professional Education" and the 2nd International Congress of Medical Ethics in Iran which took place in Tehran during April 2008.

She is a member of the editorial board of the Tehran University of Medical Sciences' Journal of Family and Reproductive Health.

== Political career ==
Vahid-Dastjerdi in 1993 jointly founded the Islamic Association of Physicians, a political party. She was elected to the Fourth Majlis (1992–1996) representing Tehran, and re-elected in 1996. She was elected chairwoman of the Majlis Committee on Women, Family and Youth in August 1997.

While in the Majlis, Vahid-Dastjerdi supported legal changes making it harder for women to obtain a divorce, keep custody of their children after divorce, or have an abortion. She is described by one critic as supporting the role of women as "pious mothers devoted to Islam, to their duties to their husbands, and to the Islamic Republic." She opposed a bill that might have led Iran to join the United Nations Convention on the Elimination of All Forms of Discrimination Against Women.

In April 1998, Vahid-Dastjerdi helped draft a proposal for sexual segregation in hospitals and medical institutions to comply with Sharia. This plan envisaged female hospitals for women staffed exclusively by women, on a model sharing some features of London's Elizabeth Garrett Anderson Hospital, which led to the founding of the London School of Medicine for Women. The plan was eventually rejected on grounds of cost, after heavy criticism from doctors and health professionals. A similar plan to separate Iranian hospitals by gender, based on Vahid-Dastjerdi's original proposal, was enacted in 2006. The president of the Council of Iranian Medical Specialists described the plan as "not even realistic" because of the "shortage of female specialists in many cities".

In May 1999, she addressed a rally in Tehran to protest the ban on wearing the headscarf in the Turkish parliament. She condemned the ban as an affront to Muslims and a crime against human rights.

On 3 September 2009, the Majlis confirmed Vahid-Dastjerdi as Iran's Minister of Health and Medical Education. She received 175 favoring, 82 opposing, and 29 abstaining votes, and is the first female minister in the history of the Islamic Republican government. On the same day, two other female candidates for ministries (Sousan Keshavarz and Fatemeh Ajorlou) were voted down.

Vahid-Dastjerdi is considered politically conservative, but supports a role for women in society. She told parliamentarians "Women must have a greater role in the country's affairs." After her confirmation, she said "I think today women reached their long-standing dream of having a woman in the cabinet to pursue their demands. This is an important step for women and I hold my head high." On 27 December 2012, she was removed from her position as health minister. Mahmoud Ahmadinejad appointed her deputy, Mohammad-Hassan Tarighat Monfared, as caretaker of the ministry until a new minister is approved by the parliament.

== Publications ==
She has written and translated many books in the field of women's health. The following is probably not a complete list.

- Jannani S, Vahid-Dastjerdi M. "Relationship of placenta accreta to previous cesarean section". 5th Seminar of Fertility and Infertility, Tehran, February 1991.
- Vahid-Dastjerdi M, Moalleman M. Cesarean section indications in Arash hospital, 1994 [PhD thesis]. Tehran, Tehran University of Medical Sciences, Department of Gynecology and Obstetrics, 1995.
- Ramazanali F., Vahid Dastjerdi M., Beigi A., Moini A. "The Relationship Between Maternal HCT Levels, Birth Weight And Risk of Low Birth Weight", Iranian Journal of Pediatrics, Winter 2006; 16(4):447–454.
- Vahid Dastjerdi M., Alavi Tabari N., Asgari Z., Beygi A. "The relationship of endometrial thickness detected by transvaginal sonography with the results of endometrial biopsy & hysteroscopic directed biopsy in post menopausal bleeding", Tehran University Medical Journal; Vol. 65, No. 11, Feb 2008
- Moeini Ashraf, Shafieizadeh N., Vahid Dastjerdi M., Majidi Sh., Eslami B. "The Effect of Age on Ovarian Reserve Markers in Tehranian Women With Normal Fertility", International Journal of Endocrinology and Metabolism (IJEM), June 2008; 6(2):114–119.

Political offices
Preceded by Kamran Bagheri Lankarani	Minister of Health; 2009–2013	Succeeded by Hassan Hashemi
Civic offices
Preceded by Rozita Shamsaee	Head of Arash Hospital; 2004–2009	Succeeded by Nasim Vahidi
