= Seifollah Vahid Dastjerdi =

Head of the Iranian Red Crescent Society (1926–1999)

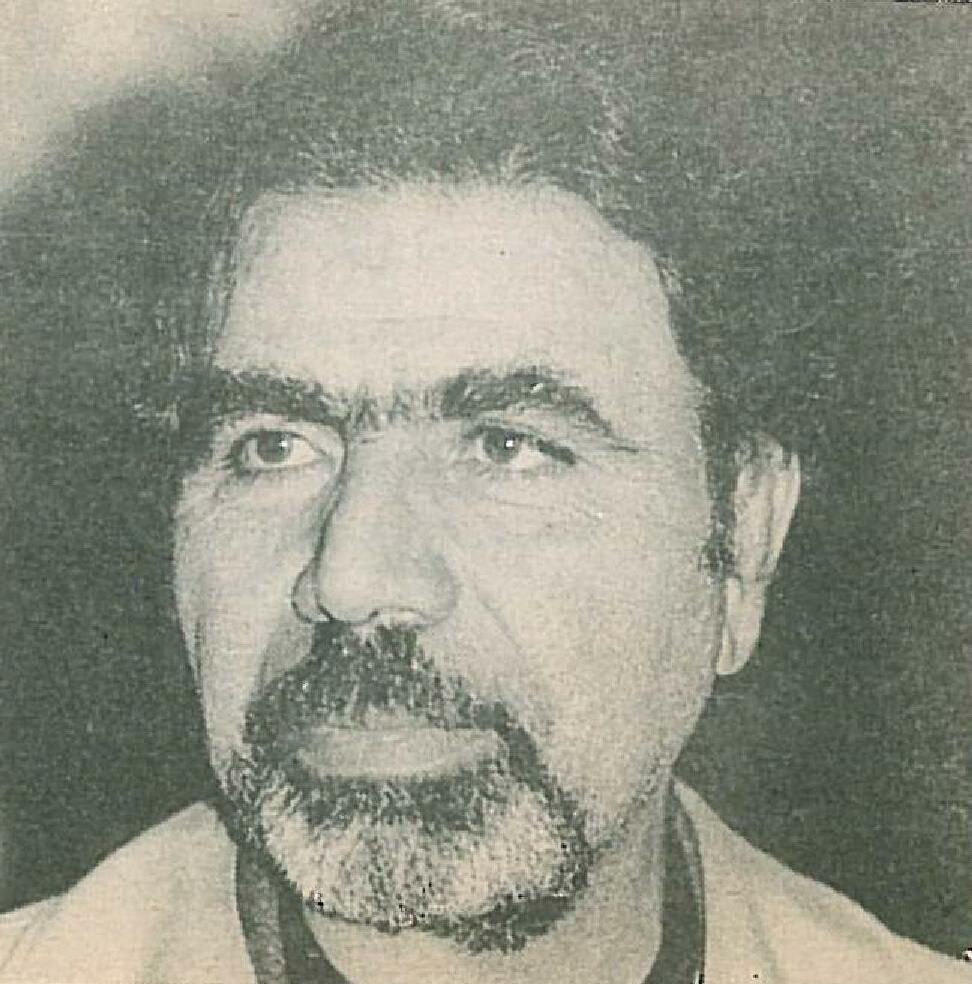
Dastjerdi in 1980

Seifollah Vahid Dastjerdi (Persian: سیف‌الله وحید دستجردی; 1926–1999) was head of the Iranian Red Crescent Society.

During political turmoil in Tehran following the 1987 Mecca incident in Saudi Arabia, Seifollah Vahid Dastjerdi appeared on television speaking for Iran Red Crescent. In an interview seen on NBC Evening News for 18 August 1987, he claimed women victims of the violence had been deliberately killed.

In 1997, he was closely involved with the Red Crescent's relief activities following the Ardabil earthquake.

He was the father of Marzieh Vahid-Dastjerdi.

Non-profit organization positions
Preceded by Hassan Firouzabadi	President of the Iranian Red Crescent Society; 1983–1999	Succeeded by Ahmad-Ali Nourbala
