= Mohammad Jahromi =

Former government official in Iran

Seyyed Mohammad Jahromi
- محمد جهرمی
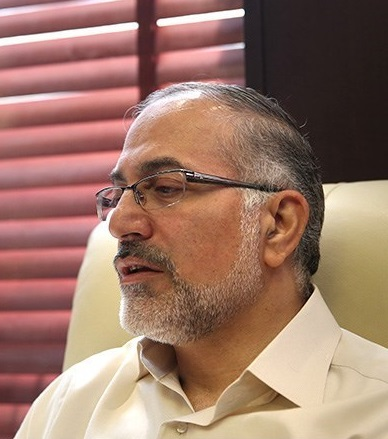

Minister of Labor and Social Affairs
- In office 24 August 2005 – 3 September 2009
- President: Mahmoud Ahmedinejad
- Preceded by: Nasser Khaleghi
- Succeeded by: Reza Sheykholeslam

Governor of Fars province
- In office 1993–1997
- Preceded by: Ali Danesh Monfared
- Succeeded by: Gholamreza Sahraeian

Personal details
- Born: 1958 (age 67–68) Tehran, Iran

Military service
- Branch/service: Revolutionary Guards
- Years of service: 1979–1982

Mohammad Jahromi (born 1958) is a former Iranian governor and politician who served as minister of labor and social affairs from 2005 to 2009.

== Early life and education ==
Jahromi was born in Tehran in 1958. He holds a bachelor's degree and a master's degree in public administration which he obtained in 1993 and 1997, respectively. He also received a PhD in strategic management in 2005.

== Career ==
Jahromi was the deputy chairman for executive affairs of the Guardian Council. He was also one of the founding members of the IRGC in the provinces of Gilan and Mazandaran in 1979. He acted as an IRGC commander in Noor. In addition, he served as the governor of different provinces, including Zanjan (1982–1984), Lorestan (1984–1989) and Semnan (1984–1999). He was among the members of secretariat of the State Expediency Council.

On 24 August 2005, he became the minister of labor and social affairs in the first cabinet of Mahmoud Ahmedinejad. He was approved by the Majlis with 197 votes in favor. He was succeeded by Reza Sheykholeslam in August 2009 as minister of labor and social affairs.

Immediately after his removal from office, Jahromi was appointed deputy of the judiciary chief, Sadeq Larijani, in August 2009. Next Jahromi was named chief of the state-run Bank Saderat. He was removed from office following his involvement in a financial scandal.

=== Sanctions ===
Jahromi was sanctioned by the European Union on 1 December 2011 due to his presidency at the Saderat Bank, which was also sanctioned by the Union. He was omitted from the sanction list in October 2012.

== Personal life ==
Jahromi is the son-in-law of Ali Akbar Nategh Noori.
