= Mahmoud Farshidi =

Iranian politician (1951–2025)

Minister of Education of Iran
- In office 9 November 2005 – 1 December 2007
- President: Mahmoud Ahmadinejad
- Preceded by: Morteza Haji
- Succeeded by: Alireza Ali-Ahmadi

Personal details
- Born: 29 May 1951 Iran
- Died: 12 March 2025 (aged 73) Iran
- Citizenship: Iran
- Children: 4
- Occupation: Politician

Mahmoud Farshidi (Persian: محمود فرشیدی; 29 May 1951 – 12 March 2025) was an Iranian politician and the Minister of Education of Iran from 2005 to 2007.

== Life and career ==
Mahmoud Farshidi was an Iranian politician who served as the Minister of Education under President Mahmoud Ahmadinejad from who was nominated for the post on 2 November 2005.

There was some controversy over the appointment due to his lack of experience. He was approved by the Iranian legislature on 9 November by 136 votes to 91.

His tenure was marked by controversies, including allegations of inappropriate exam questions and the suppression of teachers' protests.

Farshidi was dismissed in December 2007 and replaced by Alireza Ali-Ahmadi, who had close ties to President Ahmadinejad.

He was a writer for the conservative Resalat newspaper.

Farshidi died in Iran on 12 March 2025, at the age of 73.

== Controversies and Resignation ==
During his time in office, Farshidi was widely criticized for:

- Exam Scandal: National exam questions contained statements perceived as offensive to Islamic teachings.
- Teachers' Protests: His administration was accused of violently suppressing union demonstrations demanding better wages and working conditions.

Due to mounting pressure, he was dismissed in December 2007.

Political offices
Preceded by Morteza Haji	Minister of Education; 9 November 2005 – 1 December 2007	Succeeded by Alireza Ali Ahmadi
