= Mohammad Ardakani =

Iranian politician

- محمد اردکانی
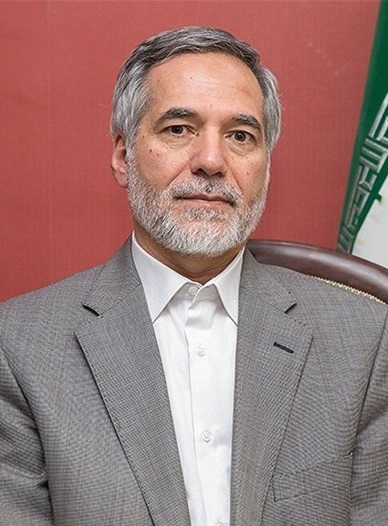

President of the National Organization for Civil Registration
- In office 9 October 2009 – 15 May 2016
- President: Mahmoud Ahmedinejad; Hassan Rouhani
- Preceded by: Mohammad Reza Ayatollahi
- Succeeded by: Alireza Avayi

Governor of Qom
- In office 19 March 2008 – 8 October 2009
- President: Mahmoud Ahmedinejad
- Preceded by: Abbas Mohtaj
- Succeeded by: Mohammad Hossein Mousapour

Minister of Cooperatives
- In office 9 November 2005 – 28 October 2006; Acting: 27 August – 9 November 2005
- President: Mahmoud Ahmedinejad
- Preceded by: Ali Soufi
- Succeeded by: Mohammad Abbasi

Personal details
- Born: 1955 (age 70–71) Ardakan, Iran
- Spouse: Efat Nabavi
- Children: 3
- Website: https://www.nazemiardakani.ir

Mohammad Nazemi Ardakani is an Iranian politician who served as the minister of cooperatives and governor of the Qom province.

== Career ==
Ardakani served as the representative of the religious judge in the Iranian Army's revolutionary courts in western Iran. Then he became a member of the IRGC's political bureau in Kurdistan province. He served as a member of the supreme labor council from 1990 to 1994.

When then newly-elect President Mahmoud Ahmedinejad's nominee for the minister of cooperatives was not approved by the Majlis, Ardakani was named acting minister in September 2005. He was nominated by Ahmedinejad for the full portfolio in early November 2005. Ardakani was approved by the Majlis as minister on 9 November, getting 174 votes out of 236, with 51 against. He was removed from office and was succeeded by Mohammad Abbasi in the post on 5 November 2006.

After leaving office Ardakani became the head of the Institute of Standards and Industrial Research of Iran (ISIRI). Then he was appointed governor of Qom province. Next he was made deputy to Mohammad Najjar, minister of interior. Ardakani was also named head of National Organization of Civil Registration.

== Personal life ==
Ardakani is married to the aunt of Masoud Zaribafan, who was cabinet secretary and is Ahmedinejad's brother-in-law.
