= Hassan Tarighat Monfared =

Iranian politician (1946–2021)

- حسن طریفت‌منفرد
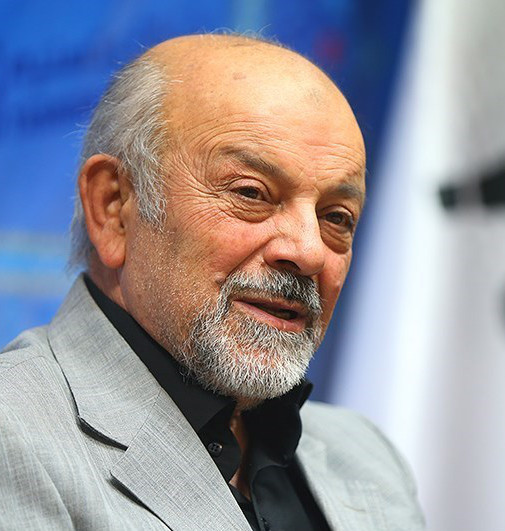

Minister of Health and Medical Education
- In office 17 March 2013 – 15 August 2013; Acting: 27 December 2012 – 17 March 2013
- President: Mahmoud Ahmadinejad
- Preceded by: Marzieh Vahid Dastjerdi
- Succeeded by: Hassan Ghazizadeh Hashemi

Personal details
- Born: May 28, 1946 Tehran, Iran
- Died: 30 September 2021 (aged 74–75)
- Party: Society of Devotees of the Islamic Revolution

Mohammad-Hassan Tarighat Monfared (Persian: محمدحسن طریفت‌منفرد,1946 – 30 September 2021) was an Iranian physician and principlist politician who served as the Minister of Health and Medical Education under President Mahmoud Ahmadinejad from March to August 2013.

He died at the age of 75 after suffering a fall.

== Electoral history ==
Year	Election	Votes	%	Rank	Notes
2016	Parliament	11,685	0.33%	90th	Lost
