= Ruin Tan Arash Hospital, Tehran =

Geography
- Location: Tehranpars, Tehran, Iran
- Coordinates: 35.73732°N 51.53511°E

Organisation
- Care system: Public
- Type: Specialist
- Affiliated university: Tehran University of Medical Sciences

Services
- Beds: 128
- Speciality: Women's Health

History
- Former name: Aresh Polyclinic
- Opened: 1971

Links
- Website: medicine.tums.ac.ir
- Lists: Hospitals in Iran

Ruyin-Tan Arash Hospital or Ruin-Tan Arash Hospital (Persian: بیمارستان آرش رویین‌تن) is a General Women's Hospital located in Tehranpars, an eastern suburb of Tehran in Iran.

The hospital was founded in 1971 as Aresh Polyclinic at 126 Rashid Avenue, Tehran Pars, by Arbab Hormoz Aresh for his son (Rohinton Aresh), and bequeathed by him to the Red Crescent. The Ministry of Health took it over at the start of the Islamic Revolution, in 1978. In 1985, Tehran University of Medical Sciences (TUMS) took it over as an educational, research and treatment center for gynecology and obstetrics, with 128 active beds.

As it was the only public hospital in an area of growing population, physical space became a limitation. The Foundation of the Deprived and War Veterans agreed with TUMS in 1991 on an extension. The new building and facilities with 120 beds opened in 2003 at Eastern 196th Street, 3rd Square, Tehran Pars. The hospital also now has a research center and educational office to support research projects.

The Chairman of the hospital is Dr. Ashraf Moiini, MD, Gynecology, Obstetric and Infertility specialist. Its Director is Mohammad Reza Shahbazi Moghaddam, Msc.
