= Sadeq Khalilian =

Iranian economist and politician

- صادق خلیلیان
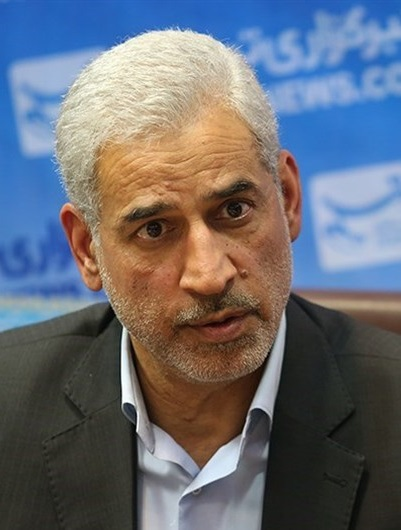
- Khalilian in 2018

Governor General of Khuzestan
- In office 5 September 2021 – 28 December 2022
- President: Ebrahim Raisi
- Preceded by: Qasem Soleimani Dashtaki
- Succeeded by: Ali-Akbar Hosseini Mehrab

Minister of Agriculture
- In office 3 September 2009 – 15 August 2013
- President: Mahmoud Ahmedinejad
- Preceded by: Mohammad Reza Eskandari
- Succeeded by: Mahmoud Hojjati

Personal details
- Born: 8 August 1959 (age 67) Ahvaz, Pahlavi Iran
- Education: Tarbiat Modares University

Military service
- Branch/service: Revolutionary Committee; Revolutionary Guards

Sadeq Khalilian (Persian: صادق خلیلیان; born 8 August 1959) is an Iranian conservative politician who served as the governor of Khuzestan province from 2021 to 2022. He is the former agriculture minister from 2009 to 2013 in the government headed by Mahmoud Ahmedinejad.

== Early life and education ==
Khalilian was born in Ahvaz in the Khuzestan province in 1959. He holds a bachelor's degree from Ahvaz University. He received a PhD in agricultural economy from Tarbiat Modares University in 1996. During his studies, he was a member of the Islamic Association of Students.

== Career ==
Khalilian became a member of the Revolutionary Committees and IRGC after graduation. In 1990, he began to work at Tarbiat Modares University's faculty of agriculture as a faculty member. From 1998 to 2000, he served at different administrative positions at the university. Then he served as deputy agriculture minister until 2009. After the presidential elections in 2009, Ahmedinejad nominated Khalilian as agriculture minister. He was approved by the Majlis on 3 September 2009. He won 200 votes in favor and 54 votes against.

Khalilian registered for the 2013 presidential election, but he withdrew his candidacy on 14 May.
