= Mehdi Ghazanfari =

Iranian politician and government official (born 1960)

- مهدی غضنفری
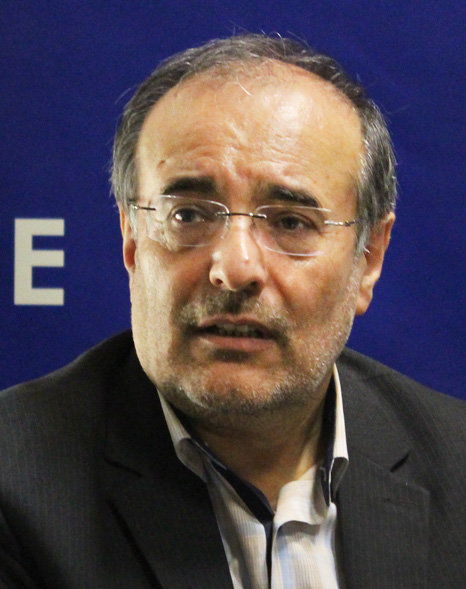
- Ghazanfari in 2019

Chairman of the National Development Fund of Iran
- In office 13 October 2021 – 25 August 2026
- President: Ebrahim Raisi Masoud Pezeshkian
- Preceded by: Morteza Shahidzadeh
- Succeeded by: Khodadad Gharibpour

Minister of Industry, Mines and Business
- In office 3 August 2011 – 15 August 2013
- President: Mahmoud Ahmadinejad
- Preceded by: Himself (Commerce); Ali Akbar Mehrabian (Industries and Mines)
- Succeeded by: Mohammadreza Nematzadeh

Minister of Commerce
- In office 3 September 2009 – 3 August 2011
- President: Mahmoud Ahmadinejad
- Preceded by: Masoud Mir Kazemi
- Succeeded by: Himself (Industries and Business)

Personal details
- Born: November 16, 1960 (age 65) Lorestan, Iran
- Awards: Order of Service (2nd class)

Mehdi Ghazanfari Khansari (Persian: مهدی غضنفری خوانساری, born 16 November 1960) is an Iranian politician and the former chairman of the National Development Fund of Iran from 2021 to 2026. He was Minister of Industries and Business from 3 August 2011 to 15 August 2013 and Minister of Commerce in the second cabinet of Mahmoud Ahmadinejad from 9 August 2009 to 3 August 2011.

Political offices
Preceded by Masoud Mir Kazemi	Minister of Commerce; 2009–2011	Succeeded by Himself as Minister of Industries and Business
Preceded by Himself as Minister of Commerce	Minister of Industries and Business; 2011–2013	Succeeded by Mohammadreza Nematzadeh
Preceded by Ali Akbar Mehrabian as Minister of Industries and Mines	Minister of Industries and Business; 2011–2013	Succeeded by Mohammadreza Nematzadeh
