= Kamran Bagheri Lankarani =

Iranian physician and politician

- کامران باقری لنکرانی
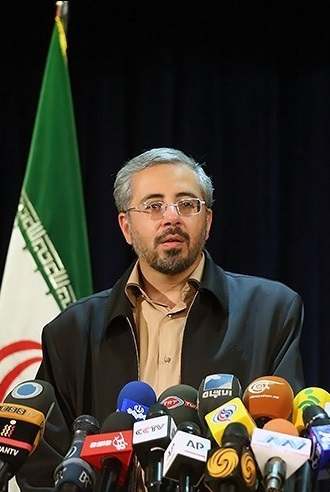

Minister of Health and Medical Education
- In office 24 August 2005 – 3 September 2009
- President: Mahmoud Ahmadinejad
- Preceded by: Masoud Pezeshkian
- Succeeded by: Marzieh Vahid-Dastjerdi

Personal details
- Born: 1965 (age 60–61) Tehran, Iran
- Party: Front of Islamic Revolution Stability
- Children: 3 sons
- Education: Shiraz University of Medical Sciences

Kamran Bagheri Lankarani (Persian: کامران باقری لنکرانی; born 1965) is an Iranian physician and politician who was Minister of Health and Medical Education from 2005 until 2009.

Born in 1965, he finished medical school at Shiraz University of Medical Sciences, and attained an advanced fellowship degree in medicine from the same university. He specializes in gastroenterology.

Baqeri-Lankarani got his doctorate from Shiraz University of Medical Sciences in 1989. He received post-doctorate certificate in 1992 from the same university. He served as a head of Shiraz Namazi Hospital (1993–94), deputy chancellor of Shiraz Medical Sciences University (1994–1996) and manager of the university's internal medicine department (since 1996). He then served as a member of the presiding board of Shiraz Medical System Administration (1996–2000), secretary of Islamic Association of Fars province physicians and a member of the Islamic Society of Shiraz University Students.

== Academic contributions ==
As of 19 April 2025, Bagheri Lankarani's Google Scholar profile lists 821 publications on a variety of medicine-related topics. One article by Bagheri Lankarani and co-authors, published in Environmental Science and Pollution Research in 2021, was retracted in 2024, due to "a number of concerns, including but not limited to compromised peer review process, inappropriate or irrelevant references, containing nonstandard phrases or not being in scope of the journal."

Party political offices
New title Party established	Spokesperson of the Front of Islamic Revolution Stability; 2011–2013	Succeeded by Amir-Hossein Ghazizadeh Hashemi
