= Alireza Tahmasbi =

Iranian politician (born 1961)

Alireza Tahmasebi (Persian: علیرضا طهماسبی, born 1961) is Iran's former minister of industry and mines. He resigned on 10 August 2007.

He holds a Ph.D. in mechanical engineering from Université Laval. His master's degree was from Shiraz University.
