= Ebrahim Azizi =

Iranian politician

- ابراهیم عزیزی
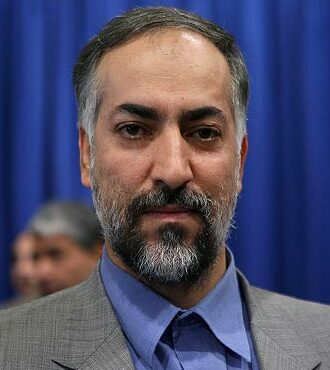

Member of the Parliament of Iran
- Incumbent
- Assumed office 27 May 2024
- Constituency: Tehran, Rey, Shemiranat, Eslamshahr and Pardis
- In office 27 September 2020 – 26 May 2024
- Constituency: Kermanshah
- Majority: 21,966 (47.31%)
- In office 27 May 1996 – 26 May 2000
- Constituency: Kermanshah
- Majority: 79,514 (38.19%)

Personal details
- Born: c. 1963 (age 62–63) Kermanshah, Iran
- Party: Coalition Council of Islamic Revolution Forces

Ebrahim Azizi (Persian: ابراهیم عزیزی; Born 1963 - Kermanshah) is an Iranian politician, who currently serves as a member of the Iranian Parliament representing Tehran, Rey, Shemiranat and Eslamshahr since 2024.

== Career ==
Azizi was a member and spokesman of the Guardian Council. He also served as a representative of Kermanshah in the Iranian parliament.

IranWire reported in May 2026 that Azizi had described a draft plan targeting Donald Trump, Benjamin Netanyahu and the CENTCOM commander over their alleged role in the assassination of Ali Khamenei, including a proposed €50 million reward for killing Trump.
