= Mohammad-Reza Eskandari =

Iranian politician

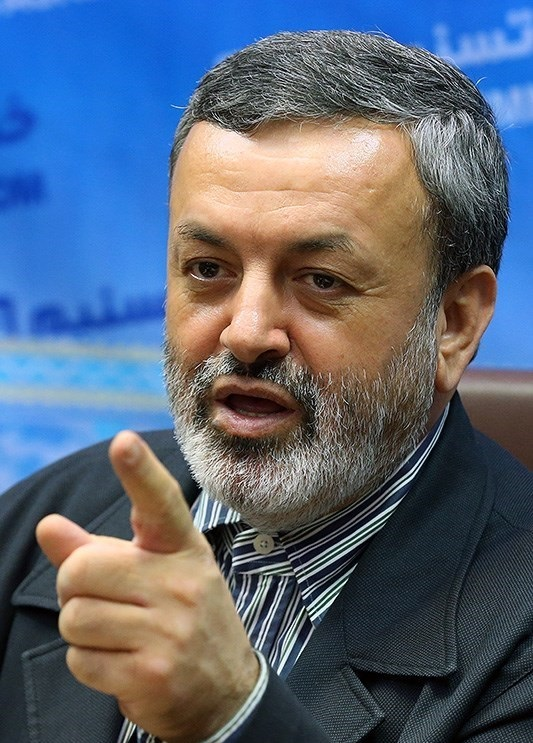

Minister of Agriculture
- In office 24 August 2005 – 3 September 2009
- President: Mahmoud Ahmedinejad
- Preceded by: Mahmoud Hojjati
- Succeeded by: Sadeq Khalilian

Personal details
- Born: c. 1960 (age 65–66) Ahvaz, Iran
- Party: Nonpartisan
- Education: Shahid Chamran University of Ahvaz

Military service
- Allegiance: Islamic Revolutionary Guards

Mohammad Reza Eskandari (Persian: محمدرضا اسکندری) was the Minister of Agriculture of the Islamic Republic of Iran from 2005 to 2009.
