= Alireza Ali-Ahmadi =

Iranian politician

Alireza Ali Ahmadi
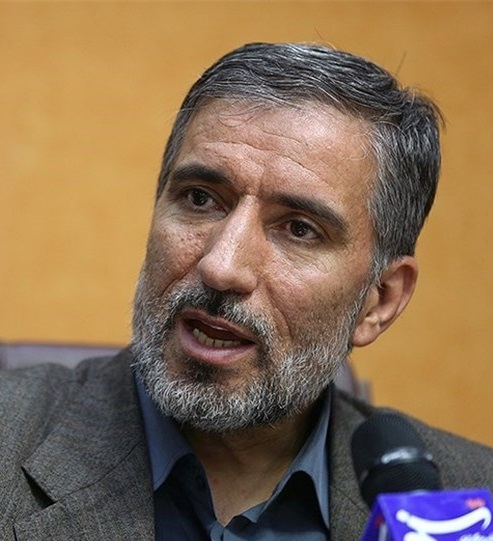

Minister of Education
- In office 19 February 2008 – 3 September 2009; Acting: 1 December 2007 – 19 February 2008
- President: Mahmoud Ahmadinejad
- Preceded by: Mahmoud Farshidi
- Succeeded by: Hamid-Reza Haji Babaee

Personal details
- Born: 11 May 1959 (age 67) Isfahan, Iran
- Party: Society of Devotees of the Islamic Revolution; YEKTA Front
- Education: Tarbiat Modares University; Science and Technology University

Alireza Ali Ahmadi (born 11 May 1959 in Isfahan) is an Iranian politician and the current CEO of the National Iranian Tanker Company. He is the former Minister of Education from 2008 to 2009. Before his appointment as Minister of Education, he was chancellor of Payame Noor University. He was also proposed Minister of Commerce in Mahmoud Ahmadinejad's first cabinet which he was not confirmed by the Iranian Parliament. He was one of the candidates in 2013 presidential election but was withdrawn on 21 May.
