= Masoud Mir Kazemi =

Iranian politician

Seyyed Masoud Mir Kazemi
- مسعود میرکاظمی
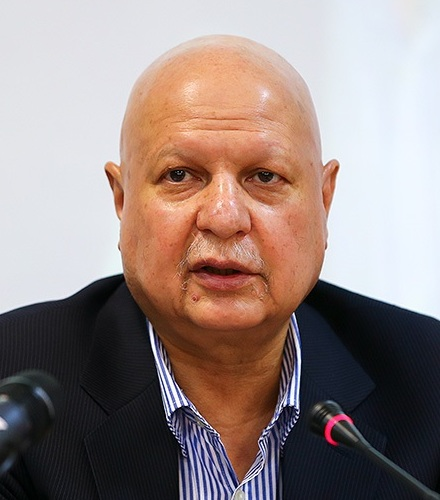
- Kazemi in 2021

Vice president of Iran Head of Plan and Budget Organization
- In office 11 August 2021 – 16 April 2023
- President: Ebrahim Raisi
- Preceded by: Mohammad Bagher Nobakht
- Succeeded by: Davoud Manzour

Minister of Petroleum
- In office 3 September 2009 – 16 May 2011
- President: Mahmoud Ahmadinejad
- Preceded by: Gholam-Hossein Nozari
- Succeeded by: Mahmoud Ahmadinejad (Acting)

Minister of Commerce
- In office 24 August 2005 – 3 September 2009
- President: Mahmoud Ahmadinejad
- Preceded by: Mohammad Shariatmadari
- Succeeded by: Mehdi Ghazanfari

Member of the Parliament of Iran
- In office 27 May 2012 – 26 May 2016
- Constituency: Tehran, Rey, Shemiranat and Eslamshahr
- Majority: 585,228 (25.2%)

Personal details
- Born: 1960 (age 65–66) Tehran, Iran
- Party: Stability Front
- Education: Iran University of Science and Technology; Tarbiat Modarres University

Military service
- Branch/service: Revolutionary Committee; Revolutionary Guards
- Years of service: 1979–2005

Masoud Mir Kazemi (Persian: مسعود میرکاظمی; born 1960) is an Iranian principlist politician and the former Vice President of Iran and head of Plan and Budget Organization. He was a member of the Parliament of Iran from Tehran district from 2012 until 2016, and also previously served at two ministerial posts in the cabinet of Mahmoud Ahmadinejad.

== Early life and education ==
Kazemi was born in Tehran in 1960. He received a bachelor's degree and a master's degree from Iran University of Science and Technology in 1986 and 1989, respectively. He also holds PhD in industrial engineering from Tarbiat Modarres University (1996).

== Career ==
After the 1979 revolution, Kazemi became a member of the revolution committees and then of the IRGC. Then he headed Shahed University. He was Iran's minister of commerce during the first term of president Mahmoud Ahmadinejad from 2005 to 2009. Kazemi discussed the possibility of making neighbouring Iraq a major gas export market, citing the destruction of Iraq's energy infrastructure as a result of the 2003 invasion of Iraq.

He served as minister of petroleum from 2009 to 2011, replacing Gholam Hossein Nozari after Ahmadinejad was re-elected.

On 14 October 2010, Mir Kazemi was elected as conference president for 2011 OPEC.

On 9 May 2011, it was announced that Mir Kazemi, Sadegh Mahsouli and Ali Akbar Mehrabian would leave the cabinet. He was not participating in cabinet meetings from June 2011 and Mohammad Aliabadi was acting minister in his absence. He announced his candidacy for Parliament of Iran in the 2012 legislative election on 22 December 2011 and was elected as an MP from Tehran.

Political offices
Preceded by Mohammad Shariatmadari	Minister of Commerce; 2005–2009	Succeeded by Mehdi Ghazanfari
Preceded by Gholam Hossein Nozari	Minister of Petroleum; 2009–2011	Succeeded by Rostam Ghasemi
Preceded by Mohammad Bagher Nobakht	Head of Plan and Budget Organization; 2021–2023	Succeeded by Davoud Manzour
Assembly seats
Preceded by Hamid Reza Katouzian	President of Iranian Parliament Commission on Energy; 2012–2014	Succeeded by Ali Marvi
