= Asadollah Abbasi =

Iranian politician

- اسدالله عباسی
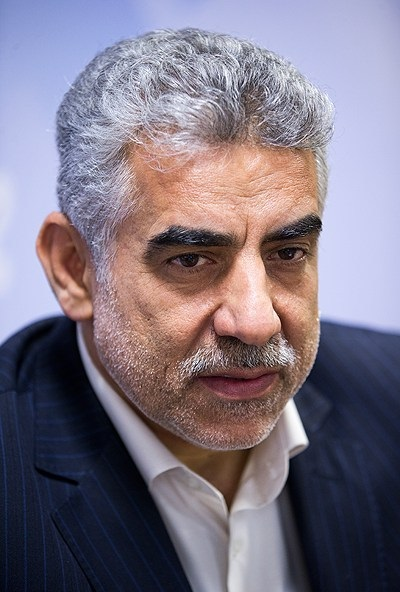

Governor-general of Gilan
- In office 20 October 2021 – 2 October 2024
- President: Ebrahim Raisi
- Preceded by: Arsalan Zare
- Succeeded by: Hadi Haghshenas

Minister of Cooperatives, Labour and Social Welfare
- In office 5 May 2013 – 15 August 2013; Acting: 4 February 2013 – 5 May 2013
- President: Mahmoud Ahmadinejad
- Preceded by: Abdolreza Sheykholeslami
- Succeeded by: Ali Rabii

Member of the Parliament of Iran
- In office 28 May 2016 – 26 May 2020
- Preceded by: Mohammad-Mahdi Rahbari
- Succeeded by: Mohammad Safari
- Constituency: Rudsar and Amlash
- Majority: 40,345 (37.07%)
- In office 27 May 2004 – 26 May 2012
- Preceded by: Davoud Hassanzadegan
- Succeeded by: Mohammad-Mahdi Rahbari
- Constituency: Rudsar and Amlash
- Majority: 34,259 (32.58%) (8th term); 28,373 (35.69%) (7th term)

Personal details
- Born: c. 1961 (age 64–65) Halu Kaleh, Rudsar County, Iran
- Party: YEKTA Front
- Education: SRBIAU
- Website: Official website

Asadollah Abbasi (born 1961) is an Iranian conservative politician who formerly served as the Governor general of Gilan province from 2021 to 2024.

== Early life and education ==
Abbasi was born in 1961. He holds a degree in education. He received a PhD degree from Islamic Azad University.

== Career ==
Abbasi is a member of the Majlis or Parliament, being a representative of Rudsar. He served as a member of Parliament's education and research committee. Then he became the deputy head of the committee. Abbasi was named as deputy to then labor minister Abdolreza Sheykholeslami. On 3 February 2013, Sheykholeslam was sacked by the president Mahmoud Ahmadinejad and Abbasi was appointed acting labor minister.

On 24 April, Ahmedinejad proposed him as the minister of labor. Abbasi was approved as the minister by the Majlis on 5 May. Abbasi's term ended on 15 August 2013 and he was replaced by Ali Rabii in the post.
