= Sousan Keshavarz =

Iranian politician (born 1965)

Sousan Keshavarz (Persian: سوسن کشاورز; born 1965) was the 2009 nominee of Iran's President Mahmoud Ahmadinejad as Minister of Education. She was voted down by the Majlis of Iran on September 3, 2009, with 49 favoring, 209 opposing, and 28 abstaining votes.

== Career ==
Keshavarz was previously a deputy in the Education Ministry for one year.

== Nomination ==
She has been criticized for her lack of experience. Asadollah Abbasi, a member of the Parliamentary Education Committee, said beforehand that Mr. Ahmedinejad's nomination of Keshavarz would make it "clear that he knows nothing about education." However, MP Alaeddin Boroujerdi supported her, saying that women constitute 50 percent of the country's population and 60 percent of the students in universities are female. He added that naming them in the new cabinet is a reformation.

Following her nomination for the education ministry, Keshavarz's presentation of her policy agenda in late August 2009 made her the first woman ministerial nominee to address the Iranian parliament since the 1970s.
