= Mohammad Abbasi =

Iranian politician (born 1958)

- محمد عباسی
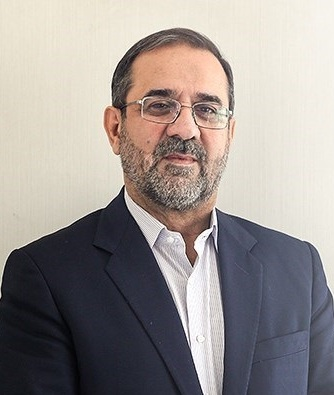
- Abbasi in 2021

Minister of Sport and Youth
- In office 3 August 2011 – 17 August 2013
- President: Mahmoud Ahmadinejad
- Preceded by: Ali Saeedlou (as Head of Physical Organization); Homayoun Hamidi (as Acting Head of Youth National Organization)
- Succeeded by: Mahmoud Goudarzi

Minister of Cooperatives
- In office 5 November 2006 – 3 August 2011
- President: Mahmoud Ahmadinejad
- Preceded by: Mohammad Ardakani
- Succeeded by: Reza Sheykholeslam (Cooperatives, Labour and Welfare)

Member of Parliament of Iran
- In office 28 May 2004 – 1 November 2005
- Constituency: Gorgan
- Majority: 143,655 (36.08%)

Personal details
- Born: 28 February 1958 (age 68) Gorgan, Iran

Mohammad Abbasi (Persian: محمد عباسی, born 28 February 1958) is an Iranian politician who is the former minister of youth affairs and sports. He was Minister of Cooperatives in the first and second Cabinet of Mahmoud Ahmadinejad from 2005 to 2011.

== Early life ==
He was born on 28 November 1958 in Gorgan, Golestan province. He was president of Azad University of Ghaemshahr from 1996 to 2004.

== Career ==
Abbasi was elected member of the Parliament of Iran from Gorgan constituency and was deputy head of budget center in the Parliament. After the resignation of Mohammad Ardakani as minister of cooperatives, President Mahmoud Ahmadinejad nominated Abbasi for the position to Parliament. He received 200 out of 285 votes and became minister 5 November 2006. He was re-appointed to the post in Second Cabinet of Ahmadinejad. On 20 June 2011, and after Ahmadinejad's candidate for ministry of youth affairs and sports was rejected by Parliament, he was appointed as acting minister. He was nominated for the full portfolio on 26 July 2011 and was confirmed by the Parliament on 3 August 2011.

Political offices
Preceded by Mohammad Ardakani	Minister of Cooperatives; 2005–2011	Succeeded by Reza Sheykholeslam as Minister of Cooperatives, Labour and Welfare
Preceded by New title	Minister of Youth Affairs and Sports; 2011–2013	Succeeded by Reza Salehi Amiri; Acting
