= Ali Akbar Mehrabian =

Iranian politician (born 1969)

- علی‌اكبر محرابيان
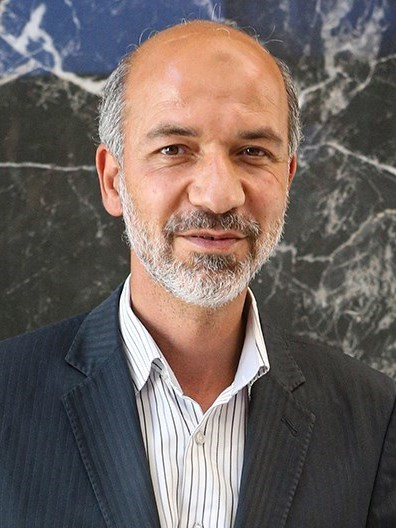
- Mehrabian in 2021

Minister of Energy
- In office 25 August 2021 – 21 August 2024
- President: Ebrahim Raisi; Mohammad Mokhber (acting)
- Preceded by: Reza Ardakanian
- Succeeded by: Abbas Aliabadi

Special Aide to the President
- In office 27 December 2011 – 3 August 2013
- President: Mahmoud Ahmadinejad
- Succeeded by: Hossein Fereydoun

Minister of Industries and Mines
- In office 2 November 2007 – 15 May 2011; Acting: 12 August – 2 November 2007
- President: Mahmoud Ahmadinejad
- Preceded by: Alireza Tahmasbi
- Succeeded by: Mehdi Ghazanfari (Industries and Business)

Personal details
- Born: 1969 (age 56–57) Khansar, Iran
- Awards: Order of Construction (2nd class)

Ali Akbar Mehrabian (Persian: علی‌اكبر محرابيان; born 1969) is an Iranian politician who was the former Minister of Energy from 2021 to 2024.

He was the minister of industries and mines from 2 November 2007 to 15 May 2011. In 2011, it was announced that Ministry of Industries and Mines would be merged with the Ministry of Commerce, and Mehrabian would leave the cabinet afterward.

== Early life and education ==
Mehrabian was born in 1969 in Isfahan, Iran. His family is from Isfahan. Mehrabi studied at Shiraz University and Tehran University. He obtained his master's degree in economic science from Tehran University .

== Ministerial activities ==
As a minister, Mehrabian traveled the world promoting Iran's commercial interests in friendly countries such as Qatar, Belarus, Egypt and Venezuela. He involved in the discussions of a potential World Oil Bank involving Russia and Venezuela, and agreed on a cooperation protocol with the Democratic Republic of the Congo. He also promoted Iran's bilateral links and financial support for Cuba.

He expressed deep concern over the non-adherence of industrial states to their commitments to control the emission of greenhouse gases.

He implemented policies to encourage the production of cars powered by compressed natural gas (CNG). Because Iran suffers from a lack of refining capacity, gasoline is rationed. Hundreds of thousands of gasoline-powered vehicles are also being converted to use a bi-fuel system allowing CNG as an alternative fuel. He encouraged developments under which cars with Iranian content would be built in Egypt and Syria.

Following deadly crashes of imported aircraft, he also hoped to develop domestic production of aircraft. He promoted the production of steel, copper, and coal. He implemented policies pressuring companies alleged to have links with businesses who trade with Israel, such as Coca-Cola, Nestle and Benetton.

Political offices
Preceded by Reza Ardakanian	Ministry of Energy; 2021–Present	Succeeded by Incumbent
Preceded by Alireza Tahmasbi	Ministry of Industries and Mines; 2007–2011	Succeeded by Mehdi Ghazanfari as Minister of Industries and Business
