= Abdolreza Sheykholeslami =

Associate Professor

Abdolreza Sheykhaleslami
- عبدالرضا شیخ‌الاسلامی
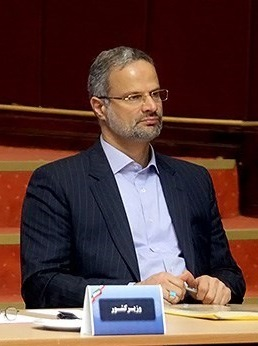
- Sheykhaleslami in 2013

Minister of Cooperatives, Labour and Social Welfare
- In office 3 August 2011 – 3 February 2013
- President: Mahmoud Ahmadinejad
- Preceded by: Himself (Labour); Mohammad Abbasi (Cooperatives); Sadeq Mahsouli (Social Welfare)
- Succeeded by: Asadollah Abbasi

Minister of Labour
- In office 3 September 2009 – 3 August 2011
- President: Mahmoud Ahmadinejad
- Preceded by: Mohammad Jahromi
- Succeeded by: Himself (Cooperatives, Labour and Welfare)

Head of President's Office
- In office 14 February 2007 – 25 July 2009
- President: Mahmoud Ahmadinejad
- Preceded by: Gholam-Hossein Elham
- Succeeded by: Esfandiar Rahim Mashaei

Personal details
- Born: Abdol-Reza Sheykhaleslami c. 1967 (age 58–59) Nowshahr, Iran
- Education: Iran University of Science and Technology

Abdolreza Sheykhaleslami (Persian: عبدالرضا شیخ‌الاسلامی) is an Iranian politician who is the former Minister of Cooperatives, Labour and Social Welfare. Before that, he was the Minister of Labour and Social Affairs in the second cabinet of Mahmoud Ahmadinejad from 2009 to 2011. He was dismissed from office on 3 February 2013, being the ninth minister to be fired during the second term of president Mahmoud Ahmedinejad since 2009.

== Early life and education ==
Sheykhaleslam was born on 1 January 1967 in Nowshahr, Mazandaran province. He was graduated from Iran University of Science and Technology in 1993, receiving a bachelor's degree in urban engineering. In 1995, he obtained a master's degree. He also holds a PhD in urban engineering, which he received from Iran University of Science and Technology in 2006.

== Career ==
Sheykhaleslam was a university teacher until 1997. He was appointed as deputy governor of Hormozgan province in 1997 after Ali Nazari became governor. In March 2001, Nazari was resigned from office and Sheykhaleslam was appointed by Mohammad Khatami as governor. He was in office until August 2005 after Mahmoud Ahmadinejad appointed him as the head of presidential center. On 6 August 2009, he was nominated as minister of labour and social affairs by Ahmadinejad and was confirmed by Parliament with an absolute majority. On 26 July 2011, he was nominated as minister of cooperatives, labour and social welfare after three ministries were merged and was confirmed by the Parliament on 3 August 2011. He was resigned on 3 February 2013 after parliament given a vote of no confidence to him. 192 of 272 parliament members voted in favour of the impeachment of Sheykhaleslam in the parliament. Asadollah Abbasi replaced him as acting minister.

Political offices
Preceded by Gholam-Hossein Elham	Chief of Staff of the President of Iran; 2007-2009	Succeeded by Esfandiar Rahim Mashaei
Preceded by Mohammad Jahromi	Minister of Labour and Social Affairs; 2009–2011	Succeeded by Himself as Minister of Cooperatives, Labour and Welfare
Preceded by Himself as Minister of Labour and Social Affairs	Minister of Cooperatives, Labour and Welfare; 2011–2013	Succeeded by Asadollah Abbasi
Preceded by Mohammad Abbasi as Minister of Cooperatives	Minister of Cooperatives, Labour and Welfare; 2011–2013	Succeeded by Asadollah Abbasi
Preceded by Sadeq Mahsouli as Minister of Welfare and Social Security	Minister of Cooperatives, Labour and Welfare; 2011–2013	Succeeded by Asadollah Abbasi
