= Ministry of Cooperatives (Iran) =

Former government ministry (1991–2011)

- وزارت تعاون

Agency overview
- Formed: 1991
- Dissolved: 2011
- Superseding agency: Ministry of Cooperatives, Labour and Social Welfare
- Jurisdiction: Islamic Republic of Iran
- Website: Official Website

The Ministry of Cooperatives (Persian: وزارت تعاون, Vâzart-e T'avân) established in 1991 was an Iranian government body responsible for the oversight of Cooperative business in Iran. The Ministry of Cooperatives was merged with the Ministry of Labour and Ministry of Social Welfare in 2011.

== Notable people ==
Former and first Minister of Ministry of Cooperatives, Labor and Social Welfare Reza Sheykoleslam was a governor of Hormozgan Province .

The last minister of Ministry of Cooperatives before its merger with Ministry of Labor and Ministry of Social Welfare Mohammad Abbasi is the most successful minister of sports with 4 gold, 5 silver and 3 bronze medals.

Former Vice Minister of Ministry of Cooperatives Bahman Salehi currently manages the renewable energy corporation SUNIR.

Former Minister of Ministry of Cooperatives, Labor and Social Welfare Asadollah Abbasi is a parliamentary representative for Rudsar.

== See also ==
- History of the cooperative movement
