= Azarakhsh Mokri =

Azarakhsh Mokri آذرخش مکری
- Born: 1968 (age 57–58); Tehran
- Education: Psychiatrist
- Alma mater: Tehran University of Medical Sciences
- Known for: treatment of addiction, Lectures on youtube
- Website: (Note: https://mokri.net/)

Azarakhsh Mokri (Persian: آذرخش مکری), born 1968 in Tehran, is an Iranian psychiatrist. He is an associate professor at Tehran University of Medical Sciences. He is also known for his studies of treatment of addiction and lectures for a wider audience on YouTube.

== Background ==
Born in Tehran, Mokri spent his earliest years in Arlington, Texas. Later he returned to Iran, where he completed high school and entered medical school. In 1997, he graduated from the Tehran University of Medical Sciences with a doctorate in psychiatry.

Mokri then joined the faculty of Tehran University of Medical Sciences, Roozbeh Hospital. Among his achievements is the opening of a specialized department for addiction treatment and the training of psychiatric assistants and psychiatric students.
