= Ebrahim Chehrazi =

Iranian psychiatrist

Ebrahim Chehrazi ابراهیم چهرازی
- Born: 7 October 1908; Isfahan, Qajar Iran
- Died: 20 March 2011 (aged 102); United States
- Education: Dar ul-Funun (Persia), University of Toulouse, Pitié-Salpêtrière Hospital
- Occupation: Psychiatrist
- Known for: The first psychiatrist in Iran, the founder of the first psychiatric hospital in Iran called Chehrazi Hospital 1939

Ebrahim Chehrazi (Persian: ابراهیم چهرازی; 7 October 1908 – 20 March 2011) was an Iranian psychiatrist. He is known as the first Iranian psychiatrist, and the founder of the first psychiatric hospital in Iran (1939), called Chehrazi.

== Background ==
Ebrahim Chehrazi was the son of an Iranian doctor. After primary school, he first entered Dar ul-Funun (Persia) and then the medical school in Tehran. At the end of his medical studies, he participated in the student expedition competition and after receiving the first ranking in both experimental and mathematical fields, he was sent to Europe in 1308 to study medicine.

He spent his first year at the University of Toulouse and then attended the Medical School of Paris. After graduating in 1313 with a degree in medicine, he spent two and a half years in the psychiatric ward of the Paris hospitals as Pitié-Salpêtrière Hospital, Saint Anne (French: Center hospitalier Sainte-Anne) and Paul Bruce (French: Hôpital Paul-Brousse). He wrote his dissertation on the subject "the self-image" and won a medal and a diploma from the University of Paris. After returning to Iran in 1936, he also received a degree in psychiatry and on 20 February 1937, he became an associate professor of neurology at a medical school, and after that, in the same year, he became director of the neurology department at "Razi Hospital". . He then spent two years in the Army's neurological department at the Army's Hospital No. 2 and was a forensic pathologist at the Ministry of Justice for one year. Chehrazi was a forensic pathologist at the time of Taghi Arani's death, but refused to confirm the false death certificate of Arani. Chehrazi wrote and published the first book on medical ethics in Iran, entitled Physician and Society, in 1938. Chehrazi was very interested in his hometown of Bagh-e Bahadoran, and for this reason, with his personal capital, he founded drinking water facilities, electric motors, telegraph offices, telephone booths, municipal buildings, office supplies and paid the total cost of the first year of Bagh-e Bahadoran municipality up to the revenue generation stage.

Chehrazi was one of the founders and secretary of the Association for Combating Opium and Alcohol and the representative of the University of Tehran School of Medicine in the commissions related to alcohol and opium. With the formation of the first popular organization called the "National Association for Combating Opium and Alcohol" in 1943, he accused the government of shortcomings in the fight against drugs and alcohol. In 1945, the four-story building of Aria Hospital on Keshavarz Boulevard, then 30 meters from the Karaj River, was established by Ebrahim Chehrazi. He also continued his work in the Ministry of Justice as an official expert on neurological diseases and in 1948 was elected technical inspector general of hospitals.

In 1950, after completing the first ward for mental disorders at Pahlavi Hospital (now: Imam Khomeini Hospital Complex) and then transferring the ward for mental disorders to Roozbeh Hospital in 1951, the field of neurology and psychiatry was established. Ebrahim Chehrazi became director of the first physiotherapy high school in the country in 1965. At the same time, he was also director of the neurology department at Pahlavi Hospital. Chehrazi retired in 1970 during Alinaghi Alikhani's tenure as president of the university after many years of scientific activity. At the end of 2010 at the age of one hundred and two in the United States he died. He was buried in the family tomb next to his father's tomb in the shrine of Prince Ibrahim in the Bahadur's garden.
