= Hamidreza Pouretemad =

Iranian neuropsychologist

Hamidreza Pouretemad (Persian: حمیدرضا پوراعتماد) is an Iranian neuropsychologist who is the founder and the Dean of the Institute for Cognitive and Brain Sciences at Shahid Beheshti University and Associate member of the Academy of Science of the Islamic Republic of Iran.

== Education ==
Pouretemad earned his B.A. in Clinical Psychology in 1987, and M.A. in Abnormal Child Psychology in 1991 from University of Tehran. He received his Ph.D. from the Department of Psychological Medicine, Institute of Psychiatry, London University in 1998.

== Career ==
In 2000, Pouretemad joined the Roozbeh Hospital, Tehran University of Medical Science and there after became a member of Department of Psychology at Shahid Beheshti University. He has been a pioneer in introducing autism to the Iranian community since 2001. He created guidelines for accessing habilitation services for individuals with Autism, which were established through legislation passed in 2002 by the State Welfare Organization. These achievements were based on the early results of a grant project awarded to him in 2001. During the study, more than 12000 hours of one-to-one intensive behavioural therapy, as well as children and parents assessments were conducted on 21 children with Pervasive Developmental Disorders. In order to evaluate the progress of the intervention program, the Coordinating Center for the Structured Behavioral Therapy of Autism was established in 2001. This was the first specialized center for autism in Iran to deliver therapeutic services, where instructor therapists were trained through an official autism course.

Pouretemad's clinical and research interests center on neurodevelopmental disorders and he is a frequent contributor to advanced research lines including application of new technologies for diagnosis and treatment of autism and dyslexia in collaboration with several universities in Iran. He has coauthored several books and is the author of many articles on autism and dyslexia, mainly devoted to Persian-speaking population.

Pouretemad has organized several national and international conferences/seminars, including; International Seminar on Developmental Disorders, 2004. He also presided the 4th &5th International Conference of Cognitive Sciences held in 2011 & 2013.

Pouretemad is the founder of several organizations dedicated to research, higher education and/or treatment services, including Center for the Treatment of Autistic Disorders (Tehran Autism, 2002), Tehran-Oxford Neurodevelopmental Center (co-founder, 2003), Behara Autism Center (2003), Institute for Cognitive and Brain Sciences (ICBS, 2012), Iranian Society for Cognitive Science and Technologies (2012) and Ava Autism Center (2014).

Pouretemad is the founder of the Journal of Neurodevelopmental Cognition. Publishing by ICBS & the Iranian Society for Cognitive Science and Technology (2017).

Pouretemad is the founder of the Center of Excellence in Cognitive Neuropsychology. Ministry of Science, Research & Technology, Iran (2019).

== Awards ==
- M.A. Scholarship, (1989–90), Tehran University, Iran.
- Ph. D. Scholarship, (1993-1998), Clinical Neurophysiology Lab., Department of Psychological Medicine, Institute of Psychiatry, London University, England.
- Honorary Clinical Psychologist (1996–97), The Maudsley Hospital, London, England.
- Visiting Colleague (July 2001), Department of Behavioral Neurology, Cambridge University, England.
- Scientific Visit (June–July 2003), Department of Physiology, Oxford University, England.
- Research Year Prize (2007), Shahid-Beheshti University, Iran.
