= Knowledge Utilization Research Center =

Medical research center in Iran

- Established: 2008
- Director: Prof. Reza Majdzadeh
- Staff: 14
- Address: N. 12, Nosrat St., 16th Azar St., Keshavarz Blvd. Tehran, Iran. Tel/Fax: +98-21-66419763, +98-21-66952530.
- Location: Tehran, Iran
- Website: KURC

The Knowledge Utilization Research Center (Persian: مركز تحقيقات بهره برداري از دانش سلامت) is one of the Tehran University of Medical Sciences' research centers which works in the area of knowledge translation (KT).

== Background ==
In 2006 the Knowledge Utilization Research Center began its work on Tehran University of Medical Sciences under the title of the 'KTE Study Group' in the 'Center of Academic and Health Policy'. In less than two years the center succeed in publishing more than 20 research paper in national and international journals. In these years the center also run several research projects in the field of knowledge translation. In 2008 it was approved as a research center by the Ministry of Health and Medical Education (Iran).

== Mission statement ==
The Knowledge Utilization Research Center aims to produce knowledge, localize it, and promote policies, methods and activities that lead to the better utilization of health knowledge in Iran. The goal of this center is to create change in health decision makers' behavior, i.e. to make decisions on the basis of scientific and research evidence on one hand, and to strengthen researchers' efforts in transferring research results on the other hand and improve their communicating environment.

To obtain these aims, center have some Strategies for its vision on 2014 based on People, Policy makers and managers, Health service providers, Researchers.

== Achievements ==
=== Education ===
- Workshops

The Knowledge Utilization Research center has designed and executed different workshops like Knowledge Transfer and Exchange, Adaptation of Clinical Guidelines, Systematic Review and Meta Analysis and Economic Evaluation which held in national and international level (sponsored by the Regional Office of the Eastern Mediterranean (EMRO)).

- Capacity Building

Researchers employed in the Knowledge Utilization Research center held educational classes at the center periodically once a week and discuss about the latest articles and project results at the world.

=== Research ===
- Self Assessment tool

The self-assessment tool for knowledge translation has been designed to assess the knowledge translation status in research organizations (Research centers, faculties and universities) by the center.

- Website

To strengthen and create an appropriate environment for promoting the culture of knowledge translation, the center website has been designed in three languages of Persian, English and Arabic that includes various sections such as online learning, bank of ideas, newsletter etc.

- KTE Newsletter

The Knowledge Translation newsletter is published monthly by the center to raise awareness in researchers and research users on knowledge translation.

== Publications ==
=== Books ===
- Knowledge Translation and Utilization of Research Results

Published in 2008 as a Persian book which is a review on knowledge translation models and theories and also an introduction to its methods.

- Research Studies in Zone 17 Presented as a Narrative Image

This booklet has been published to inform the community of the applied research studies conducted in Zone 17 of Tehran Municipality and has been presented as a narrative image and in lay language.

=== Articles ===
The results of KURC's research projects have been published in the form of papers in various national and international journals. These projects are designed in different areas of KT:

- Knowledge Translation, models, tools and methods.
- Knowledge Translation and researchers.
- Knowledge Translation and research organizations.
- Knowledge Translation and police makers.
- Knowledge Translation and media

== See also ==
- Tehran University of Medical Sciences
