= Hamid Golpira =

- Born: January 16, 1960; Baltimore, Maryland, US
- Died: July 7, 2015 (aged 55); Arad General Hospital, Tehran, Iran
- Occupation(s): Journalist writer
- Years active: 1980s–2015
- Notable credit(s): Press TV Commentator (2009–2015); Tehran Times Writer (1999–2015)

Hamid Golpira (Persian: حمید گل پیرا; January 16, 1960 – July 7, 2015) was an Iranian-American journalist, author and human rights activist. He was a senior editor for the Tehran Times from 2000 to 2015. Golpira was renowned in the Iranian English language community for his defense of Palestine, Islam and Islamic socialism. He was a frequent commentator on Press TV, Iran's English language 24-hour news station as well as writing for various written publications.

== Family and education ==
Golpira was born in Baltimore, Maryland in the US, but moved to East Germany in the 1980s to study Political Science, being present at the fall of the Berlin Wall. He was involved in political activism from his early twenties. In the late 1990s, Golpira moved to the Islamic Republic of Iran, the country of his parents before they relocated to the United States prior to the Iranian Revolution of 1979.

== Career ==
Golpira was one of Tehran Times' most prominent writers and editors. He had written on causes such as the Iraq Invasion, Syria and the US's political actions during the US invasion of Afghanistan. He was an ardent critic of the US's NSA. He was also noted as one of the original English language journalism teachers in Iran, with many current foreign based journalists and correspondents being taught by him. Homa Lezgee noted Golpira as her main journalism mentor during her time working for Iranian Press.

As cited in, King of Terror, Golpira remarked on the US' Occupation of Afghanistan saying;

Golpira was a fierce critic of contemporary Iranian cultural life, commenting on the growing influence of hypercapitalism on Iranian contemporary society.

In January 2015, Golpira was diagnosed with terminal lung cancer. He continued to work for both Press TV and Tehran Times until April 2015, also being awarded a special commendation by the Journalists Guild. Before his death, Golpira was also working on his book, Working for a Brighter Day, a collection of his selected articles.

== Death ==
Hamid Golpira died on Tuesday, July 7, 2015 in Tehran's Arad General Hospital where he was undergoing invasive chemotherapy for his lung cancer. He was buried on July, 9 at Tehran's Behesht-e Zahra cemetery in the Luminaries' Section. He is survived by his sister Roya. Alireza Ramezani of the Financial Tribune paper is quoted as saying, Golpira was the best editor at the Tehran Times during his time there.
