= Bam University of Medical Sciences =

- دانشگاه علوم پزشکی و خدمات بهداشتی درمانی بم
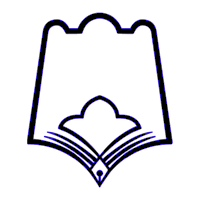
- Type: public
- Established: 1991
- Chancellor: Dr. Ali radfar
- Faculty: 98
- Students: 1000
- Location: Bam, Iran; 29.091362°N 58.318822°E
- Campus: urban
- Website: mubam.ac.ir

Bam University of Medical Sciences (mubam) is a medical sciences university in Bam, Kerman, Iran. The university has three school including medicine, health, and nursing & midwifery.

== History ==
Bam University of Medical Sciences was established in 2010 following the upgrade of Bam School of Nursing to an independent medical university under the Ministry of Health and Medical Education. The university officially commenced its activities in July 2011. Since its establishment, it has expanded its academic structure through the establishment of new schools and academic programs while providing healthcare and medical education for the eastern region of Kerman Province. Today, the university is responsible for both higher medical education and the delivery of public healthcare services in its service area.

== Schools ==
- School of Nursing and Midwifery
- School of Medicine
- School of Health

== Academic programmes ==
- Doctor of Medicine (MD)
- Nursing
- Midwifery
- Medical Laboratory Sciences
- Public Health
- Environmental Health Engineering
- Occupational Health and Safety Engineering
- Health Services Management
- Operating Room Technology
- Emergency Medical Services

== Healthcare facilities ==
=== Hospitals and medical centers ===
- Pasteur Hospital, Bam
- Javad Al-Aemeh Hospital, Narmashir
- Imam Ali Hospital, Fahraj
- Ayatollah Hashemi Rafsanjani Hospital, Rigan
- Al-Zahra Specialty Clinic, Bam
- Emergency Medical Services Center (EMS)

=== Health networks ===
- Bam Health Center
- Narmashir Health Network
- Gonbaci Health Center
- Fahraj Health Network
- Rigan Health Network

== See also ==
- List of Islamic educational institutions
- Healthcare in Iran
- Higher education in Iran
- List of hospitals in Iran
