= Imam =

Islamic leadership position

An imam in Tunisia leading the after praying duaa.

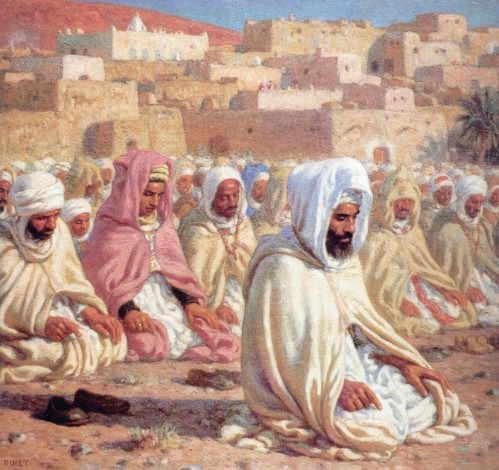
Imam presiding over prayer, Nasreddine Dinet, circa 1922.

Imam (/ɪˈmɑːm/; Arabic: إمام, imām; pl.: أئمة, a'immah) is a Muslim spiritual act of leading daily prayers. In Shia Islam, the imams are absolute infallible leaders after the Islamic prophet Muhammad. Shia Muslims consider the term to be only applicable to the members of the Ahl al-Bayt, the family of Muhammad. In Twelver Shi'ism there are The Fourteen Infallibles, twelve of which are imams. In Sunni Islam, an imam generally refers to a religious leader, scholar, or the person who leads Muslims in prayer. The position is not necessarily hereditary or divinely appointed. Thus in Sunni Islam, anyone can study the basic Islamic teachings and become an imam.

== Sunni Islam ==
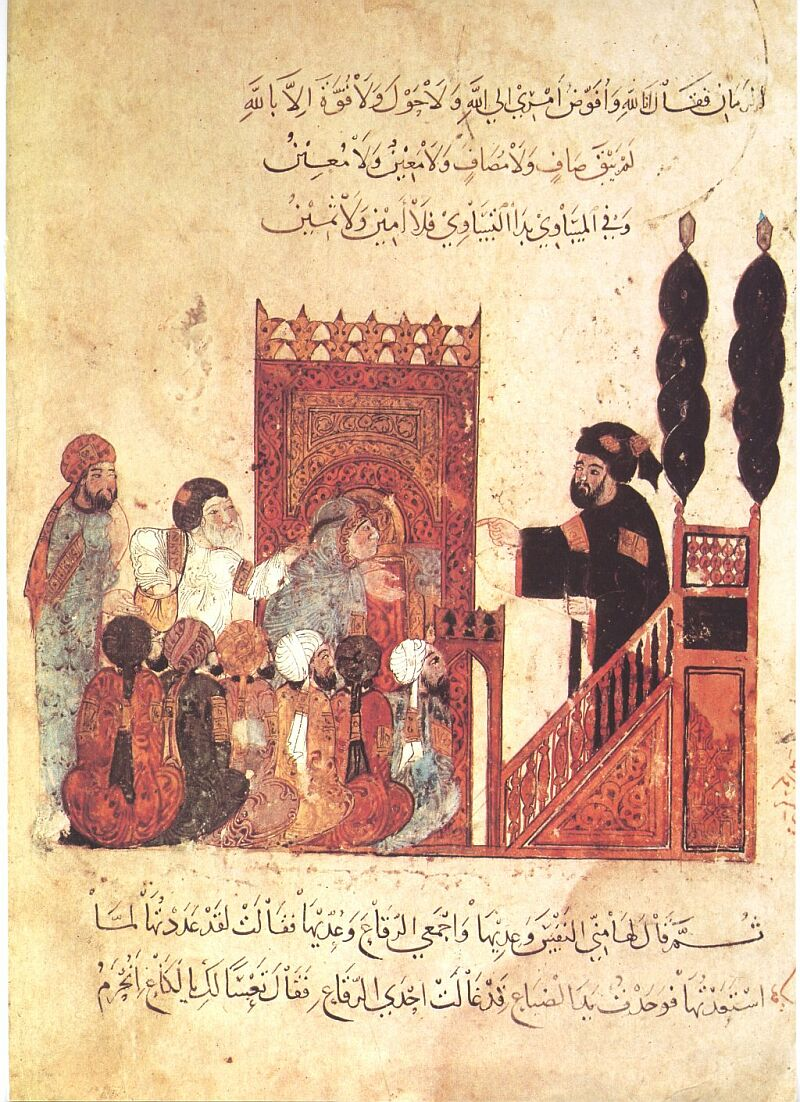
Abbasid Qadi acts as Imam delivers Khutbah in Mosque on the Minbar.

Sunni Islam does not conceive of the role of imams in the same sense as Shia Islam: an important distinction often overlooked by non-Muslims. In everyday terms, an imam for Sunni Muslims is the person charged with leading formal Islamic prayers (Fard) even in locations besides the mosque—whenever prayer is performed in a group of two or more. The imam leads the worship and the congregation copies his actions. Friday sermons are most often given by an appointed imam. All mosques have an imam to lead the congregational prayers—even though it may sometimes just be a member from the gathered congregation rather than an officially appointed, salaried person. Women cannot be imams when men are present but are allowed to be when no men are present. An imam should be chosen, according to multiple ahadith, based on his knowledge of the Qur'an and Sunnah and his moral character.

=== Title of scholarly authority ===
Another well-known use of the term is as an honorary title for a recognized religious scholarly authority in Islam. It is especially used for a jurist (faqih) and often for the founders of the four Sunni madhhabs or schools of jurisprudence (fiqh), as well as an authority on Quranic exegesis (tafsir), such as Al-Tabari or Ibn Kathir.

It may also refer to the Muhaddithūn or scholars who created the analytical sciences related to Hadith; due to their scholarly authority, the term may also refer to the heads of Muhammad's family in their generational times.

=== The position of imams in Turkey ===
Imams are appointed by the state to work at mosques and they are required to be graduates of an İmam Hatip high school or have a university degree in theology. This is an official position regulated by the Presidency of Religious Affairs in Turkey and only men are appointed to this position, whilst female officials under the same state organisation work as preachers and Qur'an course tutors, religious services experts, etc. These officials are supposed to belong to the Hanafi school of the Sunni sect.

A central figure in an Islamic movement is also called an imam, like Imam Nawawi in Syria.

== Shia Islam ==
In Shia Islam, an imam is not only presented as the man of God par excellence, but as participating fully in the names, attributes, and acts that theology usually reserves for God alone. Imams have a meaning more central to belief, referring to leaders of the community. Twelver and Ismaili Shi'a believe that these imams are chosen by God to be perfect examples for the faithful and to lead all humanity in all aspects of life. They also believe that all the imams chosen are free from committing any sin, impeccability which is called ismah. These leaders must be followed since they are appointed by God.

=== Twelver ===
Here follows a list of the Twelvers Shia imams:

Number	Name (Full/Kunya)	Title (Arabic/Turkish)	Birth–Death (CE/AH) (Note: The abbreviation CE refers to the Common Era solar calendar, while AH refers to the Islamic Hijri lunar calendar.)	Importance	Birthplace (present day country)	Place of death and burial
1	Ali ibn Abi Talib علي بن أبي طالب Abu al-Hassan or Abu al-Husayn أبو الحسین or أبو الحسن	Amir al-Mu'minin (Commander of the Faithful) Birinci Ali	600–661 23 BH–40	The first imam and successor of Muhammad in Shia Islam; however, the Sunnis acknowledge him as the fourth Caliph as well. He holds a high position in almost all Sufi Muslim orders (Turuq); the members of these orders trace their lineage to Muhammad through him.	Mecca, Saudi Arabia	Assassinated by Abd-al-Rahman ibn Muljam, a Kharijite in Kufa, who slashed him with a poisoned sword. Buried at the Imam Ali Mosque in Najaf, Iraq.
2	Hassan ibn Ali الحسن بن علي Abu Muhammad أبو محمد	al-Mujtaba İkinci Ali	624–670 3–50	He was the eldest surviving grandson of Muhammad through Muhammad's daughter, Fatimah Zahra. Hasan succeeded his father as the caliph in Kufa, and on the basis of peace treaty with Muawiya I, he relinquished control of Iraq following a reign of seven months.	Medina, Saudi Arabia	Poisoned by his wife in Medina, Saudi Arabia. Buried in Jannat al-Baqi.
3	Husayn ibn Ali الحسین بن علي Abu Abdillah أبو عبدالله	Sayed al-Shuhada Üçüncü Ali	626–680 4–61	He was a grandson of Muhammad. Husayn opposed the validity of Caliph Yazid I. As a result, he and his family were later killed in the Battle of Karbala by Yazid's forces. After this incident, the commemoration of Husayn ibn Ali has become a central ritual in Shia identity.	Medina, Saudi Arabia	Killed on Day of Ashura (10 Muharram) and beheaded at the Battle of Karbala. Buried at the Imam Husayn Shrine in Karbala, Iraq.
4	Ali ibn al-Hussein علي بن الحسین Abu Muhammad أبو محمد	al-Sajjad, Zain al-Abedin Dördüncü Ali	658–9 – 712 38–95	Author of prayers in Sahifa al-Sajjadiyya, which is known as "The Psalm of the Household of the Prophet."	Medina, Saudi Arabia	According to most Shia scholars, he was poisoned on the order of Caliph al-Walid I in Medina, Saudi Arabia. Buried in Jannat al-Baqi.
5	Muhammad ibn Ali محمد بن علي Abu Ja'far أبو جعفر	al-Baqir al-Ulum (splitting open knowledge) Beşinci Ali	677–732 57–114	Sunni and Shia sources both describe him as one of the early and most eminent legal scholars, teaching many students during his tenure.	Medina, Saudi Arabia	According to some Shia scholars, he was poisoned by Ibrahim ibn Walid ibn 'Abdallah in Medina, Saudi Arabia on the order of Caliph Hisham ibn Abd al-Malik. Buried in Jannat al-Baqi.
6	Ja'far ibn Muhammad جعفر بن محمد Abu Abdillah أبو عبدالله	al-Sadiq (the Trustworthy) Altıncı Ali	702–765 83–148	Established the Ja'fari jurisprudence and developed the Theology of Shia. He instructed many scholars in different fields, including Abu Hanifah and Malik ibn Anas in fiqh, Wasil ibn Ata and Hisham ibn Hakam in Islamic theology, and Jābir ibn Hayyān in science and alchemy.	Medina, Saudi Arabia	According to Shia sources, he was poisoned in Medina, Saudi Arabia on the order of Caliph Al-Mansur. Buried in Jannat al-Baqi.
7	Musa ibn Ja'far موسی بن جعفر Abu al-Hassan I أبو الحسن الأول	al-Kazim Yedinci Ali	744–799 128–183	Leader of the Shia community during the schism of Ismaili and other branches after the death of the former imam, Jafar al-Sadiq. He established the network of agents who collected khums in the Shia community of the Middle East and the Greater Khorasan.	Medina, Saudi Arabia	Imprisoned and poisoned in Baghdad, Iraq on the order of Caliph Harun al-Rashid. Buried in the Kazimayn shrine in Baghdad.
8	Ali ibn Musa علي بن موسی	al-Rida, Reza Sekizinci Ali	765–818 148–203	Made crown-prince by Caliph Al-Ma'mun, and famous for his discussions with both Muslim and non-Muslim religious scholars.	Medina, Saudi Arabia	He was poisoned by the order of Caliph Al-Ma'mun. Buried in the Imam Reza Shrine in Mashhad, Iran.
9	Muhammad ibn Ali محمد بن علي Abu Ja'far أبو جعفر	al-Taqi, al-Jawad Dokuzuncu Ali	810–835 195–220	Famous for his generosity and piety in the face of persecution by the Abbasid caliphate.	Medina, Saudi Arabia	Poisoned by his wife, Al-Ma'mun's daughter, in Baghdad, Iraq on the order of Caliph Al-Mu'tasim. Buried in the Kazmain shrine in Baghdad.
10	Ali ibn Muhammad علي بن محمد Abu al-Hassan III أبو الحسن الثالث	al-Hadi, al-Naqi Onuncu Ali	827–868 212–254	Strengthened the network of deputies in the Shia community. He sent them instructions, and received in turn financial contributions of the faithful from the khums and religious vows.	Surayya, a village near Medina, Saudi Arabia	According to Shia sources, he was poisoned in Samarra, Iraq on the order of Caliph Al-Mu'tazz. Buried in the Al Askari Mosque in Samarra.
11	Hassan ibn Ali الحسن بن علي Abu Muhammad أبو محمد	al-Askari Onbirinci Ali	846–874 232–260	For most of his life, the Abbasid Caliph, Al-Mu'tamid, placed restrictions on him after the death of his father. Repression of the Shi'ite population was particularly high at the time due to their large size and growing power.	Medina, Saudi Arabia	According to Shia, he was poisoned on the order of Caliph Al-Mu'tamid in Samarra, Iraq. Buried in Al Askari Mosque in Samarra.
12	Muhammad ibn al-Hassan محمد بن الحسن Abu al-Qasim أبو القاسم	al-Mahdi, Hidden Imam, al-Hujjah Onikinci Ali	868–unknown 255–unknown	According to Twelver doctrine, he is the current imam and the promised Mahdi, a messianic figure who will return with Isa (Jesus). He will reestablish the rightful governance of Islam and replete the earth with justice and peace.	Samarra, Iraq	According to Shia doctrine, he has been living in the Occultation since 872, which shall continue as long as God wills it.

Fatimah, also Fatimah al-Zahraa, daughter of Muhammed (615–632), is also considered infallible but not an imam. Shia Muslims believe that the last imam, the 12th imam Mahdi will emerge on the Day of Resurrection (Qiyamah). The title was also used by the Zaidi Shia imams of Yemen, who eventually founded the Mutawakkilite Kingdom of Yemen (1918–1970).

=== Ismaili ===
See Imamah (Ismaili doctrine) and List of Ismaili imams for Ismaili imams.

=== Zaidi ===
See details under Zaidiyyah, Islamic history of Yemen and imams of Yemen.

== Imams as secular rulers ==
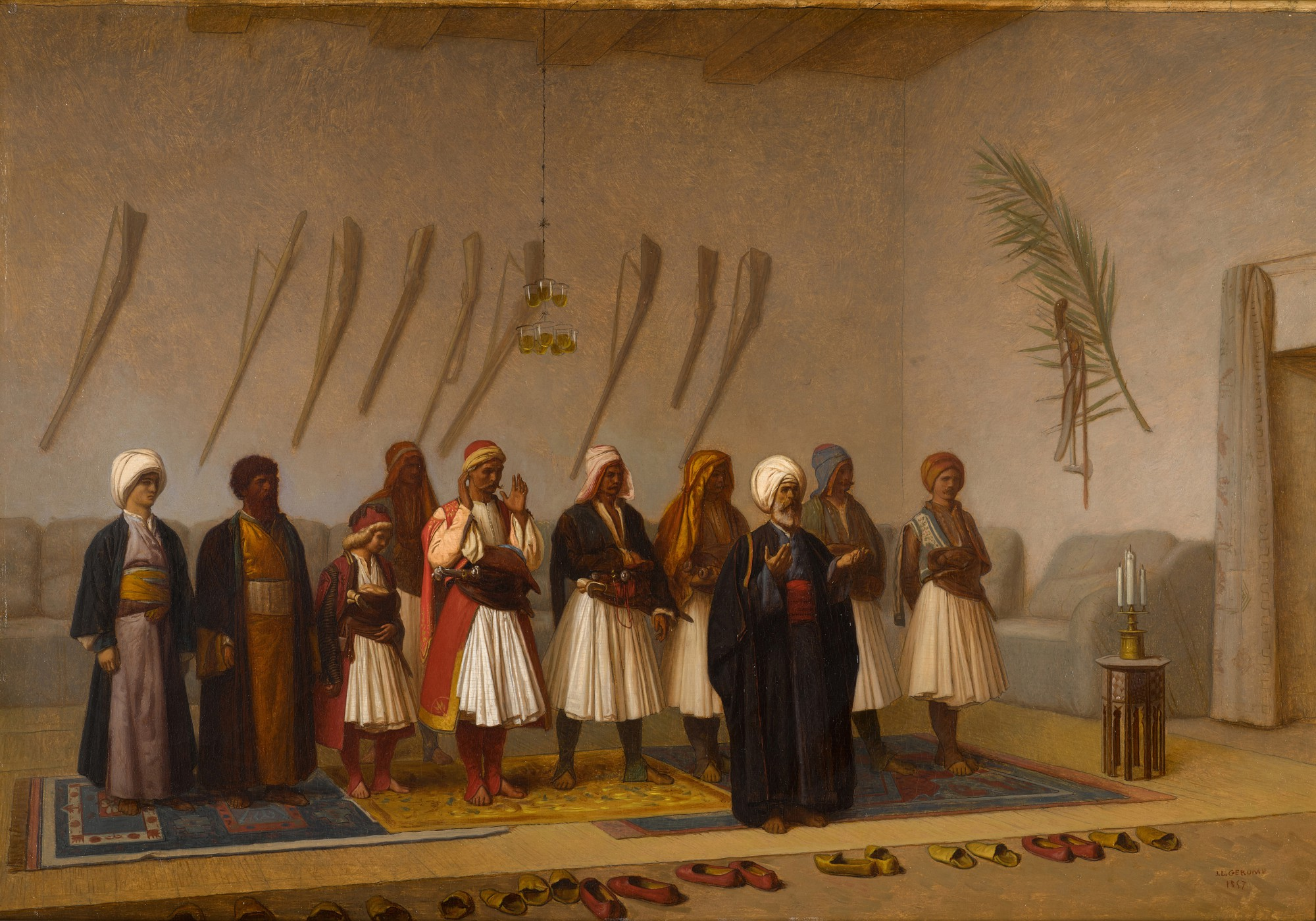
Prayer in the House of the Arnaut Chief, painting by Jean-Léon Gérôme,1857

At times, imams have held both secular and religious authority. This was the case in Oman among the Kharijite or Ibadi sects. At times, the imams were elected. At other times the position was inherited, as with the Yaruba dynasty from 1624 and 1742. See List of rulers of Oman, the Rustamid dynasty: 776–909, Nabhani dynasty: 1154–1624, the Yaruba dynasty: 1624–1742, the Al Said: 1744–present for further information. The Imamate of Futa Jallon (1727–1896) was a Fulani state in West Africa where secular power alternated between two lines of hereditary imams, or almami. In the Zaidi Shiite sect, imams were secular as well as spiritual leaders who held power in Yemen for more than a thousand years. In 897, a Zaidi ruler, al-Hadi ila'l-Haqq Yahya, founded a line of such imams, a theocratic form of government which survived until the second half of the 20th century (See details under Zaidiyyah, History of Yemen, Imams of Yemen).

Ruhollah Khomeini is officially referred to as imam in Iran. Several Iranian places and institutions are named "Imam Khomeini", including a city, an international airport, a hospital, and a university.

== Gallery ==
=== Imams ===
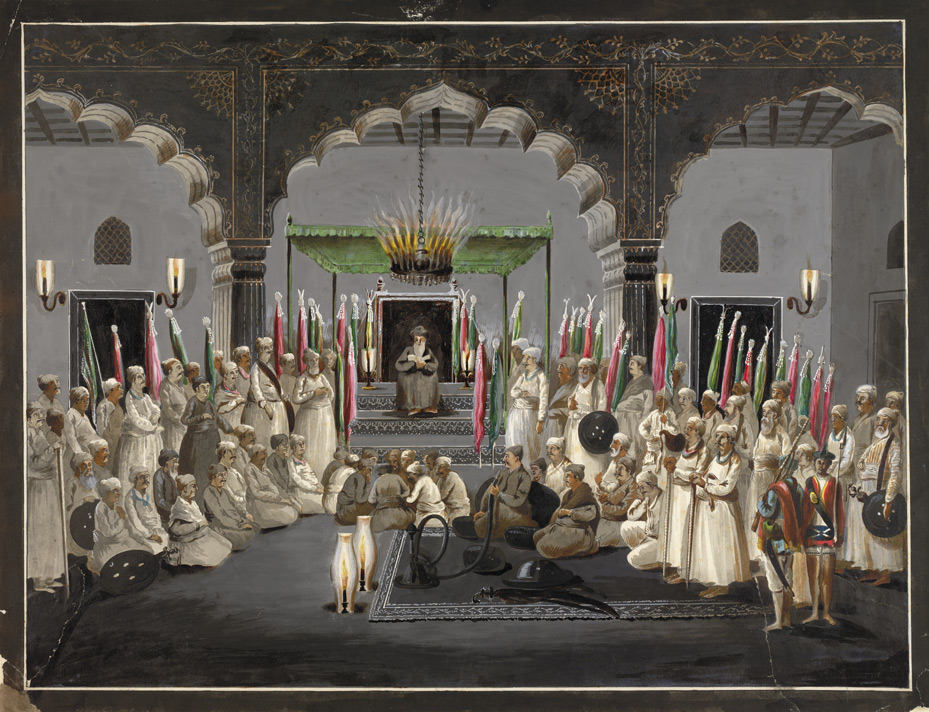
An imam reads verses from the Quran after Isha' (night prayers) in the Mughal Empire

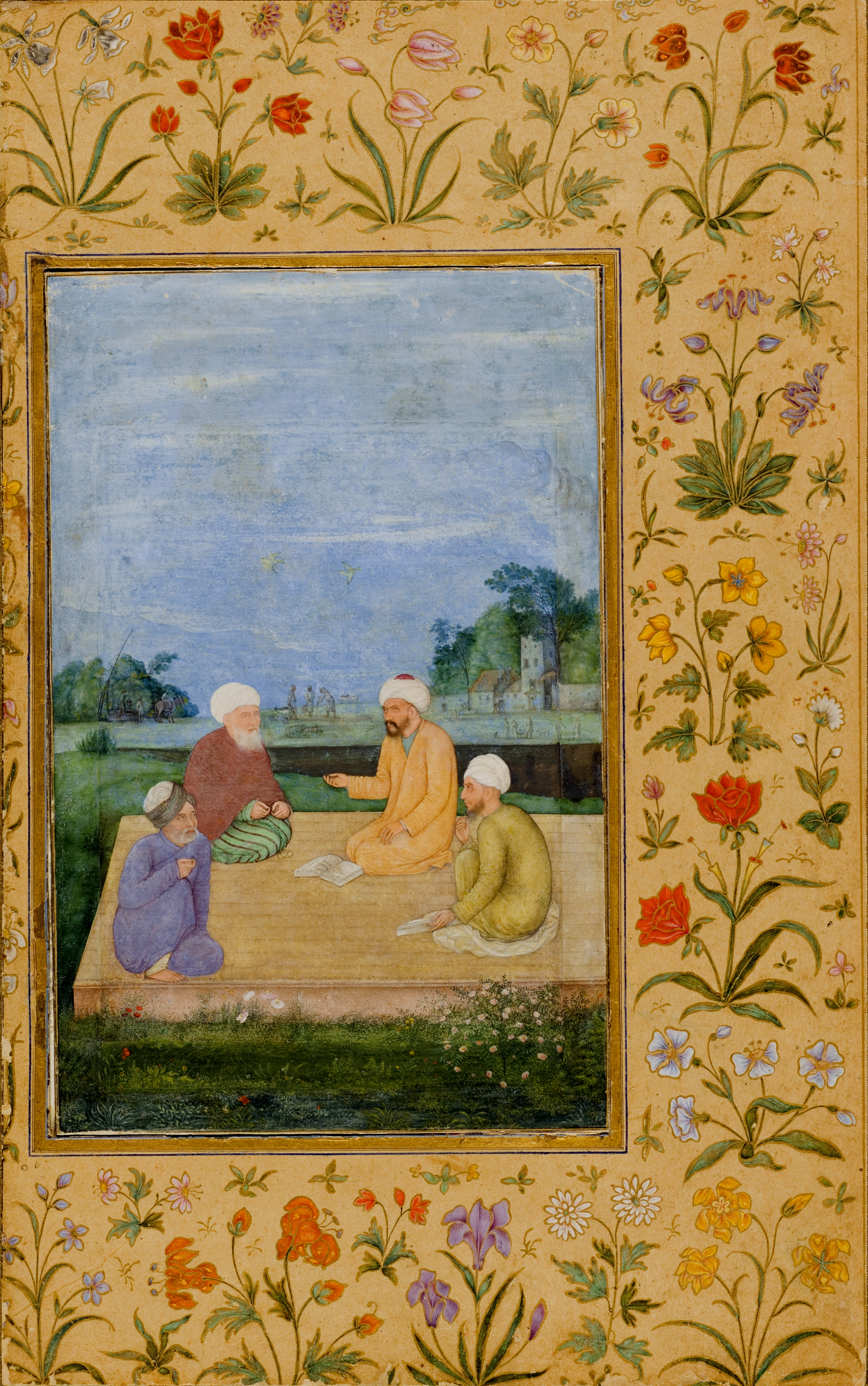
Discourse between Islamic imams in the Mughal Empire

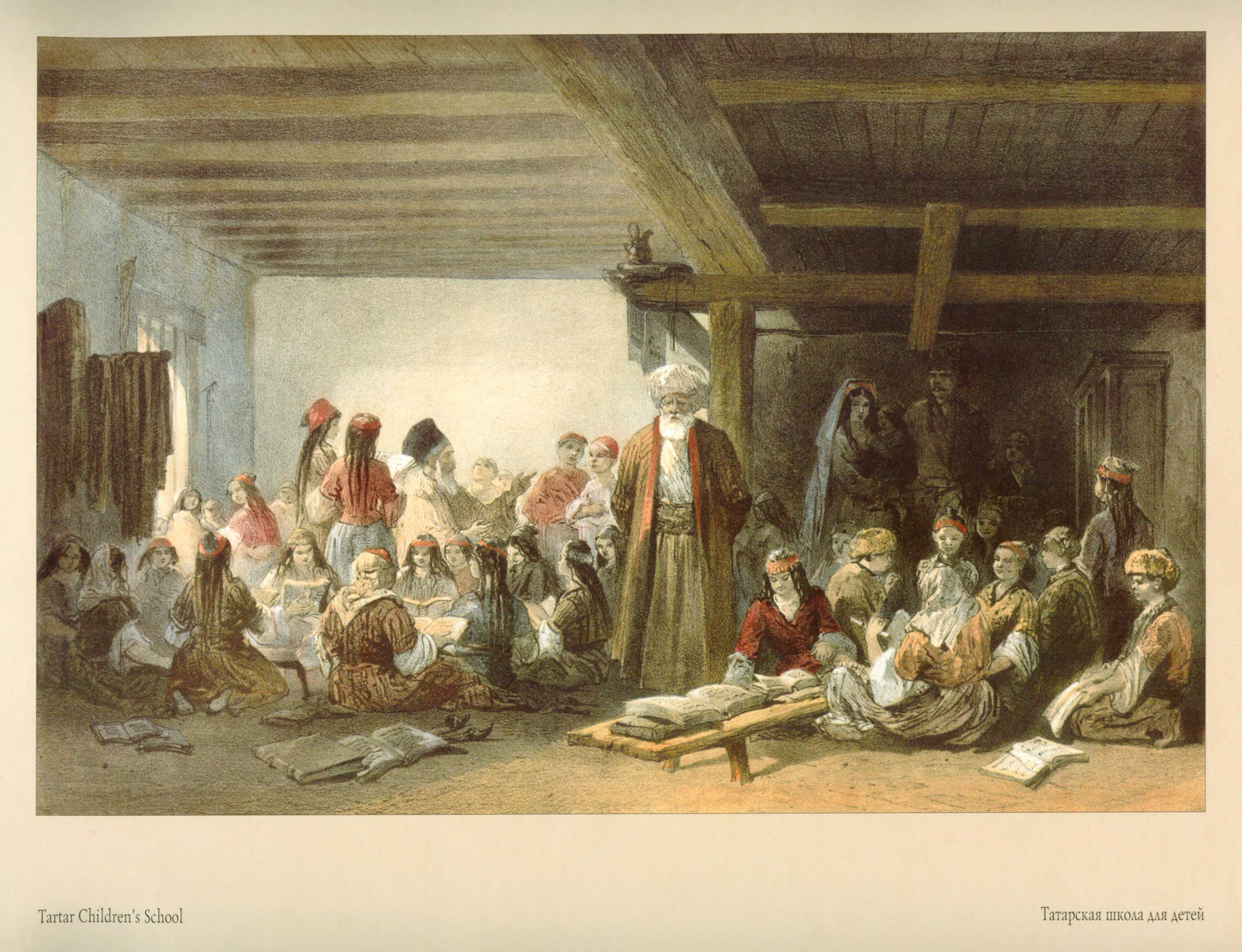
Crimean Tatar imams teach the Quran. Lithograph by Carlo Bossoli

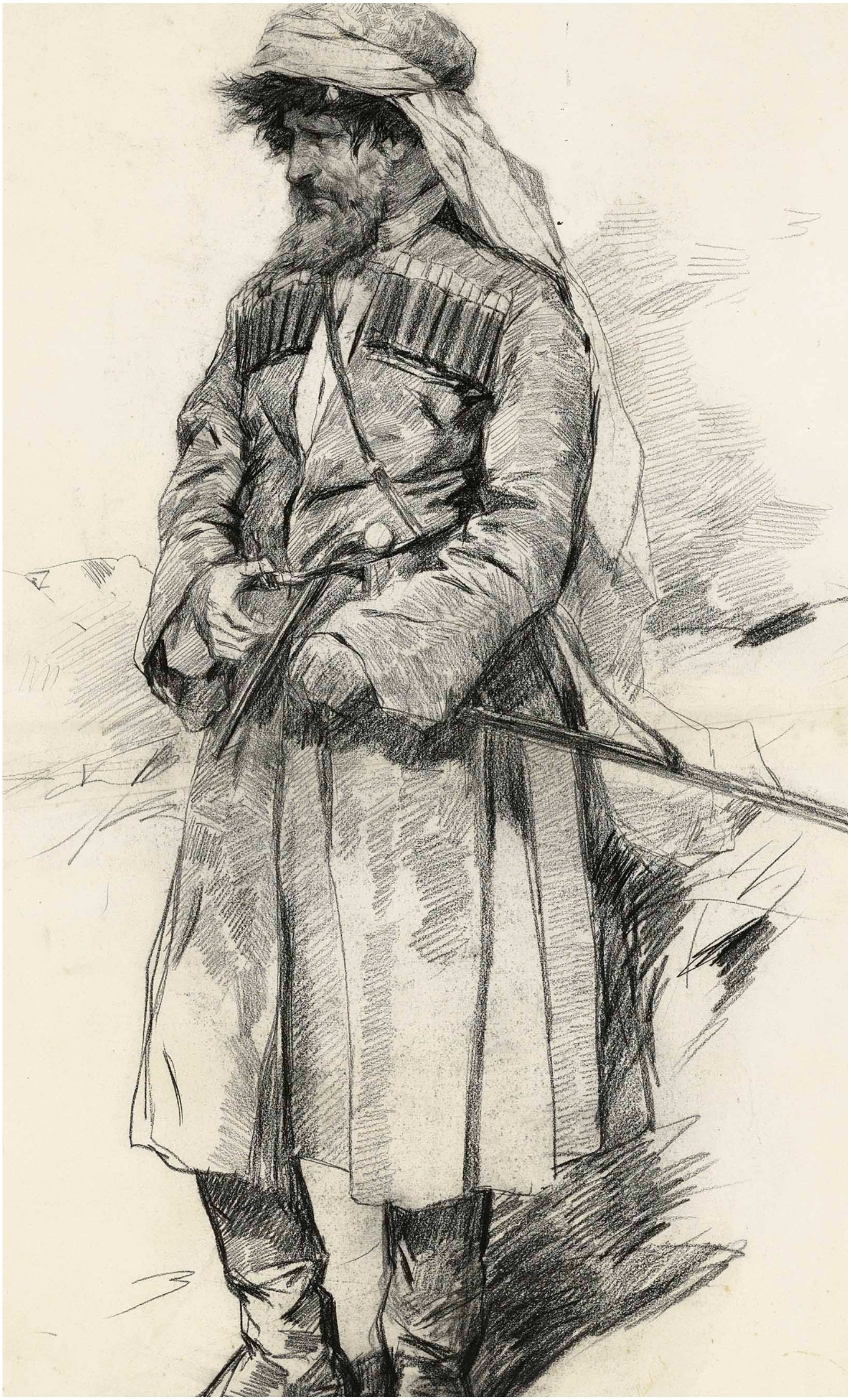
Imam Shamil, Caucasus

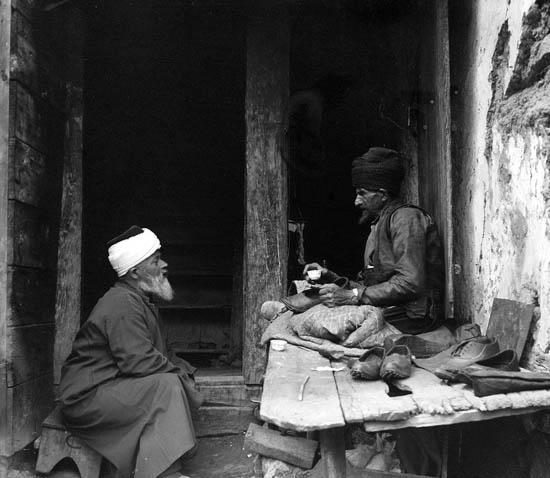
Imam in Bosnia, c. 1906

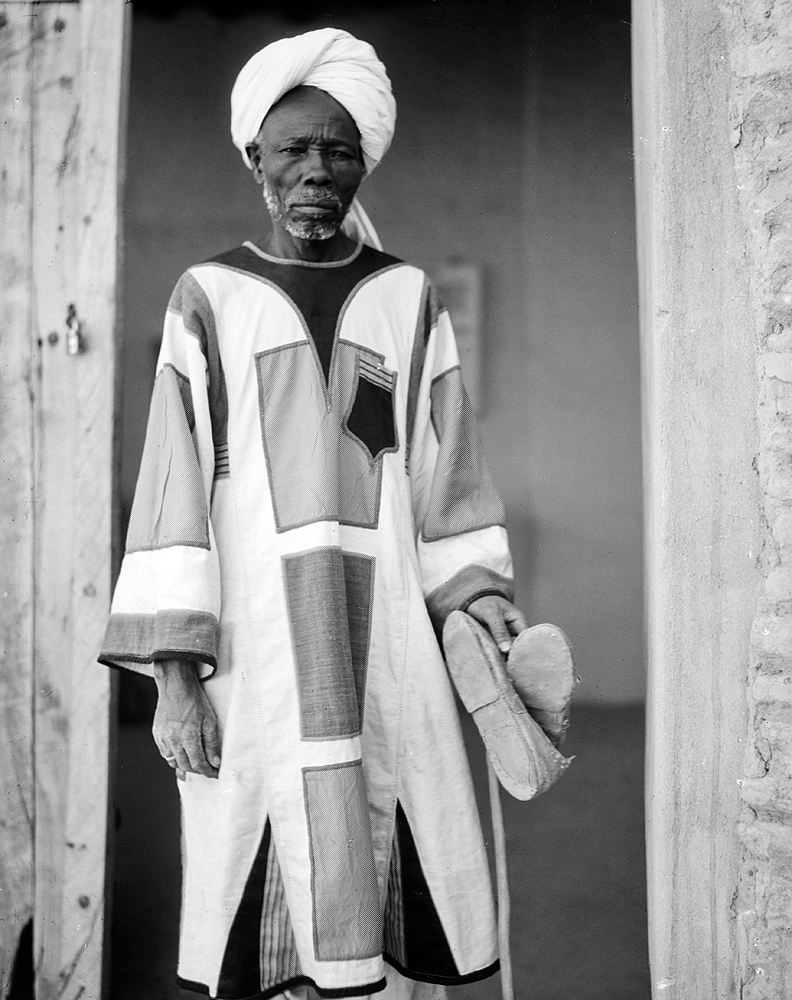
An Imam in Omdurman, Sudan

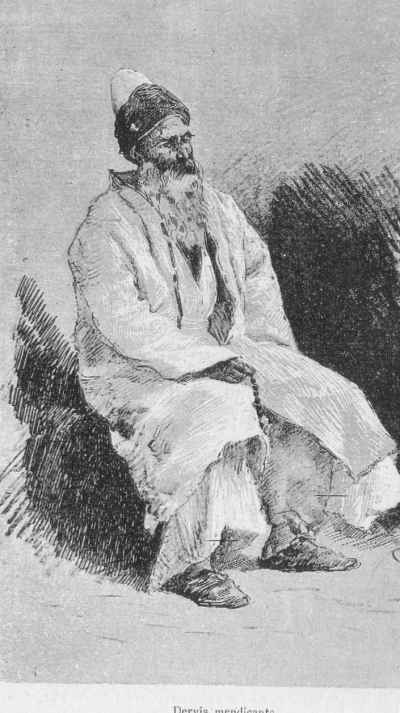
An Ottoman imam in Constantinople

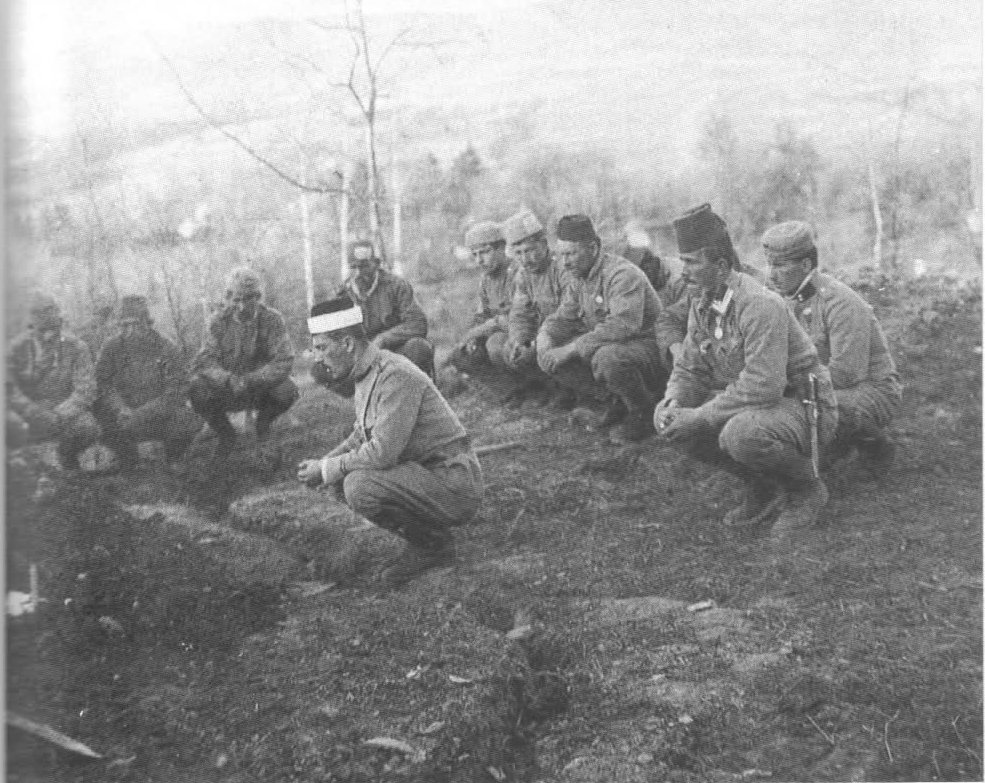
A Bosniak military imam in the Austro-Hungarian Army

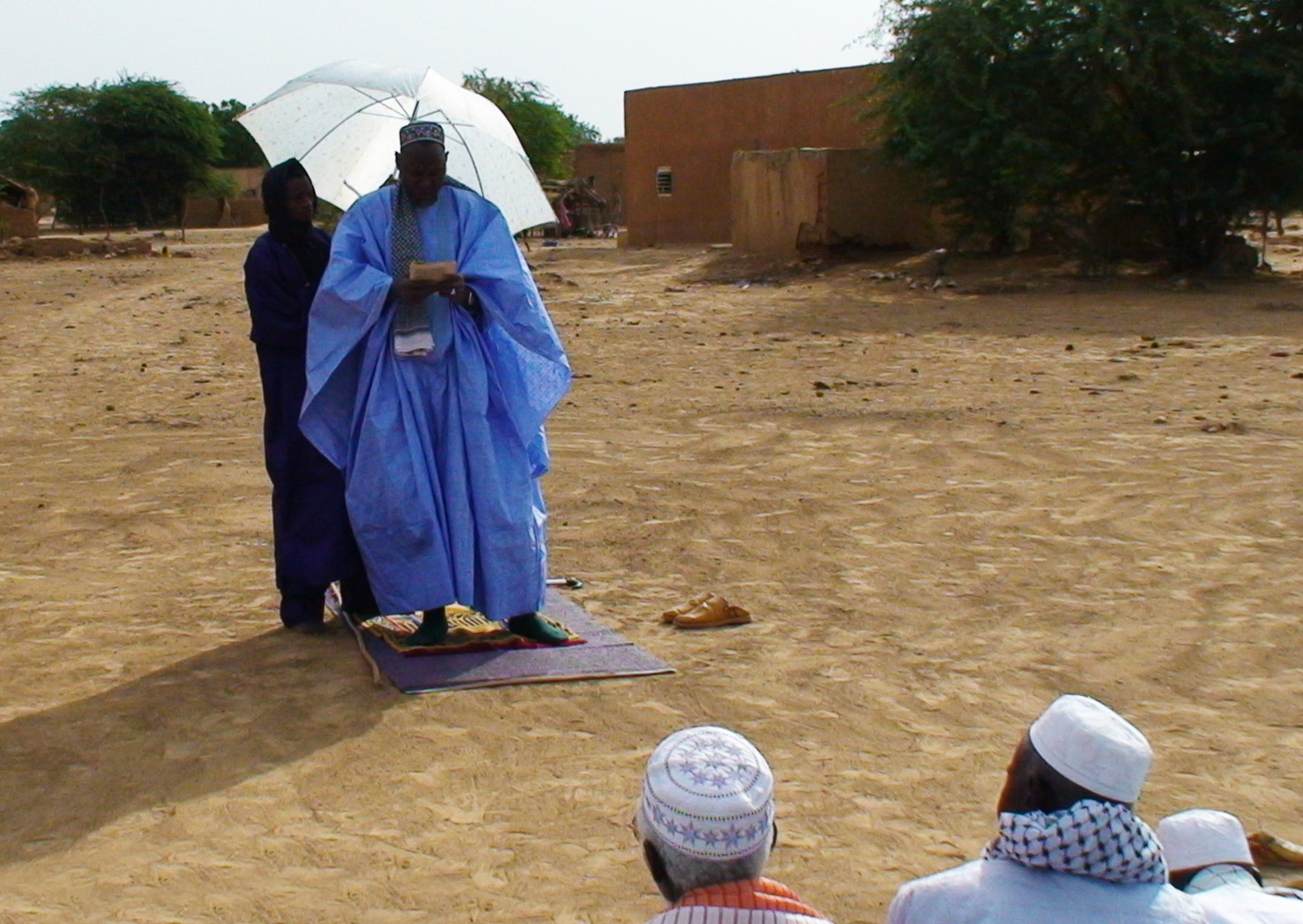
Imam Thierno Ibrahima Thiello

== See also ==
- Ayatollah
- Imam of Friday Prayer
- Imamate
- Mufti
- Twelver Shia holy days
- Seghatoleslam
- Mohyeddin

== Works cited ==
- Corbin, Henry (1993) [1964]. History of Islamic Philosophy (in French). Translated by Sherrard, Liadain; Sherrard, Philip. London; Kegan Paul International in association with Islamic Publications for The Institute of Ismaili Studies. ISBN 0-7103-0416-1.
- Encyclopædia Britannica Online by Encyclopædia Britannica, Inc.
- Encyclopædia Iranica. Center for Iranian Studies, Columbia University. March 1997. ISBN 1-56859-050-4.
- Mattar, Philip (2004). Encyclopedia of the modern Middle East & North Africa. Detroit, Mich: Macmillan Reference USA. ISBN 9780028657691.
- Sachedina, Abdulaziz Abdulhussein (1988). The Just Ruler (al-sultān Al-ʻādil) in Shīʻite Islam: The Comprehensive Authority of the Jurist in Imamite Jurisprudence. Oxford University Press US. ISBN 0-19-511915-0.
- Tabatabae, Sayyid Mohammad Hosayn (1979). Shi'ite Islam. Translated by Nasr, Seyyed Hossein. SUNY press. ISBN 0-87395-272-3.

== General references ==
- Martin, Richard C. (2004). "Imam". Encyclopaedia of Islam and the Muslim World. Vol. 1: Encyclopedia of Islam and the Muslim World: A–L. MacMillan. ISBN 0-02-865604-0.
- Momen, Moojan (1985). An Introduction to Shi'i Islam: The History and Doctrines of Twelve. Yale University Press. ISBN 0-300-03531-4.
