= Ali Fathi-Ashtiani =

Iranian chemist

- علی فتحی آشتیانی
- Scientific career
- Fields: psychology
- Institutions: Baqiyatallah University of Medical Sciences

Ali Fathi-Ashtiani is an Iranian psychologist and Professor of Behavioral Sciences at Baqiyatallah University of Medical Sciences. He was also the head of Iranian Psychology and Counselling Organization and a permanent member of the Iranian Academy of Medical Sciences. Fathi-Ashtiani is the editor-in-chief of the International Journal of Behavioral Sciences and the Journal of Psychology.

== Books ==
- Psychological Tests, Tehran: Besat Pub. 2022
- An Introduction to Political Psychology, Tehran: Besat Pub. 2008
- Psychological Pathology, Tehran: SAMT Pub. 2022
- Behavioral Modification, Tehran: SAMT Pub. 2020
- Health Psychology, Tehran: Besat Pub. 2015
- Cultural Psychology, Tehran: SAMT Pub. 2022
- Child Psychology, Tehran: Besat Pub. 2014
- Personality Disorders, Tehran: Besat Pub. 2019
- The Psychology of Prayer, Tehran: Arjmand Pub. 2019
- The Anxious Perfectionist, Tehran: Besat Pub. 2024
- Mental Health and COVID-19 in Essays on Health and COVID-19 Crisis, Tehran: Narvan Pub: 2021
