= Minoo Mohraz =

Iranian physician, researcher and AIDS specialist

- مينو محرز
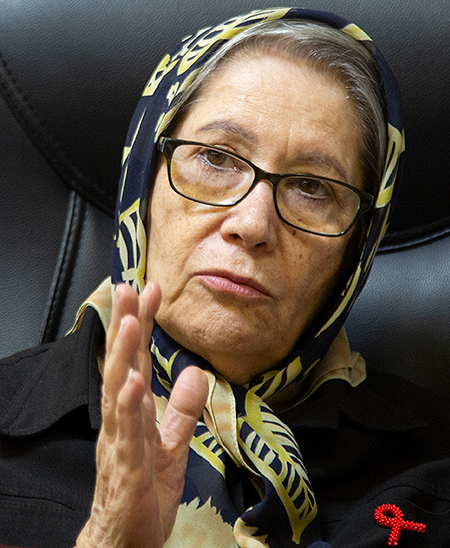
- Mohraz in 2020
- Born: 19 January 1946 (age 80); Tehran, Imperial State of Iran
- Occupations: Physician, researcher, professor
- Known for: AIDS specialist and Infectious disease specialist

Minoo Mohraz (Persian: مينو محرز, born 19 January 1946) is an Iranian physician, researcher and AIDS specialist. She is a full professor (emeritus) of Infectious Diseases at the Tehran University of Medical Sciences and head of the Iranian Centre for HIV/AIDS. Mohraz has been considered to be Iran's foremost medical expert on HIV/AIDS.

== Biography ==
Mohraz was born in Tehran, Iran, on 19 January 1946. She graduated from Tehran Medical School in 1970 and completed her training in public health and specialising in infectious diseases in 1973. She became Professor of Infectious Diseases at the Tehran University of Medical Sciences the same year.

Mohraz is an ardent campaigner on behalf of the HIV/AIDS community in Iran, lobbying politicians and clerics to support awareness campaigns on the disease. In 2001, Mohraz was invited to an interview with Iranian national television to spread awareness about sexual behaviour and HIV/AIDS. However, her precondition was that her talk should not be censored. During her talk, Mohraz used the word 'condom' live on air, despite the word being banned on broadcasting media.

Mohraz's pragmatic approach towards HIV/AIDS, her secular identity, promotion of public awareness campaigns, and encouraging safer sexual practices led to her becoming a recognised face of the AIDS movement in Iran.

In 2007, Mohraz was considered to be Iran's foremost medical expert on HIV/AIDS. She has run a specialised HIV/AIDS clinic at Imam Khomeini Hospital Complex in Tehran, considered to be the largest such clinic in the country.

During the COVID-19 pandemic in Iran, she was appointed a member of committee to combat coronavirus. On 14 March, Iranian media reported that she had been infected with SARS-CoV-2, the virus that causes coronavirus disease 2019.

== Research ==
Mohraz has contributed to numerous publications. She found that there was a high incidence of male prisoners engaging in sex with other male prisoners in Iranian prisons, greatly increasing the risk of HIV transmission. Under Mohraz's leadership, the Iranian Research Center for HIV/AIDS developed an immunomodulator drug (IMOD) composed of seven native Iranian herbs for use as an adjunct medication with HAART medications in HIV patients.
