= Sotirios Prapas =

Greek cardiac surgeon

Sotirios Prapas (Larissa, 1954) is a Greek cardiac surgeon.

== Education ==
Prapas graduated from the Medical School of the Aristotle University of Thessaloniki and had his training in Cardiothoracic Surgery under Professor Panagiotis Spyrou (1936-2012) at the “G. Papanikolaou” Hospital in Thessaloniki. He continued his postgraduate training at the Royal Brompton Hospital of London for two years as a locum doctor and then worked at the “Onassis Cardiac Surgery Centre” for 8 years. He organized in 2001, the Department of Cardiac Surgery at the “Henry Dunant” Hospital and is the Director ever since.

== Career ==
He often applies off-pump coronary surgery (OPCAB), using the arterial “π-graft” technique as supplemental to the OPCAB method, by applying off-Pump, aorta non-touch, and total arterial revascularization.

In 2005, Dr. Prapas implemented in Greece a combination of an Off-Pump surgical treatment and autologous bone-marrow implantation which appears to improve the patients’ functional status. This treatment though has never been proven to improve heart function in the context of established ischemic heart damage and recent research has cast a shadow on its safety and efficacy.

His academic work consists of papers and abstract publications in medical journals, presentations in many international congresses, lectures around the world as well as a series of live demonstrations. He holds a PhD from the National and Kapodistrian University of Athens. He has taught in the European School of Cardiac Surgery in Bergamo in 2009.

== Academic appointments ==
- Prapas and Prof. M. Tourina were assigned by the “Razavi Hospital” Board of Directors, to establish the “Iranian School for Cardio-Thoracic Surgery”, in Mashhad, Iran.
- Chairman of the 18th W.S.C.T.S. Congress in Kos island, Greece in 2008.
- Chancellor of “THE EURO-ASIAN BRIDGE” Society, a link between Cardiac Surgeons from 28 countries, from Balkans and Middle East, which he personally inspired and created in 2004, promoting the cooperation and friendship among neighbor colleagues.
- Since 2012, is the Vice Chancellor of the World Society of Cardiothoracic Surgeons (W.S.C.T.S).
- He is also member in 10 international societies, including the American STS, the ISMICS, the Europeans’ E.A.C.T.S. and ESCVS, the ASCVTS and others.
