= Noor Eye Hospital =

- Noor Ophthalmology Complex

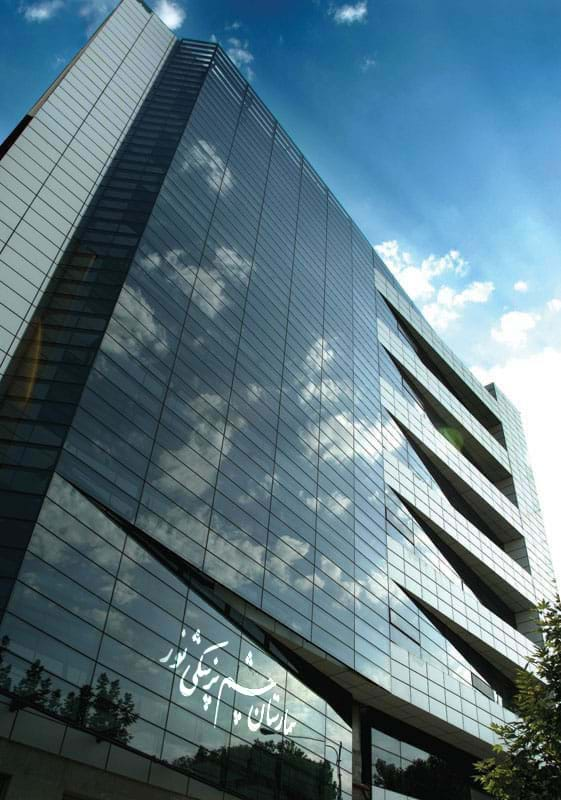

Geography
- Location: No. 96, Esfandiar Blvd., Vali’asr Ave, Tehran, Iran
- Coordinates: 35.4616°N 51.2445°E

Organisation
- Care system: Private
- Type: Specialist
- Patron: Hassan Hashemi
- Network: Noor Ophthalmology Complex

Services
- Emergency department: Yes
- Speciality: Ophthalmology

History
- Founded: 2007

Links
- Website: noorvision.com
- Lists: Hospitals in Iran

Noor Eye Hospital (Persian: بیمارستان چشم‌پزشکی نور) is an ophthalmological hospital located in Tehran. It is a branch of Noor Ophthalmology Complex.

The hospital is considered a "pioneer" in Iran and has high standards in technology in the region. The costs are also lower compared to other private hospitals in the region.
