= Global Journal of Environmental Science and Management =

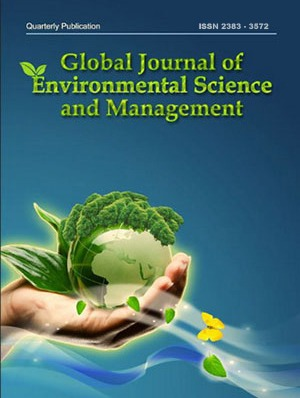
- Discipline: Environmental science
- Language: English
- Edited by: Jafar Nouri

Publication details
- History: 2015–present
- Publisher: GJESM Publisher
- Frequency: Quarterly
- Open access: Yes
- License: CC-BY 4.0

Standard abbreviations
- ISO 4: Glob. J. Environ. Sci. Manag.

Indexing
- ISSN: 2383-3572 (print); 2383-3866 (web)
- OCLC no.: 910276297

Links
- Journal homepage; Online access; Online archive

The Global Journal of Environmental Science and Management is a quarterly peer-reviewed open access academic journal covering environmental management. It was established in 2015. The founding and current editor-in-chief is Jafar Nouri (Tehran University of Medical Sciences).

== Abstracting and indexing ==
The journal is indexed and abstracted in the following bibliographic databases:

- CAB Abstracts
- EBSCO databases
- Emerging Sources Citation Index
- Scopus
