= Baqiyatallah University of Medical Sciences =

University in Tehran, Iran

Coordinates: 35°45′10.9″N 51°23′35.3″E

Baqiyatallah Medical Sciences University
- دانشگاه علوم پزشكي بقيةالله; Danushgah-e 'lum-e Pezeshki-ye Beqitallâh
- Type: Public
- Established: 1994
- Faculty: 640
- Students: 3000
- Location: Tehran, Tehran Province, Iran
- Campus: Urban
- Website: www.bmsu.ac.ir

Baqiyatallah University of Medical Sciences (بقية‌الله lit. What is Left ˹as a Lawful Gain˺ by Allah) (BMSU) is a public and special medical university in Tehran, Iran.

The BMSU was founded in 1994 as the primary medical institution for the Islamic Revolutionary Guard Corps (IRGC). The BMSU as well as the Institute of Research for Military Medicine (Persian: پژوهشكده طب رزمي) is operated by the IRGC and trains students up to Ph.D.

The BMSU operates three hospitals, among them the large Baqiyatallah Hospital near Vanak, Tehran, as well as a dental hospital. The Baqiyatallah hospital and University are established by Islamic Revolutionary Guard Corps (Sepah Pasdaran military organisation).

== Schools ==
Medical School
Nursing School
Public Health School
Dentistry School
Pharmacy School

== Notable faculty ==
- Ali Fathi-Ashtiani

== See also ==
- List of universities in Iran
- List of hospitals in Iran
