= Alejalil Hospital =

Geography
- Location: Golestan, Aq Qala, Golestan, Iran
- Coordinates: 36.998119°N 54.449087°E

Organisation
- Type: General

Services
- Emergency department: Yes
- Beds: 113

History
- Opened: 12 May 2005; 21 years ago

Links
- Lists: Hospitals in Iran

Alejalil Hospital is a general hospital and the only hospital in Aq Qala, Iran, founded in 2005 by Haj Aghi Alejalil, an Iranian philanthropist.

In 1985, construction of the hospital building began at its current site through the initiative of Dr. Salehi and the support of the benefactor Haj Agha Al-Jalil. The facility, later named Alejalil (or Al-Jalil) Hospital, was officially opened in late 2006.

Affiliated with Golestan University of Medical Sciences, the hospital serves Aq Qala County on a 30,000 m^{2} site with 10,030 m^{2} of facilities. It has approximately 125 beds across multiple specialized wards and provides outpatient and inpatient care, emergency services, dialysis, radiology, laboratory services, and specialty clinics, including Imam Sajjad for cardiac and respiratory testing.
