= Noor Ophthalmology Complex =

Hospital network in Iran

- Type: Private
- Industry: Health care
- Founded: 1993; 33 years ago
- Founder: Hassan Hashemi
- Headquarters: Tehran, Iran
- Number of locations: 4
- Area served: Tehran Province, Alborz Province
- Services: Hospital network
- Website: noorvision.com

Noor Ophthalmology Complex (Persian: مجتمع چشم‌پزشکی نور) is a hospital network in Iran. The organization was founded in 1993 by Hassan Hashemi and owns facilities in Tehran and Karaj. The network established the first ophthalmology subspeciality clinic in Iran.

== List of facilities ==
- Noor Eye Hospital
- Noor Ophthalmology Research Center
- Alborz Noor Eye Clinic
- Motahari Eye Clinic
- Noor Excimer Laser Clinic
