= Ayatollah Mousavi Hospital =

Hospital in Zanjan, Iran

Geography
- Location: Zanjan, Zanjan County, Iran
- Coordinates: 36.700703°N 48.508925°E

Organisation
- Type: General

Services
- Emergency department: Yes

History
- Opened: 2007

Links
- Lists: Hospitals in Iran

Ayatollah Mousavi Hospital (Persian: بیمارستان آیت‌الله موسوی) is a public hospital located in Zanjan and currently has a capacity of 620 beds.
