= Sina Hospital =

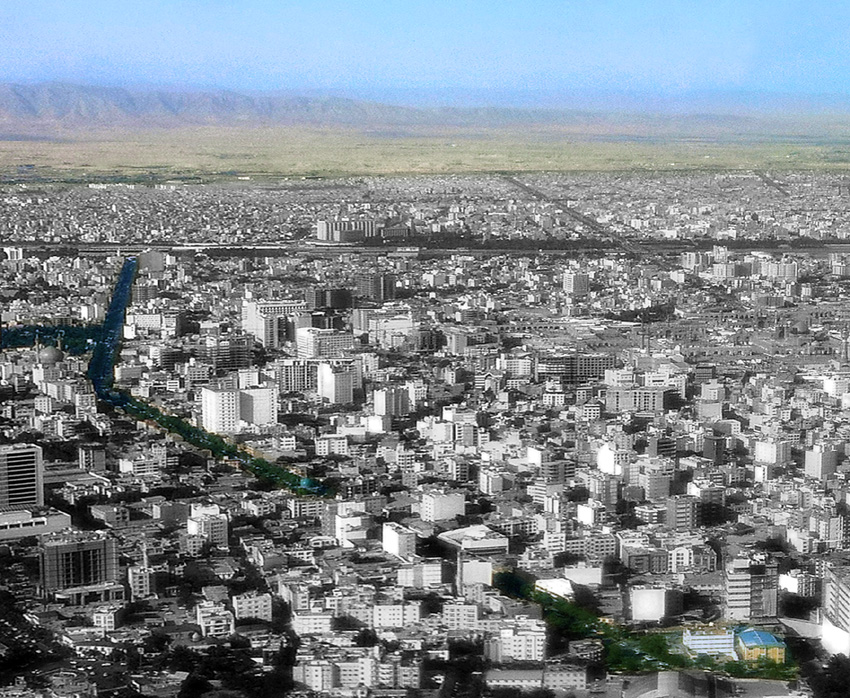

Geography
- Location: Mashhad, Razavi Khorasan Province, Iran
- Coordinates: 36.28170°N 59.60034°E

Organisation
- Type: General

Services
- Beds: 128

History
- Opened: 1873

Links
- Website: sinahosp.ir
- Lists: Hospitals in Iran

Sina Hospital Mashhad is a private hospital located in Mashhad, Iran and currently has a capacity of 128 beds.
