= Sayad Shirazi Hospital =

Geography
- Location: Gorgan, Gorgan County, Golestan, Iran
- Coordinates: 36.822358°N 54.435235°E

Organisation
- Care system: Public
- Type: District General

Services
- Emergency department: Yes

History
- Opened: 2012

Links
- Lists: Hospitals in Iran

Sayad Shirazi Hospital is a public hospital located in Gorgan, Iran and currently has a capacity of 300 beds.
