= Hassan Ghazizadeh Hashemi =

Iranian combat engineer (born 1959)

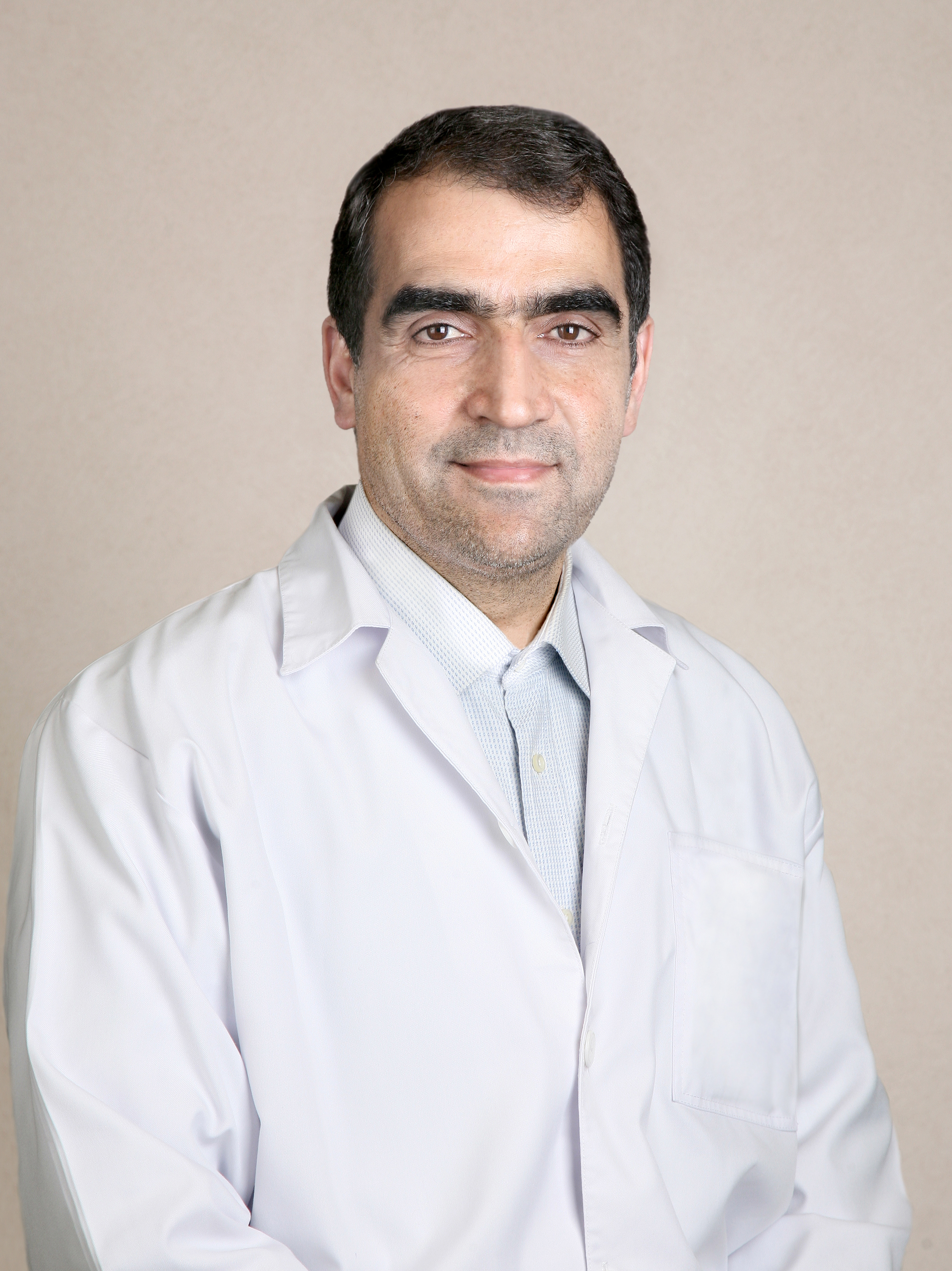
Ghazizadeh Hashemi in 2023

Seyed Hassan Ghazizadeh Hashemi (Persian: سید حسن قاضی‌زاده هاشمی; born 21 March 1959) is an ophthalmologist and full professor at Tehran University of Medical Sciences, as well as the head and founder of the Noor Ophthalmology Complex.

During his career, Hashemi has initiated the first Eye Cohort Study in the Middle East (Shahroud Eye Cohort Study – since 2008) and was one of the founders of Jihad Sazendagi (an organization established after Iran’s revolution to serve the rural residents and underserved regions). He has also established Nooravaran Salamat Charity Foundation (2001) which provides free general and specialty ophthalmic and dental services in remote underprivileged areas of Iran.

Hashemi was elected as the Minister of Health, Treatment, and Medical Education in 2012 and resigned from this position in January 2017. Among his numerous services, while in office, is developing the national Health Transformation Plan.

== Early life and education ==
Hashemi was born in March 1959 in Fariman (Khorasan Razavi Province), where he completed his primary education. He completed his secondary education at Danesh Bozorg-nia High School in Mashhad. He was accepted into medical school at Ferdowsi University in Mashhad after taking the national entrance exam of 1976 – 77. In 1989, he completed his residency training in ophthalmology at the same university, ranking first among his cohort, and in 1990, he completed his fellowship in Cornea and Anterior Segment at Shahid Beheshti University of Medical Sciences in Tehran. He has also completed numerous post-graduate training courses in North America and Europe on the latest methods of corneal surgery, cataract surgery, and correction of refractive errors.

- Ant segment and Cornea Fellowship, Shahid Beheshti University of Medical Sciences (1991)
- Ophthalmology, Mashhad University of Medical Sciences (1989)
- Medical Doctorate, Mashhad University of Medical Sciences (1985)

== Career ==
After graduation, Hashemi spent more than 30 years at Tehran University of Medical Sciences and Farabi Hospital. During his academic tenure, he has trained a large number of medical and allied health students, including more than 200 ophthalmologists and 50 anterior segment fellows. He has also organized numerous training courses for ophthalmologists in the past three decades.

In May 1992, he established Noor Eye Clinic (the very first private-sector ophthalmology clinic) in Motahari Street, Tehran. In 2006, he established Noor Eye Hospital on Esfandiar Boulevard, Tehran. Now, Noor Ophthalmology Complex comprises 2 hospitals, 4 clinics, and sub-specialty polyclinics in Iran and Oman, all of which are run under his close supervision.

== Banning from gaining temporary residency in Canada ==
Canadian federal government said it will deny former Iranian health minister Seyed Hassan Ghazizadeh Hashemi temporary residency following reports that he was spotted in Montreal in summer 2023.
