= Shahid Dastgheib Hospital =

Geography
- Location: Shiraz, Iran
- Coordinates: 29.624172°N 52.554738°E

Organisation
- Type: General

Services
- Emergency department: Yes

Links
- Lists: Hospitals in Iran

Shahid Dastgheib Hospital is a public hospital located in Shiraz, Iran and currently has a capacity of 130 beds.
