= DARU Journal of Pharmaceutical Sciences =

- Discipline: Pharmaceutical sciences
- Language: English
- Edited by: Mohammad Abdollahi

Publication details
- History: 1990–present
- Publisher: Springer Science+Business Media on behalf of Tehran University of Medical Sciences (Iran)
- Frequency: Monthly
- Open access: Hybrid
- Impact factor: 2.8 (2025)

Standard abbreviations
- ISO 4: DARU J. Pharm. Sci.

Indexing
- ISSN: 1560-8115 (print); 2008-2231 (web)
- OCLC no.: 61283828

Links
- Journal homepage

DARU Journal of Pharmaceutical Sciences is a hybrid open-access peer-reviewed medical journal that was established in 1990 in Iran. It covers all aspects of the pharmaceutical sciences. The editor-in-chief is Mohammad Abdollahi. From 2018 the journal is published by Springer Science+Business Media on behalf of Tehran University of Medical Sciences.

== History ==
The journal was established as a Persian language journal in 1990. English abstracts were included in 1995, and the language changed to English in 1999. In 2012, the journal moved to open access with BioMed Central, which lasted until 2017.

== Abstracting and indexing ==
The journal is indexed and abstracted in:

- Biological Abstracts
- BIOSIS
- CAB Abstracts
- Chemical Abstracts Service
- EBSCO databases
- Excerpta Medica/EMBASE
- Global Health
- Science Citation Index Expanded
- Scopus

According to the Journal Citation Reports, the journal has a 2025 impact factor of 2.8.

== Individual papers ==
In November 2025 Retraction Watch reported that the journal published a paper co-authored by the editor-in-chief that contained fabricated references, repetitive language and other characteristics of AI generated text. Springer Nature flagged the paper on unespecific concerns. In November 2026 Retraction Watch noted again that the paper was not updated.

== See also ==
- Health care in Iran
