= Baghiyyatollah al-Azam Military Hospital =

- Baqiyatallah University of Medical Sciences
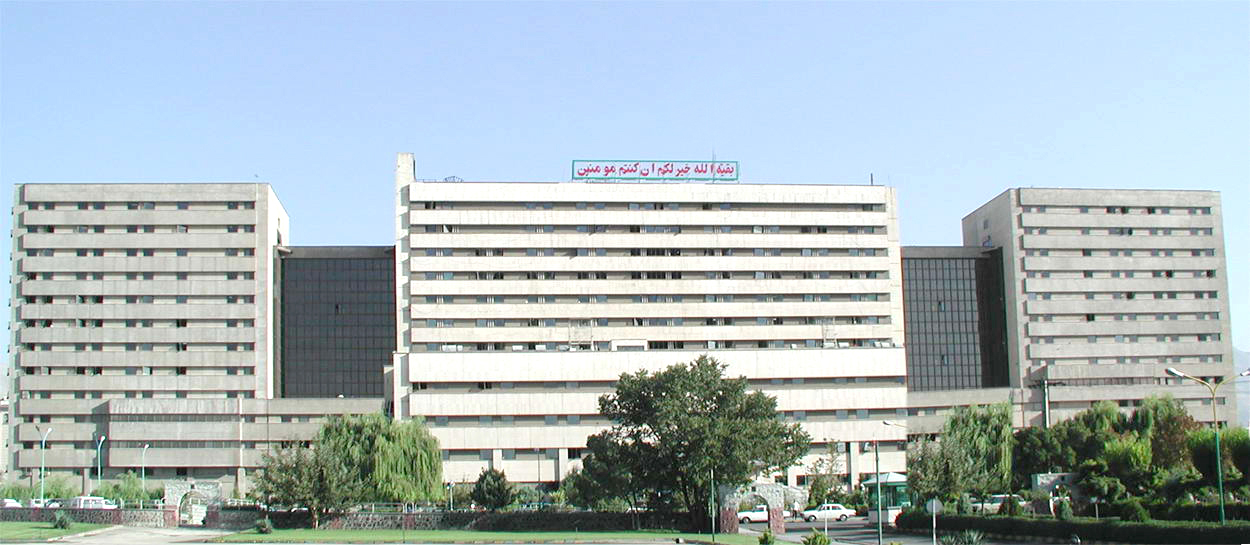

Geography
- Location: Mulla Sadra Street in Vanak, Tehran, Iran
- Coordinates: 35.756227°N 51.395138°E

Organisation
- Care system: Public
- Type: Military
- Affiliated university: Baqiyatallah University of Medical Sciences

Links
- Lists: Hospitals in Iran

The Baghiyyatollah al-Azam Military Hospital (Persian: بیمارستان بقیةالله) is a military hospital in Mulla Sadra Street in Vanak, Tehran, Iran. It is the biggest of the three hospitals affiliated with the Baqiyatallah University of Medical Sciences.
