= Mohammad-Reza Zarrindast =

Mohammad Reza Zarrindast is an Iranian pharmacologist and biomedical researcher. Zarrindast has published more than 200 research papers in peer-reviewed international journals. As of 2011 he was full professor of pharmacology at Tehran Medical School.

== See also ==
- Intellectual movements in Iran
- Iranian science
