= Sarem Hospital =

Geography
- Location: Tehran, Ekbatan, Iran
- Coordinates: 35.714895°N 51.310791°E

Organisation
- Care system: Private
- Type: Community, District General
- Patron: Aboutaleb Saremi

Services
- Emergency department: Yes
- Beds: 100

History
- Constructed: 1998
- Opened: 6 August 2006; 19 years ago

Links
- Website: saremhospital.org
- Lists: Hospitals in Iran

Sarem Hospital (Persian: بیمارستان صارم) is a private rural general hospital with a focus on gynecology and infertility. It is located in Ekbatan Town in the west of Tehran, Iran.

== History ==
The process of construction of the Sarem Hospital started in 1998 under the supervision of AboTaleb Saremi and the hospital officially began its services in 2006.

== Publications ==
Sarem Journal of Reproductive Medicine is published by the Sarem Cell Research Center (SCRC) and Sarem Fertility Research Center (SAFIR). Mashgh-e Tandorosti (Homework of Health) is published by the hospital for a general audience. Sarem also publishes an internal newspaper and a monthly journal.
