= Razavi Hospital =

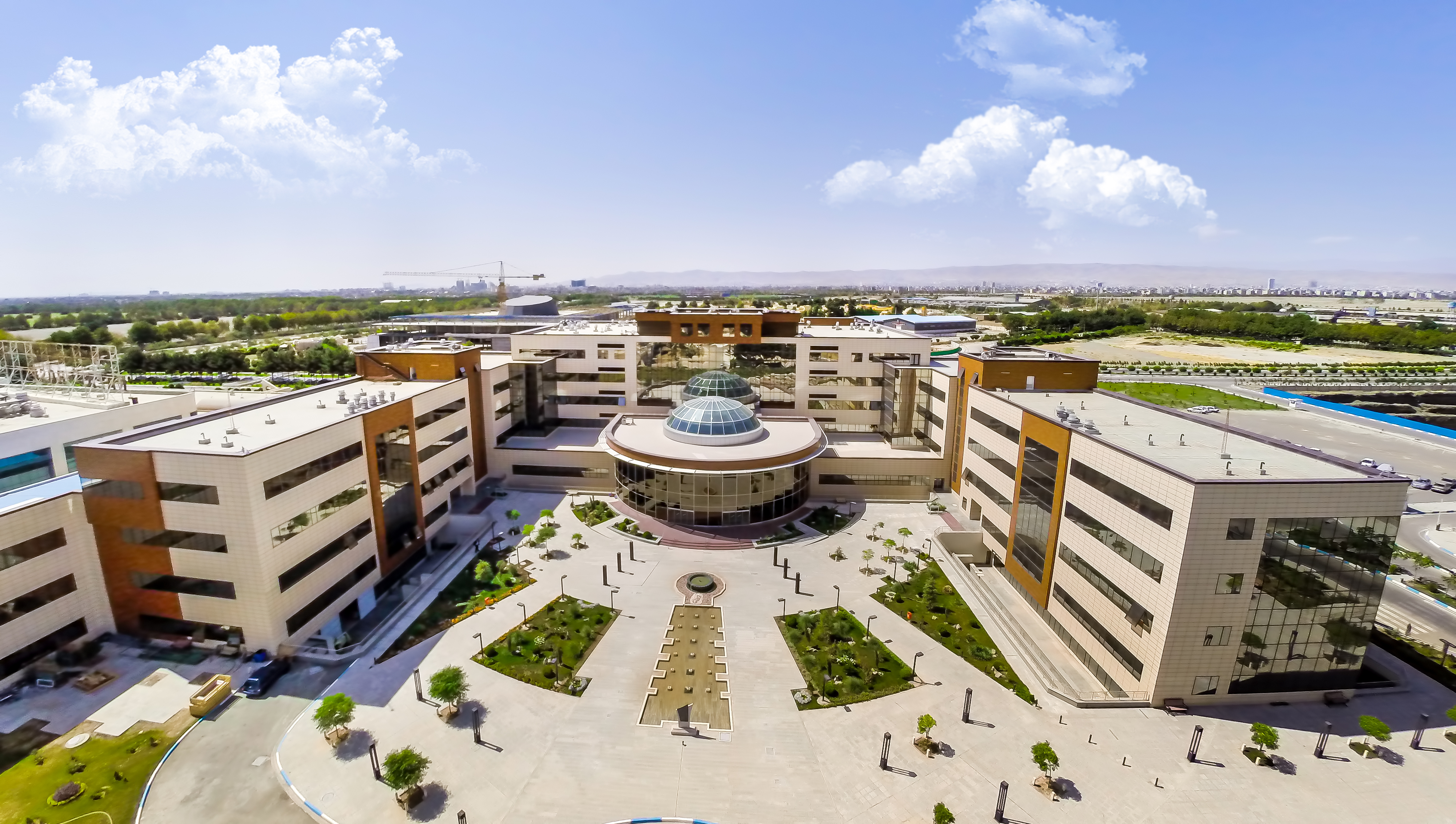
- Razavihospital

Geography
- Location: Mashhad, Iran
- Coordinates: 36°21′17.77″N 59°32′52.7″E

Organisation
- Type: General

Services
- Beds: more than 300

History
- Opened: 2005

Links
- Lists: Hospitals in Iran

The Razavi Hospital is situated between the Iranian cities of Mashhad and Toos. Established in 2005 the facility covers 56,000 square metres and caters for patients with a wide range of medical conditions.

== Services and awards ==
The Razavi Hospital is a Multi-specialty/Super-specialty Hospital with Cardiac Units, Cosmetic surgery wards, Radiology Departmentsand, Fertility clinics, Nuclear Medicine and Operation Theatres. The hospital has more than 300 beds after final development at 2013, after this development the hospital was accredited by Accreditation Canada International (ACI) for Quality Health Services to local and international patients and acquired multiple certificates.

== Education and research ==
The hospital involves in medical education programme and clinical research. The hospital hosts international congresses, symposiums and seminars in collaboration with international health organisations such as World Health Organization. Razavi Center of Cancer Researches began its activity with the presence of technology and research assistant of Health Ministry in February 2016.

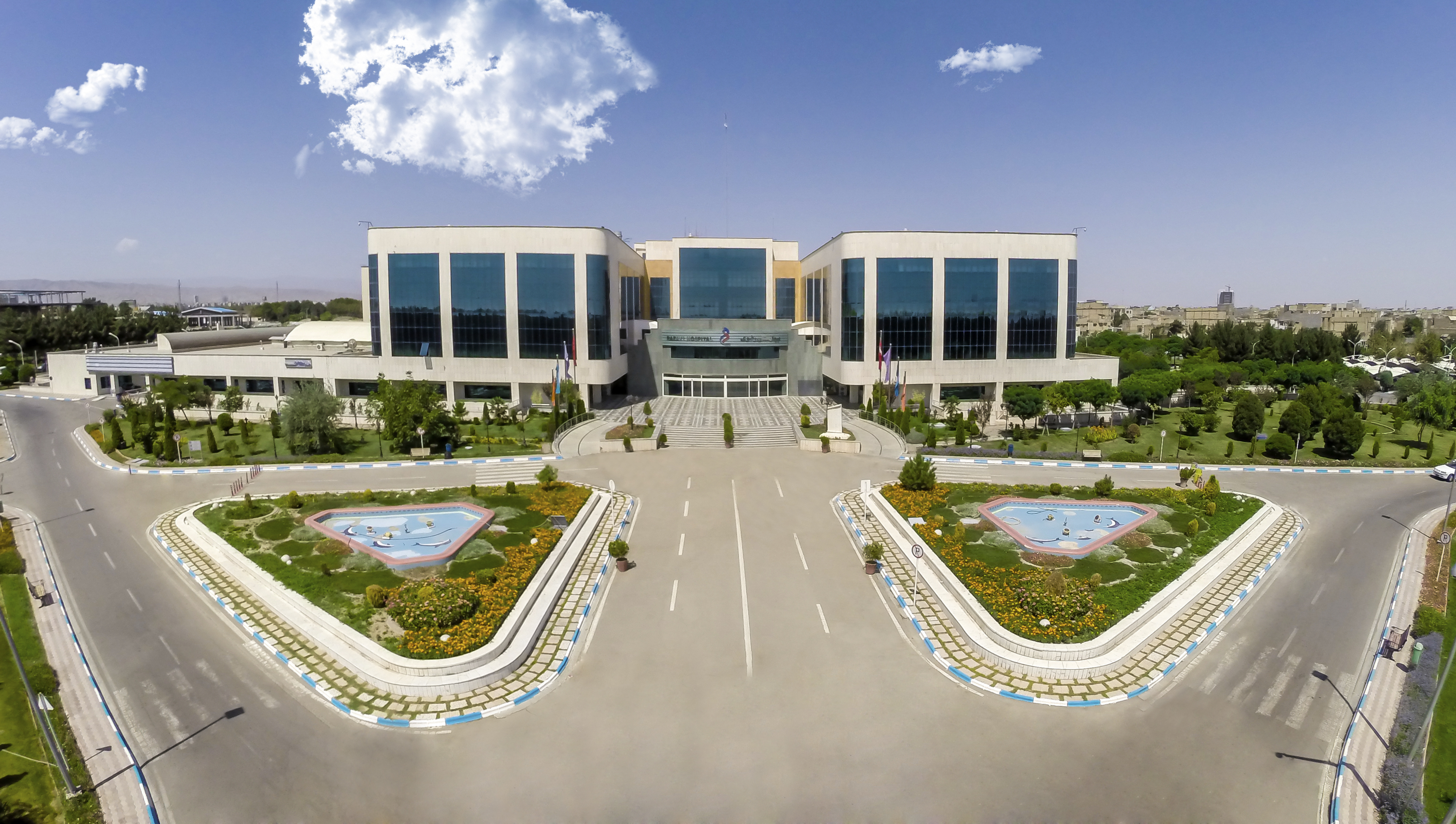
Rzavi Hospital rear view

== Mission ==
The Razavi Hospital in line with developing the cultural and social services of Astan-e Quds Razavi is providing appropriate medical services for Mashhad citizens and medical tourists).
