= Psychology and Counseling Organization of Iran =

Iranian non-governmental organization

- Psychology and Counseling Organization
- سازمان نظام روان‌شناسی و مشاوره
- Abbreviation: PCO
- Formation: 2003
- Type: NGO
- Legal status: professional association
- Location: Tehran, Iran
- Head: Alireza Agha-Yousefi
- Website: pcoiran.ir

The Psychology and Counseling Organization (PCO) is a non-governmental, independent Iranian organization formed to improve psychology and counseling knowledge, support the rights of clients to psychologists and counselors, and support the professional rights of psychologists and counselors. It is the leading authority within the country for issuing work permits for psychologists and counselors.

The organization's roles include issuing the system number and work license for the members of the organization (psychologists and counselors), monitoring the quality of professional work, proposing to determine or revise the tariffs for psychological and counseling services to the government board for approval, and publication of works and holding specialized conferences.

== Head ==
mohammad hatami is currently the head of the Organization. Before him, Abbas Ali Allahiari, Gholam Ali Afrooz, and Mohammad Hatami were the heads of this organization. The head of the organization is elected by the central council members and introduced to the Iranian president. Then the head of the organization is appointed by the president by submitting a decree to the Organization.
