= Arad General Hospital =

Hospital in Tehran, Iran

Geography
- Location: Tehran, Iran
- Coordinates: 35°42′20.2″N 51°25′47.6″E

Organisation
- Care system: Private
- Type: Community

Services
- Emergency department: Yes
- Beds: 150

History
- Founded: 1976

Links
- Website: arad-hospital.com
- Lists: Hospitals in Iran

The Arad Hospital of Tehran or the Arad Hospital (Persian: بیمارستان آراد تهران) is a private rural general hospital, It was founded in 1976, in the center of Tehran, Iran. It has 150 beds in 5 floors with more than 45 intensive care beds (general ICU (10), SICU (10), RICU (10), MICU (10) and CCU (10)). The hospital is fully equipped with all types of specialities and subspecialties. Arad Hospital is run by 120 staff personnel in various fields of medicine. The hospital's stated purpose is "to continue to build on the best of the distinguished tradition of the past to meet the ever-changing patterns of medical care in future."

== Medical services ==
- Accident and Emergency
  - Hematology and Oncology
  - Cardiology
  - Gastroenterology
  - Pulmonary Medicine
  - Infectious Diseases
  - Endocrinology
  - Nephrology
  - Neurology
  - Psychiatry
  - Pituitary Clinic
  - Pediatrics
- General Surgery
- Neurosurgery
- Thoracic Surgery
- Obstetrics and Gynecology
- Orthopedics
- Plastic and Prosthesis
- Urology
- Otorhinolaryngology (ETN)
- Spinal Column
- Ophthalmology
- Laparoscopic
- Vascular Diseases
