= List of hospitals in Iran =

This is a list of hospitals in Iran.

== Bushehr ==
- Navid Hospital
- Hospital Bentolhoda
- Persian Gulf Hospital
- Bushehr Heart Hospital
- Khatam-ol-anbiya Hospital

== East Azarbaijan ==
- Amiralmo'menin
- Sina
- Emam Khomeyni
- Shohada
- Ali-Nasab
- Asad-Abadi
- Mahallati
- Behboud
- Hakima Noor
- Alavi
- Nikookari
- Shams
- Madani
- Fajr
- 522 Artesh
- 7 Tir
- Shahid Beheshti (Maragheh)
- Amiralmomenin (Maragheh)
- Sina (Maragheh)
- Hakim Jorjani

== Shiraz ==
- Namazi Hospital
- Poostchi Eye Hospital
- Khalily Eye Hospital
- Saadi
- Shahid Beheshti Hospital of Shiraz, previously called “Shiraz”
- Hafez
- Dena
- Chamran
- MRI
- Ordibehesht
- Shiraz is now called “Shahid Beheshti”
- Shahid Dastgheib Hospital
- Pars
- Kosar
- Shahr
- Army 576
- Kasra is closed
- Zeynabeyeh Women Hospital
- Boo Ali Sina Hospital (Shiraz Sadra)
- Ghotb-e-Din
- Moslemin
- Mental Hospital
- Madar va Koodak (Ghadir)
- Rajaii (Trauma)
- Shafa
- Be'sat
- Bimarestan-e Saratan-e Jonub-e Keshvar

== Ilam Province ==
- Kousar General Hospital
- Qaem Hospital
- Tamin Ejtemayi Hospital
- Imam Khomeini Hospital
- Taleghani Hospital
- Mostafa Khomeini Hospital

== Isfahan Province ==
- Persian Eye Clinic
- Amir-al-momenin
- Hojjatiyeh
- Isa bn-e Maryam
- Dr. Shariati Hospital
- Ayatollah Kashani
- Zahra-ye Zeinabiyeh
- Farabi
- Sina Hospital and Heart Center
- Amin
- Hazrat-e Sayyed-osh-shohada
- Saadi
- Sepahan
- Mehregan
- Imam Khomeini
- Jorjani
- Noor & Ali Asghar
- Shahid Chamran
- Shahid Modarres
- Kashani
- Isfahan Clinic
- Al-Zahra
- Imam Mousa Kazem
- Shahid Beheshti
- Feiz
- Shahid Sadughi

== Kerman Province ==
- Razieh Firouz
- Javad-ol-a'emmeh
- Fatemieh
- Samen-ol-a'emmeh
- Sajjadieh
- Shafa
- Shahid Bahonar
- Nouriyeh Kerman
- Mehregan
- Arjmand
- Afzalipour
- Hazrat-e Fatemeh
- Kashani
- Gol Gohar

== Kermanshah ==
- Bistoon Private Hospital
- Emam Hoseyn
- Emam Khomeyni
- Emam Reza new 515-bed hospital
- Farabi
- Mahdieh
- Motazedi
- Sajad (Aria)
- Sina
- Taleqani

== Khorasan Razavi ==
- Ali Ebne Abi Taleb
- Aria
- Artesh
- Bentolhoda
- Emam Hadi
- Emam Javad
- Emam Reza
- Emam Sadegh
- Emam Sajad
- Emam Zaman
- Fatemieh
- Ghamar Bani Hashem
- Ghaem
- Hashemi Nezhad
- Hazrate Abolfazl
- Hazrate Zeinab
- Hefdaheh Shahrivar
- Javadolaemeh
- Madar
- Mehr
- Mousabne Jafar
- Omid
- Pasteur
- Razi
- Razavi Hospital
- Shafa
- Shahid Gandhi
- Shahinfar
- Sherkat Naft
- Sina Hospital Mashhad
- Taleghani
- Ommolbanin

== Khuzestan ==
- Ahvaz Imam Khomeini hospital
- Ahvaz Abuzar Hospital
- Ahvaz Razi hospital
- Ahvaz Golestan Hospital
- Ahvaz Shafa Hospital
- Ahvaz Sinai Hospital
- Ahvaz Salamat hospital
- Ahvaz Oil hospital
- Ahvaz Apadana Hospitals
- Ahvaz Aria Hospital
- Ahvaz Arvand hospital
- Ahvaz Mehr Hospital
- Ahvaz Karami Hospital
- Ahvaz Boustan Hospital
- Ahvaz Fatemeh Alzahra Hospital
- Ahvaz AmirAl Momenin hospital
- Ahvaz Amir Kabir hospital
- Ahvaz Rajai Hospital
- Ahvaz 578 Military Hospital
- Ahvaz Taleghani hospital
- Ahvaz Baghaie Hospital
- Hendijan Shohada Hospital
- Abadan Imam Khomeini Hospital
- Abadan Taleghani Hospital
- Abadan Beheshti Hospital
- Abadan 17 Shahrivar Hospital
- Shoshtar Alhadi Hospital
- Shoshtar Khatam Al-Anbiya Hospital
- Dezful Ganjavyan Hospital
- Dezful Nabavi Hospital
- Dezful Ya Zahra hospital
- Dezful Afshar Hospital
- Dezful Paygah 4 Shekary Hospital
- Bandar Imam Khomeini Rah-Zainab Hospital
- Omideh Imam Reza hospital
- Omideh Iranpour Hospital
- Niyaki martyr army hospital

== Markazi ==
- Amir Kabir
- Ayatollah Khansari
- Ghods
- Madaen
- Vali-Asr
- Rah-ahan

== Mazandaran ==
- Imam Ali (Amol)
- Imam Reza (Amol)
- Shomal (Amol)
- Rouhani (Babol)
- Nimeh Shaban Hospital (Sari)
- Bu Ali Hospital (Sari)
- Imam Hospital (Sari)
- Zare'ee Hospital (Sari)
- Doctor Omidi Hospital (Behshahr)
- Amir Mazandarani Hospital (Sari)
- Hekmat Hospital (Sari)
- Ayatollah Taleghani (Chaloos)

== Qazvin ==
- Pars Surgical centre for Plastic, reconstructive and other surgeries; Padegan St.
- Shahid Rajaee hospital, Affiliated to Qazvin University of Medical Sciences, QUMS
- Pastour Hospital
- Velayat Hospital
- Mehregan Hospital
- Dehkhoda Hospital
- Booali Hospital

== Qom ==
- Kamka-Arabnia
- Hazrate Fateme Masomeh
- Beheshti University Hospital
- Nekoee-Hedayati
- Izadi
- Alzahra
- Gholpayeghani
- Valiasr
- Aliebnabitaleb

== Semnan ==
- Ayatollah Shahroudi low population

== Sistan and Baluchestan ==
- Ali Ebn Abitaleb (Zahedan)
- Khatam (Zahedan)
- Social security (Zahedan)
- Razi (saravan)
- Farhangian

== Tehran Province ==
- 22nd of Bahman
- 502 Artesh
- 503 Artesh
- 504 Artesh
- 505 Artesh
- 506 Artesh
- Abu Ali Sina Hospital
- Akhtar Hospital
- Alghadir Hospital
- Ali Asghar Hospital
- Alvand Hospital
- Amir Aalam Hospital
- Amir Almoamenin Hospital
- Andarzgo Hospital
- Apadana Hospital
- Arad General Hospital
- Arash Hospital
- Asia Hospital
- Atieh Hospital
- Ayatollah Kashani Hospital
- Ayatollah Khansari
- Ayatollah Taleghani Hospital
- Azadi Psychiatric Hospital
- Baghiyyatollah al-Azam Military Hospital
- Baharlo
- Baher Hospital
- Bahman Hospital
- Bahrami Hospital
- Bank Melli Iran's Hospital
- Beasat Hospital
- Boali Hospital
- Bozorgmehr Hospital
- Chehrazy Hospital
- Cheshm Pezeshkieh Payambaran (Ophthalmology Clinic)
- Children Medical Center
- Dadgostari Hospital
- Dey Hospital
- Dr Maseeh Daneshvari Hospital
- Dr. Sapir Hospital and Charity Center
- Emam Hosein Hospital
- Ebnesina Hospital
- Erfan Hospital
- Esmaili (Psychiatric)
- Eyvaz Zadeh Hospital
- Fajr Hospital
- Farabi Hospital (Ophthalmology)
- Farabi Jadid
- Fayazbakhsh Hospital
- Firoozabadi Hospital
- Ghiyasi Hospital
- Hashemi Nejad Hospital
- Hazrate Fatemeh Zahra Hospital
- Hazrate Mohammad Hospital
- Hefdah-e-Shahrivar Hospital
- Hoseyniyeh Ershad Hospital
- Imam Khomeini Hospital Complex
- Imam Hossein Hospital
- Iran Hospital
- Iranmehr Hospital
- Jamaran (Cardiology)
- Jam Hospital
- Javahery Hospital
- Jorjani Hospital
- Kasra Hospital
- Khanevadeh Hospital (Artesh)
- Khatam ol-Anbia Hospital
- Kyan Hospital (Kyan General Hospital)
- Kourosh Heart Center
- Laleh Hospital
- Labbafinejad Medical Center
- Loghman-o-Doleh Hakim Hospital (Includes a poison center)
- Lolagar Hospital
- Madaen Hospital
- Madar Hospital
- Madaran Hospital
- Mahak Hospital
- Mahdieh Hospital
- Mardom Hospital
- Marghad Shahr
- Markaze Ghalbe Tehran (Cardiology)
- Marvasti Hospital
- Mehrad Hospital
- Meymanat Hospital
- Milad Hospital
- Shahid Modarres Hospital
- Sina Hospital, Iran
- Mofarah Hospital
- Mofid Hospital
- Moghoufeh Nouh Hospital
- Moheb Hospitals
- Najmiyeh Hospital
- Nasr Hospital
- Negah Eye Hospital
- Nirooye Entezami No.2 Hospital
- Nirooye Entezami No.1 Hospital
- Nirooye Daryayi Hospital
- Nirooye Havaei Hospital
- No.5 Shahid Fayyazbakhsh Hospital
- Noor Afshar Hospital
- Noor Saadat Hospital
- Noor Eye Hospital
- Omid Hospital
- Panzdah-e-Khordad Hospital
- Pars Hospital
- Park Clinic
- Parsian Hospital
- Pasargad Hospital
- Payambaran Hospital
- Rajayi Hospital
- Ramtin Cardio-Vascular Research and Treatment Center
- Razi (Razani) Hospital
- Razi Hospital
- Resalat Hospital
- Rezaei (Neuropsychology)
- Roien Tan Arash Hospital
- Roozbeh Hospital
- Sarem Women Hospital
- Sajjad Hospital
- Sevom Shaban Hospital
- Seyedolshohada Hospital
- Shafa Yahyaian Hospital
- Shahid Andarzgou Hospital
- Shahid Ashrafi Esfahani Hospital
- Shahid Dr Chamran Hospital
- Shahid Dr Lavasani
- Shahid Fahmideh
- Shahid Mottahari (Burns Center)
- Shahid Rajayi
- Shahid Shariat Razavi
- Shahriar Hospital
- Shariati Hospital
- Sherkat Naft Hospital
- Shohaday Yaft Abad
- Shohadaye Hafte Tir
- Shohadaye Larzan
- Shohadaye Tajrish Hospital
- Sina Hospital
- Takhti (Children)
- Tavanbakhshi-e Malolin-e Zehni (Vezarat Kar and Omur Ejtemai)
- Tehran Clinic Hospital
- Tehran Pars
- Torfeh Hospital
- Tus Hospital
- Toos General Hospital
- Valiasr Hospital
- Vasei Hospital
- Yaser Hospital
- Zayeshgah e Babak (Maternity Unit)
- Zayeshgah e Amin Sadeghiyeh (Maternity Unit)
- Zayeshgah-e-Eghbal (Obstetric)
- Ziaeian

== West Azarbaijan ==
- Ayatollah Khoyi
- IMAM REZA
- AZERBAIJAN
- MOTAHARI
- SHAHID AREFIYAN
- IMAM KHOMEYNI

== Yazd ==
- Mortaz General Hospital
- Syedolshohada
- Goudarz Hospital
- Ardakan Charity
- Hazrate Mahdi
- Ayatollah Mousavi
- Shahid Sadoughi University of Medical Sciences

== Zanjan ==
- Vali-e Asr
- Shahid Beheshti
- Shafiiyeh
- Ayatollah Mousavi Hospital

== Golestan ==
- Alejalil Hospital
- Beski Hospital
- Dezyani Hospital
- Sayad Shirazi Hospital
- 5th Azar Hospital
