= Roozbeh Hospital =

Geography
- Location: Tehran, Iran
- Coordinates: 35.679426°N 51.393813°E

Organisation
- Type: Psychiatric

Links
- Lists: Hospitals in Iran

Roozbeh Hospital (Persian: بیمارستان روزبه) is the oldest psychiatric hospital in Iran, which is a subset of Tehran University of Medical Sciences.
