= Imam Khomeini Hospital Complex =

Hospital complex in Tehran, Iran

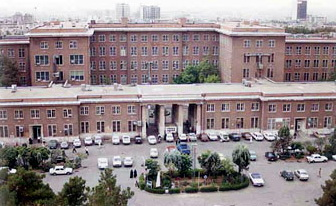
- Imam Khomeini Hospital

Geography
- Location: Tehran, Iran
- Coordinates: 35°42′28″N 51°22′50″E

Organisation
- Type: Teaching
- Affiliated university: Tehran University of Medical Sciences

Services
- Beds: 1300

History
- Former names: Reza Pahlavi Hospital Center; Hezar Takhtkhabi Hospital Center
- Opened: 1941

Imam Khomeini Hospital Complex (Persian: مجتمع بیمارستانی امام خمینی) or also Reza Pahlavi Hospital Center is a teaching hospital complex and biomedical research facility of Tehran University of Medical Sciences, located in Tehran, Iran; Reza Pahlavi Hospital Center was built by the order of Reza Shah.

== History ==
A reputed German company took the responsibility of building the hospital being composed of the present Imam Khomeini Hospital, infections diseases ward and that of the Cancer Institute from 1938 to 1941. Before the Iranian Revolution it was called the "1000 beds hospital" that biggest hospital in Iran.

== Structure ==
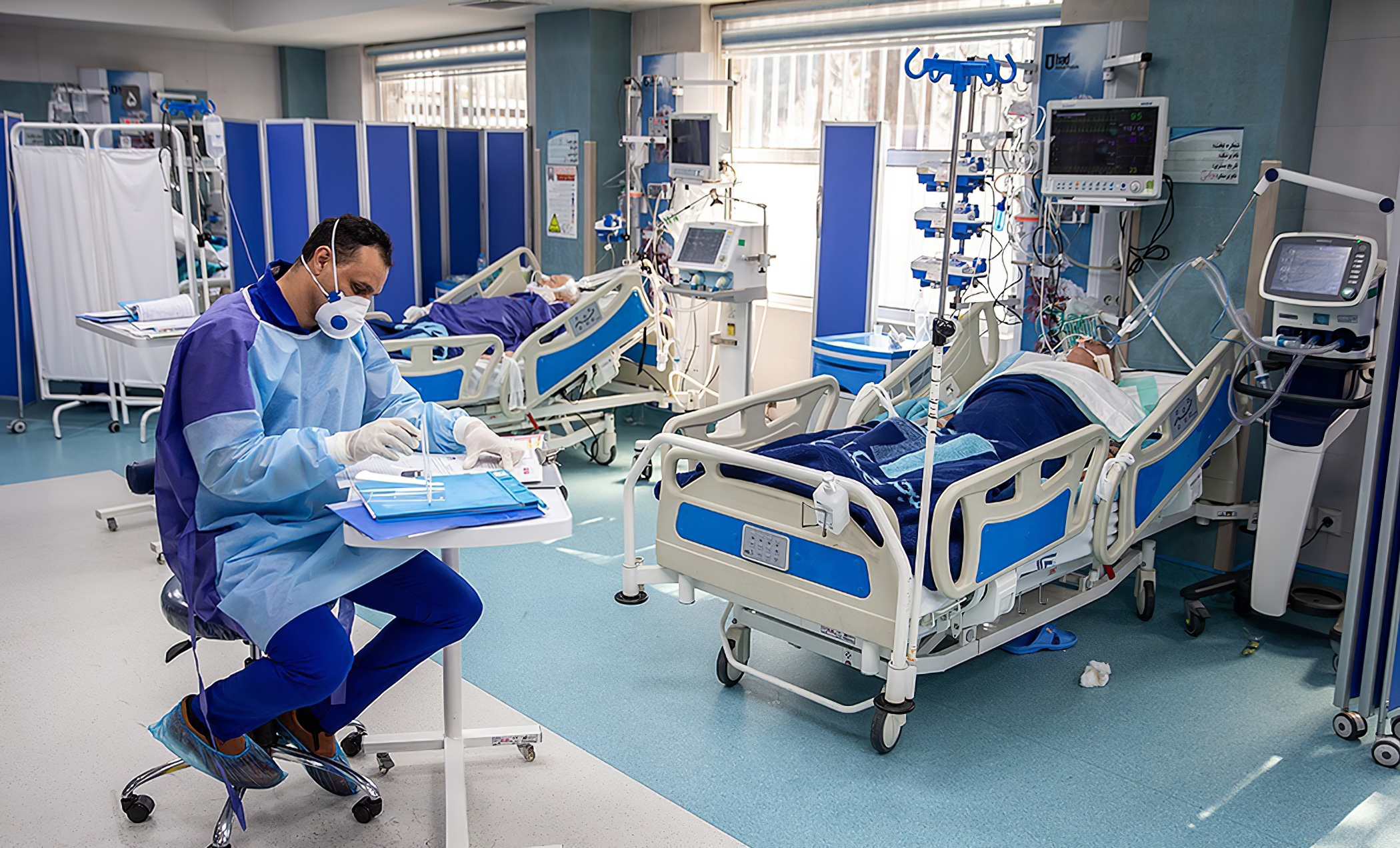
Physicians give treatment in the COVID-19 pandemic in Iran

It is including Imam Khomeini Hospital and Vali-Asr Hospital and Cancer Institute. This complex hospital presently has 242 faculty members, 4000 administrative and clinical staff, 1300 active beds.
