= Tehran University of Medical Sciences =

University in Tehran, Iran

- دانشگاه علوم پزشکی تهران
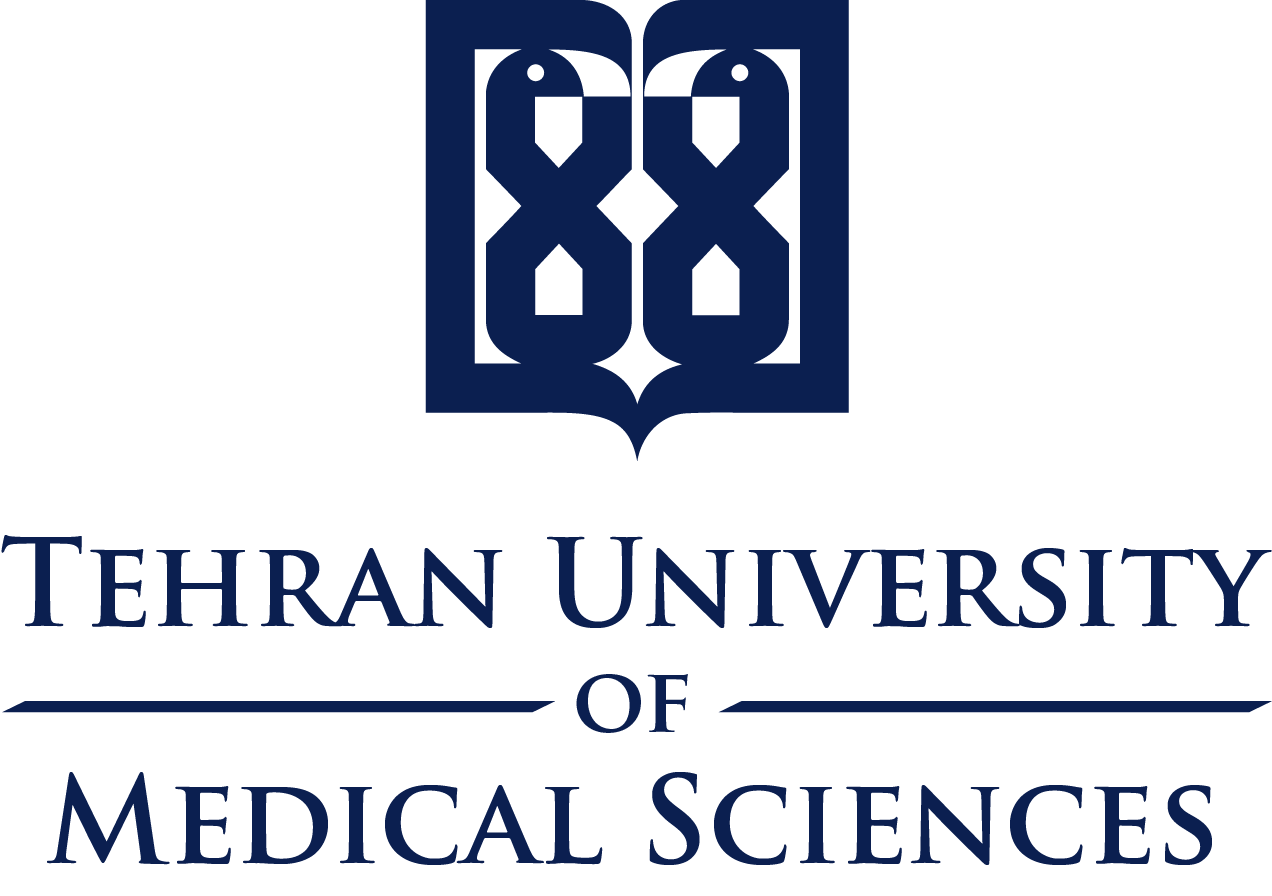
- Former names: Dar ul-Funun, University of Tehran Faculty of Medicine
- Motto: مراقبت از نسل جدید (Persian)
- Motto in English: Caring for a New Generation
- Type: Public
- Established: 1851 (as Dar ol-Fonoon)
- Founder: Amir Kabir
- Accreditation: IRI Medical Education Council, MOHME
- President: Seyed Reza Raeeskarami
- Academic staff: 1815
- Students: 11,543
- Location: Tehran, Iran; 35.706°N 51.394°E
- Campus: 55 acres; Urban
- Language: English, Persian
- Newspaper: SinaMedia (سینا رسانه)
- Colors
- Mascot: Ibn Sina
- Website: en.tums.ac.ir/en tums.ac.ir
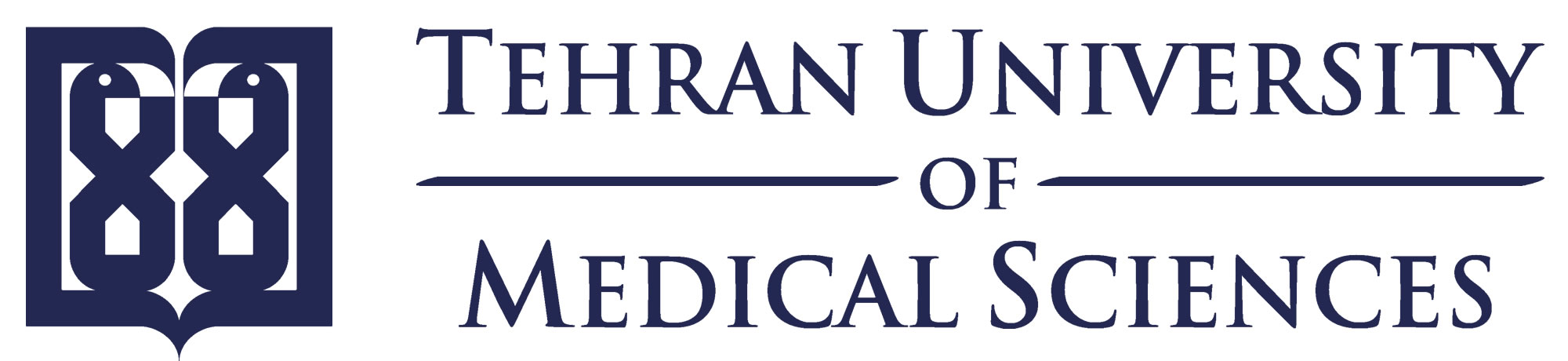

Tehran University of Medical Sciences (TUMS) (Persian: دانشگاه علوم پزشکی تهران, Daneshgah-e Olum Pezeshki-ye Tehran) is a public medical university in Tehran, Iran.

Located in Tehran, adjacent to the main University ran campus, it was founded as part of Dar al-Fonun in 1851, and absorbed into the University of Tehran in 1934. It finally separated from the University of Tehran by parliamentary legislation in 1986, coming under the new Ministry of Health, Treatment, and Medical Education.

The university operates The National Museum of Medical Sciences History as well. TUMS is accredited with Premier Status by the Accreditation Service for International Colleges and Universities (ASIC UK).

== Schools ==
Tehran University of Medical Sciences includes 10 different Schools (11 with Virtual School) which deal with various academical studies related to medical sciences.

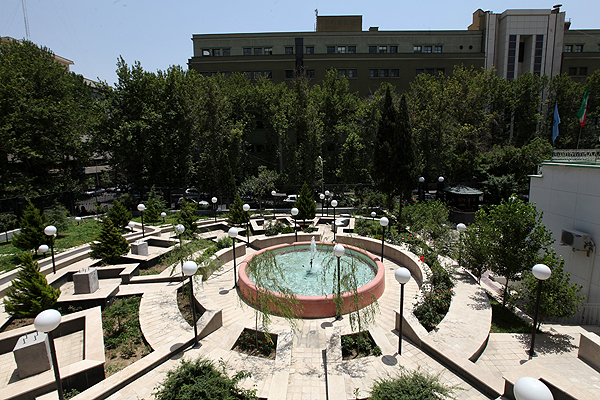

== Pharmacies ==
1. Taleghani
2. Shahid Abedini
3. Dr. Amini
4. BooAli
5. Isar
6. 13 aban
7. Sina
8. Imam Khomeini hospital
9. Dr. Shari'ati hospital
10. Razi hospital
11. Children Hospital
12. Subspecialty of 13 Aban

== Research centers ==
13 research institutes with over 100 research centers are in charge of Tehran University of Medical Science research affairs.

- Endocrinology and Metabolism Research Institute
  - Endocrinology and Metabolism Molecular-Cellular Sciences Institute
  - Endocrinology and Metabolism Clinical Sciences Institute
  - Endocrinology and Metabolism Population Sciences Institute
- The Institute of Pharmaceutical Sciences (TIPS)
- Neuroscience Institute
- Digestive Diseases Research Institute
- Cardiovascular Diseases Research Institute
- Iranian Institute for reduction of High-Risk Behaviors
- Institute for Environmental Research
- Advanced Medical Technologies and Equipment Institute
- Cancer Research Institute
- Dental Research Institute
- Family Health Research Institute

== Rankings ==
University rankings

Global – Overall
- ARWU World: 401-500 (2025)
- THE Worldhttps://www.timeshighereducation.com/world-university-rankings/latest/world-ranking: 501-600 (2026)
- USNWR Global: 588

International ranking of Tehran University of Medical Sciences in recent years is as follows:

- U.S. News & World Report
  - 2025: Global: 588
- QS World University Rankings
  - 2025: Medicine: 251–300
    - Nursing: 151–225
    - Pharmacy & Pharmacology: 201–250
    - Life Sciences and Medicine: =309
- Academic Ranking of World Universities (ARWU/Shanghai Ranking)>
  - 2025: International rank : 401–500
  - Pharmacy: 51–75
  - Food Science & Technology: 101–150
  - Public Health: 101–150
  - Dentistry: 151–200
  - Nursing: 201–300
  - Clinical Medicine: 201–300
  - Environmental & Engineering: 401–500

== Notable alumni ==
Notable graduates of Tehran University of Medical Sciences are:

- Mohammad Gharib, father of Iranian pediatrics
- Moslem Bahadori, pathologist
- Minoo Mohraz, AIDS specialist
- Abbas Shafiee, pharmaceutical chemist
- Mohammad-Reza Zarrindast
- Ahmad Reza Dehpour
- Fereydoun Davatchi
- Alireza Mashaghi, physician-scientist, pioneer of dual-degree/parallel education
- Reza Malekzadeh, gastroenterologist
- Parviz Kambin, pioneer of minimally invasive spinal surgery

== Gallery ==
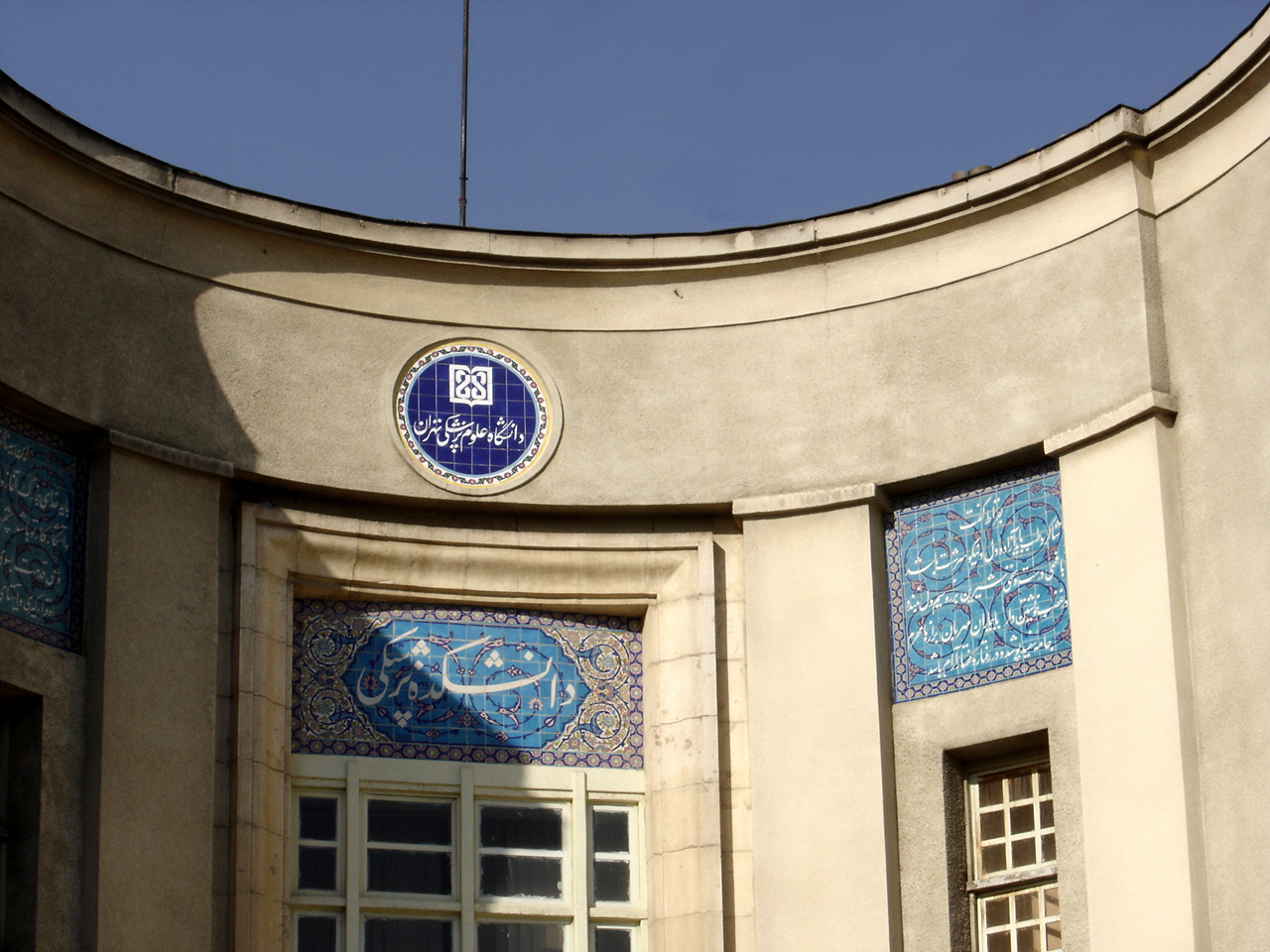
Faculty of medicine

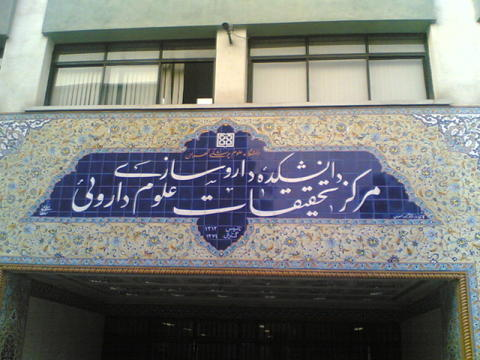
Faculty of pharmacy

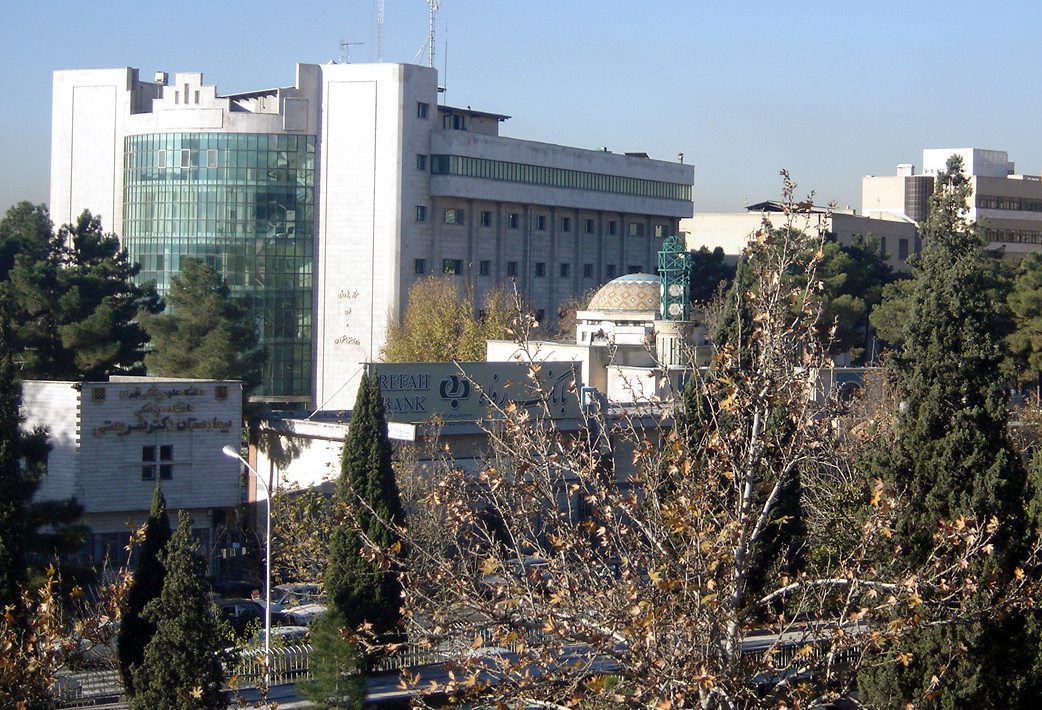
Hematology-Oncology and Stem Cell Transplantation Research Center (HORCSCT)

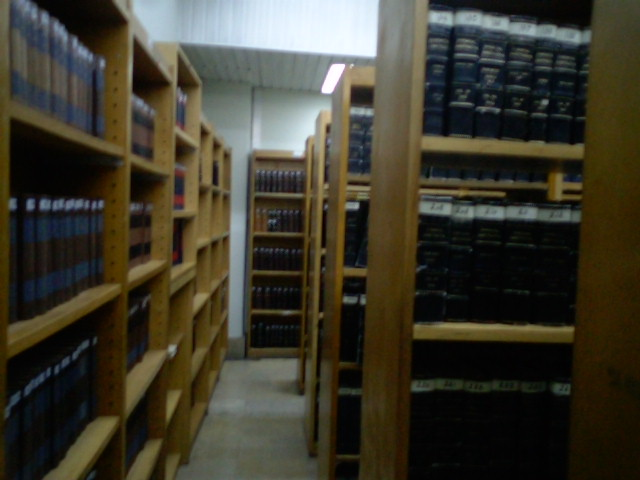
Chemical abstract library of pharmacy faculty

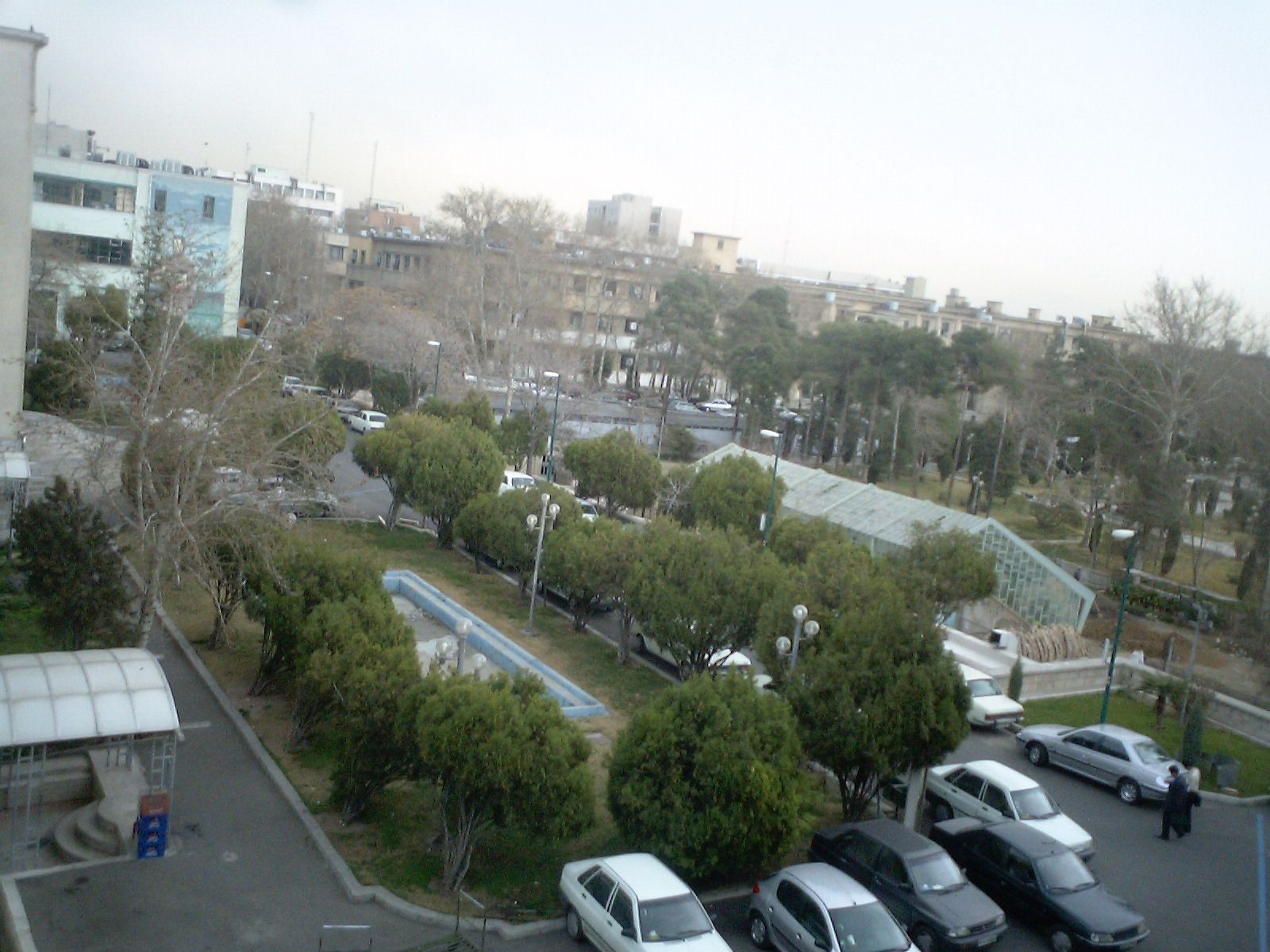
A view of the university's main campus (Winter)

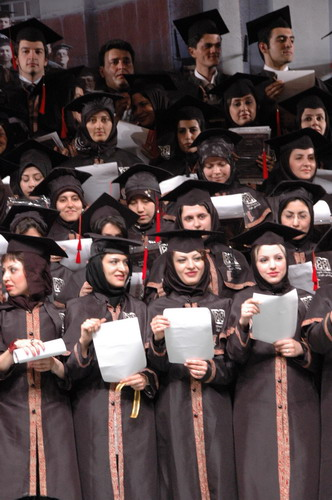
Graduation ceremony

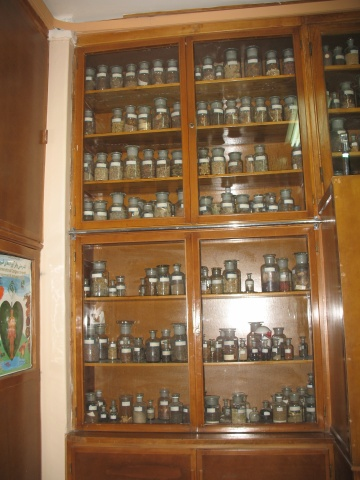
Collection of Iranian traditional medicinal plants in pharmacy faculty

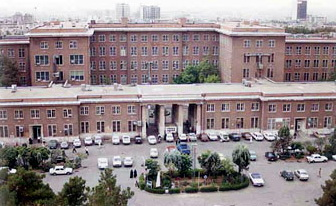
Imam Khomeini hospital

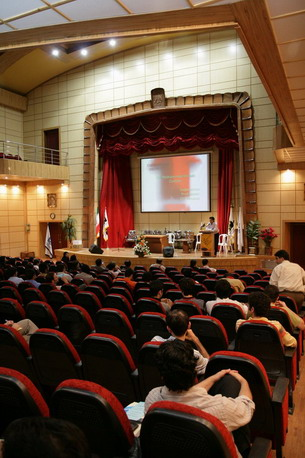
Exceptional talents ceremony

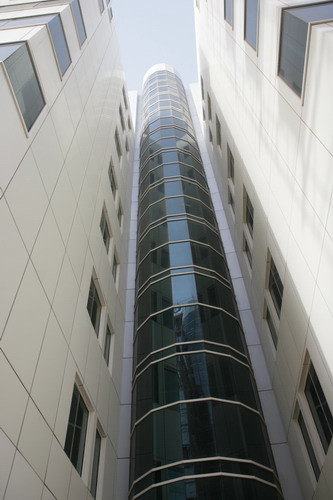
Sara hostel in Kish Island

== See also ==
- List of Islamic educational institutions
- Healthcare in Iran
- Daru-Journal of Faculty of Pharmacy
- Higher education in Iran
- List of hospitals in Iran
- List of Tehran University people
