= Sattar Mahmoudi =

Iranian engineer and politician

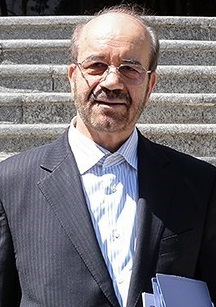

Minister of Energy Acting
- In office 20 August 2017 – 29 October 2017
- President: Hassan Rouhani
- Preceded by: Hamid Chitchian
- Succeeded by: Reza Ardakanian

Personal details
- Education: Sharif University; Isfahan University

Sattar Mahmoudi (Persian: ستار محمودی) is an Iranian engineer, politician and former acting Minister of Energy of Iran, a position he has held, from 20 August 2017 until 29 October 2017. He is also Vice Minister of Energy, a position he has held since 2014.
