= Dowlatabad, Dehaqan =

Neighborhood in Isfahan province, Iran

Dowlatabad Persian: دولت اباد
- Neighborhood
- Location within Iran
- Coordinates: 31°55′22″N 51°45′39″E
- Country: Iran
- Province: Isfahan
- County: Dehaqan
- District: Central
- City: Golshan

Population (2006)
  - Total: 909
- Time zone: UTC+3:30 (IRST)

Dowlatabad (Persian: دولت اباد) (Note: Also romanized as Dowlatābād) is a neighborhood in the city of Golshan in the Central District of Dehaqan County, (Note: Formerly Semirom-e Sofla County) Isfahan province, Iran.

== Demographics ==
=== Population ===
At the time of the 2006 National Census, Dowlatabad's population was 909 in 217 households, when it was a village in Musaabad Rural District.

In 2010, the village of Musaabad was converted to a city and renamed Golshan after merging with the villages of Dowlatabad and Mehdiabad.
