= Mousa Refan =

Iranian electrical engineer and military officer

Sardar Mousa Refan
- موسی رفان

Deputy Ministry of Energy and Deputy Minister of Energy for Industry and Support
- In office 1997–1998
- President: Akbar Hashemi Rafsanjani; Mohammad Khatami
- Supreme Leader: Ali Khamenei
- Preceded by: Majid Ghassemi
- Succeeded by: Reza Ardakanian

CEO of MAPNA Group
- In office 1993–2009
- Preceded by: Office Established
- Succeeded by: Abbas Aliabadi

CEO of IWPCO
- In office 1990–1993
- Preceded by: Behrouz Khajavi Noori
- Succeeded by: Reza Hadadian

1st Commander of the IRGC Aerospace Force
- In office 17 September 1985 – 24 April 1990
- President: Ali Khamenei; Akbar Hashemi Rafsanjani
- Prime Minister: Mir-Hossein Mousavi
- Supreme Leader: Ruhollah Khomeini; Ali Khamenei
- Preceded by: Office Established
- Succeeded by: Hossein Dehghan

Personal details
- Born: 22 May 1958 (age 68) Kazerun, Fars province, Pahlavi Iran

Military service
- Allegiance: Iran
- Branch/service: Islamic Revolutionary Guard Corps
- Years of service: 1981–1990
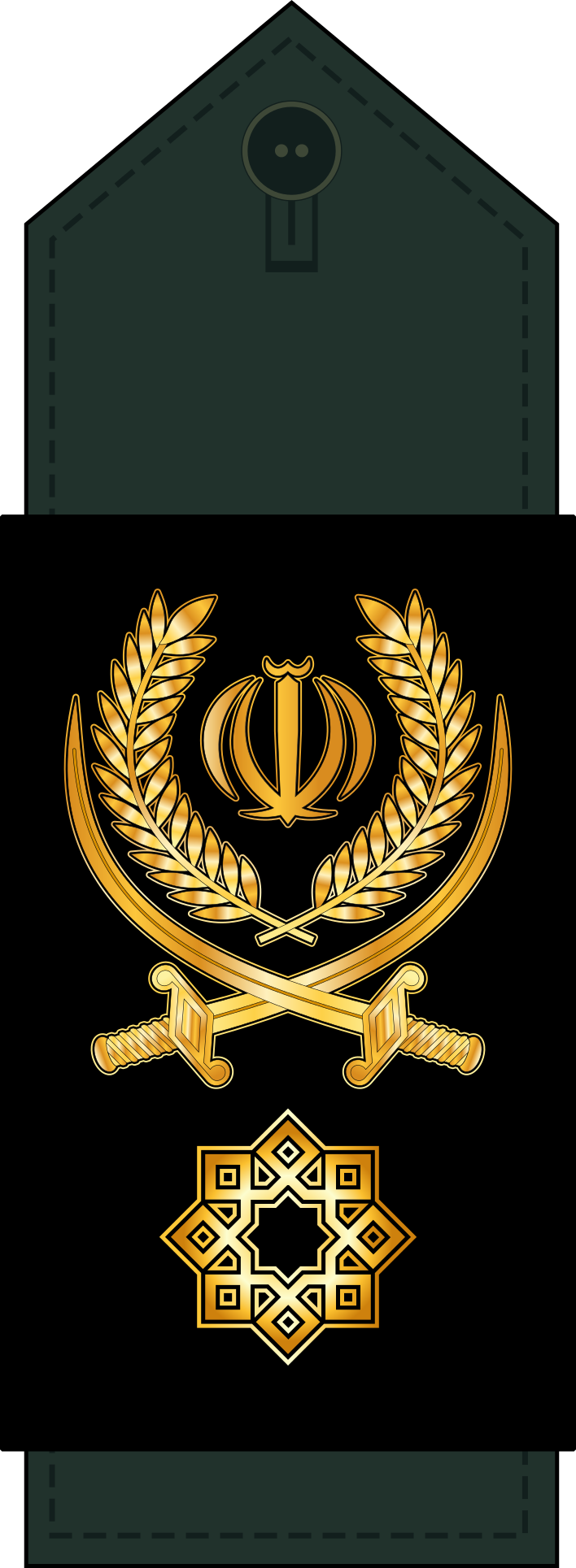
- Rank: Brigadier General
- Battles/wars: Iran–Iraq War

Mousa Refan (Persian: موسی رفان) also known as Akbar Refan (Persian: اکبر رفان), is an Iranian electrical engineer and former military officer.

In 2012 he was elected as the featured electrical engineer of Iran by Iran Academy of Science.

== Early life and education ==
Born in 1958 in Kazerun, Fars province, Refan obtained his BS in electrical engineering from University of Tehran.

== Military career ==
Refan was one of the Muslim Student Followers of the Imam's Line taking over the U.S. embassy in 1979, who entered Islamic Revolutionary Guard Corps (IRGC) and reached at top of its command hierarchy. He was founder and the first commander of the IRGC's Air Force. Refan wanted to transform the military branch into a major aerial warfare force parallel to the regular air force. He resigned in 1990, reportedly due to what he deemed lack of sufficient support from IRGC leadership, according to Jamal S. Suwaidi.

== Energy sector career ==
Following departure from the IRGC, Refan entered MAPNA Group. He was manager and director of management committee of MAPNA for 17 years from its establishment to 2009.

== Views ==
According to the Israeli institute Intelligence and Terrorism Information Center, Refan is regarded a principlist figure within Iranian political spectrum.

Business positions
New title	Chief Executive Officer of MAPNA Group; 1993–2009	Succeeded by Abbas Aliabadi
Military offices
New title Branch created	Commander of the Air Force of the Islamic Revolutionary Guard Corps; 1985–1990	Succeeded by Hossein Dehghan
