= Qaheh =

Village in Isfahan province, Iran

Qaheh Persian: قهه
- Village
- Location within Iran
- Coordinates: 32°07′32″N 51°40′53″E
- Country: Iran
- Province: Isfahan
- County: Dehaqan
- District: Central
- Rural District: Qombovan

Population (2016)
  - Total: 784
- Time zone: UTC+3:30 (IRST)

Qaheh (Persian: قهه) (Note: Also romanized as Qoheh; also known as Kūheh) is a village in Qombovan Rural District of the Central District in Dehaqan County, (Note: Formerly Semirom-e Sofla County) Isfahan province, Iran.

== Demographics ==
At the time of the 2006 National Census, the village's population was 1,011 in 316 households. The following census in 2011 counted 950 people in 308 households. The 2016 census measured the population of the village as 784 people in 264 households.
