= Laricheh =

Village in Isfahan province, Iran

Laricheh Persian: لاريچه
- Village
- Location within Iran
- Coordinates: 32°01′54″N 51°41′16″E
- Country: Iran
- Province: Isfahan
- County: Dehaqan
- District: Central
- Rural District: Musaabad

Population (2016)
  - Total: 134
- Time zone: UTC+3:30 (IRST)

Laricheh (Persian: لاريچه) (Note: Also romanized as Lārīcheh; also known as Lārcheh) is a village in Musaabad Rural District of the Central District in Dehaqan County, (Note: Formerly Semirom-e Sofla County) Isfahan province, Iran.

== Demographics ==
=== Population ===
At the time of the 2006 National Census, the village's population was 286 in 85 households. The following census in 2011 counted 188 people in 65 households. The 2016 census measured the population of the village as 134 people in 48 households.
