= Hamgin =

Village in Isfahan province, Iran

Hamgin Persian: همگين
- Village
- Location within Iran
- Coordinates: 31°54′37″N 51°28′15″E
- Country: Iran
- Province: Isfahan
- County: Dehaqan
- District: Central
- Rural District: Hamgin

Population (2016)
  - Total: 1,171
- Time zone: UTC+3:30 (IRST)

Hamgin (Persian: همگين) (Note: Also romanized as Hamgīn) is a village in, and the capital of, Hamgin Rural District in the Central District of Dehaqan County, (Note: Formerly Semirom-e Sofla County) Isfahan province, Iran.

== Demographics ==
=== Population ===
At the time of the 2006 National Census, the village's population was 1,435 in 409 households. The following census in 2011 counted 1,352 people in 439 households. The 2016 census measured the population of the village as 1,171 people in 381 households.
