= Ganj-e Qobad =

Village in Isfahan province, Iran

Ganj-e Qobad Persian: گنج قباد
- Village
- Location within Iran
- Coordinates: 32°07′58″N 51°38′49″E
- Country: Iran
- Province: Isfahan
- County: Dehaqan
- District: Central
- Rural District: Qombovan

Population (2016)
  - Total: 18
- Time zone: UTC+3:30 (IRST)

Ganj-e Qobad (Persian: گنج قباد) (Note: Also romanized as Ganj Qobād and Ganj-e Qobād) is a village in Qombovan Rural District of the Central District in Dehaqan County, (Note: Formerly Semirom-e Sofla County) Isfahan province, Iran.

== Demographics ==
At the time of the 2006 National Census, the village's population was 55 in 22 households. The following census in 2011 counted 44 people in 15 households. The 2016 census measured the population of the village as 18 people in eight households.
