= Qomishlu =

Village in Isfahan province, Iran

Qomishlu Persian: قميشلو
- Village
- Location within Iran
- Coordinates: 32°02′46″N 51°28′12″E
- Country: Iran
- Province: Isfahan
- County: Dehaqan
- District: Central
- Rural District: Hamgin

Population (2016)
  - Total: 1,304
- Time zone: UTC+3:30 (IRST)

Qomishlu (Persian: قميشلو) (Note: Also romanized as Qamīshlū, Qomīshlū, and Qəmīshlū; also known as Qameshlū and Qomeshlū) is a village in Hamgin Rural District of the Central District in Dehaqan County, (Note: Formerly Semirom-e Sofla County) Isfahan province, Iran.

== Demographics ==
=== Population ===
At the time of the 2006 National Census, the village's population was 1,687 in 471 households. The following census in 2011 counted 1,526 people in 455 households. The 2016 census measured the population of the village as 1,304 people in 418 households.
