= Mahmudabad, Dehaqan =

Village in Isfahan province, Iran

Mahmudabad Persian: محموداباد
- Village
- Location within Iran
- Coordinates: 31°56′23″N 51°43′11″E
- Country: Iran
- Province: Isfahan
- County: Dehaqan
- District: Central
- Rural District: Musaabad

Population (2016)
  - Total: 342
- Time zone: UTC+3:30 (IRST)

Mahmudabad (Persian: محموداباد) (Note: Also romanized as Maḩmūdābād) is a village in Musaabad Rural District of the Central District in Dehaqan County, (Note: Formerly Semirom-e Sofla County) Isfahan province, Iran.

== Demographics ==
=== Population ===
At the time of the 2006 National Census, the village's population was 294 in 85 households. The following census in 2011 counted 355 people in 115 households. The 2016 census measured the population of the village as 342 people in 118 households, the most populous in its rural district.
