= Mohammad Atabak =

Iranian politician

Seyyed Mohammad Atabak
- محمد اتابک
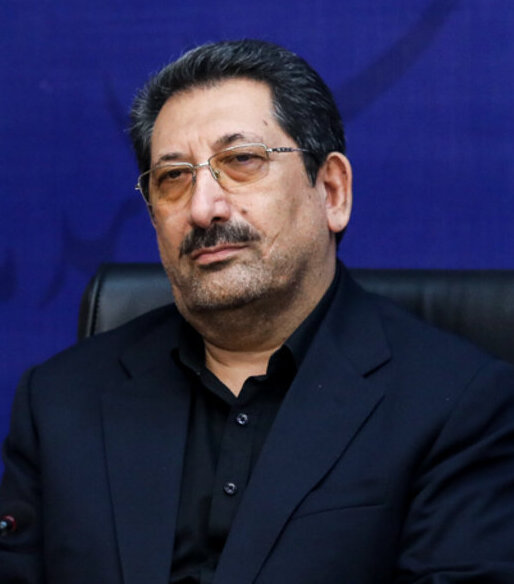
- Atabak in 2024

Minister of Industry, Mine and Trade
- Incumbent
- Assumed office 21 August 2024
- President: Masoud Pezeshkian
- Preceded by: Abbas Aliabadi

Personal details
- Born: 1958 (age 67–68)
- Education: University of Michigan

Mohammad Atabak (Persian: محمد اتابک; born 1958) is an Iranian executive director and politician who has been serving as the Minister of Industry, Mines and Trade since 2024.

== Biography ==
Atabak has a master of civil engineering from the University of Michigan, US.

He served as vice president of the board of directors of Ekbatan Company, as well as a member and chairman of the board of directors of various companies, including Bank Maskan, SADRA company, and several other manufacturing companies. He has also been the executive of Navvab Expressway, hospitals and various cement and steel factories in the country. Among his past duties he served as president of the Employers' Association of the Cement Industry of the country. chairman of the board of Cement Association and Tehran Cement. Member of the Advisory Council of the Ministry of Industries and Parliament. He served as a member and chairman of the board of directors of Bank Maskan and SADRA company. He served as CEO of Tehran Cement for eight years from 2003 to 2011. He served as CEO of Kaveh Pars Mineral Industries Holding from 2011 to 2019. He was a member of the Board of Representatives and Vice President of Tehran Chamber of Commerce from 2013 to 2021. The expansion of Kaveh Pars Mining Industries Since 2018, he has been appointed as the economic vice president of Mostazafan Foundation. In 2020, the US Treasury Department's Office of Foreign Assets Control, following Executive order 13876 of Donald Trump, added Mustafafan Foundation and Mohammad Atabak to its black list of special sanctioned persons due to being CEO of Kaveh Pars Mineral Industries Holding. He was Economic Vice President of Mostazafan Foundation since 2018. In December 2023 with the replacement of Hossein Dehghan with Parviz Fattah as the head of the foundation, Atabak left this position. On 21 August 2024 he was confirmed as Minister of Industry, Mine and Trade in the Government of Masoud Pezeshkian, replacing Abbas Aliabadi.
