= Kareh, Isfahan =

Village in Isfahan province, Iran

Kareh Persian: كره
- Village
- Location within Iran
- Coordinates: 32°00′02″N 51°39′55″E
- Country: Iran
- Province: Isfahan
- County: Dehaqan
- District: Central
- Rural District: Musaabad

Population (2016)
  - Total: 280
- Time zone: UTC+3:30 (IRST)

Kareh (Persian: كره) is a village in Musaabad Rural District of the Central District in Dehaqan County, (Note: Formerly Semirom-e Sofla County) Isfahan province, Iran.

== Demographics ==
=== Population ===
At the time of the 2006 National Census, the village's population was 371 in 109 households. The following census in 2011 counted 347 people in 114 households. The 2016 census measured the population of the village as 280 people in 104 households.
