= Hossein Rajaei Rizi =

Iranian politician

- In office September 27, 2020 – May 26, 2024
- Preceded by: Mohsen Kouhkan
- Succeeded by: Akbar Pouladi

Personal details
- Born: Isfahan Province
- Party: Iranian Principlists
- Spouse: Not mentioned
- Occupation: Representative of the (Iranian) Parliament (2020-2024)
- Profession: Politician

Hossein Rajaei Rizi (Persian: حسین رجایی ریزی) is an Iranian Principlist, who was representative of Iran's Islamic Consultative Assembly from 2020 to 2024. He was elected at the second round of the parliament elections on 12 September 2020 as the representative of Lenjan (Isfahan).

Hossein Rajaei Rizi who participated in the Mjales (parliament) elections as Lenjan-candidate, ultimately obtained 14127 votes, and won the competition with his rival (Ali Yousef-pour). Mohsen Kouhkan was the responsible in the mentioned position before Hossein Rajaei-Rizi—at the previous period of the Islamic Consultative Assembly.

== See also ==
- Islamic Consultative Assembly
- Somayeh Mahmoudi (Represents Shahreza and Dehaqan of Isfahan Province)
- Hossein-Ali Haji-Deligani (Represents Shahin Shahr and Meymeh County of Isfahan Province)
