= Qombovan =

Village in Isfahan province, Iran

Qombovan Persian: قمبوان
- Village
- Location within Iran
- Coordinates: 32°08′43″N 51°38′28″E
- Country: Iran
- Province: Isfahan
- County: Dehaqan
- District: Central
- Rural District: Qombovan

Population (2016)
  - Total: 1,623
- Time zone: UTC+3:30 (IRST)

Qombovan (Persian: قمبوان) (Note: Also romanized as Qambovān, Qombavān, and Qombovān; also known as Ghombasvan, Kombon, Kūmāon, and Qumboān) is a village in, and the capital of, Qombovan Rural District in the Central District of Dehaqan County, (Note: Formerly Semirom-e Sofla County) Isfahan province, Iran.

== History and heritage ==
Archaeological and architectural remains found in Qombovan indicate longstanding human settlement in the region. The stone gates of the village’s agricultural gardens are considered among its oldest surviving structures, with parallels in the nearby areas of Tiran and in the ancient garden complexes around the Aryan Hill region of Khansar.

Some local researchers propose that these stone gates may date to pre-Achaemenid or pre-Aryan periods, during eras of Assyrian influence over Iranian tribes, prior to the unification of the Median settlements and the fall of Assyria.

The Jameh (Blue) Mosque of Qombovan is attributed to the Safavid period. The earliest inscribed date on its walls corresponds to the year 1006 AH. A stone inscription in the mosque’s mihrab is present but has not yet been deciphered.

A Hebrew inscription reported from Qombovan suggests the historical presence of Jewish inhabitants in the village. Oral testimonies from long-standing families in the area, along with preliminary DNA results from descendants originating from Qombovan, further support the possibility that some families in the region may have Jewish ancestry predating the mass conversions and displacements that occurred during the Safavid period.

Other notable historical structures include the Shabestan Mosque, estimated to be around 200 years old, and the old caravanserai of Qombovan. Traditional watermills once used to grind wheat and barley remain part of the village’s historical landscape. The Safavid-era oil-press (Asar-khaneh) used horse-driven millstones to extract oil from seeds.

Numerous towers were constructed in various periods—particularly during the Safavid era—for agricultural use and watchkeeping; several of these structures remain standing today. Other heritage sites include the Chehel Dokhtaran structure, the shrine of Seyyed Mohammad Baqer, and the village’s historic bathhouses.

== Demographics ==
=== Population ===
At the time of the 2006 National Census, the village's population was 1,792 in 548 households. The following census in 2011 counted 1,719 people in 551 households. The 2016 census measured the population of the village as 1,623 people in 557 households.
