= Aliabad-e Gachi =

Village in Isfahan province, Iran

Aliabad-e Gachi Persian: علي ابادگچي
- Village
- Location within Iran
- Coordinates: 31°56′02″N 51°46′56″E
- Country: Iran
- Province: Isfahan
- County: Dehaqan
- District: Central
- Rural District: Musaabad

Population (2016)
  - Total: 284
- Time zone: UTC+3:30 (IRST)

Aliabad-e Gachi (Persian: علي ابادگچي) (Note: Also romanized as ‘Alīābād-e Gachī; also known as ‘Alīābād and ‘Alīābād-e Gachchī) is a village in Musaabad Rural District of the Central District in Dehaqan County, (Note: Formerly Semirom-e Sofla County) Isfahan province, Iran.

== Demographics ==
=== Population ===
At the time of the 2006 National Census, the village's population was 393 in 125 households. The following census in 2011 counted 336 people in 121 households. The 2016 census measured the population of the village as 284 people in 107 households.
