= Aliabad-e Jombozeh =

Village in Isfahan province, Iran

Aliabad-e Jombozeh Persian: علي ابادجمبزه
- Village
- Location within Iran
- Coordinates: 32°10′56″N 51°37′40″E
- Country: Iran
- Province: Isfahan
- County: Dehaqan
- District: Central
- Rural District: Qombovan

Population (2016)
  - Total: 1,304
- Time zone: UTC+3:30 (IRST)

Aliabad-e Jombozeh (Persian: علي ابادجمبزه) (Note: Also romanized as ‘Alīābād-e Jombozeh; also known as ‘Alīābād) is a village in Qombovan Rural District of the Central District in Dehaqan County, (Note: Formerly Semirom-e Sofla County) Isfahan province, Iran.

== Demographics ==
At the time of the 2006 National Census, the village's population was 1,305 in 355 households. The following census in 2011 counted 1,388 people in 417 households. The 2016 census measured the population of the village as 1,304 people in 392 households.
