= Dezej, Isfahan =

Village in Isfahan province, Iran

Dezej Persian: دزج
- Village
- Location within Iran
- Coordinates: 31°55′10″N 51°31′43″E
- Country: Iran
- Province: Isfahan
- County: Dehaqan
- District: Central
- Rural District: Hamgin

Population (2016)
  - Total: 1,773
- Time zone: UTC+3:30 (IRST)

Dezej (Persian: دزج) (Note: Also known as Dīzej) is a village in Hamgin Rural District of the Central District in Dehaqan County, (Note: Formerly Semirom-e Sofla County) Isfahan province, Iran.

== Demographics ==
=== Population ===
At the time of the 2006 National Census, the village's population was 1,568 in 347 households. The following census in 2011 counted 1,822 people in 468 households. The 2016 census measured the population of the village as 1,773 people in 500 households, the most populous in its rural district.
