= Pudeh, Isfahan =

Village in Isfahan province, Iran

Pudeh Persian: پوده
- Village
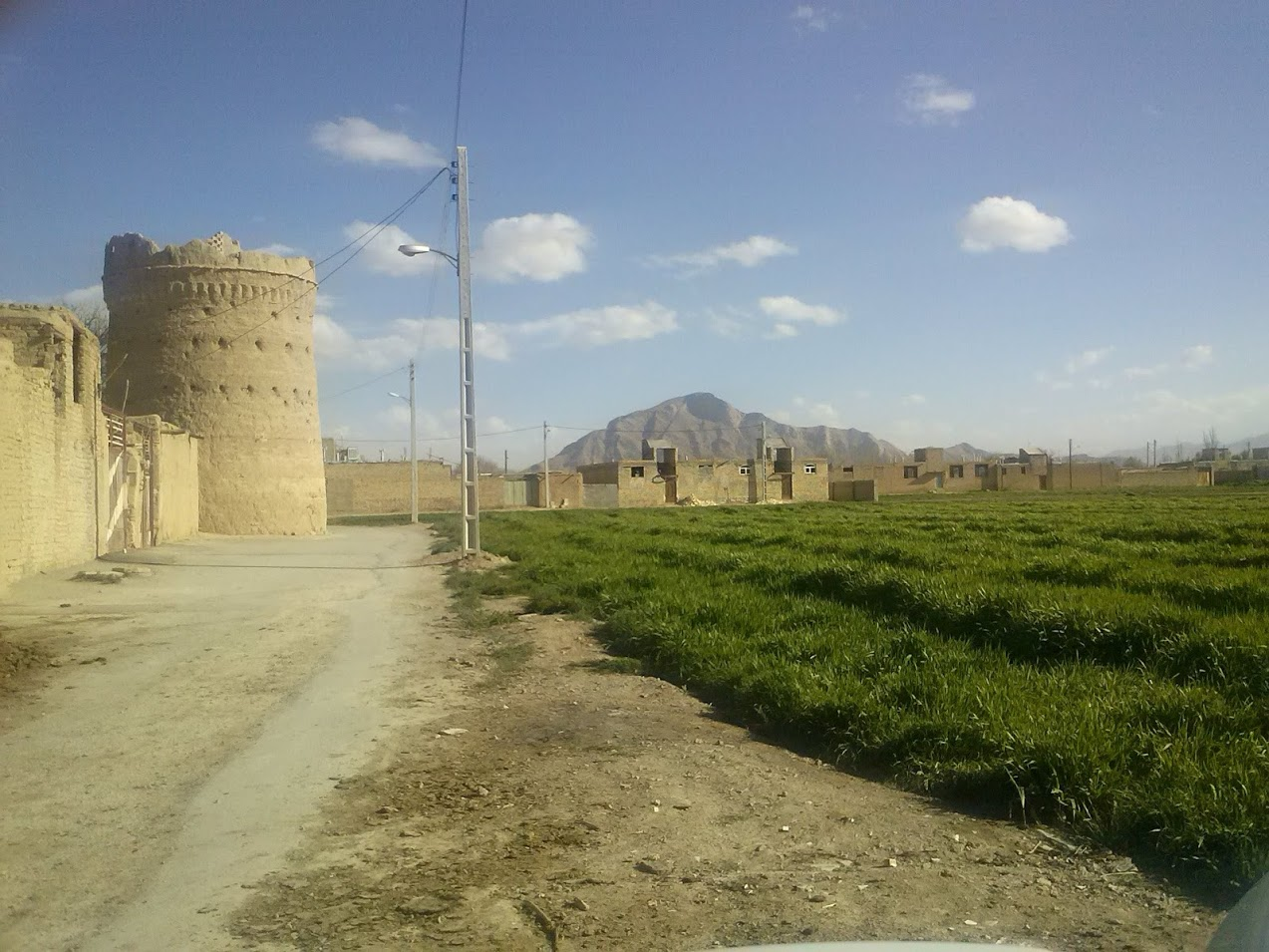
- The village of Pudeh

- Location within Iran
- Coordinates: 32°07′06″N 51°40′00″E
- Country: Iran
- Province: Isfahan
- County: Dehaqan
- District: Central
- Rural District: Qombovan

Population (2016)
  - Total: 1,945
- Time zone: UTC+3:30 (IRST)

Pudeh (Persian: پوده) (Note: Also romanized as Poudeh and Pūdeh) is a village in Qombovan Rural District of the Central District in Dehaqan County, (Note: Formerly Semirom-e Sofla County) Isfahan province, Iran.

== Demographics ==
=== Language ===
The vast majority of the town is Persian-speaking with a Qashqai Turkic-speaking minority.

=== Population ===
At the time of the 2006 National Census, the village's population was 2,183 in 621 households. The following census in 2011 counted 2,120 people in 652 households. The 2016 census measured the population of the village as 1,945 people in 641 households, the most populous in its rural district.

== Notable people ==
- Hossein Dehghan - Minister of Defense, retired IRGC Air Force officer, 2021 presidential election candidate
