= Jombozeh =

Jombozeh or Jombezeh (Persian: جمبزه) may refer to:

- Jombozeh, Isfahan
- Jombozeh, Dehaqan, Isfahan Province
