= List of Russian military cooperation agreements with other countries =

== Americas ==
Country	Details
Nicaragua	The government of Nicaraguan President Daniel Ortega has authorised Russian troops, planes and ships to deploy to Nicaragua for purposes of training, law enforcement or emergency response.

== Europe ==
Country	Details
Belarus	Russia and Belarus have maintained close military cooperation since the fall of the Soviet Union.
Serbia	Russia wants to continue its military cooperation with Serbia, its main ally, while also encouraging the militarization of the Republic Srpska in terms of military influence. Although Belgrade is content with the level of cooperation it currently enjoys with Moscow, it aspires to avoid becoming a Russian stronghold in the Balkans. In reality, Russia is just one of many security players in the Balkans, competing with China and being overshadowed by NATO.
Transnistria	

== Africa ==
Country	Details
Burkina Faso	
Central African Republic	In 2018, according to Russian news agencies, the agreement was signed by the C.A.R.'s Marie-Noelle Koyara and Russian Defense Minister Sergei Shoigu outside of a state-sponsored arms show.
Eritrea	
Mali	Russian Foreign Minister Sergey Lavrov announced increased military assistance for the Malian military junta while visiting Mali. Mali's efforts to put down an Islamist insurgency in the Sahel will be supported, according to Moscow.
Zimbabwe	Zimbabwe and Russia plan to develop military-technical cooperation, in which the eastern European country would intensify its supply of weapons to the Zimbabwean army.

== Asia ==
Country	Details
Afghanistan	Limited cooperation agreements
Azerbaijan	In 2023, Russia and Azerbaijan signed a joint wide-ranging political-military agreement.
China	
India	In 2021, Russia and India signed a 10-year defense cooperation pact.
Iran	On January 20, Russian Defense Minister Sergei Shoigu and Iranian Defense Minister Hossein Dehghan signed an intergovernmental agreement on "long term and multifaceted" military cooperation in Tehran, Iran. For the first time in 15 years, a Russian defense minister is visiting Iran, underscoring the growing military and diplomatic ties between the two countries as well as their shared opposition to American foreign policy in the Middle East and elsewhere.
Kazakhstan	Lawmakers in Kazakhstan have ratified an updated military cooperation deal with Russia that replaces a previous emphasis on issues like nuclear disarmament in favor of regional security, anti-terrorism and cybersecurity.
Kyrgyzstan	Member of the CSTO
Laos	
Myanmar	Russia has supported the military junta of Myanmar run by General Min Aung Hlaing.
North Korea	Military cooperation expanded in 2023.
Pakistan	
Saudi Arabia	Agreement signed in 2021.
Syria	In 2015, Russia began air strikes in Syria to support Assad's struggling troops.
Tajikistan	Member of the CSTO
Uzbekistan	Military cooperation of Russia and Uzbekistan are regulated primarily by the Treaty of Friendship and Cooperation of May 30, 1992.
Vietnam	In 2021, Russia and Vietnam signed a military-technical deal.

== See also ==
- Foreign relations of Russia
- Shanghai Cooperation Organization
- Collective Security Treaty Organization
