= National smart metering program (Iran) =

The National Smart Metering Program (FAHAM) in a smart grid implementation in Iran. The implementation of smart grid is regarded as a way for encountering many serious present-day environmental and economic challenges. The functional, technical, security, economic, and general requirements of this project were published as a document after development by a longtime workgroup of various stakeholders, including representative of grid operators, meter manufactures, communication providers, business layer software providers, as well as domestic and international consultants. The procedure of producing this document was based on EPRI Methodology (IEC 62559). In these technical documents, all of the business and functional use cases, the conceptual architecture, mandatory international standards for electric, water and gas metering systems (for all types of consumers), telecommunication requirements, system interfaces and security mandates are defined. The ministry of energy decided to perform a pilot project called FAHAM-phase1, in order to experiment the execution and technical challenges for implementing smart metering for all of the about 30 million consumers.

== History ==
In January 2010, the Iranian parliament regulated that Tavanir and Grid operators shall decrease electricity grid loss by at least 1% per year with 14% overall network loss in 2015. This decision has also been stated in clause 47 of the "targeted subsidy law." In March 2009, Tavanir assigned IEEO as Iranian advanced metering infrastructure (AMI) project manager. In April 2010, government decided to support finance of national smart metering roll-out to facilitate power network technical and non technical loss decreasing as well as demand management. Deploying an AMI is an essential early step to grid modernization. AMI is not a single technology; rather, it is an integration of many technologies such as smart meter, communication network, and management system, that provides an intelligent connection between consumers and system operators. AMI gives system operator and consumers the information they need to make smart decisions, and also the ability to execute those decisions that they are not currently able to do. IEEO is responsible for the implementation and deployment of the smart metering project called FAHAM in Iran. The IEEO follows promoting energy efficiency and load management, improve system reliability, and reduce operational costs by implementing smart metering project.

=== Awards ===
FAHAM was a candidate for the Green Project Award and received the green management certificate of European association of green management in 2014.

== Functionality ==
FAHAM transforms the meter from a simple measuring and counting device, to one element of an integrated system of hardware, software and people that can be used to better manage the electric service. FAHAM entails hardware and software architecture capable of capturing real-time consumption, demand, voltage, current and other information. Data can be provided at the customer level and for other enterprise level systems either on a scheduled basis or on demand. FAHAM will communicate this data to a central location, sorting and analyzing it for a variety of purposes such as customer billing, outage response, system loading conditions and demand side management. FAHAM as a two-way communication network, will also send this information to other systems, customers and third parties, as well as send information back through the network and meters to capture additional data, control equipment and update the configuration and software of equipments.
