= Namjoo =

Namjoo (Persian: نامجو) is a Persian surname. Notable people with this surname include:

- Mahmoud Namjoo (Persian: محمود نامجو; 1918–1990), Iranian weightlifter
- Mousa Namjoo (Persian: موسی نامجو; 1938–1981), Iranian military officer
- Majid Namjoo (Persian: مجيد نامجو; born 1963), Iranian politician
- Majid Namjoo-Motlagh (Persian: مجید نامجو مطلق; born 1967), Iranian soccer player
- Mohsen Namjoo (Persian: محسن نامجو; born 1976), Iranian singer-songwriter and player
