= Ahmad Reza Yalameha =

4th President of Islamic Azad University of Dehaqan
- In office 2014–Now
- Appointed by: Hamid Mirzadeh
- Preceded by: Ahmad Azin

Personal details
- Born: Isfahan, Talkhvoncheh
- Education: University of Isfahan
- Occupation: Professor, Superior researcher and University presidency
- Profession: PhD in Persian Language and Literature
- Website: yalameha.ir

Ahmadreza Yalameha (born in Iran, Isfahan) is a writer, researcher and the 4th President of the Islamic Azad University of Dehaqan. His major specialty focuses on codicology and identification of ancient texts. His work contributions include 30 books and 100 research scientific articles.

Mr. Yalameha is a young researcher who is a full professor and his research interests include literature, comparative literature, study of Rumi, study of Hafez, codicology and identification.

== Careers ==
- Quarterly didactic Literature Review Journal manager editor-in-chief
- Editorial Board Members

== See also ==
- Higher education in Iran
- Islamic Azad University

== Significant works ==
- https://www.researchgate.net/publication/321225446_thlyl_mnzwmh_ghnayy_wamq_w_dhra
- http://www.ijch.net/index.php?m=content&c=index&a=show&catid=44&id=386
