= Jombozeh, Dehaqan =

Village in Isfahan province, Iran

Jombozeh Persian: جمبزه
- Village
- Location within Iran
- Coordinates: 32°10′03″N 51°37′45″E
- Country: Iran
- Province: Isfahan
- County: Dehaqan
- District: Central
- Rural District: Qombovan

Population (2016)
  - Total: 131
- Time zone: UTC+3:30 (IRST)

Jombozeh (Persian: جمبزه) (Note: Also romanized as Jombezeh; also known as Jonbozeh and Jumbazeh) is a village in Qombovan Rural District of the Central District in Dehaqan County, (Note: Formerly Semirom-e Sofla County) Isfahan province, Iran.

== Demographics ==
At the time of the 2006 National Census, the village's population was 192 in 52 households. The following census in 2011 counted 163 people in 51 households. The 2016 census measured the population of the village as 131 people in 46 households.
