= Somayeh Mahmoudi =

Iranian politician

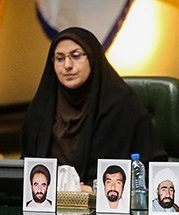

Member of the Parliament of Iran
- In office 28 May 2016 – 27 May 2024
- Constituency: Shahreza and Dehaqan
- Majority: 28,905

Personal details
- Born: Somayeh Mahmoudi; March 21, 1984 (age 42) Shahreza, Iran
- Party: Independent
- Children: 1
- Relatives: Gholamreza Mahmoudi (father)

Somayeh Mahmoudi (Persian: سمیه محمودی) is an Iranian politician and former member of the Parliament of Iran. She represented Shahreza and Dehaqan district, from 2016 to 2024.
