= Ministry of Industry, Mine and Trade =

Government ministry of Iran

- وزارت صنعت، معدن و تجارت; Vezārat-e Sannat, Madan va Tejārat

Agency overview
- Formed: 3 August 2011; 15 years ago
- Preceding agencies: Ministry of Industries and Mines; Ministry of Commerce
- Jurisdiction: Government of the Islamic Republic of Iran
- Employees: 45,040 (2019)
- Agency executive: Mohammad Atabak

The Ministry of Industry, Mine and Trade (Persian: وزارت صنعت، معدن و تجارت) is an Iranian government body responsible for the regulation and implementation of policies applicable to domestic and foreign trade and also regulation and implementation of policies applicable to industrial and mine sectors that formed on 3 August 2011. The ministry resulted from the merger of the Ministry of Industries and Mines and Ministry of Commerce.

== List of ministers ==
No.	Portrait	Name	Took office	Left office	Party	President
1		Mehdi Ghazanfari	3 August 2011	15 August 2013	Independent	Mahmoud Ahmadinejad
2		Mohammad Reza Nematzadeh	15 August 2013	20 August 2017	Moderation and Development Party	Hassan Rouhani
3		Mohammad Shariatmadari	20 August 2017	20 October 2018	Independent	Hassan Rouhani
4		Reza Rahmani	28 October 2018	11 May 2020	Moderation and Development Party	Hassan Rouhani
5		Ali Reza Razm Hosseini	29 September 2020	25 August 2021	Independent	Hassan Rouhani
6		Reza Fatemi-Amin	25 August 2021	30 April 2023	Independent	Ebrahim Raisi
7		Abbas Aliabadi	13 June 2023	21 August 2024	Independent	Ebrahim Raisi
8		Mohammad Atabak	21 August 2024		Independent	Masoud Pezeshkian

== See also ==
- Cabinet of Iran
- Government of Iran
- Industry of Iran
- Economy of Iran
