= Hamgin Rural District =

Rural district in Isfahan province, Iran

Hamgin Rural District Persian: دهستان همگين
- Rural District
- Location within Iran
- Coordinates: 31°56′N 51°31′E
- Country: Iran
- Province: Isfahan
- County: Dehaqan
- District: Central
- Established: 1987
- Capital: Hamgin

Population (2016)
  - Total: 4,250
- Time zone: UTC+3:30 (IRST)

Hamgin Rural District (Persian: دهستان همگين) is in the Central District of Dehaqan County, (Note: Formerly Semirom-e Sofla County) Isfahan province, Iran. Its capital is the village of Hamgin.

== Demographics ==
=== Population ===
At the time of the 2006 National Census, the rural district's population was 4,695 in 1,228 households. There were 4,708 inhabitants in 1,367 households at the following census of 2011. The 2016 census measured the population of the rural district as 4,250 in 1,300 households. The most populous of its 17 villages was Dezej, with 1,773 people.

=== Other villages in the rural district ===
- Qomishlu
