= Ali Reza Razm Hosseini =

Iranian politician (born 1961)

- علیرضا رزم‌حسینی
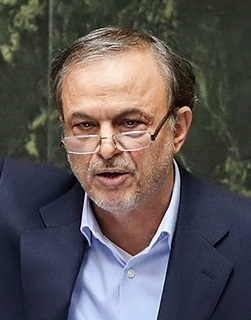

Minister of Industry, Mines and Business
- In office 29 September 2020 – 25 August 2021
- President: Hassan Rouhani
- Preceded by: Reza Rahmani
- Succeeded by: Reza Fatemi Amin

Governor of Razavi Khorasan Province
- In office 2 January 2019 – 29 September 2020
- President: Hassan Rouhani
- Preceded by: Ghorban Mirzaei (acting)
- Succeeded by: Hassan Jafari (acting)

Governor of Kerman Province
- In office 1 December 2013 – 31 May 2018
- President: Hassan Rouhani
- Preceded by: Esmaeil Najjar
- Succeeded by: Mohammad Fadaei

Personal details
- Born: 1961 (age 64–65) Kerman, Iran
- Education: SBUK

Ali Reza Razm Hosseini (Persian: علیرضا رزم‌حسینی, born 1961) is an Iranian politician and former Minister of Industry, Mines and Business from September 29, 2020, to August 25, 2021. He was the governor of Khorasan Razavi Province from January 2019 to September 2020 and also governor of Kerman Province from 2013 to 2018. He was serving in the Government of Hassan Rouhani from 2013 to 2021.

== Early life and education ==
Hosseini was born in Kerman in Kerman Province. After the Islamic Revolution he was one of the founders of Kerman students’ Islamic Association Union formation and the first elected president of this formation in 1979.
