= Qombovan Rural District =

Rural district in Isfahan province, Iran

Qombovan Rural District Persian: دهستان قمبوان
- Rural District
- Location within Iran
- Coordinates: 32°08′N 51°37′E
- Country: Iran
- Province: Isfahan
- County: Dehaqan
- District: Central
- Established: 1987
- Capital: Qombovan

Population (2016)
  - Total: 5,806
- Time zone: UTC+3:30 (IRST)

Qombovan Rural District (Persian: دهستان قمبوان) is in the Central District of Dehaqan County, (Note: Formerly Semirom-e Sofla County) Isfahan province, Iran. Its capital is the village of Qombovan.

== Demographics ==
=== Population ===
At the time of the 2006 National Census, the rural district's population was 6,566 in 1,926 households. There were 6,393 inhabitants in 1,998 households at the following census of 2011. The 2016 census measured the population of the rural district as 5,806 in 1,909 households. The most populous of its 23 villages was Pudeh, with 1,945 people.

=== Other villages in the rural district ===
- Aliabad-e Jombozeh
- Ganj-e Qobad
- Jombozeh
- Qaheh
