= Reza Fatemi Amin =

Iranian politician

Seyyed Reza Fatemi Amin
- رضا فاطمی‌امین
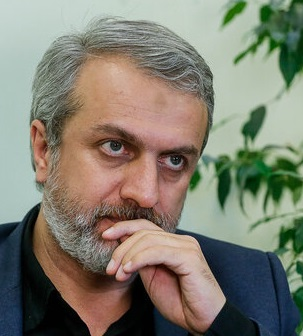

Minister of Industry, Mines and Business
- In office 25 August 2021 – 30 April 2023
- President: Ebrahim Raisi
- Preceded by: Ali Reza Razm Hosseini
- Succeeded by: Mahdi Niazi (Acting) Abbas Aliabadi

Deputy Custodian of Astan Quds Razavi
- In office 1 January 2019 – 2 June 2019
- Appointed by: Ebrahim Raisi
- Preceded by: Morteza Bakhtiari
- Succeeded by: Mostafa Khaksar Ghohroudi

Personal details
- Born: 1974 (age 51–52) Shahrud, Iran
- Education: Ferdowsi University of Mashhad; Iran University of Science and Technology; Supreme National Defense University

Seyed Reza Fatemi Amin (Persian: سید رضا فاطمی امین; born 1974 in Shahrud, Iran) is an Iranian politician who served as Advisor to the President of Iran from 2023 to 2024 and the Minister of Industry, Mines and Trade In the thirteenth government of the Islamic Republic of Iran from 2021 to 2023.

On April 30, 2023, the impeachment hearing of Fatemi Amin was held, and after investigating and listening to his positive and negative opinions, the deputies of the Islamic Council dismissed Fatemi Amin from the ministry of silence with 102 votes against and 162 votes in favor, 2 abstentions and 6 invalid votes. Fatemi Amin's impeachers accused him of not fulfilling his promises, presenting wrong statistics and prioritizing the interests of two major Iranian automobile companies.
