= Golshan, Isfahan =

City in Isfahan province, Iran

Golshan Persian: گلشن
- City
- Location within Iran
- Coordinates: 31°56′05″N 51°45′07″E
- Country: Iran
- Province: Isfahan
- County: Dehaqan
- District: Central
- Established as a city: 2010

Population (2016)
  - Total: 5,437
- Time zone: UTC+3:30 (IRST)

Golshan (Persian: گلشن) (Note: Formerly Musaabad (موسي اباد), also romanized as Mūsáābād, Mūsā Ābād, and Mūsábbād) is a city in the Central District of Dehaqan County, Isfahan province, Iran, serving as the administrative center for Musaabad Rural District.

== Demographics ==
=== Population ===
At the time of the 2006 National Census, its population (as the village of Musaabad in Musaabad Rural District) was 3,628 in 1,077 households. The following census in 2011 counted 5,058 people in 1,576 households, by which time the village had been converted to a city and was renamed Golshan after merging with the villages of Dowlatabad and Mehdiabad. The 2016 census measured the population of the city as 5,437 people in 1,736 households.
