= Habibollah Bitaraf =

Iranian reformist politician

Minister of Energy
- In office 20 August 1997 – 24 August 2005
- President: Mohammad Khatami
- Preceded by: Bijan Namdar Zangeneh
- Succeeded by: Parviz Fattah

Governor of Yazd Province
- In office 1986–1989
- President: Ali Khamenei
- Prime Minister: Mir-Hossein Mousavi
- Preceded by: Morteza Fattah
- Succeeded by: Abdulali Hamidia

Personal details
- Born: 1956 (age 69–70) Yazd, Iran
- Party: Islamic Iran Participation Front
- Education: University of Tehran
- Profession: Civil engineer

Habibolah Bitaraf (Persian: حبیب‌الله بی‌طرف) is an Iranian reformist politician. He was Energy Minister for 8 years during Mohammad Khatami presidency. He also served as provincial governor of Yazd.

He was nominated as the energy minister by President Hassan Rouhani on 8 August 2017 but he was the only nominee who did not gain a vote of confidence from the parliament on 20 August 2017, with 133 yeas, 132 nays, 17 abstentions and 6 invalid votes.

Bitaraf is a founding member of the Islamic Iran Participation Front.
