= Majid Namjoo =

Iranian politician

- مجید نامجو
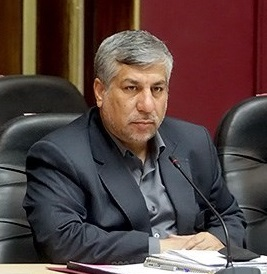

Minister of Energy
- In office 15 November 2009 – 15 August 2013; Acting: 6 September 2009 – 15 November 2009
- President: Mahmoud Ahmadinejad
- Preceded by: Parviz Fattah
- Succeeded by: Hamid Chitchian

Personal details
- Born: c. 1962 (age 63–64) Kerman, Iran
- Education: Shahid Bahonar University

Military service
- Allegiance: Iran
- Branch/service: Revolutionary Guards
- Years of service: 1979–2003
- Unit: 41st Division; Khatam al-Anbiya
- Battles/wars: Iran–Iraq War

Majid Namjoo (Persian: مجيد نامجو) is an Iranian politician who was the minister of energy in second cabinet of Mahmoud Ahmadinejad.

== Early life ==
Namjoo was born in Tehran on 5 January 1963.

== Career ==
Namjoo was a member of Kerman city Council from 2001 to 2008 and became deputy minister of energy in February 2008. President Mahmoud Ahmadinejad nominated Namjoo as minister of energy in August 2009 and he was approved by the Majlis as the minister with 210 out of 290 votes. Namjoo's tenure ended on 15 August 2013 and he was replaced by Hamid Chitchian in the post.

== Sanctions ==
Namjoo was put by the European Union into the sanction list due to his connection to Iran's nuclear program on 16 October 2012.

Political offices
Preceded by Parviz Fattah	Minister of Energy; 2009–2013	Succeeded by Hamid Chitchian
