= Abbas Aliabadi =

Iranian politician

- عباس علی‌آبادی
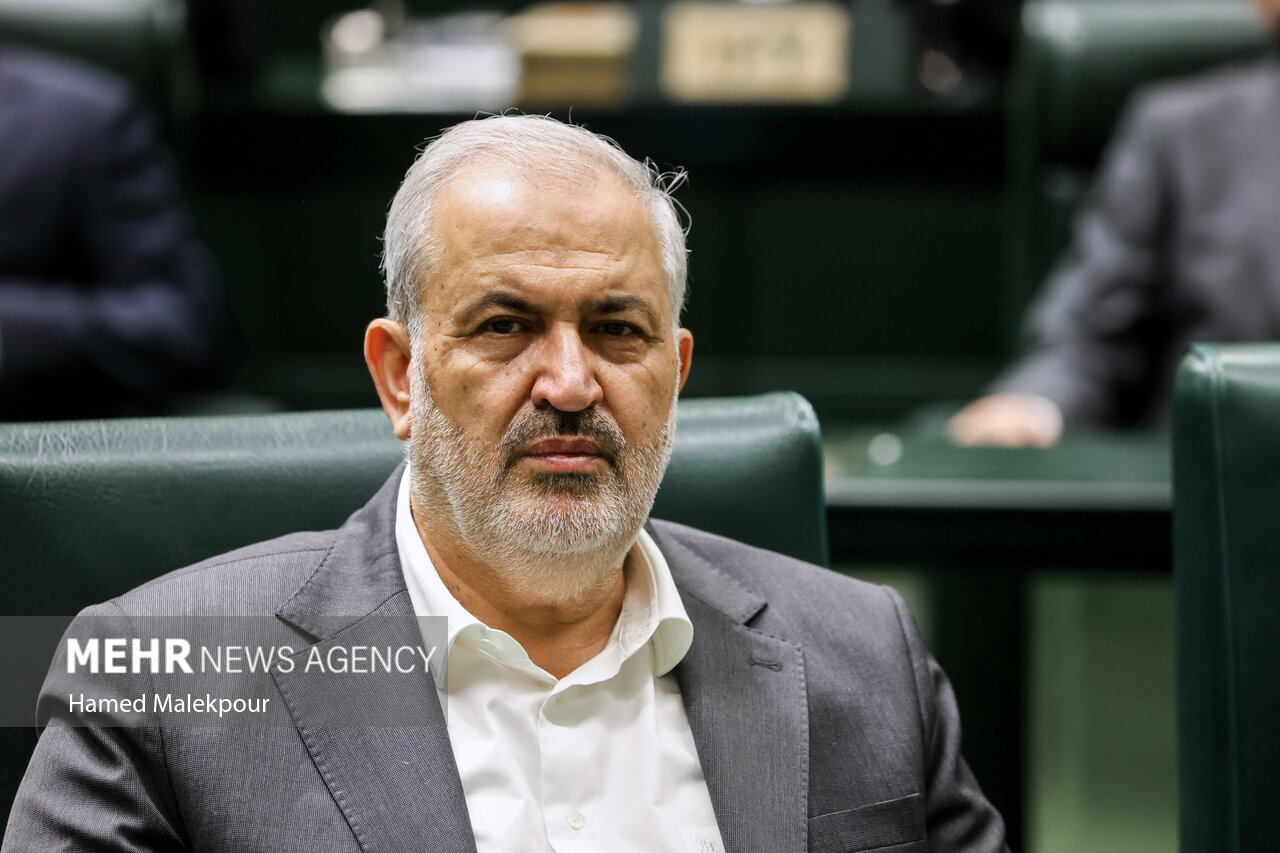
- Aliabadi in 2024
- Military career
- Allegiance: Iran
- Branch: Revolutionary Guards

Minister Energy
- Incumbent
- Assumed office 21 August 2024
- President: Masoud Pezeshkian
- Preceded by: Ali Akbar Mehrabian

Minister of Industry, Mine and Trade
- In office 13 June 2023 – 21 August 2024
- President: Ebrahim Raisi; Mohammad Mokhber (acting)
- Preceded by: Reza Fatemi Amin
- Succeeded by: Mohammad Atabak

Personal details
- Born: 1962 (age 63–64)
- Education: Sharif University of Technology; Tehran University; K. N. Toosi University of Technology

Abbas Aliabadi (Persian: عباس علی‌آبادی; born 1962) is a military officer, university professor and a politician who holds the position of Minister of Energy since 2024. He served as Minister of Industry, Mine and Trade from 2023 to 2024.

== Biography ==
Aliabadi has a bachelor's and master's degree in mechanical engineering with a focus on energy conversion from Sharif University of Technology and Tehran University, and a doctorate in mechanical engineering from K. N. Toosi University of Technology with a focus on control. He is a lecturer of various mechanical engineering courses and topics related to internal combustion engines (gas turbines) in different universities of the country.

Earlier he participated in the implementation and management of Karkheh and Karun 3 power plant projects, executive management of Iran Water and Power Resources Development Company and served as deputy minister of power in electricity and energy affairs.

Among his plans during his tenure as the Deputy Minister of Electrical Affairs of the Ministry of Energy were the use of renewable power plants, realizing the price of electricity and completing half-finished power plants. As Deputy Minister, he had announced that due to the lack of participation of the private sector in the construction of power plants, the government will be active in the construction of the power plant.

He has a background as the president of Malek-Ashtar University of Technology and was the CEO of MAPNA Group from December 2008 to July 2023. Aliabadi's most important action in Mapna was trying to develop this company from power plant projects to other projects. During his time, contracts were signed in the field of oil and gas and the country's railway industries, and he put the entry into the manufacturing of medical devices for health and electric cars on the agenda.

Aliabadi was the nominated as Minister of Industry, Mine and Trade in the Government of Ebrahim Raisi. He received a vote of confidence from the 11th convocation of the Islamic Consultative Assembly (Iranian parliament) on June 23, 2021, with 187 votes in favor, 58 votes against, 8 abstentions and 2 invalid votes. In August 2024 he was appointed as Minister of Energy in the Government of Masoud Pezeshkian.
