= Hamid Chitchian =

Iranian politician (born 1957)

- حمید چیت‌چیان
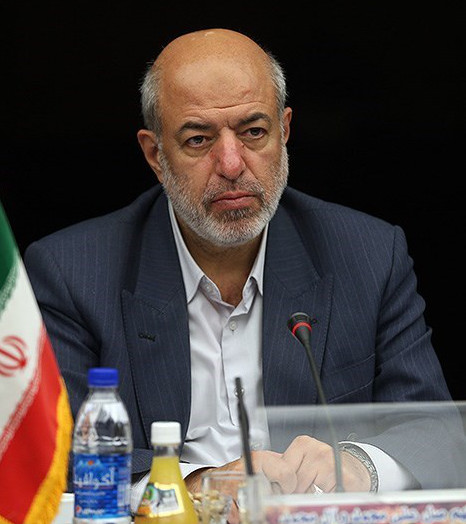
- October 2014

Minister of Energy
- In office 15 August 2013 – 20 August 2017
- President: Hassan Rouhani
- Preceded by: Majid Namjoo
- Succeeded by: Reza Ardakanian

Member of the Iranian Parliament
- In office 28 May 1988 – 28 May 1992
- Constituency: Tabriz, Osku and Azarshahr
- Majority: 308,485 (40.10%)

Personal details
- Born: Hamid Chitchian; 21 March 1957 (age 69) Tabriz, Iran
- Party: Independent
- Education: Amirkabir University of Technology; Tarbiat Modares University
- Profession: Engineer

Military service
- Allegiance: Iran
- Branch/service: Revolutionary Guard
- Years of service: 1980–1988
- Battles/wars: Iran–Iraq War

Hamid Chitchian (Persian: حمید چیت‌چیان, born 21 March 1957) is an Iranian politician and the former intelligence head. He had been energy minister of Iran from 15 August 2013 until 20 August 2017.

== Early life ==
Chitchian was born in Tabriz, East Azerbaijan, around 1957.

== Career ==
Chitchian joined the IRGC and is the former head of its intelligence unit in Tabriz. He is the former member of parliament, serving in the third term. He was appointed deputy energy minister for planning and economic affairs and senior advisor to the energy minister during the first term of the President Mahmoud Ahmedinejad. At the same period he was a member of the managerial board of the Iran Power Generation Transmission and Distribution Management Company (TAVANIR) and the Energy Organization. He was also one of the senior advisors to Ahmedinejad.

He was nominated as energy minister by President Hassan Rouhani on 4 August 2013. On 15 August, he was appointed energy minister to the cabinet of Rouhani, receiving 272 votes in favor and seven votes against in the parliament. It was the second highest level of approval after that for Ali Tayebnia who was appointed economy minister. On 1 August 2017, Chitchian announced that he will leave energy ministry after the end of the first Rouhani government.

== Views ==
Chitchian is a moderate technocratic with a neoliberal economic view.
