= Hossein Dehghan =

Iranian politician and former military officer

Sardar Hossein Dehghan
- حسین دهقان
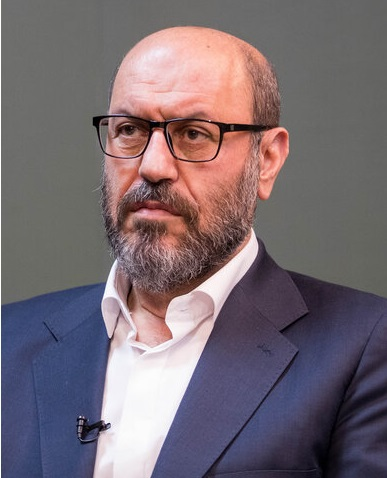
- Dehghan in 2021

Head of the Mostazafan Foundation
- Incumbent
- Assumed office 29 October 2023
- Appointed by: Ali Khamenei
- President: Ebrahim Raisi; Mohammad Mokhber (acting); Masoud Pezeshkian
- Supreme Leader: Ali Khamenei; Mojtaba Khamenei
- Preceded by: Parviz Fattah

Minister of Defence and Armed Forces Logistics
- In office 15 August 2013 – 20 August 2017
- President: Hassan Rouhani
- Deputy: Amir Hatami
- Supreme Leader: Ali Khamenei
- Preceded by: Ahmad Vahidi
- Succeeded by: Amir Hatami

Vice President of Iran Head of Foundation of Martyrs and Veterans Affairs
- In office 8 May 2004 – 17 July 2009
- President: Mohammad Khatami; Mahmoud Ahmadinejad
- Supreme Leader: Ali Khamenei
- Preceded by: Position established
- Succeeded by: Masoud Zaribafan

Deputy Minister of Defence and Armed Forces Logistics
- In office 1997–2003
- President: Mohammad Khatami
- Supreme Leader: Ali Khamenei
- Preceded by: Mohammad Hassan Tolai
- Succeeded by: Seyyed Ali Hosseini Tash

Deputy Chief of Joint Staff of the IRGC
- In office 18 January 1992 – 30 December 1996
- President: Akbar Hashemi Rafsanjani
- Supreme Leader: Ali Khamenei
- Preceded by: Ali Larijani
- Succeeded by: Hossein Nejat

2nd Commander of the IRGC Aerospace Force
- In office 24 April 1990 – 18 January 1992
- President: Akbar Hashemi Rafsanjani
- Supreme Leader: Ali Khamenei
- Preceded by: Mousa Refan
- Succeeded by: Mohammad Hossein Jalali

Deputy Commander of the IRGC Aerospace Force
- In office 17 September 1985 – 24 April 1990
- President: Ali Khamenei; Akbar Hashemi Rafsanjani
- Prime Minister: Mir-Hossein Mousavi
- Supreme Leader: Ruhollah Khomeini; Ali Khamenei
- Preceded by: Office Established
- Succeeded by: Mohsen Ansari

Personal details
- Born: Hossein Dehghani Poudeh; 2 March 1957 (age 69) Pudeh, Isfahan, Imperial State of Iran
- Party: Moderation and Development Party
- Education: University of Tehran
- Awards: Order of Courage (1st class)

Military service
- Allegiance: Iran
- Branch/service: Islamic Revolutionary Guard Corps
- Years of service: 1979–2004; 2013–2017
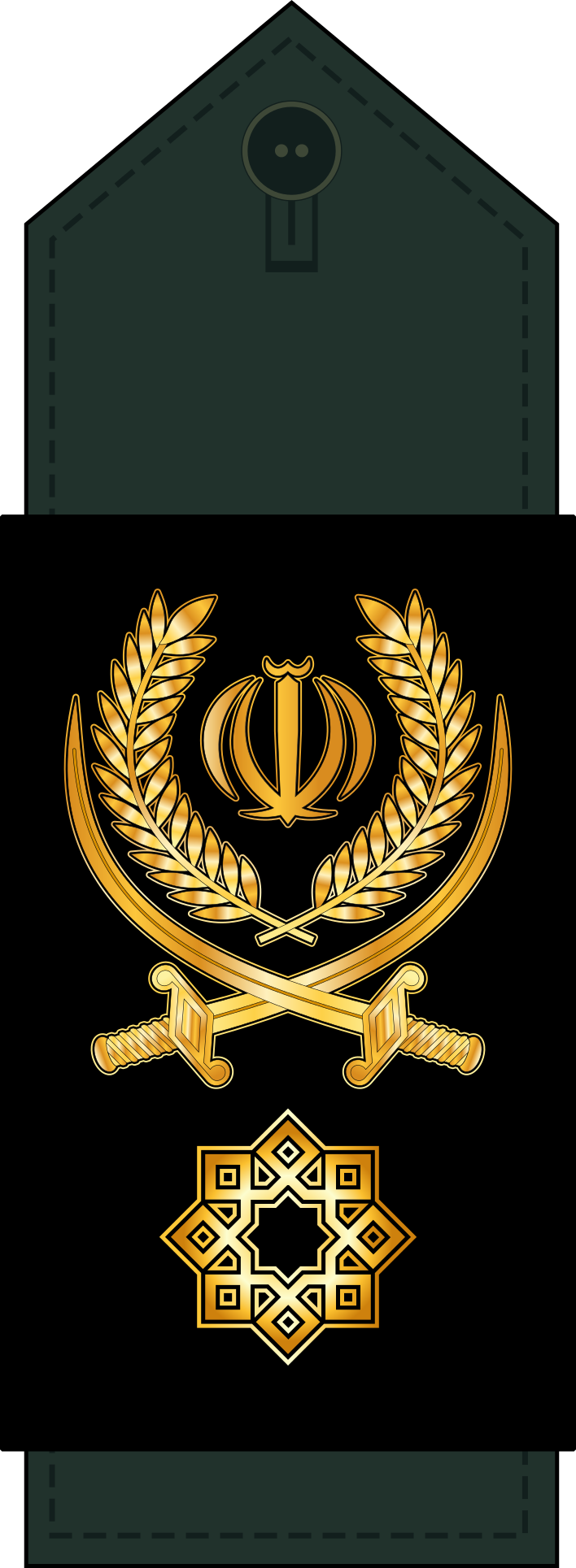
- Rank: Brigadier General
- Battles/wars: Iran–Iraq War; Lebanese Civil War; 1982 Lebanon War; South Lebanon conflict; Syrian civil war; Iranian intervention in the Syria; War in Iraq (2013–2017); Iranian intervention in Iraq

Hossein Dehghani Poudeh (Persian: حسین دهقانی پوده; born 3 March 1957), commonly known as Hossein Dehghan, is an Iranian politician and former military officer. He currently serves as the head of the Mostazafan Foundation since 2023. During the Iranian Revolution, he took part in the occupation of the US embassy in Tehran. As commander of the Iranian Revolutionary Guard Corps forces in Tehran, he oversaw the execution of opponents of the Islamic Republic. He commanded the IRGC forces in Lebanon and was among the orchestrators of the 1983 bombing of the American embassy in Beirut.

He was former minister of defense of Iran that was designated for the position by President Hassan Rouhani on 4 August 2013 and confirmed by the parliament on 15 August. As defense minister he signed a counterterrorism agreement with China. He left the office on 20 August 2017.

== Early life and education ==
Dehghan was born in a village near Shahreza, called Pudeh, Dehaqan County, Isfahan province, in 1957. He received a PhD in management from the University of Tehran.

== Career and activities ==
=== Iranian Revolutionary Guards Corps ===
Dehghan served as a commander in the Iranian Revolutionary Guard Corps (IRGC) and in its air force. During the Islamic revolution, Dehghan took part in the occupation of the US embassy in Tehran. He left his hometown for Tehran and joined the IRGC shortly after the Iranian revolution in 1979. As commander of the IRGC in Tehran he took part and oversaw the suppression and execution of opponents to the newly formed Islamic Republic. His posts at the IRGC include commander of IRGC of Tehran (1980–1982), Isfahan, and Syria and Lebanon (1982–1983), and general manager of the IRGC's Cooperatives Foundation (1996). He was the commander of the IRGC's forces in Lebanon during the 1983 bombing of the American embassy in Beirut, 241 Americans were killed. During his time in Lebanon, he appointed Hezbollah commander Hassan Laqis as his bureau chief. According to Shapira, a scholar who specializes in Hezbollah, Dehghan and Laqis took part in the planning and carrying out of the attack on the US embassy.

During the Iran-Iraq war, he was among the leading and decision-making commanders of the IRGC along with Mohsen Rezaee, Rahim Safavi and Ali Shamkhani. In Syria and Lebanon he was the commander of the training corps of the IRGC. He was named the IRGC's air force deputy commander in 1986 and became its commander in April 1990. His tenure lasted until 1992. He was replaced by Mohammad Hossein Jalali in the post. Dehghani was named deputy chief of the IRGC Joint Staff in 1992. He later was promoted to the rank of brigadier general.

=== Political career and other activities ===
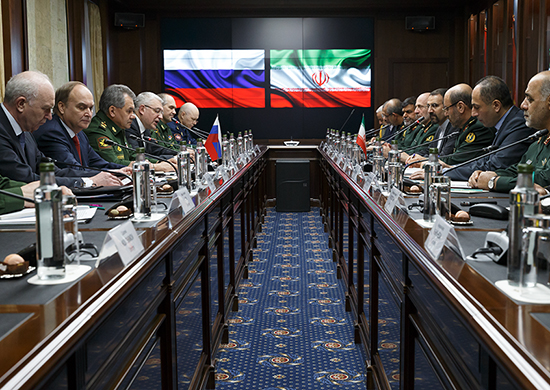
Dehghan with Russian Defense Minister Sergey Shoygu, 16 February 2016

Next he served as deputy to the then defense minister, Ali Shamkhani, during the presidency of Mohammad Khatami from 1997 to 2003. In 2003, he held the post of acting defense minister. He was made Vice President of Iran and head of the martyrs foundation, "Bonyad Shahid", in 2005 and served as its president until July 2009. In addition, he served as an advisor to the former President Mahmoud Ahmedinejad. From 2009 to 2010 he was the deputy to Ali Shamkhani in the Armed Forces Strategic Studies Center. Then he was appointed secretary of the Expediency Council's political, defense and security committee in 2010. He also served as an advisor to Speaker of Parliament Ali Larijani and Tehran Mayor Mohammad Bagher Qalibaf. However, Dehghani distanced himself from Ahmedinejad in 2012 and joined Moderation and Development Party led by Hassan Rouhani.

He was nominated to head the defense ministry on 4 August 2013. He was approved by the Majlis and replaced Ahmad Vahidi in the post. Dehghani received 269 votes in favor and 10 votes against. Former Oil Minister Rostam Qasemi was named as Dehghani's advisor on 22 August.

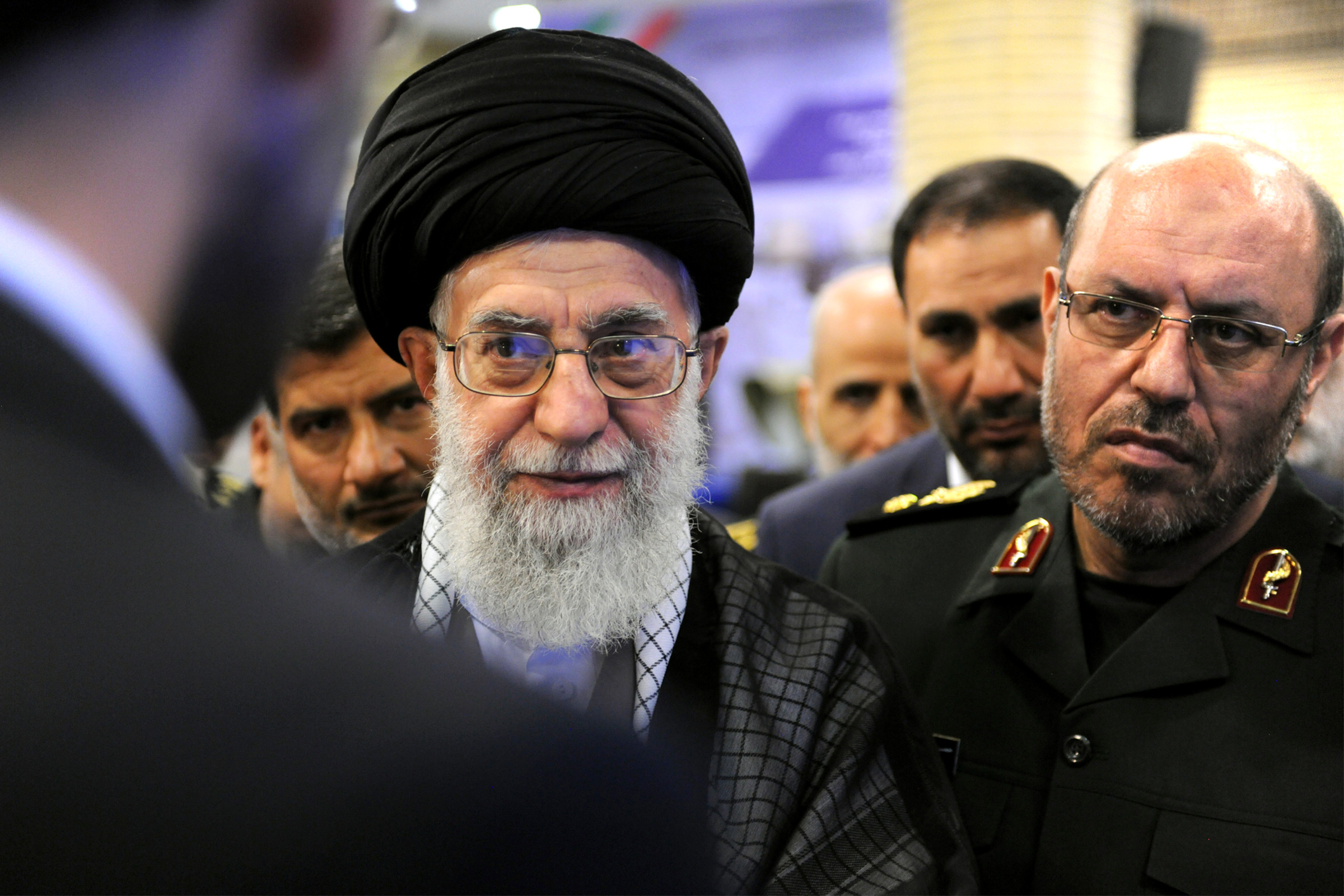
Dehghan with Supreme Leader Ali Khamenei, 2016

He was a known hardliner and close to Supreme Leader Ayatollah Ali Khamenei. In 2016, Dehghan advanced and signed a counterterrorism agreement with China. That same year, he negotiated an arms deal with Russia and refused to respond when parliament questioned about details on Iran's military cooperation as Russia conducted fly missions over Syria from Iran. This move was met with opposition by Larijani who accused Dehghan of "disrespecting parliament". Later, he announced to cut military cooperation with Russia. Dehghan also threatened to conduct military action against Saudi Arabia, except for holy places, if it did anything "ignorant".

On 1 August 2017, Dehghan announced that he would leave the defense ministry after the end of the first Rouhani government. He served as an advisor to Ali Khamenei. After the assassination of Qasem Soleimani and before Operation Martyr Soleimani, Ali Khamenei, along with Dehghan as his chief military advisor, had made preparations to strike US forces back as revenge. In a CNN interview, Dehghan expressed that the "only thing that can end this period of war is for the Americans to receive a blow that is equal to the blow they have inflicted" while ensuring to target US military bases.

He announced that he was running in the 2021 Iranian presidential election. Many critics opposed his candidacy, warning that it would lead to increasing military interventions within Iran's political structure.

During the 2026 Iran war it was reported he was a candidate to be the new intelligence minister, but under direct pressure from the IRGC, his nomination was rejected, as Vahidi insists the IRGC decide about all critical and sensitive leadership positions. On 19 March 2026 Iran International reported that he became the Secretary of the Supreme National Security Council, which later came out as false, when Mohammad Bagher Zolghadr became the Secretary of the Supreme National Security Council on the 24 March 2026. Iran International corrected it later.

== Mostazafan Foundation ==
Under the leadership of Dehghan, the foundation faced criticism and accusations over the sale of the Parsian Hotels Group, a key asset of the foundation. Ali Khazrian, a member of Parliament, raised concerns about the buyer's qualifications and the unusually low sale price, calling for a thorough investigation into the deal. The foundation has been under U.S. sanctions since 2020, Partially due to its use of economic influence to support the regime's agenda.

== Sanctions ==
In November 2019, Dehghan was among many Iranian officials placed under the sanctions list by the United States Department of State due to his involvement as an IRGC commander in the 1983 Beirut barracks bombings which alleged Hezbollah militants killed 241 American soldiers.

== Political views ==
In 2020, Dehghan stated he is not part of any specific political faction stating: "I neither one of Ahmadinejad’s men nor…Khatami's."

Before announcing his candidacy for the 2021 Iranian presidential election, Dehghan worked to increase his presence in Iranian politics by connecting with key conservative religious leaders including Ahmad Alamolhoda, who opposed Hassan Rouhani’s foreign policy towards Washington.

=== US and Europe ===
In an interview with The Guardian as an Iranian presidential candidate in 2021, Dehghan accused the US of being untrustworthy, claiming that the policies of the Biden and Trump administration are similar by "not lifting the oppressive sanctions against Iranian people and "continuing to block Iran oil revenue in foreign banks while we need the money to fight against the coronavirus pandemic." He further added that all of these are a continuation of Trumpism. He also dismissed Europe's role as a mediator between Iran and the US stating that it had "no independent stance from America".

=== Nuclear program ===
During his time as defence minister, Dehghan consistently maintained his opposition of including Iran's nuclear program in international negotiations. In 2017, he dismissed the United Nations' concern of Iran violating the Iran nuclear deal during a missile test and said that Iran would "not allow foreigners to interfere in our defence affairs".

Military offices
Preceded by Ali Larijani	Deputy Chief of the Joint Staff of the IRGC; 1992–30 December 1996	Succeeded by Hossein Nejat
Preceded by Akbar Rafan	Commander of the Revolutionary Guards Air Force; 24 April 1990 – 18 January 1992	Succeeded by Mohammad Hossein Jalali
