= Parviz Fattah =

Iranian politician

Seyyed Parviz Fattah
- پرویز فتاح
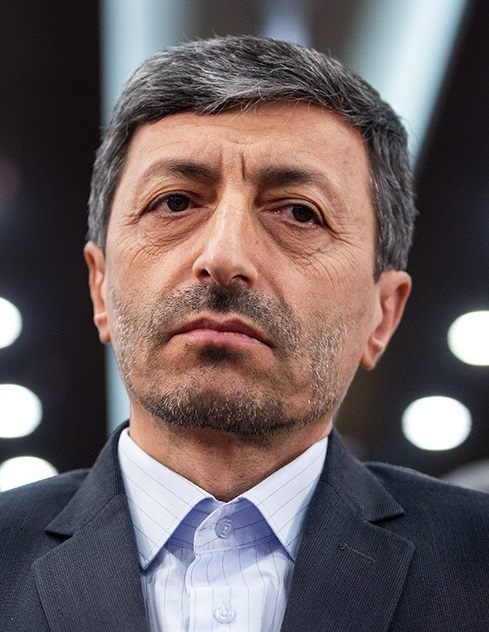

Head of the Execution of Imam Khomeini's Order
- Incumbent
- Assumed office 29 October 2023
- Appointed by: Ali Khamenei
- Preceded by: Mohammad Mokhber Aref Norouzi (acting)

Head of the Mostazafan Foundation
- In office 22 July 2019 – 29 October 2023
- Appointed by: Ali Khamenei
- Preceded by: Mohammad Saeedikia
- Succeeded by: Hossein Dehghan

Head of the Imam Khomeini Relief Foundation
- In office 5 April 2015 – 21 July 2019
- Appointed by: Ali Khamenei
- Preceded by: Hossein Anvari
- Succeeded by: Morteza Bakhtiari

Minister of Energy
- In office 24 August 2005 – 3 September 2009
- President: Mahmoud Ahmadinejad
- Preceded by: Habibollah Bitaraf
- Succeeded by: Majid Namjoo

Personal details
- Born: Parviz Fattah Gharabaghi c. 1961 (age 64–65) Qarah Bagh, Urmia, Iran
- Party: Front of Islamic Revolution Stability
- Children: 2
- Education: Sharif University of Technology; Amirkabir University of Technology; Imam Hussein University

Military service
- Allegiance: Iran
- Branch/service: Revolutionary Guards
- Years of service: 1980–2005; 2009–2015
- Unit: Khatam-al Anbiya Headquarters
- Commands: Cooperation Bonyad
- Battles/wars: Iran–Iraq War

Parviz Fattah Gharabaghi (Persian: پرویز فتاح قره‌باغی) is an Iranian conservative politician and former member of the Revolutionary Guard. He has been head of the Execution of Imam Khomeini's Order since 2023.

He was minister of energy in Mahmoud Ahmadinejad's first cabinet from 2005 to 2009. He was head of the Imam Khomeini Relief Foundation from 2015 to 2019 and head of the Mostazafan Foundation from 2019 to 2023.

== Early life and education ==
Born in Urmia in 1961, he has the license of civil engineering from Sharif University of Technology, a master's degree in systems engineering from Amirkabir University of Technology in Tehran and PhD from Imam Hossein University in Tehran.

== Career ==
Fattah was appointed energy minister in 2005 and approved by the Majlis with 194 votes in favor. He was in office until 2009. He then became the executive director of Bonyad Taavon Sepah, which is the IRGC's cooperative foundation. He was also named deputy commander of the IRGC's construction body, Khatam al-Anbiya Construction Headquarters.

== Activities ==
During his leadership of the Mostazafan Foundation, Parviz Fattah oversaw several infrastructure projects, notably the opening of Lot 2 of the Tehran–Shomal Freeway—a 15.5 km section—in July 2023, which reduced the travel distance between Tehran and the northern regions. He was also involved in the construction and operation of the Alborz Tunnel and other return routes within the same freeway section.

In the fields of social welfare and housing, Fattah directed resources toward the National Housing Movement, including allocating land for housing projects. He also announced plans to provide 14,000 houses to households with two disabled members through the foundation’s programs.

In July 2019, Fattah was appointed head of the Execution of Imam Khomeini's Order (EIKO). During his tenure, Setad implemented housing and welfare programs, including contributions to the National Housing Movement and assistance for low-income households. The organization also played a role in Iran’s COVID-19 response by funding medical supplies and supporting vaccination campaigns.

=== Sanctions ===
The US Treasury Department put sanctions on Fattah in December 2010 due to his activities in the Bonyad Taavon Sepah that provides services to the IRGC. He was also sanctioned by the U.S. Treasury in November 2020 for his connections to Supreme Leader Ali Khamenei.

Political offices
Preceded by Habibollah Bitaraf	Minister of Energy of Iran; 2005–2009	Succeeded by Majid Namjoo
