= Musaabad Rural District =

Rural district in Isfahan province, Iran

Musaabad Rural District Persian: دهستان موسي آباد
- Rural District
- Location within Iran
- Coordinates: 31°55′N 51°41′E
- Country: Iran
- Province: Isfahan
- County: Dehaqan
- District: Central
- Established: 1987
- Capital: Golshan

Population (2016)
  - Total: 1,073
- Time zone: UTC+3:30 (IRST)

Musaabad Rural District (Persian: دهستان موسي آباد) is in the Central District of Dehaqan County, (Note: Formerly Semirom-e Sofla County) Isfahan province, Iran. It is administered from the city of Golshan. (Note: Formerly the village of Musaabad)

== Demographics ==
=== Population ===
At the time of the 2006 National Census, the rural district's population was 5,989 in 1,732 households. There were 1,577 inhabitants in 425 households at the following census of 2011. The 2016 census measured the population of the rural district as 1,073 in 340 households. The most populous of its 25 villages was Mahmudabad, with 342 people.

=== Other villages in the rural district ===
- Aliabad-e Gachi
- Kareh
- Laricheh
