= Reza Ardakanian =

Iranian professor and politician (b. 1958)

- رضا اردکانیان
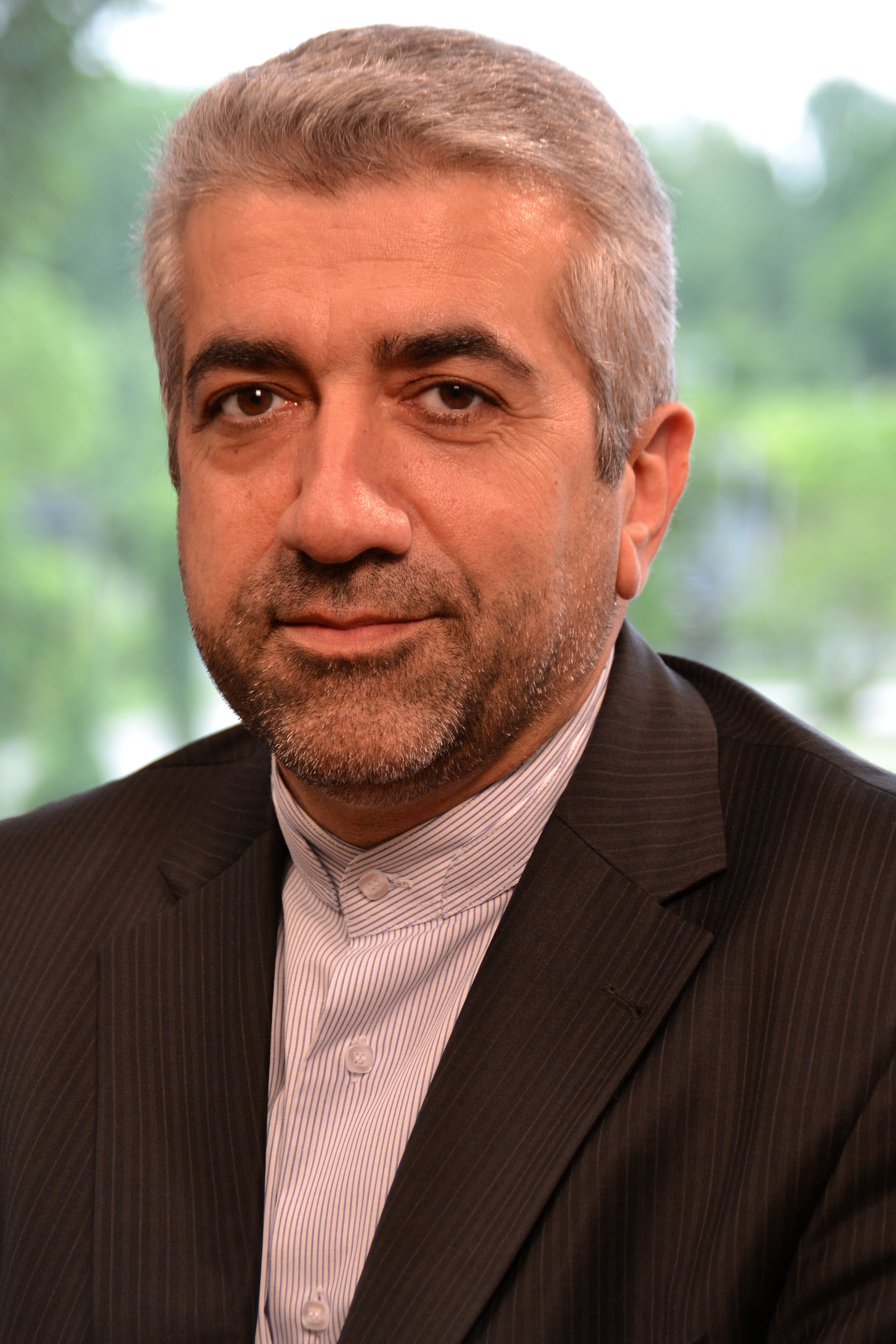

Minister of Energy
- In office 29 October 2017 – 25 August 2021
- President: Hassan Rouhani
- Preceded by: Hamid Chitchian
- Succeeded by: Ali Akbar Mehrabian

Personal details
- Born: 1958 (age 67–68) Yazd, Imperial State of Iran
- Education: Sharif University; McMaster University
- Website: www.ardakanian.net

Reza Ardakanian (Persian: رضا اردکانیان; born 1958) is an Iranian professor, politician and former Minister of Energy of Iran, a position he had held from 29 October 2017 to 25 August 2021. He was previously deputy energy minister in the 1980s and 1990s and has been involved with UN-Water.

Reza Ardakanian is the Founding Director of the United Nations University Institute for Integrated Management of Material Fluxes and of Resources (UNU-FLORES) since 2012. He is the co-ordinator of the UN-Water Task Force on planning and organization of the new Water Decade (2018–2028). Prior to establishing the UNU-FLORES, he established another six international and national entities. He served as Director of the UN-Water Decade Programme on Capacity Development (UNW-DPC) from 2007 to 2015 and as ad interim Vice-Rector of the United Nations University (UNU) in Europe from 2009 to 2011. During his tenure as the senior official at the United Nations, his leadership contributed largely to the implementation of the MDGs and the SDGs, especially on global capacity development. He has been on the boards of various international programmes/organizations such as the UNESCO International Hydrological Programme, the UNESCO Institute for Water Education, the International Hydropower Association, and the United Nations University Institute for Environment and Human Security (UNU-EHS). Prior to his international commitments, Ardakanian held a number of national offices in Iran, including Deputy Minister for Water Affairs (2001–2005), Senior Vice-Minister (1998–2001) and Deputy Minister for Planning & Economic Affairs (1989–1991) with the Ministry of Energy, and Deputy Minister for Urban Development and Municipalities with the Ministry of Interior (1987–1989).

Ardakanian was co-opted Professor at the Technische Universität Dresden in Dresden, Germany and is a faculty member of Sharif University of Technology in Tehran, Iran. He holds a PhD in Water Resources Management from McMaster University in Hamilton, Canada.

== Early career ==
At the national level, Reza Ardakanian has served as the Deputy Minister for Urban Development (1987–89) in the Ministry of Interior, Deputy Minister for Planning (1989–91), the First Deputy Minister (1998–2001), and Deputy Minister for Water Affairs (2001–2005) in the Ministry of Energy of Iran. During the latter period, he also served as the General Manager of the National Water Resources Management Company, in charge of constructing/operating of large dams, irrigation networks, and hydropower plants.

== Academic career ==
Ardakanian is a water scientist with a PhD in Water Resources Management from McMaster University, Canada. He has published his academic contributions in a number of books, journal articles and working papers. He is co-opted professor at the Technische Universität Dresden and a faculty member of the Sharif University of Technology since 1998 and supervised 15 PhD and MSc students. He served as Director-in-charge of the Iran Water Resources Research Editorial Board, a member of the Board of Trustees of the university from 1999 to 2006. He has authored, co-authored, and edited over 100 publications, including books, journal papers, research reports, lecture notes, and articles for the media.

== Political career ==
=== United Nations career ===
Reza Ardakanian is the founding Director (2012 to present) of the United Nations University Institute for Integrated Management of Material Fluxes and of Resources (UNU-FLORES). He established the institute with the strategic focus on the Nexus of Water, Soil and Waste in Dresden, Germany and ensured its funding sustainability. He established a joint PhD programme in Integrated Management of Water, Soil and Waste with the Technische Universität Dresden. He successfully led the organization of the Dresden Nexus Conference (DNC) in 2015 and 2017 linking experts in the area of water, soil and waste from the UN system organizations, international organizations, UN Member States, universities and research institutions as well as individuals to collectively make contributions to the optimization of the innovative usage of the environmental resources. The UNU-FLORES is now a true think tank to the UN Member States who seek innovative solutions towards the integrated management of water, soil and waste. The institute has delivered research projects concerning China, Tanzania, Mozambique and Germany etc. Furthermore, he and his team contribute significantly in the internationalization of scientific activities in Dresden. Ardakanian was appointed as Co-coordinator of the UN-Water Task Force on planning and organization of the new Water Decade (2018–2028) and is the deputy UNU Representative to the UN-Water.

Prior to his tenure at UNU-FLORES, Ardakanian led the United Nations University Vice Rectorate in Europe (UNU-ViE) as Vice Rector in Europe a.i. (2009–2011) overseeing the operation of the UNU offices in Bonn, Germany.

As Founding Director (2007–2015) of the UN-Water Decade Programme on Capacity Development (UNW-DPC), Reza Ardakanian successfully established the programme and led the team towards achieving notable results and making significant contributions in the realm of capacity development on water topics. During his directorship, the team organized 128 global capacity development workshops and developed capacity for 2334 relevant professionals from 151 countries. He also led the development and launch of the UN-Water Activity Information System (UNW-AIS).

In addition to his leadership at various UN offices and programmes, Reza Ardakanian served as board member to a number of UN entities and international institutions including United Nations University Institute for Environment and Human Security (UNU-EHS) (2003–2007), the bureau of the UNESCO International Hydrological Programme (UNESO-IHP) (2000-2002） and the UNESCO Institute for Water Education (UNESCO-IHE) (2003–2007). He also was on the Managing Board of the International Hydropower Association in London (2004–2006)and the Czechglobe Global Change Research Institute (2016–present). He was Founding Director of RCUWM, a UNESCO regional centre on urban water management based in Tehran (2002–2007) and co-founder of the Center for Qanats and Historic Hydraulic Structures under auspices of UNESCO in Yazd, Iran (2005).

=== Energy Minister ===
Ardakanian was nominated as Energy minister by President Hassan Rouhani on 15 October 2017. He was confirmed by the Parliament on 29 October with 225 yes votes.
