= Ministry of Energy (Iran) =

Government ministry of Iran

Coordinates: 35°46′24.11″N 51°24′25.42″E

- وزارت نيرو; Vezârat-e Niru

- Flag of the Ministry of Energy

Agency overview
- Formed: 3 December 1936; 89 years ago
- Jurisdiction: Government of the Islamic Republic of Iran
- Headquarters: Tehran, Iran
- Employees: 34,181 (2019)
- Minister responsible: Abbas Aliabadi
- Website: Official Website

The Ministry of Energy (Persian: وزارت نیرو Vezârat-e Niru) regulates and manages the implementation of policies applicable to energy, electricity, water, and wastewater services in Iran.

== History and profile ==
Developed on 17 October 1936 (before the current constitution of Iran (1979)), the ministry was established to provide electricity to the city of Tehran. On 20 May 1943 (before the current constitution of Iran (1979)), its portfolio was expanded to include water management in the country. It was later renamed as the ministry of water and electricity on 17 March 1964. Later on 17 February 1975, after the parliamentary approval it became the Ministry of Energy. On 10 May 1978, under energy minister Jahanguir Mahdmina, the ministry's function was expanded to contain the construction and operation of nuclear power plants in the country.

After the new Iranian constitution was formed (1979) some parliamentary changes took place for the duties of this ministry. On 12 July 1980, some of the functions of the ministry were given to the ministry of agriculture. On 7 March 1983, water management, and fair distribution of water resources were made part of the ministry of energy.

The Ministry of Energy is responsible for the management of supply and regulating the demand for water, electricity, energy, and wastewater services. It also promotes goods and services training, research and technological advancement, and rooting. The Ministry also plays a major role in the preservation of natural resources in Iran, environmental science, public health promotion, welfare, and self-sufficiency for sustainable development of the country.

The ministry has been on the sanction list of the European Union since 16 October 2012.

== Deputies ==
The ministry consists of five deputy Ministers as follows:

- Deputy for Research and Human Resources
- Deputy for Planning and Economic Affairs
- Deputy for Electricity and Energy
- Deputy for Water and Wastewater
- Deputy for Support, Legal, and Parliamentary Affairs

== Ministers since 1979 ==
The last energy minister before the 1979 Iranian revolution was Jahanguir Mahdmina.

The energy ministers of Iran after the 1979 Iranian revolution:

No.	Portrait	Name	Took office	Left office	Party	Head of government
1	Not an image	Abbas Taj	18 February 1979	5 November 1979	Independent	Mehdi Bazargan
2	Not an image	Hassan Abbaspour	17 November 1979	28 June 1981	Islamic Republican Party	Council of the Islamic Revolution Mohammad-Ali Rajai
3		Hassan Ghafourifard	17 August 1981	28 October 1985	Islamic Coalition Party	Mohammad-Javad Bahonar Mohammad-Reza Mahdavi Kani (acting)
3		Hassan Ghafourifard	17 August 1981	28 October 1985	Islamic Coalition Party	Mir-Hossein Mousavi
4	Not an image	Mohammad Taghi Banki	28 October 1985	13 June 1987	Islamic Coalition Party	Mir-Hossein Mousavi
5		Bijan Zangeneh	20 September 1988	20 August 1997	Independent	Mir-Hossein Mousavi
5		Bijan Zangeneh	20 September 1988	20 August 1997	Independent	Mir-Hossein Mousavi Akbar Hashemi Rafsanjani
6	Not an image	Habibollah Bitaraf	20 August 1997	24 August 2005	Islamic Iran Participation Front	Mohammad Khatami
7		Parviz Fattah	24 August 2005	3 September 2009		Mahmoud Ahmadinejad
8		Majid Namjoo	15 November 2009	15 August 2013		Mahmoud Ahmadinejad
9		Hamid Chitchian	15 August 2013	20 August 2017		Hassan Rouhani
10		Reza Ardakanian	29 October 2017	25 August 2021		Hassan Rouhani
11		Ali Akbar Mehrabian	25 August 2021	21 August 2024		Ebrahim Raisi
12		Abbas Aliabadi	21 August 2024			Masoud Pezeshkian

== See also ==
- Energy in Iran
- List of reservoirs and dams in Iran
- Water supply and sanitation in Iran
- List of power stations in Iran
