= Dehaqan =

City in Isfahan province, Iran

Dehaqan Persian: دهاقان
- City
- Location within Iran
- Coordinates: 31°56′19″N 51°38′51″E
- Country: Iran
- Province: Isfahan
- County: Dehaqan
- District: Central

Population (2016)
  - Total: 17,945
- Time zone: UTC+3:30 (IRST)

Dehaqan (Persian: دهاقان) (Note: Also romanized as Dehāqān) is a city in the Central District of Dehaqan County, (Note: Formerly Semirom-e Sofla County) Isfahan province, Iran, serving as capital of both the county and the district.

== Demographics ==
=== Population ===
At the time of the 2006 National Census, the city's population was 16,899 in 4,664 households. The following census in 2011 counted 17,108 people in 5,244 households. The 2016 census measured the population of the city as 17,945 people in 5,790 households.

== Overview ==
The town consists of the old town, Nehzat Abad neighbourhood and Ata Abad (now part of the town). The old town itself consists of many neighborhoods, such as Melle Now (Mahalle Now), Posht Gombezi, Ghale, etc. ...

Dehaqan is located at 30 km from Shahreza city. The word "Dehaqan" originated from "Dehaq" which means "Watery Place or "Dehqan" which means "farmers".

The climatic condition of this city is divided into:

1. North and east zone, which experience semi-dry climate, suitable for agronomy and animal husbandry activities.
2. South and west zone, which has mountain climate and green hills, suitable for green house activities.

Local fruits include pears and walnuts. There are so many springs(streams) around it, including at Cheshme Benoy. Its water is mineral and very tasty. In winter there is a place for skiing which is a common destination for people in Isfahan province. In the first month of spring a flower grows there which is called Lalehye wajgoon (upside down tulip). There are two universities in Dehaghan including: Payame Noor University Dehaghan Branch and Islamic Azad University Dehaghan Branch.
