= Central District (Dehaqan County) =

District in Isfahan province, Iran

Central District (Dehaqan County) Persian: بخش مرکزی شهرستان دهاقان
- District
- Location within Iran
- Coordinates: 32°01′N 51°36′E
- Country: Iran
- Province: Isfahan
- County: Dehaqan
- Established: 2003
- Capital: Dehaqan

Population (2016)
  - Total: 34,511
- Time zone: UTC+3:30 (IRST)

The Central District of Dehaqan County (Note: Formerly Semirom-e Sofla County) (Persian: بخش مرکزی شهرستان دهاقان) is in Isfahan province, Iran. Its capital is the city of Dehaqan.

== History ==
In 2003, Semirom-e Sofla District was separated from Shahreza County in the establishment of Semirom-e Sofla County, which was renamed Dehaqan County in 2008. In 2010, the village of Musaabad was converted to a city and renamed Golshan after merging with two other villages.

== Demographics ==
=== Population ===
At the time of the 2006 National Census, the district's population was 34,149 in 9,550 households. The following census in 2011 counted 34,844 people in 10,602 households. The 2016 census measured the population of the district as 34,511 inhabitants in 11,118 households.

=== Administrative divisions ===
Central District (Dehaqan County) Population
| Administrative Divisions | 2006 | 2011 | 2016 |
|---|---|---|---|
| Hamgin RD | 4,695 | 4,708 | 4,250 |
| Musaabad RD | 5,989 | 1,577 | 1,073 |
| Qombovan RD | 6,566 | 6,393 | 5,806 |
| Dehaqan (city) | 16,899 | 17,108 | 17,945 |
| Golshan (city) (Note: Musaabad merged with two other villages to become a city) | | 5,058 | 5,437 |
| Total | 34,149 | 34,844 | 34,511 |
RD = Rural District
