= Dehaqan County =

County in Isfahan province, Iran

Dehaqan County Persian: شهرستان دهاقان
- County
- Location of Dehaqan County in Isfahan province (bottom left, pink)

- Location of Isfahan province in Iran
- Coordinates: 32°01′N 51°36′E
- Country: Iran
- Province: Isfahan
- Established: 2003
- Capital: Dehaqan
- Districts: Central

Population (2016)
  - Total: 34,511
- Time zone: UTC+3:30 (IRST)

Dehaqan County (Persian: شهرستان دهاقان) (Note: Formerly Semirom-e Sofla County (شهرستان سميرم سفلي)) is in Isfahan province, Iran. Its capital is the city of Dehaqan.

== History ==
In 2003, Semirom-e Sofla District was separated from Shahreza County in the establishment of Semirom-e Sofla County, which was renamed Dehaqan County in 2008. In 2010, the village of Musaabad was converted to a city and renamed Golshan after merging with two other villages.

== Demographics ==
=== Population ===
At the time of the 2006 census, the county's population was 34,149 in 9,550 households. The following census in 2011 counted 34,844 people in 10,602 households. The 2016 census measured the population of the county as 34,511 in 11,118 households.

=== Administrative divisions ===
Dehaqan County's population history and administrative structure over three consecutive censuses are shown in the following table.

Dehaqan County Population
Administrative Divisions	2006	2011	2016
Central District	34,149	34,844	34,511
Hamgin RD	4,695	4,708	4,250
Musaabad RD	5,989	1,577	1,073
Qombovan RD	6,566	6,393	5,806
Dehaqan (city)	16,899	17,108	17,945
Golshan (city) (Note: Musaabad merged with two other villages to become a city)		5,058	5,437
Total	34,149	34,844	34,511
RD = Rural District

== See also ==
Media related to Dehaqan County at Wikimedia Commons
