= Presidency of Mohammad Khatami =

Iranian presidential administration from 1997 to 2005

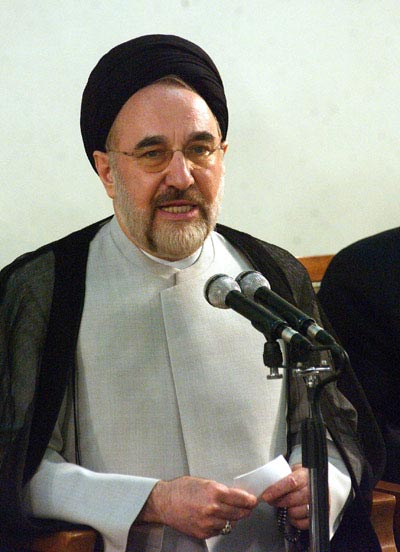
- Khatami in 2005
- Khatami in 2005; 3 August 1997 – 3 August 2005
- Vice President: Hassan Habibi, Mohammad Reza Aref
- Cabinet: First cabinet, Second cabinet
- Party: Reformists (Combatant Clerics)
- Election: 1997; 2001
- Seat: Pasteur St. Building
- Seal of the president

Mohammad Khatami's tenure as the 5th president of Iran began with his inauguration on 3 August 1997 until he left office on 3 August 2005.

== Khatami's Presidency ==
Running on a reform agenda, Khatami was elected president on 23 May 1997 in what many have described as a remarkable election. Voter turnout was nearly 80%. Despite limited television airtime, most of which went to conservative Speaker of Parliament and favored candidate Ali Akbar Nateq-Nouri, Khatami received 70 percent of the vote. "Even in Qom, the center of theological training in Iran and a conservative stronghold, 70% of voters cast their ballots for Khatami." He was re-elected on June 8, 2001 for a second term and stepped down on 3 August 2005 after serving his maximum two consecutive terms according to the Islamic Republic's constitution.

Khatami supporters have been described as a "coalition of strange bedfellows, including traditional leftists, ... business leaders who wanted the state to open up the economy and allow more foreign investment" and "women and younger voters."

The day of his election, the 2nd of Khordad, 1376, in the Iranian calendar, is regarded as the starting date of "reforms" in Iran. His followers are therefore usually known as the "2nd of Khordad Movement".

Khatami is regarded as Iran's first reformist president, since the focus of his campaign was on the rule of law, democracy and the inclusion of all Iranians in the political decision-making process. However, his policies of reform led to repeated clashes with the hardline and conservative Islamists in the Iranian government, who control powerful governmental organizations like the Guardian Council, whose members are appointed by the Supreme Leader. Khatami lost most of those clashes, and by the end of his presidency many of his followers had grown disillusioned with him.

As President, according to the Iranian political system, Khatami was outranked by the Supreme Leader. Thus, Khatami had no legal authority over key state institutions: the armed forces, the police, the army, the revolutionary guards, the state radio and television, the prisons, etc. (See Politics of Iran).

Khatami presented the so-called "twin bills" to the parliament during his term in office, these two pieces of proposed legislation would have introduced small but key changes to the national election laws of Iran and also presented a clear definition of the president's power to prevent constitutional violations by state institutions. Khatami himself described the "twin bills" as the key to the progress of reforms in Iran. The bills were approved by the parliament but were eventually vetoed by the Guardian Council.

=== Economic policy ===
Khatami's economic policies followed the previous government's commitment to industrialization. At a macro-economic level, Khatami continued most of the liberal policies that Rafsanjani had embarked on in the state's first five-year economic development plan (1990–1995). On April 10, 2005 Khatami cited economic development, large-scale operations of the private sector in the country's economic arena and the six percent economic growth as among the achievements of his government. He allocated $5 billion to the private sector for promoting the economy, adding that the value of contracts signed in this regard has reached $10 billion. Khatami mixed economic liberalism and neoliberalism with economic populism, while Khatami embraced some capitalist economic policies, he was critical of capitalism.

A year into his first term as president of Iran, Khatami acknowledged Iran's economic challenges, stating that the economy was, "chronically ill ... and it will continue to be so unless there is fundamental restructuring."

For much of his first term, Khatami saw through the implementation of Iran's second five-year development plan. On 15 September 1999, Khatami presented a new five-year plan to the Majlis. Aimed at the period from 2000 to 2004, the plan called for economic reconstruction in a broader context of social and political development. The specific economic reforms included "an ambitious program to privatize several major industries ... the creation of 750,000 new jobs per year, average annual real GDP growth of six percent over the period, reduction in subsidies for basic commodities ... plus a wide range of fiscal and structural reforms." Unemployment remained a major problem, with Khatami's five-year plan lagging behind in job creation. Only 300,000 new jobs were created in the first year of the plan, well short of the 750,000 that the plan called for. The 2004 World Bank report on Iran concludes that "after 24 years marked by internal post-revolutionary strife, international isolation, and deep economic volatility, Iran is slowly emerging from a long period of uncertainty and instability."

At the macroeconomic level, real GDP rose from 2.4 percent in 1997 to 5.9 percent in 2000. Unemployment was reduced from 16.2 percent of the labor force to less than 14 percent. The consumer price index fell to less than 13 percent from more than 17 percent. Both public and private investments increased in the energy sector, the building industry, and other sectors of the country's industrial base. The country's external debt was cut from $12.1 billion to $7.9 billion, its lowest level since the Iran-Iraq cease-fire. The World Bank granted $232 million for health and sewage projects after a hiatus of about seven years. The government, for the first time since the 1979 wholesale financial nationalization, authorized the establishment of two private banks and one private insurance company. The OECD lowered the risk factor for doing business in Iran to four from six (on a scale of seven).

The government's own figures put the number of people under the absolute poverty line in 2001 at 15.5 percent of the total population — down from 18 percent in 1997, and those under relative poverty at 25 percent, thus classifying some 40 percent of the people as poor. Private estimates indicate higher figures.

Among 155 countries in a 2001 world survey, Iran under Khatami was 150th in terms of openness to the global economy. On the United Nations' Human Development scale, Iran ranked 90th out of 162 countries, only slightly better than its previous position at 97 out of 175 countries four years earlier. The overall risk of doing business in Iran improved only marginally from "D" to "C."

=== Foreign policy ===
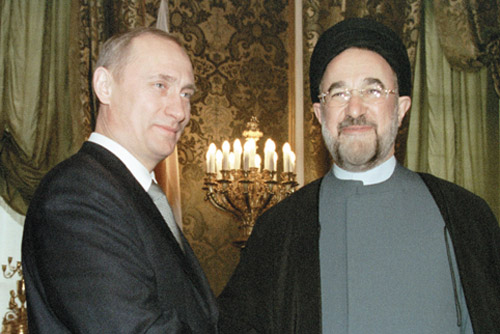
Vladimir Putin, president of Russia meeting Khatami in Sa'd Abad Palace.

During Khatami's presidency, Iran's foreign policy began a process of moving from confrontation to conciliation. In Khatami's notion of foreign policy, there was no "clash of civilizations", he favoured instead a "dialogue among civilizations". Relations with the US remained marred by mutual suspicion and distrust, but during Khatami's two terms, Tehran increasingly made efforts to play a greater role in the Persian Gulf region and beyond.

As President, Khatami met with many influential figures including Pope John Paul II, Koichiro Matsuura, Jacques Chirac, Johannes Rau, Vladimir Putin, Abdulaziz Bouteflika and Hugo Chávez. In 2003 Khatami refused to meet militant Iraqi cleric Moqtada al-Sadr.

After the 2003 Bam earthquake in Iran, the Iranian government rebuffed Israel's offer of assistance. On April 8, 2005, Khatami sat near Iranian-born Israeli President Moshe Katsav during the funeral of Pope John Paul II because of alphabetical order. Later, Katsav claimed that he shook hands and spoke with Khatami. Katsav himself is in origin an Iranian Jew, and from a part of Iran close to Khatami's home; he stated that they had spoken about their home province. That would make this incident the first official political contact between Iran and Israel since diplomatic ties were severed in 1979. However, after he returned to Iran, Khatami was subject to harsh criticism from conservatives for having 'recognised' Israel by speaking to its president. Subsequently, the country's state-run media reported that Khatami strongly denied shaking hands and chatting with Katsav.

In 2003, Iran approached the United States with proposals to negotiate all outstanding issues including the nuclear issue and a two-state settlement for Israel and the Palestinians.

==== Currency crisis ====
During 1995-2005, Khatami's administration successfully reduced the rate of fall in the value of the Iranian Rial bettering even the record of Mousavi. Nevertheless, the currency continued to fall from 2,046 to 9,005 to the US dollar during his term as president.

=== Khatami and Iran's 2004 parliamentary election ===
In February 2004 Parliament elections, the Guardian Council banned thousands of candidates, including most of the reformist members of the parliament and all the candidates of the Islamic Iran Participation Front party from running. This led to a win by the conservatives of at least 70% of the seats. Approximately 60% of the eligible voting population participated in the elections.

Khatami recalled his strong opposition against holding an election his government saw as unfair and not free. He also narrated the story of his visit to the Supreme Leader, Khamenei, together with the Parliament's spokesman (considered the head of the legislature) and a list of conditions they had handed him before they could hold the elections. The list, he said, was then passed on to the Guardian Council, the legal supervisor and major obstacle to holding free and competitive elections in recent years. The members of the Guardian Council are appointed directly by the Supreme Leader and were considered to be applying his will. "But", Khatami said, "the Guardian Council kept neither the Supreme Leader's nor its own word [...] and we were faced with a situation in which we had to choose between holding the election or risking huge unrest [...] and so damaging the regime." At this point, student protesters repeatedly chanted the slogan "Jannati is the nation's enemy", referring to the chairman of the Guardian Council. Khatami replied, "If you are the representative of the nation, then we are the nation's enemy." However, after a clarification by students stating that "Jannati, not Khatami", he took advantage of the opportunity to claim a high degree of freedom in Iran.

When the Guardian Council announced the final list of candidates on 30 January, 125 Reformist members of parliament declared that they would boycott the election and resign their seats, and the Reformist interior minister declared that the election would not be held on the scheduled date, February 20. However, Khatami then announced that the election would be held on time, and he rejected the resignations of his cabinet ministers and provincial governors. These actions paved the way for the election to be held and signaled a split between the radical and moderate wings of the Reformist movement.

== Cultural and political image ==
=== Dialogue Among Civilizations ===
Following earlier works by renowned philosopher Dariush Shayegan, President Khatami introduced the theory of Dialogue Among Civilizations as a response to Samuel P. Huntington's theory of Clash of Civilizations. After introducing the concept of his theory in several international societies (most importantly the U.N.) the theory gained a lot of international support. Consequently, the United Nations proclaimed the year 2001 as the United Nations' Year of Dialogue Among Civilizations, as per Khatami's suggestion. Pleading for the moralization of politics, Khatami argued that "The political translation of dialogue among civilizations would consist in arguing that culture, morality and art must prevail on politics."

=== Khatami as a scholar ===
Khatami's main research field is political philosophy. One of Khatami's academic mentors was Javad Tabatabaei, an Iranian political philosopher. Later on Khatami became a University lecturer at Tarbiat Modarres University, where he taught political philosophy. Khatami also published a book on political philosophy in 1999. The ground he covers is the same as that covered by Javad Tabatabaei: the Platonizing adaptation of Greek political philosophy by Farabi (d. 950), its synthesis of the "eternal wisdom" of Persian statecraft by Abu'l-Hasan Amiri (d. 991) and Mushkuya Razi (d. 1030), the juristic theories of al-Mawardi and Ghazali, and Nizam al-Mulk's treatise on statecraft. He ends with a discussion of the revival of political philosophy in Safavid Isfahan in the second half of the 17th century.

Further, Khatami shares with Tabatabaei the idea of the "decline" of Muslim political thought beginning at the very outset, after Farabi.

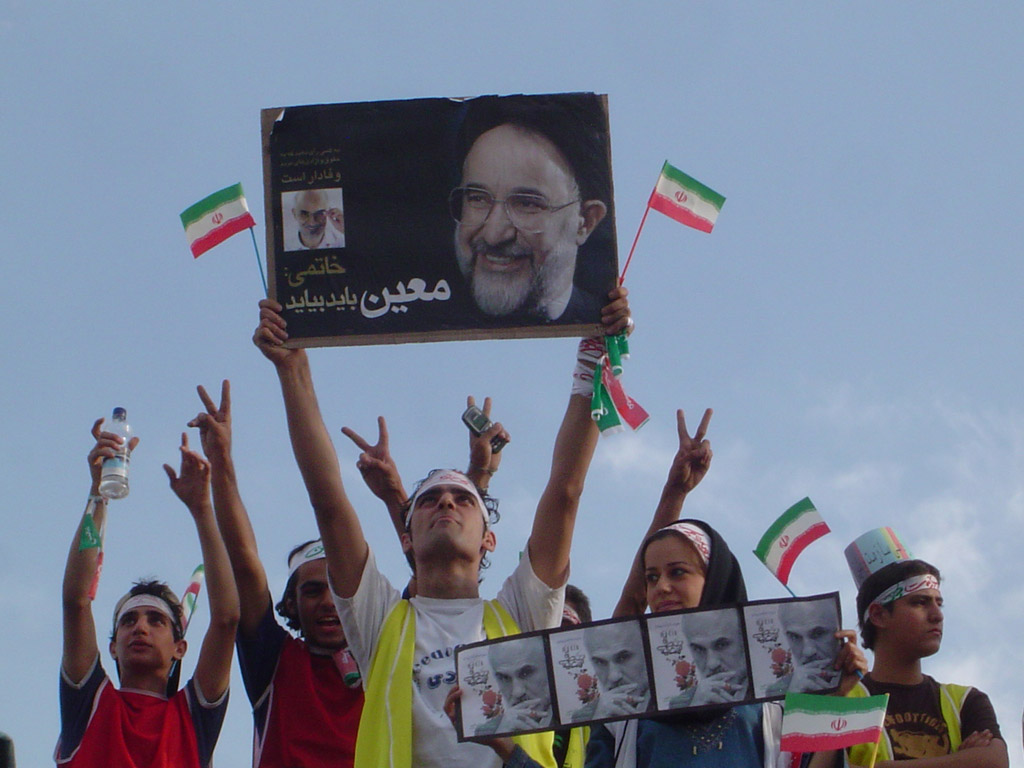
Khatami Support Moeen in 2005 presidential election

Like Tabatabaei, Khatami brings in the sharply contrasting Aristotelian view of politics to highlight the shortcomings of Muslim political thought. Khatami has also lectured on the decline in Muslim political thought in terms of the transition from political philosophy to royal policy (siyasat-i shahi) and its imputation to the prevalence of "forceful domination" (taghallub) in Islamic history.

In his "Letter for Tomorrow", he wrote:

This government is proud to announce that it heralded the era where the sanctity of power has been turned into the legitimacy of critique and criticism of that power, which is in the trust of the people who have been delegated with power to function as representatives through franchise. So such power, once considered Divine Grace, has now been reduced to an earthly power that can be criticized and evaluated by earthly beings. Instances show that although due to some traces of despotic mode of background we have not even been a fair critique of those in power, however, it is deemed upon the society, and the elite and the intellectuals in particular, not to remain indifferent at the dawn of democracy and allow freedom to be hijacked.

== Cabinet members ==
Portfolio	Minister	Took office	Left office	Party
President	Mohammad Khatami	1997	2005	ACC
First Vice President	Hassan Habibi	1997	2001	ECP
First Vice President	Mohammad Reza Aref	2001	2005	IIPF
Chief of Staff	Mohammad-Ali Abtahi	1997	2001	ACC
Chief of Staff	Ali Khatami	2001	2005	IIPF
Agriculture Minister	Issa Kalantari	1997	2000	ECP
Agriculture Minister	Mahmoud Hojjati	2000	2005	IIPF
Communications Minister	Mohammad Reza Aref	1997	2000	IIPF
Communications Minister	Nasrollah Jahangard (Acting)	2000	2000	IIPF
Communications Minister	Abdollah Mirtaheri (Acting)	2000	2000	Independent
Communications Minister	Ahmad Motamedi	2000	2005	Independent
Commerce Minister	Mohammad Shariatmadari	1997	2005	ADRV
Construction Minister	Mohammad Saeedikia	1997	2000	Independent
Cooperatives Minister	Morteza Haaji	1997	2001	IIPF
Cooperatives Minister	Ali Soufi	2001	2005	IIPF
Culture Minister	Attaollah Mohajerani	1997	2000	ECP
Culture Minister	Ahmad Masjed-Jamei	2000	2005	Independent
Defence Minister	Ali Shamkhani	1997	2005	Military
Finance Minister	Hossein Namazi	1997	2001	Independent
Finance Minister	Tahmasb Mazaheri	2001	2004	Independent
Finance Minister	Safdar Hosseini	2004	2005	IIPF
Education Minister	Hossein Mozzafar	1997	2001	IATI
Education Minister	Morteza Haaji	2001	2005	IIPF
Energy Minister	Habibolah Bitaraf	1997	2005	IIPF
Foreign Minister	Kamal Kharrazi	1997	2005	Independent
Health Minister	Mohammad Farhadi	1997	2001	AIMSI
Health Minister	Masoud Pezeshkian	2001	2005	Independent
Housing Minister	Ali Abdolalizadeh	1997	2005	ECP
Roads Minister	Mahmoud Hojatti	1997	2000	IIPF
Roads Minister	Rahman Dadman	2000	2001	IIPF
Roads Minister	Ahmad Khorram	2001	2004	IIPF
Roads Minister	Ahmad Sadegh-Bonab (Acting)	2004	2004	Independent
Roads Minister	Mohammad Rahmati	2004	2005	Independent
Mines and Metals Minister	Eshaq Jahangiri	1997	2000	ECP
Industries Minister	Gholamreza Shafeei	1997	2000	ECP
Industries and Mines Minister	Eshaq Jahangiri	2000	2005	ECP
Intelligence Minister	Ghorbanali Dorri Najafabadi	1997	1998	Independent
Intelligence Minister	Ali Younesi	1998	2005	Independent
Interior Minister	Abdollah Nouri	1997	1998	ACC
Interior Minister	Mostafa Tajzadeh (Acting)	1998	1998	IIPF
Interior Minister	Abdolvahed Mousavi Lari	1998	2005	ACC
Justice Minister	Mohammad Ismaeil Shooshtari	1997	2005	ECP
Labour Minister	Hossein Kamali	1997	2001	ILP
Labour Minister	Safdar Hosseini	2001	2004	IIPF
Labour Minister	Nasser Khaleghi	2004	2005	IIPF
Petroleum Minister	Bijan Namdar Zanganeh	1997	2005	ECP
Science Minister	Mostafa Moeen	1997	2003	IIPF
Science Minister	Jafar Towfighi	2003	2005	Independent
Welfare Minister	Mohammad Hossein Sharifzadegan	2004	2005	IIPF
Physical Education Vice President	Mostafa Hashemitaba	1997	2001	ECP
Physical Education Vice President	Mohsen Mehralizadeh	2001	2005	Independent
Atomic Energy Vice President	Gholam Reza Aghazadeh	1997	2005	ECP
Cultural Heritage Vice President	Mohammad Beheshti Shirazi	1997	2003	IIPF
Cultural Heritage Vice President	Hossein Marashi	2003	2005	ECP
Environment Vice President	Masoumeh Ebtekar	1997	2005	IIPF
Executive Vice President	Mohammad Hashemi Rafsanjani	1997	2005	ECP
Martyrs Vice President	Hossein Dehghan	2002	2005	Military
Parliamentary Vice President	Mohammad-Ali Abtahi	2001	2004	ACC
Parliamentary Vice President	Majid Ansari	2004	2005	ACC
Plan and Budget Vice President	Mohammad-Ali Najafi	1997	2000	ECP
Administrative Vice President	Mohammad Bagherian	1997	2000	Independent
Planning Vice President	Mohammad Reza Aref	2000	2001	IIPF
Planning Vice President	Mohammad Sattarifar	2001	2004	IIPF
Planning Vice President	Hamidreza Baradaran-Shoraka	2004	2005	IIPF

== See also ==
- Mohammad Khatami
- Cabinet of Iran

Presidential terms of Iran
Preceded by Presidency of Rafsanjani	Presidency of Khatami; 1997–2005	Succeeded by Presidency of Ahmadinejad
