= Presidency of Akbar Hashemi Rafsanjani =

Iranian presidential administration from 1989 to 1997

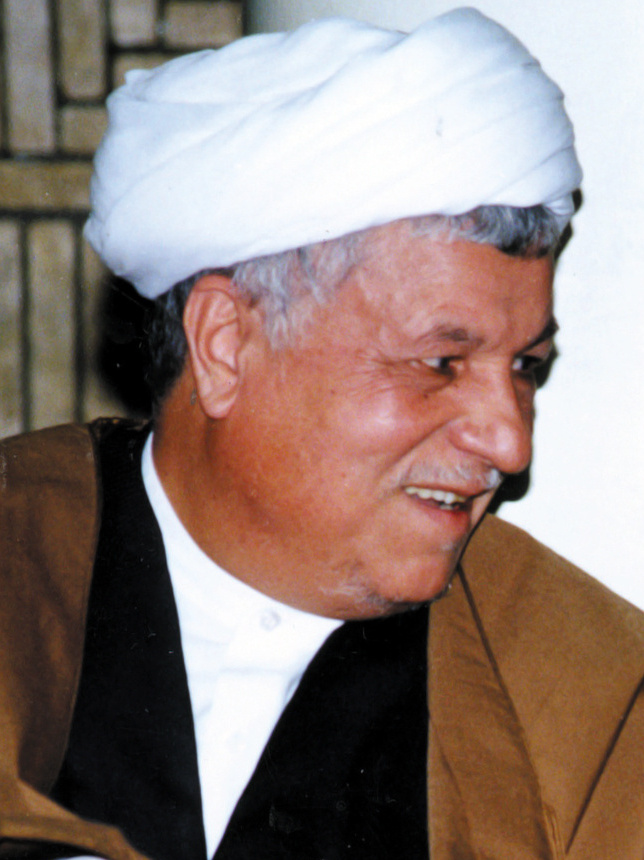
- Presidency of Akbar Hashemi Rafsanjani; 16 August 1989 – 3 August 1997
- Vice President: Hassan Habibi
- Cabinet: First cabinet, Second cabinet
- Party: Combatant Clergy; Executives of Construction Party (from 1996)
- Election: 1989; 1993
- Seat: Pasteur St. Building
- Seal of the president

Akbar Hashemi Rafsanjani's tenure as the 5th president of Iran began with his Inauguration on 16 August 1989, 10 days after His predecessor officially became the Supreme Leader until he left office on 3 August 1997.

== Rafsanjani's Presidency ==
Rafsanjani adopted an "economy-first" policy, supporting a policy of privatization as opposed to leftist economic tendencies in the Islamic Republic. Another source describes his administration as "economically liberal, politically authoritarian, and philosophically traditional" which put him in confrontation with the more radical deputies who in the majority in the Majles of Iran.

=== Domestic policy ===
Rafsanjani advocated a free-market economy. With the state's coffers full, Rafsanjani pursued an economic liberalisation policy. Rafsanjani's support for a deal with the United States over Iran's nuclear programme and his free-market economic policies contrasted with Mahmoud Ahmadinejad and his allies, who advocated maintaining a hard line against Western intervention in the Middle East while pursuing a policy of economic redistribution to Iran's poor. By espousing World Bank-inspired structural adjustment policies, Rafsanjani desired a modern industrial-based economy integrated into the global economy.

Rafsanjani urged universities to cooperate with industries. Turning to the quick pace of developments in today's world, he said that with "the world constantly changing, we should adjust ourselves to the conditions of our lifetime and make decisions according to present circumstances". Among the projects he initiated is the Islamic Azad University.

During his presidency, a period in which Rafsanjani is described by western media sources as having been the most powerful figure in Iran, the judicial system of Iran executed political dissidents, drug offenders, communists, Kurds, Bahá'ís, and clerics.

=== Foreign policy ===
Following years of deterioration in foreign relations under Khomeini during the Iran-Iraq war, Rafsanjani sought to rebuild ties among Arab states, as well as with countries in Central Asia, including Azerbaijan, Turkmenistan and Kazakhstan. However, relations with European countries and the United States remained poor, even though Rafsanjani has a track record of handling difficult situations and defusing crises.

He condemned both the United States and Iraq during the Persian Gulf War in 1991. After the war he strove to renew close ties with the West, although he refused to lift Ruhollah Khomeini's fatwa against the British author Salman Rushdie.

Rafsanjani has said that Iran is ready to assist Iraq, "expecting nothing in return". On the other hand, he has said that "peace and stability" is a function of the "evacuation of the occupiers."

Iran gave humanitarian help to the victims of the conflict. Iran sent truck loads of food and medicine to Iraq and thousands of Kuwaiti refugees were given shelters in Iran.

Rafsanjani voiced support to Prince Abdullah's peace initiative and to "everything the Palestinians agree to". He was also clear that Iran's international interests must take precedence over those of Iranian allies in Syria and Lebanon.

Rafsanjani is a supporter of Iran's nuclear program. In 2007, Rafsanjani reiterated that the use of weapons of mass destruction was not part of the Islamic Republic culture. Rafsanjani said: "You [US and allies] are saying that you cannot trust Iran would not use its nuclear achievements in the military industries, but we are ready to give you full assurances in this respect."

==== Currency crisis ====
From 1990 to 1995, Rafsanjani's administration faced the brunt of the second-generation US economic sanctions. He failed to stop the Iranian rial from plunging 80% in value from 415 to 2,046 to the US dollar, triggering the rise of the modern underground and barter economic networks.

== Members of the cabinet ==
Portfolio	Minister	Took office	Left office	Party
Presidential Administration
President	Akbar Hashemi Rafsanjani	16 August 1989	3 August 1997	Combatant Clergy Association (ECP)
First Vice President	Hassan Habibi	21 August 1989	3 August 1997	ECP
Chief of Staff	Mohammad Mir-Mohammadi	August 1989	16 February 1994	Nonpartisan
Chief of Staff	Hossein Marashi	1994	1996	ECP
Chief of Staff	Mohsen Hashemi Rafsanjani	29 May 1996	August 1997	ECP
Ministers
Agriculture Minister	Issa Kalantari	29 August 1989	20 August 1997	ECP
Communications Minister	Mohammad Gharazi	29 August 1989	20 August 1997	ECP
Commerce Minister	Yahya Ale Eshaq	29 August 1989	16 August 1993	ICP
Commerce Minister	Abdolhossein Vahaji	16 August 1993	20 August 1997	Nonpartisan
Construction Minister	Gholamreza Forouzesh	29 August 1989	20 August 1997	ECP
Cooperatives Minister	Gholamreza Shafeei	29 August 1989	20 August 1997	ECP
Culture Minister	Mohammad Khatami	29 August 1989	24 May 1992	ACC
Culture Minister	Ali Larijani	16 July 1992	15 February 1994	ICP
Culture Minister	Mostafa Mirsalim	22 February 1994	20 August 1997	ICP
Defence Minister	Akbar Torkan	29 August 1989	16 August 1993	ECP
Defence Minister	Mohammad Forouzandeh	16 August 1993	20 August 1997	Military
Finance Minister	Mohsen Nourbakhsh	29 August 1989	16 August 1993	ECP
Finance Minister	Abdolhossein Vahaji (head of ministry)	17 August 1993	6 October 1993	Nonpartisan
Finance Minister	Morteza Mohammadkhan	6 October 1993	20 August 1997	ECP
Education Minister	Mohammad-Ali Najafi	29 August 1989	20 August 1997	ECP
Energy Minister	Bijan Namdar Zanganeh	29 August 1989	20 August 1997	ECP
Foreign Minister	Ali Akbar Velayati	29 August 1989	20 August 1997	ICP
Health Minister	Iradj Fazel	29 August 1989	13 January 1991	Nonpartisan
Health Minister	Reza Malekzadeh	13 January 1991	16 August 1993	ECP
Health Minister	Alireza Marandi	16 August 1993	20 August 1997	ICP
Housing Minister	Serajeddin Kazerouni	29 August 1989	16 August 1993	Nonpartisan
Housing Minister	Abbas Ahmad Akhoundi	16 August 1993	20 August 1997	Nonpartisan
Roads Minister	Mohammad Saeedikia	29 August 1989	16 August 1993	Nonpartisan
Roads Minister	Akbar Torkan	16 August 1993	20 August 1997	ECP
Mines and Metals Minister	Hossein Mahlouji	29 August 1989	20 August 1997	ECP
Light Industries Minister	Mohammadreza Nematzadeh	29 August 1989	20 August 1997	ECP
Heavy Industries Minister	Mohammad Hadi Nejad Hosseinian	29 August 1989	20 August 1997	ECP
Intelligence Minister	Ali Fallahian	29 August 1989	20 August 1997	CCA
Interior Minister	Abdollah Nouri	29 August 1989	16 August 1993	ACC
Interior Minister	Ali Mohammad Besharati	16 August 1993	20 August 1997	Nonpartisan
Justice Minister	Mohammad Ismaeil Shooshtari	29 August 1989	20 August 1997	ECP
Labour Minister	Hossein Kamali	29 August 1989	20 August 1997	WH
Petroleum Minister	Gholamreza Aghazadeh	20 August 1989	20 August 1997	ECP
Higher Education Minister	Mostafa Moeen	29 August 1989	16 August 1993	AIMSI
Higher Education Minister	Mohammad-Reza Hashemi	16 August 1993	20 August 1997	Nonpartisan
Other cabinet-level officials
Physical Education Vice President	Hassan Ghafourifard	September 1989	16 February 1994	ICP
Physical Education Vice President	Mostafa Hashemitaba	16 February 1994	23 August 1997	ECP
Atomic Energy Vice President	Reza Amrollahi	16 August 1989	3 September 1997	ECP
Environment Vice President	Hadi Manafi	16 August 1989	23 August 1997	Nonpartisan
Executive Vice President	Hamid Mirzadeh	1989	1994	Nonpartisan
Executive Vice President	Mohammad Hashemi Rafsanjani	1994	1997	ECP
Legal and Parliamentary Vice President	Ataollah Mohajerani	21 August 1989	23 August 1997	ECP
Plan and Budget Vice President	Masoud Roghani	1989	1994	Nonpartisan
Plan and Budget Vice President	Hamid Mirzadeh	1994	1997	Nonpartisan
Administrative Vice President	Mansour Razavi	16 August 1989	16 February 1994	ECP
Administrative Vice President	Mohammad Mir-Mohammadi	16 February 1994	23 August 1997	Nonpartisan
Economic Vice President	Mohsen Nourbakhsh	August 1993	14 September 1994	ECP

== See also ==
- Cabinet of Iran

Presidential terms of Iran
Preceded by Presidency of Khamenei	Presidency of Rafsanjani; 1989–1997	Succeeded by Presidency of Khatami
