= Second premiership of Mir-Hossein Mousavi =

In August 1981, President Mohammad-Ali Rajai and Prime Minister Mohammad-Javad Bahonar were assassinated in an explosion. Ali Khamenei was then elected as the third president of Iran in the October 1981 Iranian presidential election. He put forward Ali Akbar Velayati as his prime minister, but the Iranian parliament did not give him the vote of confidence, and he was defeated with a vote of 80 to 74. Subsequently, Ali Khamenei, though he had strong disagreements with Mousavi, as a compromise with the left-leaning parliament, agreed to offer him, Mousavi, for the post of premier. On 28 October, the parliament approved Mousavi with a vote of 115 to 39. Mousavi became the 79th Prime Minister of Iran on 31 October 1981, and remained the prime minister of Iran until 3 August 1989, for eight years.

The conflicts between Mousavi, who belonged to the left wing of the Islamic Republic, with Ali Khamenei (the current leader of Iran), who belonged to the right wing of the Islamic Republic, continued during their eight years of shared governance. However, an escalation in conflicts between the two led to Mousavi's resignation shortly after the end of the Iran–Iraq War in 1988. As the prime minister, Mousavi had the full backing of Ruhollah Khomeini, the supreme leader, and he refused to accept his resignation. Mousavi is remembered as leading a government that did not tolerate dissent.

Mousavi's premiership coincided with the Iran–Iraq War. He guided the country through its war with Iraq, and earned popular acclaim for his stewardship of the national economy. He pioneered a bond-based economy, which many believe was responsible for a fair distribution of goods among the people throughout the Iran–Iraq War.

Many analysts praise his handling of Iran's economy, his civil and economic leadership during the Iran–Iraq War, and his efforts to end Iran's international isolation. Others remember him as being "unpredictable" and less able to navigate Iran's labyrinthine political system than were his rivals. In 1986, Mousavi played a great role in the Iran–Contra affair and secret negotiations and dealing with USA on helping them free the American hostages in Lebanon, in return for sale of the American weapons and spare-parts that Iran's army badly needed for Iran–Iraq War.

Shortly after the end of Iran–Iraq War on 20 August 1988, Ruhollah Khomeini died, and Ali Khamenei was elected as the new Supreme Leader by the Assembly of Experts. Following his death, Mousavi and his fellow left-wingers lost their main source of support within the establishment.

During the parliament hearing on post-war reconstruction plans, Mousavi had heated arguments with Ali Akbar Hashemi Rafsanjani, the speaker of Iran's parliament at the time, over Rafsanjani's suggestion that Iran accept the offer of western countries to help with post-war reconstruction.

On 28 July 1989, the constitution was amended and approved by Iranian voters in a national referendum with a 97% yes vote. At this time, Mehdi Karroubi had been elected as the new speaker of the parliament, to whom the amended constitution was declared. According to one of the amendments, the prime minister's position was abolished.

Hashemi Rafsanjani was also elected as the fourth president of Iran on 28 July 1989 and became the president on 3 August 1989. Mousavi's premiership, ended on the same date. He was the 79th and the last Prime Minister of Iran, since the constitutional revolution in 1906.

Mousavi was not invited to be a participant in the new government headed by Rafsanjani, and disappeared from the public sphere.

This is a list of ministers of Second Cabinet of Mousavi (1985–89):

Office	Minister
Agriculture	Abass-Ali Zali
Commerce	Hossein Abedi Jafari
Post	Mohammad Gharazi
Culture and Islamic Guidance	Mohammad Khatami
Defense and Armed Forces Logistics	Mohammad Hossein Jalali
Economy and Financial Affairs	Hossein Namazi
Education	Kazem Akrami
Energy	Mohammad-Taqi Banki
Foreign Affairs	Ali Akbar Velayati
Health and Medical Education	Alireza Marandi
Housing and Urban Development	Serajoldin Kazeroni
Industries and Mines	Behzad Nabavi
Intelligence	Mohammad Reyshahri
Interior	Abdollah Nouri
Justice	Hassan Habibi
Labour and Social Affairs	Abolghasem Sarhadizadeh
Petroleum	Gholam Reza Aghazadeh
Roads and Transportation	Mohammad Saeedikia
Science, Research, and Technology	Mohammad Farhadi

== See also ==
- Confirmations of Mir-Hossein Mousavi's Cabinet

Cabinet of Iran
Preceded by First Government of Mousavi	Second Cabinet of Mousavi; 1985–1989	Succeeded by First Government of Rafsanjani
