= Confirmations of Mir-Hossein Mousavi's Cabinet =

This article mentions the introduction and confirmation process for any successful or unsuccessful cabinet nominees of Mir-Hossein Mousavi during his administration.

== First cabinet ==
| Date | Portfolio | Designated officeholder | Vote of confidence | R |
|---|---|---|---|---|
Prime Minister gets vote of confidence on 29 October 1981
| 1981–11–02 | Ministry of Agriculture | Mohammad Salamati | 120 16 25 | |
| 1981–11–02 | Ministry of Commerce | Habibollah Asgaroladi | 131 11 12 | |
| 1981–11–02 | Ministry of Higher Education | Mohammad-Ali Najafi | 135 9 15 | |
| 1981–11–02 | Ministry of National Defence | Mohammad Salimi | 102 27 27 | |
| 1981–11–02 | Ministry of Economy and Finance | Hossein Namazi | 148 1 11 | |
| 1981–11–02 | Ministry of Education | Ali-Akbar Parvaresh | 146 12 2 | |
| 1981–11–02 | Ministry of Energy | Hassan Ghafourifard | 108 24 23 | |
| 1981–11–02 | Ministry of Health | Hadi Manafi | 124 18 17 | |
| 1981–11–02 | Ministry of Housing | Mohammad-Shahab Gonabadi | 132 15 12 | |
| 1981–11–02 | Ministry of Industries | Mostafa Hashemitaba | 115 20 22 | |
| 1981–11–02 | Ministry of Interior | Kamaleddin Nikravesh | 102 30 29 | |
| 1981–11–02 | Ministry of Islamic Guidance | Abdolmajid Moadikhah | 137 9 4 | |
| 1981–11–02 | Ministry of Justice | Mohammad Asghari | 145 7 7 | |
| 1981–11–02 | Ministry of Labour | Ahmad Tavakkoli | 105 28 23 | |
| 1981–11–02 | Ministry of Mining and Metals | Hossein Mousaviani | 113 15 22 | |
| 1981–11–02 | Ministry of Petroleum | Mohammad Gharazi | 141 10 9 | |
| 1981–11–02 | Ministry of Post, Telegraph & Telephone | Morteza Nabavi | 153 2 3 | |
| 1981–11–02 | Ministry of Roads and Transportation | Hadi Nejad-Hosseinian | 146 1 12 | |
| 1981–11–02 | Minister without portfolio for Executive Affairs | Behzad Nabavi | 134 12 11 | |
| 1981–11–02 | Minister without portfolio for Plan and Budget | Mohammad-Taghi Banki | 158 6 | |
| 1981–11–02 | Minister without portfolio for State Welfare | Mahmoud Rouhani | 154 3 | |
| 1981–12–15 | Ministry of Foreign Affairs | Ali-Akbar Velayati | 155 19 12 | |
| 1981–12–15 | Ministry of Interior | Ali Akbar Nategh-Nouri | 176 6 6 | |
| 1981–05–31 | Ministry of Heavy Industries | Behzad Nabavi | 125 27 15 | |
| 1981–05–31 | Minister without portfolio for Executive Affairs | Gholam-Reza Aghazadeh | 117 7 37 | |
| 1982–11–9 | Ministry of Islamic Guidance | Mohammad Khatami | 121 27 22 | |
| 1982–11–9 | Ministry of Revolutionary Guards | Mohsen Rafighdoust | 139 11 23 | |
| 1982–11–9 | Minister without portfolio for State Welfare | Mohammad-Javad Ejei | 126 7 38 | |
| 1983–08–28 | Ministry of Agriculture | Issa Kalantari (rejected) | 74 57 58 | |
| 1983–08–28 | Ministry of Commerce | Hassan Abedi-Jafari | 134 23 32 | |
| 1983–08–28 | Ministry of Housing | Serajeddin Kazerouni (rejected) | 66 68 48 | |
| 1983–08–28 | Ministry of Labour | Abolghasem Sarhadizadeh | 121 17 47 | |
| 1983–08–28 | Ministry of Mining and Metals | Hossein Naji (rejected) | 51 40 88 | |
| 1983–12–07 | Ministry of Housing | Mohammad Morovvat (rejected) | 66 62 32 | |
| 1983–12–07 | Ministry of Agriculture | Abbas-Ali Zali | 102 41 21 | |
| 1983–12–07 | Ministry of Mining and Metals | Hossein Nili-Ahmadabadi | 102 35 23 | |
| 1984–02–21 | Ministry of Construction | Bijan Namdar Zanganeh | 110 | |
| 1984–02–21 | Ministry of Intelligence | Esmaeil Ferdosipour (rejected) | 74 | |
| 1984–02–21 | Ministry of Housing | Mohammad-Hassan Tehraninejad (rejected) | 78 | |
Prime Minister gets vote of confidence on 5 August 1984
| 1984–08–14 | Ministry of Agriculture | Abbas-Ali Zali | 141 26 35 | |
| 1984–08–14 | Ministry of Commerce | Hassan Abedi-Jafari | 156 29 23 | |
| 1984–08–14 | Ministry of Construction | Bijan Namdar Zanganeh | 161 19 27 | |
| 1984–08–14 | Ministry of Higher Education | Mohammad-Ali Najafi (rejected) | 51 89 64 | |
| 1984–08–14 | Ministry of National Defence | Mohammad Salimi (rejected) | 97 57 51 | |
| 1984–08–14 | Ministry of Economy and Finance | Hossein Namazi | 106 38 56 | |
| 1984–08–14 | Ministry of Education | Ali-Akbar Parvaresh (rejected) | 99 81 25 | |
| 1984–08–14 | Ministry of Energy | Hassan Ghafourifard | 179 11 18 | |
| 1984–08–14 | Ministry of Health | Hadi Manafi (rejected) | 102 53 46 | |
| 1984–08–14 | Ministry of Heavy Industries | Behzad Nabavi | 106 65 32 | |
| 1984–08–14 | Ministry of Industries | Mostafa Hashemitaba (rejected) | 622 90 53 | |
| 1984–08–14 | Ministry of Interior | Ali Akbar Nategh-Nouri | 107 69 29 | |
| 1984–08–14 | Ministry of Islamic Guidance | Mohammad Khatami | 158 28 19 | |
| 1984–08–14 | Ministry of Labour | Abolghasem Sarhadizadeh | 162 18 23 | |
| 1984–08–14 | Ministry of Mining and Metals | Hossein Nili-Ahmadabadi | 106 38 60 | |
| 1984–08–14 | Ministry of Petroleum | Mohammad Gharazi | 154 29 23 | |
| 1984–08–14 | Ministry of Post, Telegraph & Telephone | Morteza Nabavi | 140 43 24 | |
| 1984–08–14 | Ministry of Revolutionary Guards | Mohsen Rafighdoust | 154 28 23 | |
| 1984–08–14 | Ministry of Roads and Transportation | Hadi Nejad-Hosseinian | 190 6 12 | |
| 1984–08–15 | Ministry of Housing | Serajeddin Kazerouni | 174 12 14 | |
| 1984–08–15 | Ministry of Intelligence | Mohammad Reyshahri | 176 11 13 | |
| 1984–08–15 | Ministry of Justice | Hassan Habibi | 176 14 10 | |
| 1984–08–20 | Ministry of Health | Alireza Marandi | 174 16 19 | |
| 1984–08–20 | Ministry of Higher Education | Iradj Fazel | 178 17 14 | |
| 1984–08–20 | Ministry of Industries | Gholamreza Shafeei | 187 15 7 | |
| 1984–10–18 | Ministry of Education | Reza Akrami | 122 39 26 | |
| 1984–10–18 | Ministry of Defence | Farrokh Azimi-Etemadi (rejected) | 76 66 40 | |
