= Hassan Rouhani 2013 presidential campaign =

Rouhani 2013
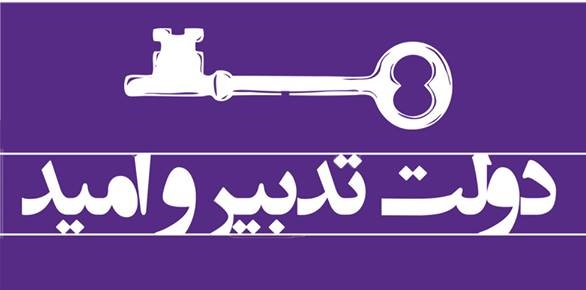
- Campaign: 2013 Iranian presidential election
- Candidate: Hassan Rouhani; Former Secretary of Supreme National Security Council; Former Member of the Parliament
- Affiliation: Moderation and Development Party
- Status: Announced: 22 November 2012; Nominated: 7 May 2013; Registered: 21 May 2013; Won election: 14 June 2013
- Headquarters: 7th Tir street, Tehran, Iran
- Key people: Mohammadreza Nematzadeh (Chairman); Akbar Torkan (Deputy Chairman); Yasser Hashemi Rafsanjani (Adviser); Ali Younesi (Religious and Minorities); Mohammad Bagher Nobakht (Spokesperson); Masoud Soltanifar (Communications)
- Slogan
- Chant: Government of Prudence and Hope

Website
- Rouhani.ir; Drrohani.com (Supporters)

Hassan Rouhani, a moderate Iranian politician and former Secretary of the Supreme National Security Council, also known as the Diplomat Sheikh, launched his presidential campaign in March 2013. He was earlier expected to withdraw and endorse Ali Akbar Hashemi Rafsanjani after he registered, but he returned to the race after Hashemi's disqualification. The symbol of Rouhani's campaign was a key and his slogan was "Government of Prudence and Hope." On 15 June, he was elected as the president with 18,613,329 votes.

== Campaign staff and policy team ==
- Mohammadreza Nematzadeh, Campaign chair. Minister of Industries (1989–1997)
- Akbar Torkan, Campaign vice chair. Minister of Defense (1989–1993) and Minister of Transportation (1993–1997)
- Mahmoud Vaezi, Foreign affairs committee chair, Deputy Minister of Foreign Affairs (1990–1997)
- Ali Younesi, Religions committee chair. Minister of Intelligence (2000–2005)
- Mohammad Bagher Nobakht, Campaign spokesman. Member of the Parliament (1988–2004)
- Yasser Hashemi Rafsanjani, Advisor.

== Policies ==
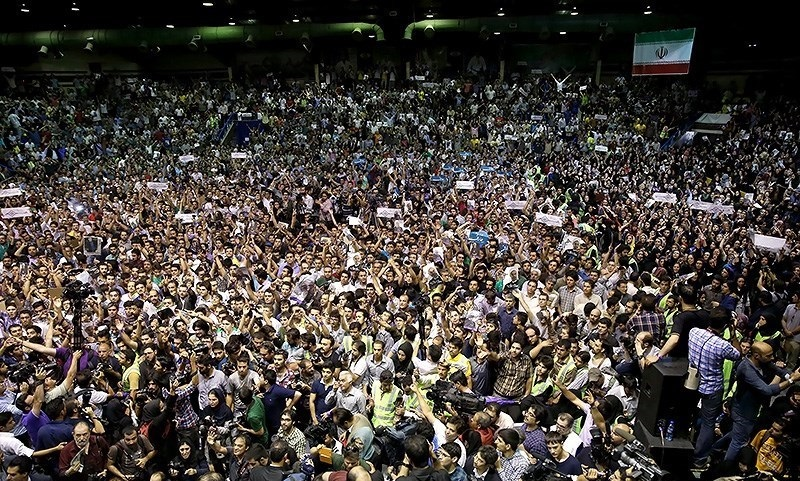
Rouhani's supporters during an election convention in Shahid Shiroudi Hall, 8 June 2013

Rouhani questioned the formal policy of the government about different issues.

=== Economy ===
Rouhani considers the existing problems in the field of economy and other sectors due to incorrect management by the incumbent administration. He admitted with proper planning, production units can be activated and jobs can be created, but this needs stability because sometimes economic regulations of the country have changed 50 times in a single month.

=== Nuclear program ===
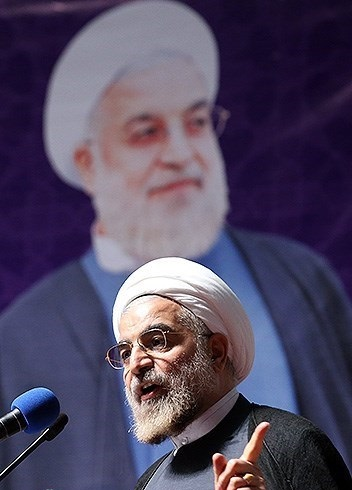
Rouhani speaking between his supporters in women convention

Rohani defended his track record as Iran's chief nuclear negotiator from October 2003 to August 2005. He said he moved war, sanctions, and the UN Security Council (resolutions) away from Iran. About his view on nuclear program and its relationship with economical problems due to sanctions he said:

"when a centrifuge is supposed to keep spinning while the entire country remains stagnant, meaning that we launch the single Natanz nuclear facility, but hundreds of our factories face problems, stop operating or work at a 20-percent capacity due to a lack of parts, raw materials and sanctions… that we do not approve of."

— Hassan Rouhani

Rouhani has pledged more transparency about what he says is Iran's peaceful nuclear enrichment program, aimed at producing fuel for nuclear reactors to generate electricity. He told Alsharq Alawsat:

”Iran has an exclusively peaceful nuclear program, which under international law is lawful and indisputable. A politically motivated campaign of misinformation has persistently attempted to cast doubts on the exclusively peaceful nature of this program. This campaign is being fueled and directed first and foremost by Israel, in order to divert international attention not only from its own clandestine and dangerous nuclear weapons program, but also from its destabilizing and inhuman policies and practices in Palestine and the Middle East. Regrettably, the Security Council has discredited itself by allowing the United States to impose this counter-productive Israeli agenda. If elected, I will reverse this trend by restoring international confidence . . . Nuclear weapons have no role in Iran’s national security doctrine, and therefore Iran has nothing to conceal. But in order to move towards the resolution of Iran’s nuclear dossier, we need to build both domestic consensus and global convergence and understanding through dialogue.""

— Hassan Rouhani

"No one lost in this election."

— Hassan Rouhani.

=== Diplomacy with the United States ===
Hassan Rouhani promised more effective diplomacy with the West. Rouhani said, in Asharq Al-Awsat:

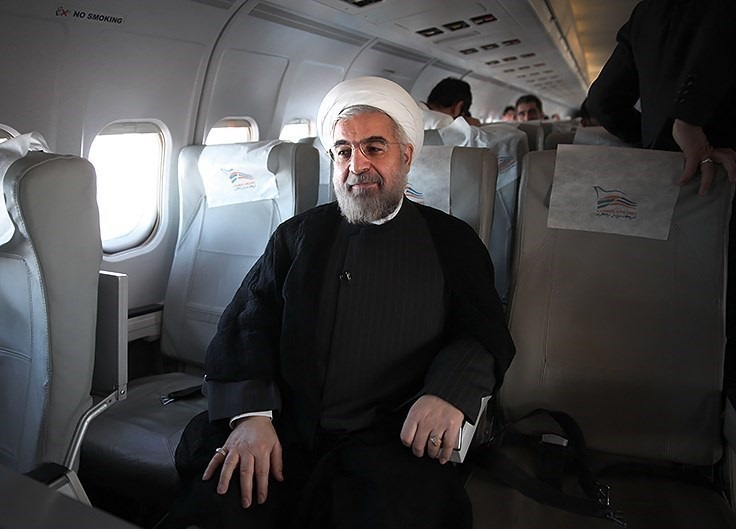
Rouhani on an airplane

"The Iran–US relationship is a complex and difficult issue. A bitter history, filled with mistrust and animosity, marks this relationship. It has become a chronic wound whose healing is difficult but possible, provided that good faith and mutual respect prevail. [...] As a moderate, I have a phased plan to deescalate hostility to a manageable state of tension and then engage in promotion of interactions and dialogue between the two peoples to achieve détente, and finally reach to the point of mutual respect that both peoples deserve."

— Hassan Rouhani

=== Treatment of Political Prisoners ===
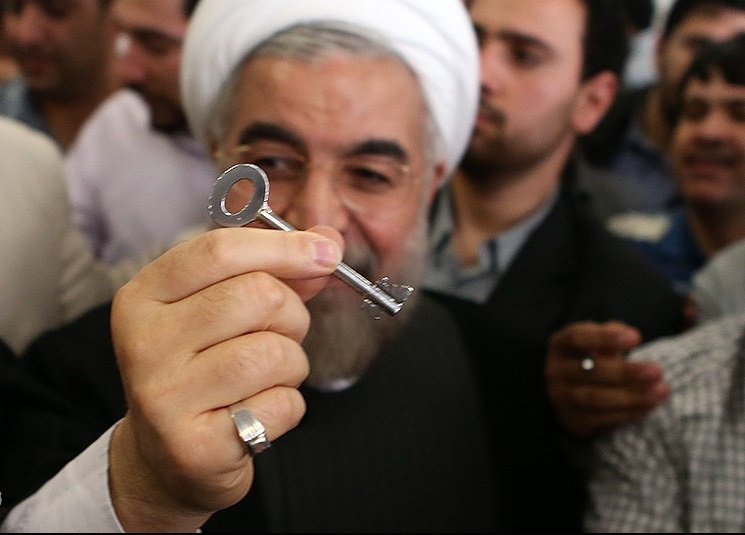
Rouhani showing a key, his election campaign symbol

Rouhani has promised to attempt to heal the severe rift between Green Movement liberals and Khomeinist hard liners by getting Mir-Hossein Mousavi and Mehdi Karroubi, leaders of the 2009 protest movement, released from house arrest. He said "I was Iran’s national Security Advisor for sixteen years during the administrations of Rafsanjani and Khatami. Therefore, I know how to deal with sensitive issues. If elected, I will do my best to secure the release of those who have been incarcerated following the regrettable events of 2009. I know that the constitutional powers of the president in Iran do not extend to the areas outside the realm of the executive branch of the system. However, I am quite optimistic that I can muster the necessary domestic consensus to improve the present situation of Mr. Mousavi and Mr. Karrubi."

== Disqualification rumors ==
As Mehr news agency reported Rouhani might get disqualified prior to the upcoming presidential elections. The news agency announced that an anonymous source had told it that the reasoning of a possible disqualification was the disclosure of confidential information related to Iran's nuclear program during the televised debates. Another reason for a possible disqualification of Rouhani was the slogans that his supporters chanted, according to the source. The disqualification was thereafter denied by the Guardian Council.

== Consensus of Reformists for Rouhani ==
"It was never about me or Dr. Aref, It has always been about our shared goals."

— Rouhani said.

Three days before the presidential election, Iranian moderates and reformists coalesced behind Hassan Rouhani; Including Akbar Hashemi Rafsanjani, Mohammad Khatami and Molavi Abdul Hamid. This Consensus happened after the withdrawal of the only reformist candidate Mohammad Reza Aref. Aref withdrew on the advice of Mohammad Khatami so the electorate would all stand behind Rouhani, so there wouldn't be a split in the vote between the two and to greatly limit the chance of a conservative victory. This showed that the moderates and reformists had united together and had thrown all their support behind Rouhani, which the conservatives failed to do with a single conservative candidate.

== Observers views on candidacy ==
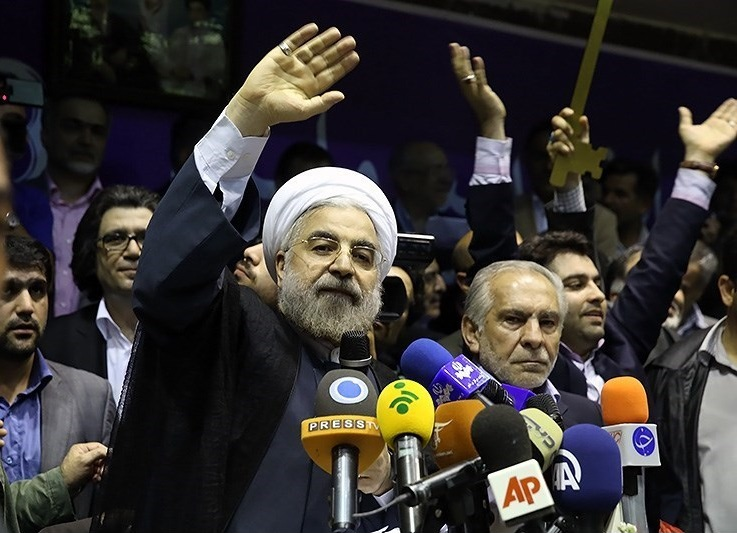
Rouhani speaking in Tehran

- Nader Hashemi, director of the Center for Middle East Studies at the University of Denver:

"The more I hear about Rouhani, the more I'm encouraged that he might be able to be a spoiler in this election."

— Nader Hashemi

- Farideh Farhi, Iran expert at the University of Hawaii:

"He doesn't yet know how the other side will respond, mainly the United States and whether the United States will also show flexibility. Rouhani would want that kind of flexibility in order to be able to strike a deal."

— Farideh Farhi

== Endorsements ==
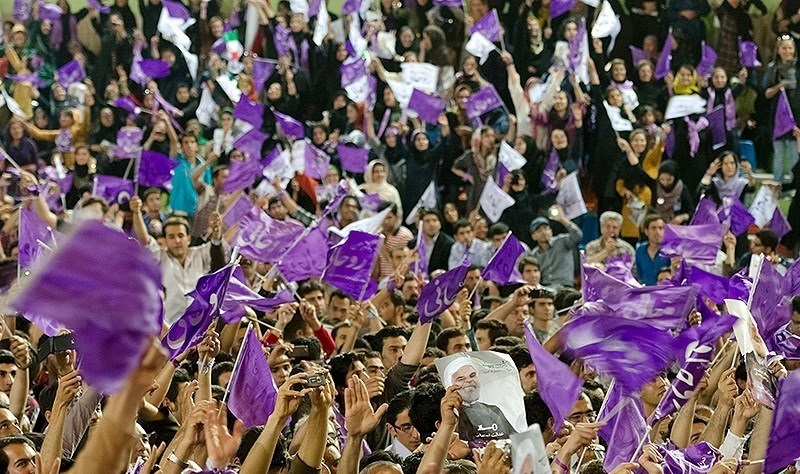
Presidential supporters candidate Rouhani

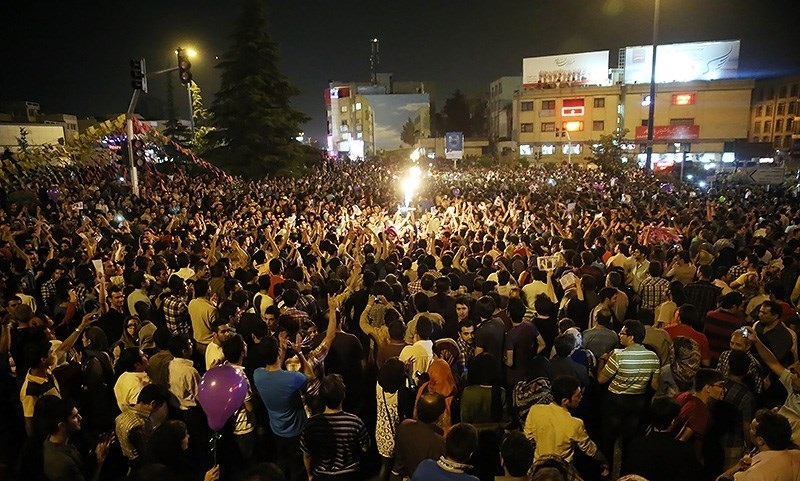
Rouhani's supporters celebrating after his election victory

- Moderation and Development Party
- Association of Combatant Clerics
- Islamic Iran Participation Front
- Coordination Council for the Reformist Front
- Assembly of Qom Seminary Scholars and Researchers
- Executives of Construction Party
- Freedom Movement
- Labour Coalition
- Democracy Party
- Nationalist-Religious movement
- Iranian Call and Reform Organization
List of famous individuals endorsing Hassan Rouhani
- Mohammad Khatami
- Akbar Hashemi Rafsanjani
- Ali Motahari
- Ahmad Montazeri
- Mohsen Hashemi Rafsanjani
- Yousef Saanei
- Mohammad-Reza Aref
- Hassan Khomeini
- Hadi Khamenei
- Gholamhossein Karbaschi
- Mostafa Malekian
- Mostafa Tajzadeh
- Mostafa Moin
- Ali Akbar Nategh Nouri
- Asadollah Bayat-Zanjani
- Mohammad-Reza Khatami
- Ali Mohammad Dastgheib Shirazi
- Mohammad Shariatmadari
- Pegah Ahangarani
- Abdolhossein Mokhtabad
- Bahareh Rahnama
- Jafar Towfighi
- Peyman Ghasem Khani
- Shahram Nazeri
- Elaheh Koulaei
- Masoumeh Ebtekar
- Ghodratollah Alikhani
- Hassan Ghafourifard
- Eshaq Jahangiri
- Mostafa Moeen
- Ahmad Khorram
- Behdad Salimi
- Sahar Dolatshahi
- Amir Jafari
- Reza Kianian
- Mostafa Tajzadeh
- Tannaz Tabatabaei
- Masoud Jafari Jozani
- Leyli Rashidi
- Arya Aramnejad
- Arash Sadeghi
- Mohsen Mirdamadi
- Majid Barzegar
- Saeed Laylaz
- Hesameddin Seraj
- Mohammad Sattarifar
- Abbas Abdi
- Habibollah Peyman
- Mohsen Safaei Farahani
- Abdollah Ramezanzadeh

== See also ==
- Hassan Rouhani 2017 presidential campaign
- Akbar Hashemi Rafsanjani 2013 presidential campaign
