= Mohammad-Javad Azari Jahromi =

Iranian politician and former intelligence officer

- محمدجواد آذری جهرمی
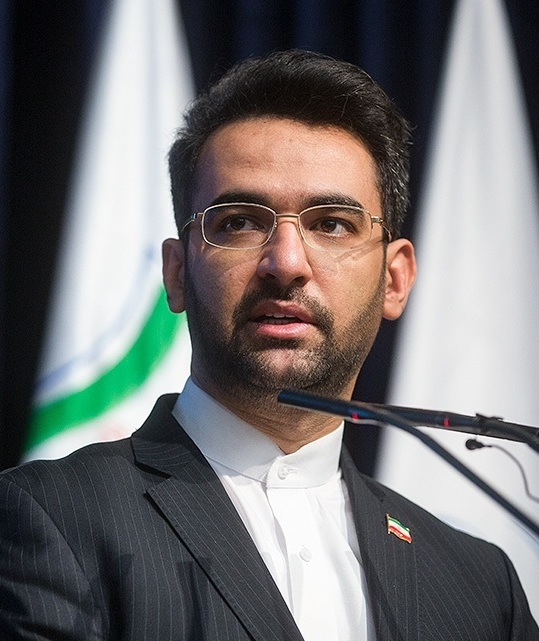

Minister of Information and Communications Technology
- In office 20 August 2017 – 25 August 2021
- President: Hassan Rouhani
- Preceded by: Mahmoud Vaezi
- Succeeded by: Issa Zarepour

Personal details
- Born: 16 September 1981 (age 45) Jahrom, Fars province, Iran
- Children: 4
- Education: Power and Water University of Technology

Mohammad-Javad Azari Jahromi (Persian: محمدجواد آذری جهرمی; born 16 September 1982) is an Iranian politician and former intelligence officer who served as the Minister of Information and Communications Technology in the administration of President Hassan Rouhani from 2017 to 2021.

He gained vote of confidence from the parliament on 20 August 2017, with 152 yeas, 120 nays, 7 abstentions and 9 invalid votes.

He was the youngest member of the cabinet of Iran, as well as the first Iranian minister born after the Iranian revolution.

== Early life and education ==
Azari Jahromi was born in Jahrom, Fars province and was raised in a poor family. During the Iran-Iraq War, his 16-year-old brother was killed. He studied electrical engineering at the Power and Water University of Technology, where he met his future wife.

== Career ==
Azari Jahromi worked at the Ministry of Intelligence from 2002 to 2009, where he for some time held managerial positions and was involved in crackdown of 2009 election protests. From 2009 to 2014, he served as general manager of the communications systems security department at the Communication Regulatory Authority. He then became ex-officio vice minister of information and communications technology, in his capacity as the chairman of Telecommunications Infrastructure Company. Jahrami was also a non-executive member of the board of directors at RighTel between 2014 and 2016.

In November 2019, the U.S. Treasury Department sanctioned Azari "for his role in the Iranian regime’s widescale internet censorship," freezing any of his U.S. assets and banning U.S. persons from doing business with him.

== Meeting with an Iranian hacker ==
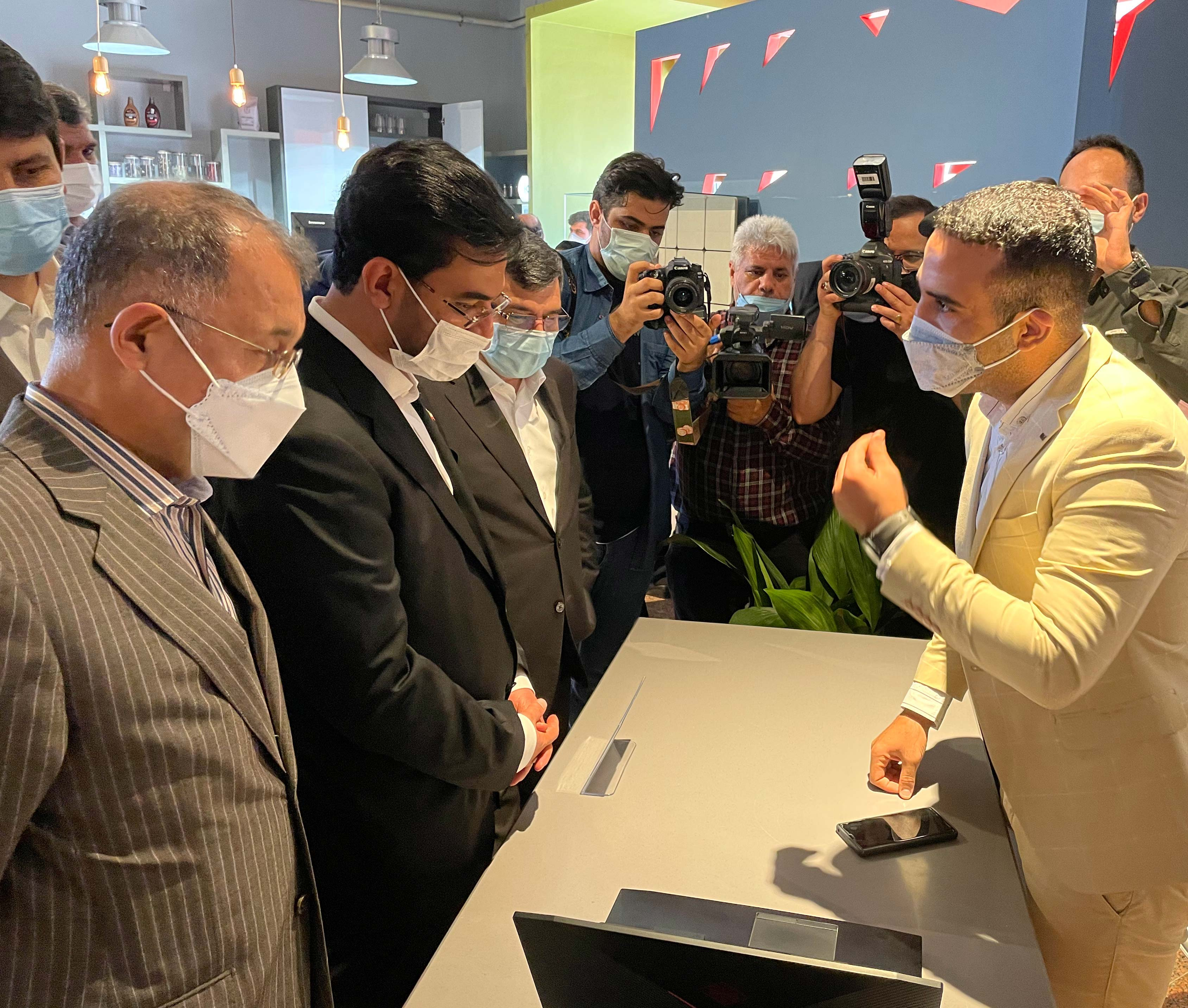
Meeting between Mohammad-Javad Azari Jahromi and Ebrahim Shafiei

One of the Iranian hackers named Ebrahim Shafiei unveiled his creation, the first Iranian hacking OS in the world, in the presence of Mohammad-Javad Azari Jahromi. This product, called "BlackWin OS," is a competitor to its American counterpart, Kali Linux. However, Ebrahim Shafiei and his team, known as the Abadal Security Team, did not receive any support from the Iranian government.

Government offices
Preceded by Mahmoud Khosravi	Vice Minister and CEO of Telecommunication Infrastructure Company; 2016–2017	Succeeded by Farhad Maarefi (acting)
Preceded by Mahmoud Vaezi	Minister of Information and Communications Technology; 2017–2021	Succeeded by Eisa Zarepour
