= Iranian National Ion Therapy Center =

Coordinates: 35°52′16.88″N 50°59′51.71″E

- مرکز ملی یون‌درمانی ایران
- Interactive map of the Iranian National Ion Therapy Center area

General information
- Status: Under construction
- Type: Medical and research center
- Classification: Specialized hospital
- Location: Karaj, Alborz Province, Iran
- Construction started: circa 2015
- Cost: ~ €200 million
- Client: Atomic Energy Organization of Iran
- Owner: Atomic Energy Organization of Iran

Technical details
- Floor area: 117,000 m²

Design and construction
- Main contractor: MedAustron (Austria) in cooperation with Iranian partners
- Known for: Iran’s first ion therapy center; first in West Asia; seventh proton-carbon therapy center worldwide

The Iranian National Ion Therapy Center (Persian: مرکز ملی یون‌درمانی ایران) is an advanced medical and research facility under construction in Karaj, Iran. It is being developed under the supervision of the Atomic Energy Organization of Iran to treat cancer patients using heavy ion beams (proton and carbon ions). This center is projected to be the first ion therapy center in Iran and West Asia, and the seventh such facility globally.

== History ==
The idea of constructing an ion therapy center in Iran was proposed in the early 2010s. In about 2015, the Atomic Energy Organization of Iran signed a cooperation agreement with the Austrian company MedAustron to build this center, with the objective of using proton and carbon beam technologies for cancer treatment.

The facility covers more than 117,000 m² in floor area, with projected costs around €200 million. Equipment testing has already taken place, and parts of the infrastructure are being fine-tuned.

== Significance ==
Ion therapy is one of the most advanced methods for cancer treatment, in which heavy ion beams are precisely directed to destroy cancerous cells while minimizing damage to surrounding healthy tissues.

== Structure ==
The center will consist of multiple units, including:

- Accelerator hall with a synchrotron
- Patient treatment rooms
- Research and training departments
- Engineering and technical support services

== Timeline ==
Construction began in the mid-2010s and the center is projected to be commissioned in 2026 (Persian year 1404).

== Related topics ==
- Atomic Energy Organization of Iran
- Radiation therapy
- Cancer treatment
