= Sabanet =

- Products: Broadband

Sabanet, Neda Gostar Saba (Persian: صبانت ندا گستر صبا) is an Iranian ISP, It started in 2003, with PAP license from MICT.In 2020 was one of top 10 Internet and broadband market companies in Iran The company also serves an IP PBX system marketed as Sabatel for coupled wires. It was ranked low as having a low download speed for FTP in 2020.
