= Islamic Labour Party =

Islamic Labour Party حزب اسلامی کار
- Secretary-General: Hossein Kamali
- Spokesperson: Mohammad Neyshabouri
- Founded: October 1998; 27 years ago
- Legalised: January 24, 1999; 27 years ago
- Headquarters: Tehran
- Trade union wing: Worker House
- Ideology: Social democracy; Islamic socialism; Islamic democracy; Labourism; Reformism
- Political position: Centre-left
- Religion: Shia Islam
- National affiliation: Council for Coordinating the Reforms Front
- Continental affiliation: International Conference of Asian Political Parties (ICAPP)
- Parliament: 0 / 290
- Tehran City Council: 0 / 21

Website
- hezbeslamikar.com

The Islamic Labour Party (Persian: حزب اسلامی کار, romanized: Hezb-e Eslâmi-ye Kâr) is a reformist party in Iran and splinter group to the trade union Worker House.

A supporter of Mohammad Khatami’s reform program, it is reportedly based on a platform of socially oriented programs and "protecting the rights of the workers and laborers".

The party has been described as either "Islamic left" or centrist within the Iranian political spectrum. It is also classified as associated with the "republican right" faction, which deals with a platform on modernization and economic growth rather than social justice, along with the Moderation and Development Party and the Executives of Construction Party. The latter is considered a historic ally of the party.

== Members ==
From 1985 to 2001, the party members Abolghasem Sarhadizadeh and Hossein Kamali held office as the minister of labour and social affairs. The minister of cooperatives, labour, and social welfare from 2013 to 2018, Ali Rabiei, is also a member of the party. The party's members have also been representatives in the Parliament of Iran.

=== Party leaders ===
Secretaries-General
Name	Tenure	Ref
Abolghasem Sarhaddizadeh	1998–2001	
Hossein Kamali	2001–	
