= Sattar Hashemi =

Iranian computer scientist (born 1976)

Seyyed Sattar Hashemi
- ستار هاشمی
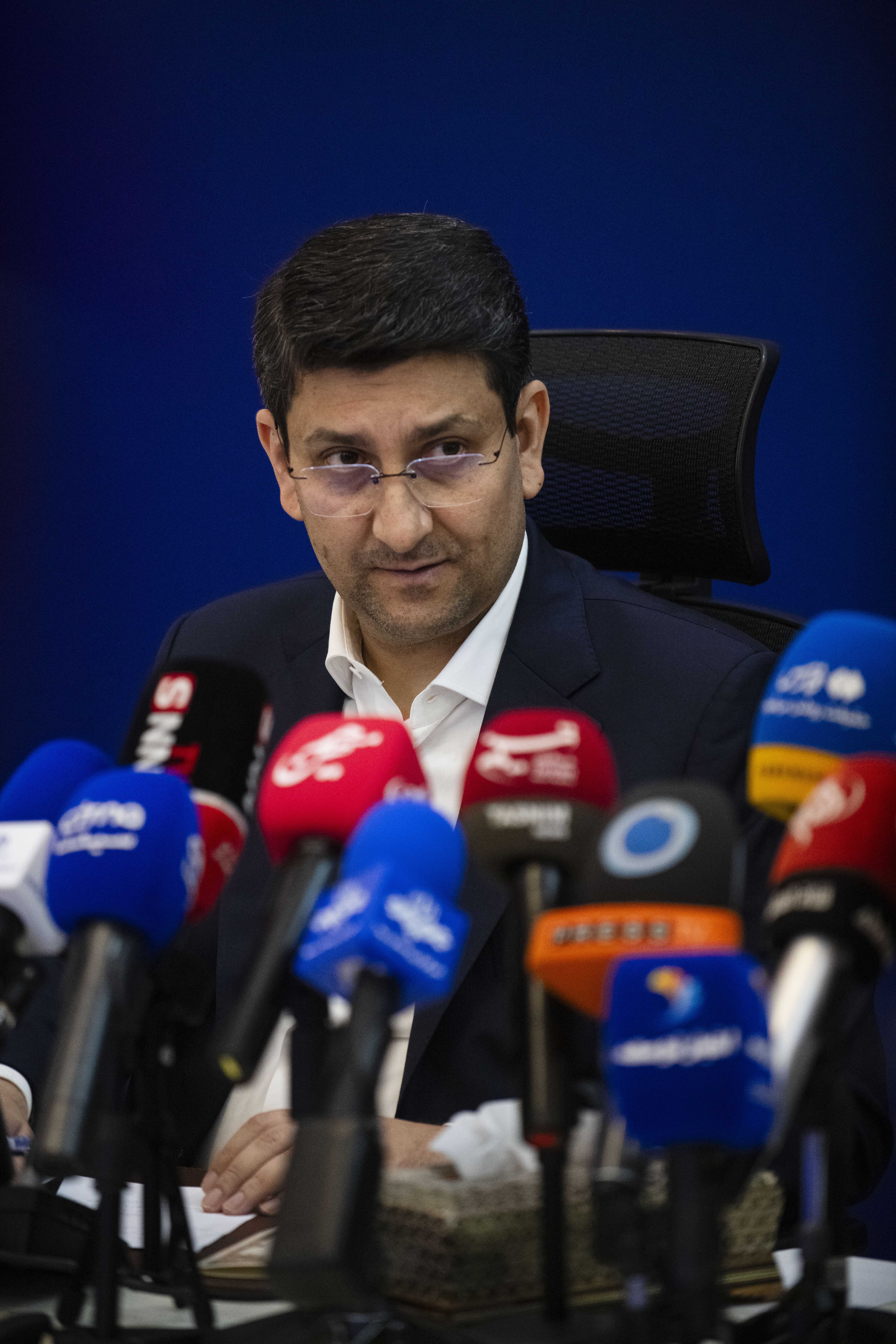
- Hashemi in 2026

Minister of Information and Communications Technology
- Incumbent
- Assumed office 21 August 2024
- President: Masoud Pezeshkian
- Preceded by: Issa Zarepour

Personal details
- Born: 1976 (age 49–50) Yasouj, Kohgiluyeh and Boyer-Ahmad, Iran
- Education: PhD in Artificial Intelligence
- Alma mater: Isfahan University of Technology (Bachelor's degree of the Computer Engineering) Iran University of Science and Technology (Master's degree) Monash University (Master's degree)

Sattar Hashemi (Persian: ستار هاشمی; born 1976) is an Iranian university professor, researcher and politician who is serving as the Minister of Information and Communications Technology of Iran since August 2024, in the Government of Masoud Pezeshkian.

== Biography ==
He was born in 1976 in Yasuj city of Kohgiluyeh and Boyer Ahmad provinces. In 1998, he completed his bachelor's degree in computer engineering majoring in hardware from Isfahan University of Technology. In 2001, Hashemi obtained his master's degree in artificial intelligence from the Iran University of Science and Technology, and in the same year, he entered the specialized doctoral program of this university, and in 1386, simultaneously from the Iran University of Science and Technology and the Monash University Australia graduated in the field of artificial intelligence.

On 21 August 2024, his candidacy for the post of minister for the Ministry of Communications and Information Technology in the Government of Masoud Pezeshkian was introduced by president Masoud Pezeshkian. His nomination was confirmed in the Islamic Consultative Assembly (the Iranian parliament) with 264 votes in favor.

== Internet blackout in Iran ==
During Hashemi’s tenure as minister, Iranian authorities imposed at least three major internet shutdowns: a near-total blackout during the June 2025 war, a nationwide shutdown beginning on 8 January 2026 amid protests, and a renewed near-total shutdown from 28 February 2026 during the war.

Reports during the 2026 internet shutdown indicated that, while the general public faced a near-total blackout, some selected users retained international internet access through a selective “whitelisting” system, including what some reports described as “white SIM cards.”
