= Ali Espahbodi =

Iranian economist and politician

- علی اسپهبدی

Minister of Labour
- In office 30 September 1979 – 6 November 1979
- Prime Minister: Mehdi Bazargan
- Preceded by: Dariush Forouhar
- Succeeded by: Mohammad Reza Nematzadeh

Personal details
- Born: Abdolali Espahbodi; 1939 (age 86–87) Mashhad, Iran
- Party: Freedom Movement of Iran (Until 1980)
- Cabinet: Bazargan Cabinet

Abdol-Ali Espahbodi (Persian: عبدالعلی اسپهبدی) is an Iranian economist and politician.
