= Issa Zarepour =

Iranian politician

Eisa Zarepour
- عیسی زارع‌پور
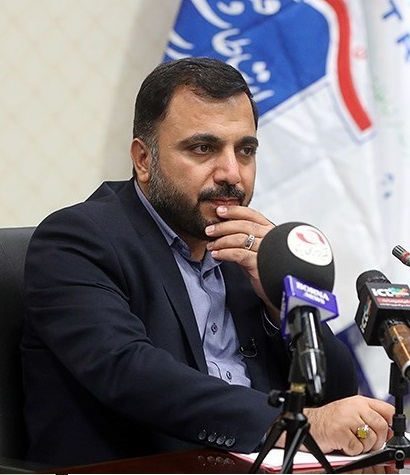
- Zarepour in 2022

Minister of Information and Communications Technology
- In office 25 August 2021 – 21 August 2024
- President: Ebrahim Raisi; Mohammad Mokhber (acting)
- Preceded by: Mohammad-Javad Azari Jahromi
- Succeeded by: Sattar Hashemi

Personal details
- Born: 1980 (age 45–46) Eslamabad-e Gharb, Kermanshah Province, Iran
- Children: 5

Eisa Zarepour (Persian: عیسی زارع پور; born 1980) is an Iranian conservative politician who has served as Minister of Information and Communications Technology from 2021 to 2024 in the government of President Ebrahim Raisi.

== Biography ==
Eisa Zarepour was born in 1980 in Eslamabad-e Gharb, Kermanshah. He received his undergraduate degree in computer engineering from Razi University and his graduate degree in computer-software engineering from Sharif University of Technology. He completed his PhD at the School of Computer Science and Engineering, University of New South Wales, Australia.

== In the ninth and tenth governments ==
At the age of 26, during the presidency of Mahmoud Ahmadinejad, he was appointed the head of the Information Technologies and Digital Media Development Center of the Ministry of Culture and Islamic Guidance, and in 2010 he was elected as the exemplary director of the Ministry of Culture and Islamic Guidance. It has also been the host of the National Cultural Network. In this capacity, he organized the National Digital Media Festival and Exhibition. Zarepour said that this center can be considered as the first active government institution and policy maker in the field of cyberspace. The Center is also responsible for developing information technology and electronic services at the Ministry of Culture and Islamic Guidance.

He has held other positions in the ninth and tenth governments and has been an advisor to the Minister of Communications, the Minister of Health, the Deputy Minister of Science and Technology. Zarepour was also a member of the National Commission for UNESCO in the 10th government.

== Complete education and statements ==
After finishing the Ahmadinejad government, Zarepour went to Australia to pursue a PhD in computer engineering – in 2016 he took the trend of Computer networks from the University of New South Wales, Australia. Zarepour also completed two postdoctoral fellowships in next generation computer networks at the University of New South Wales of Australia and Sharif University of Technology, and was a lecturer in the Computer Networks Department of the School of Computer Engineering, University of Science and Technology since 2017. His field of study is next generation computer networks and Internet of Things. Dr. The title of Zarepour's thesis is the design of efficient protocols for wireless sensor nanotechnology with the popular supervisor Hassan. Zarepour has published dozens of scientific and research articles in English in international journals and conferences, and has won several international scientific and research awards.

Zarepour has been a faculty member of the Computer Engineering Faculty of Iran University of Science and Technology since 2017. As an assistant professor in the School of Computer Engineering at the University of Science and Technology, he teaches a focus on emerging networks, the Internet of Things and wearable sensors, advanced computer networking courses, database design principles, and the Internet of Things.

Attending a distinguished meeting with the Supreme Leader of Iran in September 2017, he highlighted issues such as the need to reform the laws of knowledge-based companies and the need to combat imports in cyberspace through healthy and internal production. Zarepour himself hosted the ceremony, emphasizing that all elites in the country are "Pasdar".

Zarepour is an alternate board member of the Clean Cyberspace Developers Association (FMP). This organization presents itself as a non-governmental organization that advocates widespread filtering of polluted sites and areas for lower age groups and prioritizes the use, use and promotion of internal social networks to advance Iran's national goals.

== In the judiciary ==
Seyed Ebrahim Raisi, the then head of Judicial system of the Islamic Republic of Iran, appointed Zarepour as head of the Judiciary's Statistics and Information Technology Center in February 2020. Another of his actions during this period was the launch of the edalat hamrah app. The growth and development of other electronic systems of the judiciary, which is mentioned as one of the achievements of Ebrahim Raisi during his presidency in this branch, has also been done by Zarepour team.

== Minister of Information and Communications Technology ==
On 11 August 2021, Raisi introduced Zarepour as the proposed minister of information and communications technology of the 13th government to the parliament, and on 28 August 2021, with 256 votes in favor, 17 against and 10 abstentions, he received the vote of confidence.

== Sanctions ==
On 17 October 2022, Zarepour was added to the EU’s sanctions list for his role in shutting down internet access and prohibiting the free flow of information. This followed additional sanctions from the UK and USA.
