= Mohammad Javad Tondguyan =

Iranian engineer and politician (1950–1991)

- محمدجواد تندگویان
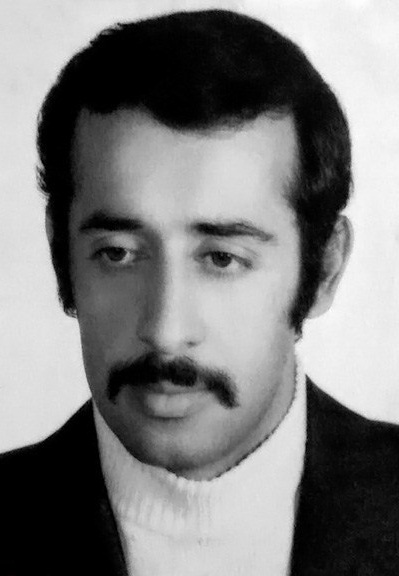

Minister of Petroleum
- In office 25 September 1980 – 17 August 1981 (Note: After Tondguyan's capture, Iranian Government did not announce a replacement for him until one year. At the time of his imprisonment at Iraqi jails, Mohsen Sadat was the acting minister.)
- Prime Minister: Mohammad Ali Rajai
- Preceded by: Ali Akbar Moinfar
- Succeeded by: Mohammad Gharazi

Personal details
- Born: 16 June 1950 Tehran, Imperial Iran
- Died: 16 December 1991 (aged 41) (Note: Date and place unclear, not any official death date and place announced by Iraqi government.) Iraq
- Resting place: Hafte Tir Mausoleum
- Party: Independent
- Spouse: Batoul Borhan Ashkevari
- Children: 4
- Education: Petroleum University of Technology (B.Sc.); Iran Center for Management Studies (M.Sc.)

Mohammad Javad Bagher Tondguyan (Persian: محمدجواد تندگویان; 16 June 1950 – 16 December 1991) was an Iranian engineer and petroleum minister under Prime Minister Mohammad-Ali Rajai from 2 September to 3 November 1980 when he was captured by the Iraqi forces in November 1980 during Iran-Iraq war and he was freed in the 16 December 1991 after 11 years of captivity but immediately killed By Iraqi forces.

== Early life and education ==
Tondguyan was born in Tehran on 16 June 1950.

Tondguyan was involved in opposition movement against Shah Mohammad Reza Pahlavi in 1967 and was detained for eleven months and interrogated by the SAVAK. During this period he met Mohammad Khatami. From 1968 Tondguyan studied oil engineering at the Abadan Technologic Institute, now Petroleum University of Technology, where he was head of the Islamic Association. The association hosted Ali Shariati, one of the philosophical and political leaders of the Islamic revolution, as a speaker during the 1960s and 1970s. Tondguyan was also one of the figures who disseminated the views of Ayatollah Ruhollah Khomeini in Abadan during this period. Tondguyan graduated from the Abadan Technologic Institute in 1972. He also attended the Iran School of Management and obtained a degree in 1978.

== Career ==
Following his graduation, Tondguyan began to work in the Tehran refinery. Then he worked for various oil companies in Iran until the 1979 revolution. After the revolution, he was appointed deputy science minister.

On 25 September 1980, Tondguyan was named oil minister replacing Ali Akbar Moinfar in the post and served in the cabinet of Mohammad Ali Rajai. His successor as the minister of oil was Mohammad Gharazi.

== Captivity and death ==
Tondguyan was captured by the Iraqi forces on his tour to the fronts on the Abadan road in Khuzestan province on 3 November 1980 at the initial phase of the Iran-Iraq war which lasted from 1980 to 1988. His deputy and a ministry official were also captured with him. They were reportedly taken to Baghdad.

In October 1990, the Iraqi officials stated that he committed suicide two years after his captivity. In November 1990, his wife and father denied this report. Tondguyan's body was delivered by the International Committee of the Red Cross to the Iran government in 1991. The committee reported that he died of torture after eleven years of detention in Iraqi prisons.

== Personal life ==
Tondguyan was married and had four children. As of 2018 his son, Mohammad Mehdi, was a member of the Tehran City Council.
