= Fatemeh Saeidi =

Iranian educator and reformist politician

Member of Parliament
- In office 28 May 2016 – 26 May 2020
- Constituency: Tehran, Rey, Shemiranat and Eslamshahr
- Majority: 1,176,905 (36.24%)

Personal details
- Born: Fatemeh Saeidi c. 1962 (age 63–64) Tehran, Iran
- Party: Executives of Construction Party
- Other political affiliations: Islamic Association of Educators
- Profession: Teacher

Fatemeh Saeidi (Persian: فاطمه سعیدی) is an Iranian educator and reformist politician who was a member of the Parliament of Iran representing Tehran, Rey, Shemiranat and Eslamshahr electoral district.

== Career ==
Saeidi is employee of Ministry of Education and works as the principal of a school in Tehran.

=== Electoral history ===
Year	Election	Votes	%	Rank	Notes
2016	Parliament	1,176,905	36.24	14th	Won
