= Parvaneh Mafi =

Iranian politician (born c. 1958)

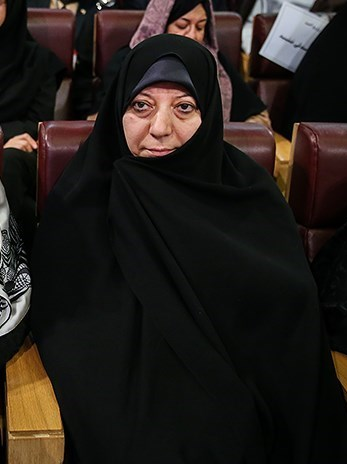

Member of the Parliament of Iran
- In office 28 May 2016 – 26 May 2020
- Constituency: Tehran, Rey, Shemiranat and Eslamshahr
- Majority: 1,162,195 (35.79%)

Personal details
- Born: c. 1958 (age 67–68) Kermanshah, Iran
- Party: Executives of Construction Party

Parvaneh Mafi (Persian: پروانه مافی) is an Iranian reformist politician and a former member of the Parliament of Iran.

She has represented Tehran, Rey, Shemiranat and Eslamshahr electoral district.

== Career ==
She was formerly governor of Shemiranat County for four years and secretary of the management committee at Expediency Discernment Council, as well as the Councils and Internal Affairs Commission.

She is a women's rights activist. She has authored works advocating women's empowerment.

=== Electoral history ===
Year	Election	Votes	%	Rank	Notes
2016	Parliament	1,162,195	35.79	19th	Won
