= Mohammad Saeedikia =

Iranian politician

- محمد سعیدی‌کیا
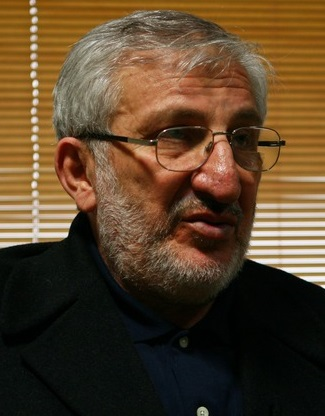

Head of Mostazafan Foundation
- In office 22 July 2014 – 22 July 2019
- Appointed by: Ali Khamenei
- Preceded by: Mohammad Forouzandeh
- Succeeded by: Parviz Fattah

Minister of Housing
- In office 24 August 2005 – 3 September 2009
- President: Mahmoud Ahmedinejad
- Preceded by: Ali Abdolalizadeh
- Succeeded by: Ali Nikzad

Minister of Jihad of Construction
- In office 20 August 1997 – 14 January 2001
- President: Mohammad Khatami
- Preceded by: Gholamreza Forouzesh
- Succeeded by: Mahmoud Hojjati (Merged in Agriculture Ministry)

Minister of Transportation
- In office 28 October 1985 – 16 August 1993
- President: Ali Khamenei; Akbar Hashemi Rafsanjani
- Prime Minister: Mir-Hossein Mousavi
- Preceded by: Hadi Nejad-Hosseinian
- Succeeded by: Akbar Torkan

Personal details
- Born: 1946 (age 79–80) Isfahan, Iran
- Education: Amirkabir University of Technology

Mohammad Saeedikia (Persian: محمد سعیدی‌کیا) (born 1946) is an Iranian politician who was the former head of Mostazafan Foundation (Foundation of the Oppressed and Disabled), from 2014 to 2019. He served as a government minister in different cabinets last of which was minister of housing and urban development from 2005 to 2009.

== Early life and education ==
Saeedikia was born in Isfahan in 1946. He received a bachelor's degree in mathematics. Then he obtained a master's degree in civil engineering from Amirkabir University of Technology in Tehran.

== Career ==
Saeedikia was the chairman of the urban planning and development corporation. Next he became deputy chief of the economic branch of the foundation of deprived. Later he served in most of the cabinets formed since the Islamic Revolution in 1979. His first cabinet post was the minister of roads and transportation. He held this post first in the cabinet led by Prime Minister Mir Hossein Mousavi from 1985 to 1989. He held the same post in the cabinet of President Akbar Hashemi Rafsanjani from 1989 to 1993. On 29 August 1989, Saeedikia was approved by the Majlis with 195 for and 43 against votes. His tenure ended in 1993.

When Mohammad Khatami became president in 1997, Saeedikia was named minister of construction. He was in office from 1997 to 2000. Then he served as advisor to Khatami from 2000 to 2005.

On 24 August 2005 President Mahmoud Ahmadinejad appointed him the minister of housing and urban development. Saeedikia won the highest for votes at the Majlis, being given 222 votes for by 284 majlis members. His term ended in 2009. He also served as the head of the Asia Pacific Ministerial Conference on Housing and Urban Development from May 2008 to August 2009. In January 2010, he was appointed deputy head of the Pars Oil Company.

He was head of the Bonyad-e Mostazafen va Janbazan (Foundation of the Oppressed and Disabled), the second-largest commercial enterprise in Iran (behind the state-owned National Iranian Oil Company) and biggest holding company in the Middle East, between years of 2014 to 2019.

=== Candidacy for 2013 elections ===
Saeedikia was the first officially announced candidate for the 2013 presidential election in Iran. He announced his candidacy in December 2012. Due to his career, he was considered to be a traditionalist principlist candidate, but in fact he was an independent and technocrat candidate. Saeedikia was also one of the dark horse candidates. His nomination was rejected by Guardian Council on 21 May 2013.
