= Mahmoud Hojjati =

Iranian politician (born 1955)

- محمود حجتی
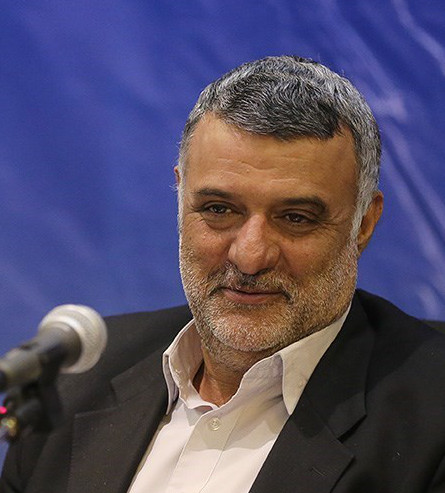
- Hojjati in 2014

Minister of Agriculture
- In office 15 August 2013 – 25 November 2019
- President: Hassan Rouhani
- Preceded by: Sadeq Khalilian
- Succeeded by: Abbas Keshavarz (acting)
- In office 14 January 2001 – 24 August 2005
- President: Mohammad Khatami
- Preceded by: Isa Kalantari (as Minister of Agriculture); Mohammad Saeedikia (as Minister of Jihad of Construction)
- Succeeded by: Mohammad-Reza Eskandari

Minister of Roads and Transportation
- In office 20 August 1997 – 14 January 2001
- President: Mohammad Khatami
- Preceded by: Akbar Torkan
- Succeeded by: Rahman Dadman

Personal details
- Born: 9 October 1955 (age 70) Najafabad, Isfahan, Iran
- Party: Islamic Iran Participation Front
- Education: Isfahan University of Technology
- Website: Governmental website

Mahmoud Hojjati (Persian: محمود حجتی, born 9 October 1955) is an Iranian politician and former Minister of Agriculture, a position he had held from January 2001 to August 2005, in the cabinet of Mohammad Khatami and again from August 2013 to November 2019 under Hassan Rouhani. He was Minister of Roads and Transportation from 1997 to January 2001, in the first three years of President Khatami's first cabinet. He was governor of Sistan and Baluchestan Province from 1989 to 1994. He is also member of central committee of Islamic Iran Participation Front.
