= Telecommunication Infrastructure Company =

Iranian telecommunication technology provider

- شرکت ارتباطات زیرساخت

Agency overview
- Formed: 1989
- Jurisdiction: Islamic Republic of Iran
- Headquarters: Shariati St, Tehran
- Agency executive: Behzad Akbari
- Parent department: Ministry of Information and Communications Technology of Iran
- Website: http://www.tic.ir/

The Telecommunication Infrastructure Company (Persian: شرکت ارتباطات زیرساخت, TIC) is responsible for telecommunication networks infrastructure in Iran. It is working as the governmental body of the Ministry of Information and Communications Technology with the aim of creating, developing, managing, organizing, supervising, maintaining and implementing the communication backbone of the country. Services provided include bandwidth providing and distribution (Internet, intranet, MPLS and VPLS), point-to-point services (inter-city, inter-provincial and international), cloud TDM service, international transit service (border to border), NIX and Peering services. Providing the internet services to mobile phone operators, ISPs, and scientific, cultural, economic and military centers are among other activities carried out by the company.
