= Ahmad Sadegh-Bonab =

Iranian politician

Ahmad Sadegh-Bonab (Persian: احمد صادق‌بناب) is an Iranian politician. He was for a short time the acting Minister of Roads and Transportation after Ahmad Khorram, the former Minister, was impeached by the Majlis on 3 October 2004.

Before the post of the supervisor of the ministry, Sadegh-Bonab was a Vice Minister of Roads and Transportation and the Iranian ambassador to Ukraine.
