= Akbar Torkan =

Iranian mechanical engineer and politician (1952–2021)

- اکبر ترکان
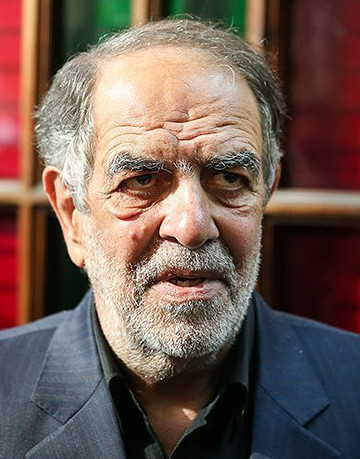
- Torkan in August 2014

Senior Advisor to the President of Iran
- In office 26 August 2013 – 1 December 2018
- President: Hassan Rouhani
- Preceded by: Mojtaba Samareh Hashemi
- Succeeded by: Vacant

Minister of Roads and Transportation
- In office 16 August 1993 – 20 August 1997
- President: Akbar Hashemi Rafsanjani
- Preceded by: Mohammad Saeedikia
- Succeeded by: Mahmoud Hojjati

8th Minister of Defence
- In office 29 August 1989 – 16 August 1993
- President: Akbar Hashemi Rafsanjani
- Preceded by: Mohammad Hossein Jalali
- Succeeded by: Mohammad Forouzandeh

Personal details
- Born: 23 September 1952 Tehran, Iran
- Died: 16 May 2021 (aged 68) Tehran, Iran
- Party: Moderation and Development Party; Executives of Construction Party
- Education: Sharif University

Akbar Torkan (Persian: اکبر ترکان; 1952–2021) was an Iranian mechanical engineer and politician, who was the President Hassan Rouhani's chief adviser from 2013 to 2018. He was the CEO of Iran's Construction Engineering Organization from 2014 to 2017. He was also the Minister of Defence and Armed Forces Logistics and Minister of Roads and Transportation in the government headed by President Akbar Hashemi Rafsanjani.

== Career and political stance ==
Torkan graduated from Sharif University of Technology. He was governor of Hormozgan, and Ilam provinces after the revolution in 1979. Even though he was a civilian, he was the head of the Defense Industries Organization during wartime. After the war he supported president Rafsanjani in his election.

He was appointed Minister of Defense in 1989 by Rafsanjani in his cabinet in his first term. He was approved by the Majlis with a majority vote, 242 for and 10 against. In second term of Rafsanjani's presidency, Torkan was appointed Minister of Roads and Transportation.

According to the Tehran Times, Torkan was one of the "trusted members of Rohani’s inner circle." The same source said that Torkan was known for his liberal views on a market economy, and that he was the deputy director of Rouhani's presidential campaign.
