= Mohammad Reza Nematzadeh =

Iranian politician

Mohammadreza Nematzadeh
- محمدرضا نعمت‌زاده
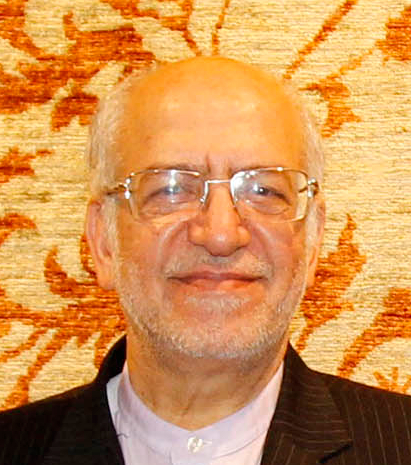
- Nematzadeh in July 2015

Minister of Industry, Mines and Business
- In office 15 August 2013 – 20 August 2017
- President: Hassan Rouhani
- Preceded by: Mehdi Ghazanfari
- Succeeded by: Mohammad Shariatmadari

Minister of Industries
- In office 29 August 1989 – 20 August 1997
- President: Akbar Hashemi Rafsanjani
- Preceded by: Gholamreza Shafeei
- Succeeded by: Gholamreza Shafeei

Minister of Industries and Mines
- In office 10 September 1980 – 17 August 1981
- President: Abulhassan Banisadr
- Prime Minister: Mohammad-Ali Rajai
- Preceded by: Mahmoud Ahmadzadeh
- Succeeded by: Mostafa Hashemitaba

Minister of Labour
- In office 17 November 1979 – 10 September 1980
- President: Abulhassan Banisadr
- Preceded by: Ali Espahbodi
- Succeeded by: Mohammad Mir-Mohammad Sadeghi

Personal details
- Born: 9 July 1945 (age 81) Tabriz, Iran
- Party: Executives of Construction Party (since 1996); Moderation and Development Party (since 1999)
- Education: California Polytechnic State University
- Awards: Order of Merit and Management (1st class)
- Website: Government website

Mohammadreza Nematzadeh (Persian: محمدرضا نعمت‌زاده, born 9 July 1945, in Tabriz) is an Iranian politician who was minister of industry of Iran since he was approved by the Iranian parliament on 15 August 2013 until 20 August 2017.

== Early life and education ==
Born in Tabriz in 1945, Nematzadeh received his elementary and secondary education in Tehran and a Bachelor of Science degree in environmental engineering from California State Polytechnic University in 1968. He was a graduate student in industrial management at the University of California (Berkeley) but was unable to continue and returned to Iran.

== Career ==
Nematzadeh was the minister of labour in 1980 and served as the minister of industry from 1980 to 1981, and again from 1989 to 1997. He also chaired the presidential campaign of the current Iranian President, Hassan Rouhani, which led to an election of Rouhani in June 2013. On 15 August, he was confirmed by the Majlis as minister of industry, mining and trade, receiving 199 Yes votes and 60 Nays. 24 Majlis members did not attend the session. He was announced on 26 July 2017 that he will not be in Rouhani's second cabinet.

== Financial corruption of offspring and relatives ==
=== Shabnam Nematzadeh ===
In the first week of August 2018, the spokesperson for Iran's Governmental Punishments Organization announced the arrest of Shabnam Nematzadeh, daughter of the former Minister of Industry, on charges of "hoarding medicine." According to the spokesperson, Nematzadeh had two cases valued at 1.2 billion and 5 billion tomans, respectively. He added that a ruling for the first case had been issued and implemented, which resulted in the destruction of all medications in her warehouse at her own expense. The second case, valued at 5 billion tomans, involved drug smuggling and remains open, having been referred to the prosecutor's office in Karaj. During court sessions, Shabnam Nematzadeh spoke very calmly, adhered to the dress code, and consistently wore a chador. In one session, the judge addressed her, saying, "Please adjust your veil so you can speak clearly, and we can hear and understand what you are saying." Defending herself and her father in court, Nemat zadeh stated, "My father was not a good father. He was a minister, but I was unemployed for five years." Following the revelation of her charges and those against her companies, she told the judge, "Bring the Quran, and I will swear on it that I am telling the truth and have committed no offense." The judge responded, "You lack honesty." Her father, Mohammad Reza Nematzadeh, arranged private meetings with the judge.

Mohammad Reza Nematzadeh, commenting on his daughter Shabnam Nematzadeh's case, said, “My daughter called me and said, "I am suffering because of being a Nematzadeh. I want to change my last name.” Shabnam Nematzadeh was convicted of corruption and widespread disruption in the country's pharmaceutical and medical system, receiving a fine of only 4 billion tomans.

In August 2018, the Public Prosecutor of Karaj denied reports of Shabnam Nematzadeh's arrest, stating that she had not even been summoned. However, the spokesperson for the Governmental Punishments Organization confirmed her arrest, noting that a 400 billion toman bail was set for Nematzadeh, which she failed to provide, leading to her detention. Earlier, some media outlets reported the discovery of a warehouse of pharmaceuticals belonging to a distribution company managed by Shabnam Nematzadeh, daughter of Mohammad Reza Nematzadeh, Minister of Industry, Mining, and Trade in Hassan Rouhani's first administration. In March 2019, approximately 1,000 square meters of unauthorized construction belonging to Shabnam Nematzadeh in Lavasanat was demolished by order of the head of the Lavasanat judicial district. She was detained again in September 2019 on charges of monopolizing pharmaceuticals and illicitly acquiring assets.

=== Ali Ashraf-Riahi ===
Ali Ashraf-Riahi, along with Zeynab Nematzadeh and Marjan Sheikholislami Al Agha, embezzled over $7.4 billion. In Tir 1399 (July 2020), Ali Ashraf-Riahi and Zeynab Nematzadeh left the country and moved to Canada. Judge Masoudi-Maqam, overseeing the case against Ashraf-Riahi, Hamzelu, and Marjan Sheikholislami, commented on their corruption case during a court session:

Regarding the funds allocated to Marjan Sheikholislami and Ashraf-Riahi, Ali Ashraf-Riahi provided some information with documentation and fled the country using a different passport. Ashraf-Riahi even presented allegations against his father-in-law (Mohammad Reza Nematzadeh) in connection with settling accounts involving Shabnam Nematzadeh in the pharmaceutical sector, offering evidence that was validated by partnersand associates.

According to Zeynab Nematzadeh, her sister Shabnam has misused her signature and name for fraudulent activities. This matter was also confirmed during Shabnam Nematzadeh's court sessions.

Party political offices
Vacant	Campaign manager of Hassan Rouhani; 2013	Succeeded by Mohammad Shariatmadari
