= Power and Water University of Technology =

Public STEM university in Iran

Technical and Engineering Campus of Shahid Beheshti University
- Established: 1972; 54 years ago
- President: Aliakbar Afzalian; Ali A Afzalian
- Administrative staff: 120
- Students: 2100
- Undergraduates: 1500
- Postgraduates: 600
- Location: Tehran, Iran; 35°44′35″N 51°34′33″E
- Colours: Heavy blue

Technical and Engineering Campus of Shahid Beheshti University (formerly known as Power and Water University of Technology) (PWUT) (Persian: دانشگاه صنعت آب و برق Dāneshgāh-e San'ate Aabo Bargh) is a state university of technology, engineering and science in Iran. PWUT is also the technical training center for power and water industries in Iran.

Approximately 120 academic staff members, with 100 labs and workshops, provide an environment for the education of trainees from regional electric companies, power plants, and water and wastewater companies. The university is in the northeast of Tehran, Iran. It is named after Hassan Abbaspour, former Iranian Minister of Energy, who was killed in the Haft-e Tir bombing on 28 June 1981.

Programs are offered at Bachelors, Masters and PhD levels. In addition, PWUT conducts a short courses aimed at upgrading or refreshing the knowledge and skills of practitioners. PWUT is accredited by the Ministry of Science, Research and Technology of Iran and administered by a board of trustees comprising academicians and representatives of national organizations professors.

== History ==
The Technical Power Systems Training Center was founded in the northeast of Tehran in 1970 to improve the knowledge of technologists and engineers employed in the power and water industries. Its activities continued on a limited level until 1980. At that time, special consideration of Hassan Abbaspour (Minister of Energy) for training experts in power and water industries and the efforts of Mohammad Sadegh Ghazizadeh, Mohammad Ahmadian and Kabir Sadeghi lead to promotion of the Technical Power Systems Training Center to a research and training center which was responsible for training to undergraduate level.

The Ministry of Science, Research, and Technology approved the institution to be changed into the Faculty of Power and Water in 1991. It was changed into Shahid Abbaspour (Power and Water) University of Technology in 2005. It also functions as a faculty under the University of Applied Science and Technology (UAST), at least for the associate degree program in Computer Software, for which UAST awards the degree, while PWUT issues the official transcript.

The university has graduate programs in Electrical, Mechanical, and Civil Engineering. In spring 2013, PW University of Technology was merged into the Shahid Beheshti University.

== Faculties ==
=== Faculty of Electrical and Computer Engineering ===
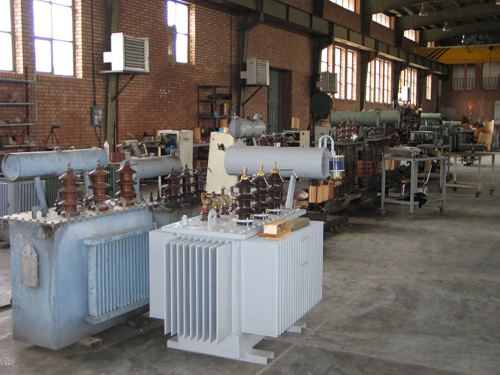
Power Systems Workshop

The Electrical and Computer Engineering faculty has three departments:

- Power Engineering Department
- Electronics & Computer Department
- Control & Instrumentation Department

The faculty has 12 laboratories, 11 specialized workshops, and 47 faculty members.

=== Faculty of Mechanical and Energy Engineering ===
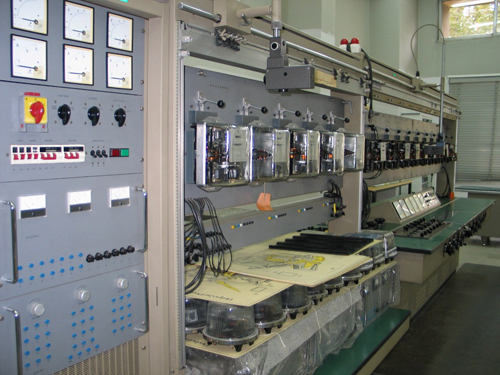
Energy Systems Laboratory

The Energy Systems Faculty has 11 laboratory units, 8 workshop units, and 13 specialized units, together with 22 faculty members. The main research areas are in the field of power plant industry and related issues like life estimation, corrosion and failure analysis, energy management, new energies, energy conversion systems including turbo-mechanism, heating systems, etc.

=== Faculty of Water (Civil) Engineering ===
Mechanical Workshop

The Faculty of Water (Civil) Engineering started its activities in 1985. Several master's degrees in Civil Engineering are offered by the faculty. The faculty has four departments:

- Water Resources Engineering
- Water and Waste water Engineering
- Structural and Geo technical Engineering
- Environmental Engineering

=== Faculty of Economics and Management ===
The faculty was created in 1991. It offers M.A. and B.A. degrees in management and accounting. Short-term courses in management and accounting for related industries are offered.

== Degree programs ==
Students are admitted through the National Entrance Examination at graduate and undergraduate levels.

=== Undergraduate degree programs ===
- Applied-Science Electrical Engineering (Power Transmission and Distribution Networks)
- Applied-Science Civil Engineering (Water and Wastewater)
- Applied-Science Engineering in Power Plant Mechanics
- Applied-Science Civil Engineering (Hydraulic Structures)
- Applied-Science Civil Engineering (Dam and Hydraulic Systems)
- B.A. in Management
- B.A. in Accounting
- B.Sc. in Computer Engineering (Software)
- B.S. in Electrical Engineering (Instrumentation and Control Systems)

=== Graduate degree programs ===
- M.Sc. in Electrical Engineering (Power Electronics and Electrical Machines)
- M.Sc. in Electrical Engineering (Power System Restructuring)
- M.Sc. in Electrical Engineering (Power Systems)
- M.Sc. in Electrical Engineering (Control Systems)
- M.Sc. in Civil Engineering (Earthquake)
- M.Sc. in Civil Engineering (Soil and Foundation)
- M.Sc. in Civil Engineering (Water and Wastewater)
- M.Sc. in Civil Engineering (Water Resources Management)
- M.Sc. in Civil Engineering (River)
- M.Sc. in Mechanical Engineering (Fluid Mechanics)
- M.Sc. in Mechanical Engineering (Solid Mechanics)
- M.Sc. in Mechanical Engineering (Electric Energy Management)
- M.Sc. in Mechanical Engineering (Power Plant)
- M.A. in Management (Electrical Energy)
- M.A. in Accounting

=== PhD degree programs ===
- PhD. in Electrical Engineering
- PhD. in Mechanical Engineering
- PhD. in Civil Engineering
- PhD. in Environment Engineering

== Notable faculty members ==
- Dr. Mohammad Ahmadian: deputy to Minister of Energy in power systems affairs
- Dr. Mohammad Sadegh Ghazizadeh: Deputy to Minister of Energy in Power Restructuring
- Dr. Ali Zabihi: chief executive officer of Social Security Organization
1. Dr. S. Kharaghani: deputy to Minister of Energy in employment and human resources
- Dr. Mojtaba Khederzadeh: Iran's top researcher in power industry (2005).
- Dr. A. Mousavi Torshizi: head of Niroo Research Institute
- Dr. G. B. Gholikandi: head of Water Research Institute
- Dr. A. Yazdizadeh: former head of Iran Energy Efficiency Organization and Ministry of Energy top researcher (2008)
- Dr. M. Meshkatodini: Ministry of Energy top researcher (2006)
- Dr. M.R. Aghamohammadi: head of Iran Dynamic Research Center (IDRC)
- Dr. A. Danandeh Mehr: Deputy Director of Institute of Postgraduate Education, Antalya Bilim University, Turkey.

== Student life ==
=== Campus ===
The campus has a small river.

=== Sport facilities ===
There are facilities for football, volleyball, swimming, wrestling, and other sports.

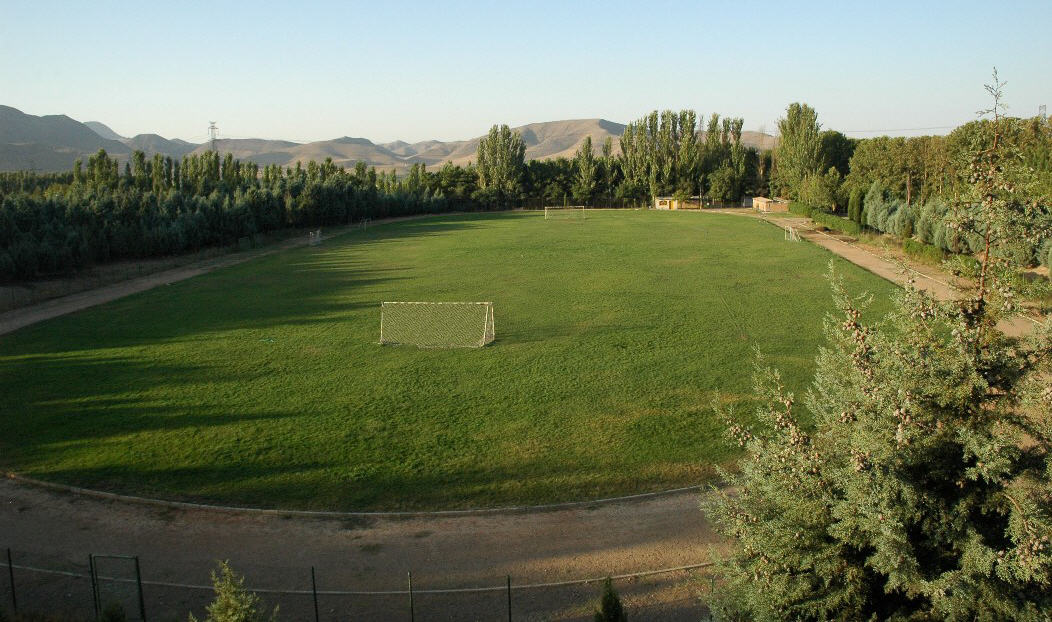
Football yard

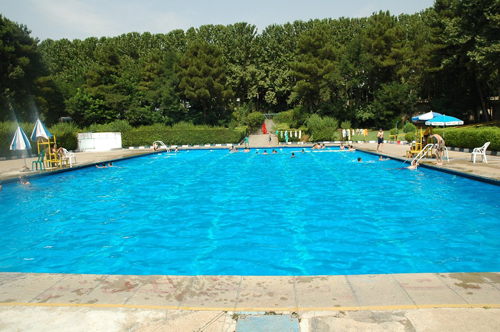
Swimming pool
