= Gholamreza Forouzesh =

Iranian engineer and politician

Member of City Council of Tehran
- In office 29 April 1999 – 15 January 2003
- Majority: 245,520 (15.35%)

Jihad of Construction Minister
- In office 20 September 1988 – 20 August 1997
- President: Ali Khamenei; Akbar Hashemi Rafsanjani
- Prime Minister: Mir-Hossein Mousavi
- Preceded by: Bijan Namdar Zangeneh
- Succeeded by: Mohammad Saeedikia

Personal details
- Born: March 1955 (age 71) Tehran, Iran
- Party: Executives of Construction Party
- Education: University of Tehran
- Profession: Mining engineer

Gholamreza Forouzesh (Persian: غلامرضا فروزش) is an Iranian engineer and politician. He served as a Tehran councilman and the cabinet minister of Jihad of Construction.
