= Hossein Kamali =

Iranian politician (born 1953)

- حسین کمالی
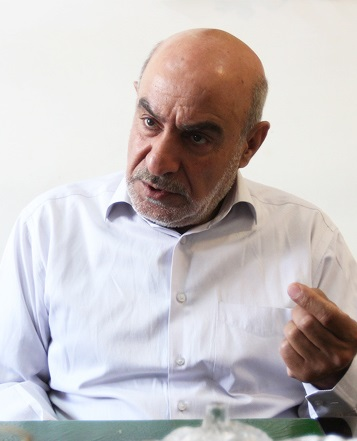

Minister of Labour and Social Affairs
- In office 29 August 1989 – 22 August 2001
- President: Akbar Hashemi Rafsanjani; Mohammad Khatami
- Preceded by: Abolghasem Sarhadizadeh
- Succeeded by: Safdar Hosseini

Personal details
- Born: July 27, 1953 (age 72) Dorud County, Lorestan Province, Iran
- Party: Islamic Labour Party
- Other political affiliations: Worker House

Hossein Kamali (Persian: حسین کمالی; born 27 July 1953) is an Iranian politician and the current secretary-general of Islamic Labour Party. He was previously Minister of Labour and Social Affairs from 1989 until 2001.

== Early life ==
Kamali was born in Dorood in 1953.

== Career ==
Kamali was the minister of labour under President Akbar Hashemi Rafsanjani, a post he retained under the government of Mohammad Khatami. In October 2012, he was nominated as a potential candidate for the presidential elections in 2013 but withdrew on 11 May 2013.

Party political offices
Preceded by Abolghassem Sarhaddizadeh	Secretary-General of Islamic Labour Party; 2001–present	Incumbent
Unknown	Secretary-General of Worker House; 1981–1990	Succeeded by Alireza Mahjoub
