= Ministry of Information and Communications Technology of Iran =

Government ministry of Iran

Ministry of Information and Communications Technology
- وزارت ارتباطات و فناوری اطلاعات; Vezârat-e Ertebâtât va Fannâvari-ye Ettelâ'ât
- The logo for the Ministry of Information and Communications Technology of Iran. Translated, the top line says "The Islamic Republic of Iran" and the bottom line says "Ministry of ICT".

- Flag of the Ministry of Information and Communications Technology

Agency overview
- Formed: 1908
- Jurisdiction: Government of the Islamic Republic of Iran
- Headquarters: Shariati St, District 7, Tehran
- Employees: 21,244 (2019)
- Minister responsible: Sattar Hashemi
- Website: www.ict.gov.ir/en/home

The Ministry of Information and Communications Technology, or the Ministry of ICT (Persian: وزارت ارتباطات و فناوری اطلاعات), established in 1908, is responsible for postal services, telephones and information technology in the Islamic Republic of Iran.

Laying out and implementing policies pertaining to postal services is the functions of the Ministry of Information and Communication Technology (ICT), which is also in charge of issuing import licenses for certain communication devices and parts thereof such as a mobile phone.

== History ==
The postal service in Iran was handled by a bureau before 1876 and all postal affairs were done by a bureau. In the same year that it was formed, it showed success in terms of social and monetary value and then in the same year this bureau was converted into a full ministry in an order issued by Naser-aldin Shah. The order stated that Amin-almolk, the Minister of Tasks and Council, was selected to execute the operations (postal services) of the Ministry of ICT. After a year working as a Minister of ICT, in 1877, he resigned from the Ministry of Tasks And Council and decided to dedicate more of his time to the Ministry of ICT. During the 19th century, the ministry was administered by Amin-almolk as the minister and Mirza Rahim as the deputy minister of ICT.

In 1882, a lithographed booklet was published, named "the Tariff of the Great Post Office of Iran". It displayed maps of the telegram offices, post offices, pony post roads and postal network in the 19th-century Iran. The booklet talked about Iran having seven main and five secondary postal lines. After the late 1800s, there were no major revision to Iranian Ministry of the Post, other than the normal organizational and structural changes. After the presidency of Amir Kabir, new renovations appeared in the post of Iran. The posts during the era of Imperialists suspended the extracurricular activities were in suspension and the postal services became fast, according to the Amir Kabir"s discipline.

The Postal services Ministry had an organization restructuring in 1906. Telegraph bureau was put under the administration of the Postal ministry and the Ministry of Post and Telegraph formed. The first telephone patent assigned to Basir-ol-mamalek in 1900 and since then the telephone services started working in Tehran. In 1929, the Ministry of Postal and Telegraph offered a proposal to the parliament for purchasing the stocks of the only Telephone Company. Then the Ministry of Post, Telegraph, and Telephone was formed after the government purchased the stocks of the only Telephone Company.

After the 1929, many development projects were done to the ministry until 2003. There were several subsidiary company and centers which went through many evolutions and were able to spread communication solutions inside Iran. In 2003, a bill of duties and responsibilities in the parliament of Iran decided to rename the ministry from "Ministry of P.T.T" to "Ministry of I.C.T". The Bill also brought a structural reform to the Ministry of I.C.T. It contained new laws and mandates from the Parliament. Thus three private companies: Data Communication Company, acquired by the I.C.T in 2005 and T.I.C and M.C.I were established beside T.C.I. Some of the evolutions are establishing T.C.I and I.R.I Post Company as well as organizing two organizations named I.S.A and C.R.A, and also working to build two new councils named "High Council of IT" and "Space Council".

== Programs ==
As of January 2025, the combined number of users across Iranian messaging apps exceeded 100 million due to their connection to the Message Exchange Bus (MXB), which links all the messaging apps together. This system was developed by the ministry.

The ministry created radar.game and 403.online in 2022 allowing access to games and foreign sites, Iran had two million homes with fiber optical connected internet.

The ministry has deployed a what it calls "Professional Internet" for some corporations which is internet without National Information Network. The government also controls internet speed access.

It also had supported cloud messaging apps it has interlinked and compared it with Digital Markets Act.

The ministry mainly selects Chinese corporations for imported technology parts for their quality.

According to Foreign Policy the ministry helps mass surveillance and repression mostly. Their ministers have been sanctioned by foreign governments on several occasions.

It has developed national information network registration site.

== Workgroup ==
The minister is a part of special taskforce for the digital economy.

== Chart ==
Departments and agencies working throughout the ministry include Iranian Space Research Center, Telecommunication Company of Iran, Telecommunication Infrastructure Company.

- MICT
  - dept planning
  - research
  - executive

== List of ministers ==
No.	Portrait	Name	Took office	Left office	Party	Government
1	No image	Mohammad Hassan Eslami	22 February 1979	4 November 1979	Independent	Interim Government
2	No image	Mahmoud Ghandi	28 November 1979	28 June 1981	Islamic Republican Party	Interim Government Rajai
3		Morteza Nabavi	17 August 1981	28 October 1985	Islamic Republican Party	Bahonar Interim Government Mousavi I
4		Mohammad Gharazi	28 October 1985	20 August 1997	Independent	Mousavi II Rafsanjani I Rafsanjani II
5		Mohammad Reza Aref	20 August 1997	17 June 2000	Islamic Iran Participation Front	Khatami I
6		Ahmad Motamedi	14 January 2001	24 August 2005	Independent	Khatami I Khatami II
7		Mohammad Soleimani	24 August 2005	3 September 2009	Independent	Ahmadinejad I
8		Reza Taghipour	3 September 2009	2 December 2012	Independent	Ahmadinejad II
9		Mohammad-Hassan Nami	26 February 2013	15 August 2013	Military	Ahmadinejad II
10		Mahmoud Vaezi	15 August 2013	20 August 2017	Moderation and Development Party	Rouhani I
11		Mohammad-Javad Azari Jahromi	20 August 2017	25 August 2021	Independent	Rouhani II
12		Issa Zarepour	25 August 2021	21 August 2024	Independent	Raisi
13		Sattar Hashemi	21 August 2024	Current	Independent	Pezeshkian

== See also ==
- Communications in Iran
- Internet in Iran
- Telecommunication Company of Iran (TCI)
- Iranian Space Agency
