= Ahmad Khorram =

Iranian politician

Ministry of Roads and Transportation
- In office 22 August 2001 – 3 October 2004
- President: Mohammad Khatami
- Preceded by: Rahman Dadman
- Succeeded by: Ahmad Sadegh-Bonab (acting)

Governor of Khuzestan province
- In office 19 September 1997 – 1 November 1999
- Preceded by: Mohammad-Hossein Moghimi
- Succeeded by: Abdulhassan Moghtadaei

Personal details
- Born: Ahmad Khorram; 1950 (age 75–76) Isfahan, Iran
- Party: Islamic Iran Participation Front
- Education: University of Tabriz

Ahmad Khorram (Persian: احمد خرم, born 1950) is an Iranian politician.

Khorram was the Minister of Roads and Transportation under President Mohammad Khatami, until 3 October 2004, when he was impeached by the Majlis of Iran by 188 votes out of 258 present members of the parliament. He was replaced by Ahmad Sadegh-Bonab, as the temporary supervisor of the ministry.

Born in Chaharmahal va Bakhtiari, and having a bachelor's degree in Roads and Structures Engineering from the University of Tabriz, Khorram's previous posts in the Iranian government, include the governorship of Hormozgan, Khuzestan, and Hamedan and vice ministership of the Ministry of Roads and Transportation.
