= Reza Amrollahi =

Iranian physicist

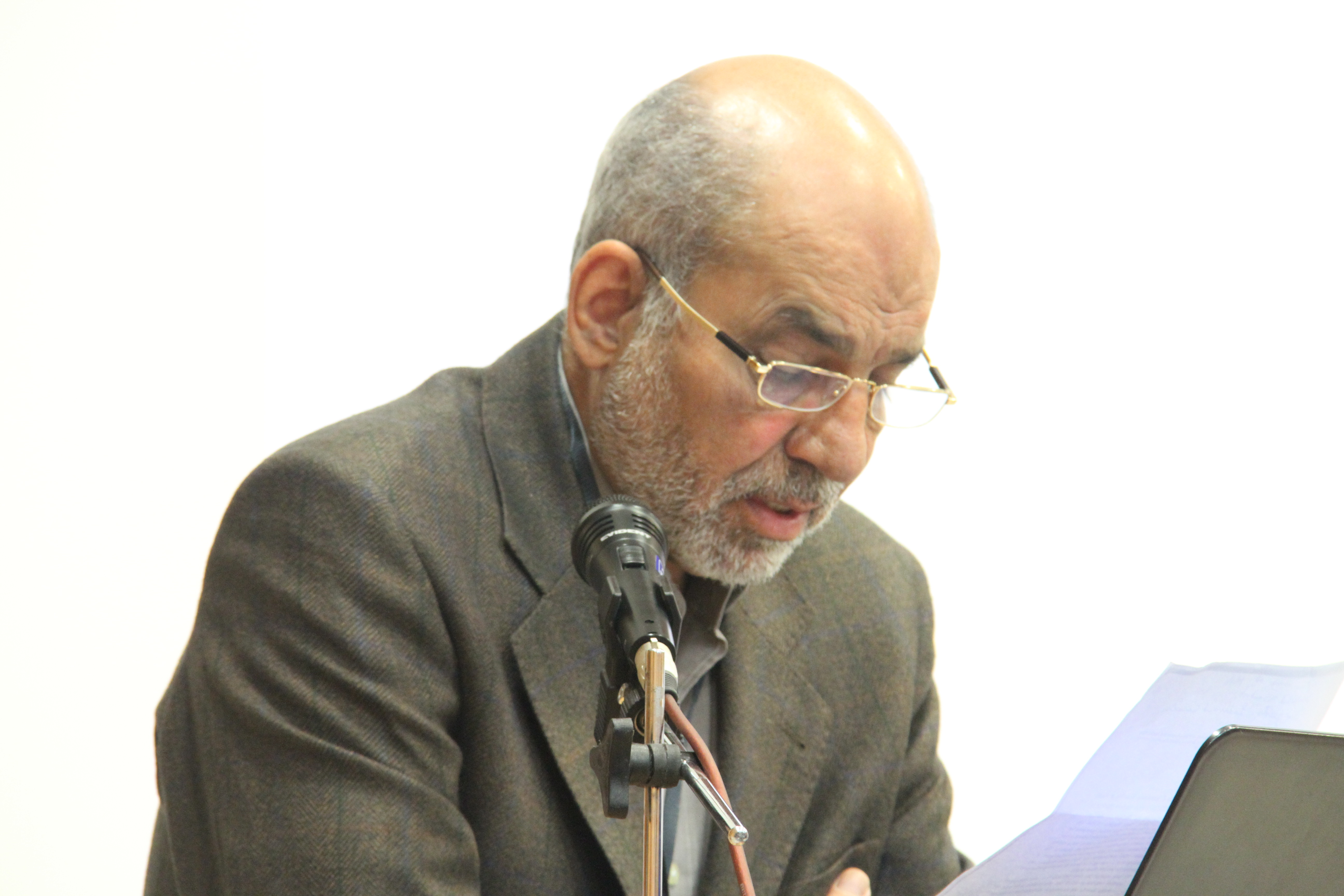
- Born: 9 August 1946 (age 79); Yazd, Iran
- Occupations: Physicist, professor
- Political party: Executives of Construction Party

Reza Amrollahi (Persian: رضا امراللهی) is a physicist and professor.

== Biography ==
He was the professor of some of the Iranian universities such as Khaje Nasir University and Amir Kabir university. Reza Amrollahi was the president of the Atomic Energy Organization of Iran and the second in the administration of President of Iran from 1981 to 1997.

== See also ==
- Atomic Energy Organization of Iran
