= Gholam Reza Aghazadeh =

Iranian politician

- غلامرضا آقازاده
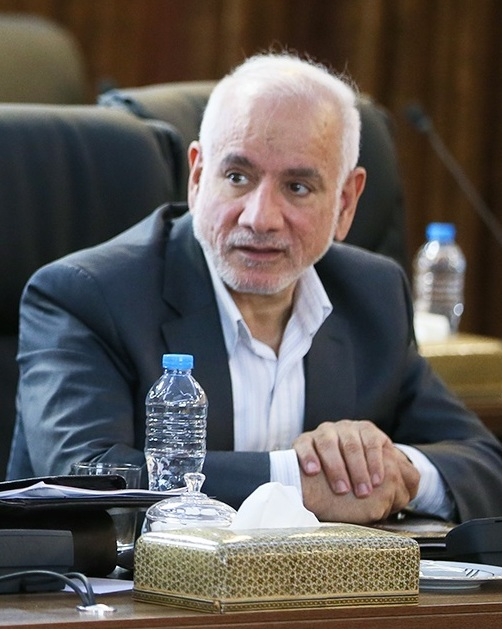
- Aghazadeh in 2018

Member of Expediency Discernment Council
- Incumbent
- Assumed office 17 March 1997
- Appointed by: Ali Khamenei
- Chairman: Akbar Hashemi Rafsanjani; Ali Movahedi-Kermani (Acting); Mahmoud Hashemi Shahroudi; Sadeq Larijani

Head of the Atomic Energy Organization
- In office 1 September 1997 – 16 July 2009
- President: Mohammad Khatami; Mahmoud Ahmadinejad
- Preceded by: Reza Amrollahi
- Succeeded by: Ali Akbar Salehi

Minister of Petroleum
- In office 28 October 1985 – 20 August 1997
- President: Ali Khamenei; Akbar Hashemi Rafsanjani
- Prime Minister: Mir-Hossein Mousavi
- Preceded by: Mohammad Gharazi
- Succeeded by: Bijan Namdar Zangeneh

Personal details
- Born: 15 March 1949 (age 77) Khoy, Iran
- Party: Executives of Construction Party
- Education: University of Tehran

Gholam Reza Aghazadeh (Persian: غلامرضا آقازاده; born 15 March 1949) is an Iranian politician. Aghazadeh served as the Vice President for Atomic Energy of the Islamic Republic of Iran and the president of the Atomic Energy Organization of Iran from September 1997 until his resignation in July 2009. He is currently member of the Expediency Discernment Council.

He has a Bachelor of Science in Accounting and Computer Engineering from University of Tehran. He was an active member of the opposition, and in 1979 he became a director of the ultra-populist IRP newspaper Jomhouri-e Eslami, run by Mir-Hossein Mousavi. In 1980, Mousavi became foreign minister and made Aghazadeh his deputy in charge of economic relations and finance.

Two years later, as Mousavi became prime minister, Aghazadeh was made state minister for executive affairs, a post attached to the prime minister's office. Later he held the title of deputy prime minister for executive affairs in charge of Iran's oil barter deals with foreign states and companies under a countertrade system started in 1982. He coordinated policies of various ministries through the PM's office. His talents earned him the post of Iran's Minister of Petroleum in October 1985. He held this position until 1997 when he was replaced by Bijan Namdar Zanganeh after the election of the reformist president Mohammad Khatami. He was then promoted to the post of Vice President for Atomic Energy. He held this position from 1997 to 2009.

On 16 July 2009, the semi-official Iranian Students News Agency reported that Gholam Reza Aghazadeh had resigned as Iran's Nuclear Chief for unspecified reasons, a resignation of intense interest in such a difficult time. There has been speculation that he resigned following shutdowns and failures in Iran's nuclear program caused by the Stuxnet virus.

== See also ==
- Atomic Energy Organization of Iran
- Mahmoud Ahmadinejad
- Saeed Jalili
- Mohammad Khatami
- Ali Larijani
- Hassan Rowhani

Political offices
Preceded by Mohammad Gharazi	Minister of Petroleum; 1985–1997	Succeeded by Bijan Namdar Zanganeh
Preceded by Reza Amrollahi	Head of Atomic Energy Organization; 1997–2009	Succeeded by Ali Akbar Salehi
