= Abolghasem Sarhaddizadeh =

Iranian politician (c. 1945–2020)

- ابوالقاسم سرحدی‌زاده
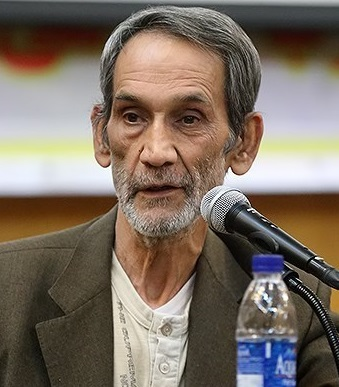

Member of the Parliament of Iran
- In office 28 May 1996 – 28 May 2004
- Constituency: Tehran, Rey, Shemiranat and Eslamshahr
- Majority: 926,054 (31.59%)
- In office 11 November 1990 – 28 May 1992
- Constituency: Tehran, Rey, Shemiranat and Eslamshahr
- Majority: 614,230 (51.9%)

Minister of Labour and Social Affairs
- In office 28 August 1983 – 29 August 1989
- President: Ali Khamenei
- Prime Minister: Mir-Hossein Mousavi
- Preceded by: Ahmad Tavakoli
- Succeeded by: Hossein Kamali

Personal details
- Born: c. 1945 Tehran, Iran
- Died: July 14, 2020 (aged 75) Tehran, Iran
- Party: Islamic Labour Party; Worker House
- Other political affiliations: Islamic Republican Party

Abolghasem Sarhaddizadeh (Persian: ابوالقاسم سرحدی‌زاده; c. 1945 – July 14, 2020) was an Iranian reformist politician who served as a member of the Parliament of Iran for three terms representing Tehran, Rey, Shemiranat and Eslamshahr. Sarhaddizadeh also served as Minister of Labour and Social Affairs from 1983 to 1989.

Party political offices
New title Party established	Secretary-General of Islamic Labour Party; 1998–2001	Succeeded by Hossein Kamali
New title	Head of Islamic Labour Party's parliamentary group 2000–2004	Vacant
