= Mohammad Gharazi =

Iranian politician

Seyyed Mohammad Gharazi
- محمد غرضی
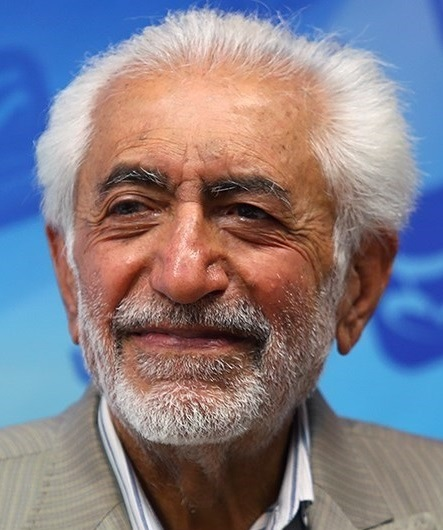
- Gharazi in 2021

Minister of Information and Communications Technology
- In office 28 October 1985 – 20 August 1997
- President: Ali Khamenei; Akbar Hashemi Rafsanjani
- Prime Minister: Mir-Hossein Mousavi
- Preceded by: Morteza Nabavi
- Succeeded by: Mohammad Reza Aref

Minister of Petroleum
- In office 17 August 1981 – 28 October 1985
- President: Mohammad-Ali Rajai; Ali Khamenei
- Prime Minister: Mohammad-Javad Bahonar; Mohammad-Reza Mahdavi Kani; Mir-Hossein Mousavi
- Preceded by: Mohammad Javad Tondguyan
- Succeeded by: Gholam Reza Aghazadeh

Governor of Khuzestan province
- In office 2 January 1980 – July 1981
- Preceded by: Ahmad Madani
- Succeeded by: Mohammad-Hassan Tavallayi

Member of the Parliament of Iran
- In office 12 August 1981 – 15 August 1981
- Preceded by: Ahmad Salamatian
- Succeeded by: Ahmad Salek
- Constituency: Isfahan
- Majority: 237,443 (77.5%)

Member of the City Council of Tehran
- In office 29 April 1999 – 3 January 2000
- Majority: 192,211 (13.69%)

Personal details
- Born: 12 February 1942 (age 84) Isfahan, Imperial State of Iran
- Party: Independent
- Other political affiliations: Executives of Construction Party (1990s); People's Mojahedin (1970s)
- Spouse: Razieh Salimi
- Education: University of Tehran

Mohammad Gharazi (Persian: محمد غرضی, also spelled Mohammad Qarazi) is an Iranian politician who served as Minister of Petroleum from 1981 to 1985 and Minister of Post and Telecommunications from 1985 to 1997. He was also a member of the Iranian Parliament from 1980 to 1984 and also governor of Khuzestan province. He was an independent candidate in the 2013 presidential election.

== Early life and education ==
He was born on 12 February 1942 in Shahreza, Isfahan province. He studied electronics at the University of Tehran. He later moved to France but was back to his home country and was arrested by SAVAK in 1972.

== Career ==
Gharazi began his political career in 1974 and was exiled to Iraq by Shah's government. In 1976, he joined the Mojahedin-e-Khalq Organization (MKO). He accompanied Ruhollah Khomeini on his trip from Paris to Tehran. Following the establishment of the Islamic republic, Gharazi was appointed governor of Kurdistan province and later Khuzestan province. He was elected as member of the Iranian Parliament in 1980 election. He later was appointed minister of petroleum by the then Prime Minister Mir-Hossein Mousavi, replacing Mohammad Javad Tondguyan in the post. He held this post until 1985, when he became minister of post (currently Communication). He resigned from office in 1997 after election of Mohammad Khatami. He was also a member of City Council of Tehran from 1999 to 2000.

=== 2013 presidential campaign ===
Gharazi ran for President of Iran as an independent in the 2013 election, having announced his candidacy on 8 May 2013. His candidacy was approved by Guardian Council. He was the only independent candidate approved to run in the presidential election. However, he was regarded as one of the dark horses in the election. He won the sixth place in the election, receiving only 446,015 votes.

=== Electoral history ===
Year	Election	Votes	%	Rank	Notes
1980	Parliament	306,145	77.5	1st	Won
1999	City Council of Tehran	192,211	12.98	15th	Won
2000	Parliament				Lost
2013	President	446,015	1.22	6th	Lost
2016	Assembly of Experts	–			Disqualified
2016	Parliament	24,150	0.74	68th	Lost
2017	President	–			Disqualified

Political offices
Preceded by Mohammad Javad Tondguyan	Minister of Petroleum; 1981–1985	Succeeded by Gholam Aghazadeh
Preceded by Morteza Nabavi	Minister of Post; 1985–1997	Succeeded by Mohammad-Reza Aref
