= Atomic Energy Organization of Iran =

Iranian government agency

- سازمان انرژی اتمی
- The AEOI logo
- Established: 1974
- Type: Organization
- Legal status: Active
- Headquarters: North Karegar Avenue, Tehran, Iran
- Head: Mohammad Eslami
- Website: www.aeoi.org.ir

The Atomic Energy Organization of Iran (AEOI, Persian: سازمان انرژی اتمی) is the main Iranian government agency responsible for operating nuclear energy and nuclear fuel cycle installations in Iran. The AEOI is the primary organization responsible for nuclear technology research and development activities in Iran. The AEOI was involved in formerly undeclared nuclear activities including enrichment facilities at Fordow and Natanz.

The AEOI's headquarters are in the northern Amir Abad district in Tehran, but it has facilities throughout Iran. The current head of the AEOI is Mohammad Eslami, who replaced Ali Akbar Salehi on 29 August 2021. By 2024, Iran's nuclear industry sector employed more than 25,000 specialists, of which around 40% were women.

== Nuclear power plans ==
In July 2023, the AEOI Head Mohammed Eslami said that Iran planned to build nuclear power plants generating 20 GW in Khuzestan, Bushehr, Sistan, Hormozgan, and Baluchistan.

== Schools ==
There are thirteen atomic energy highschools and primary elementary schools.

== Research centers ==
- Photonics and quantum technologies institute. Formerly a laser research center, created in 1976.

== Divisions ==
- Nuclear Fuel Production Division (NFPD): Research and development on the nuclear fuel cycle, including uranium exploration, mining, milling, conversion, and nuclear waste management; departments include Jaber Ibn Hayan Research Dept., Exploration and Mining Dept., Benefication and Hydrometallurgical Research Center, Nuclear Fuel Research and Production Center, Waste Management Dept., and Saghand Mining Dept.
- Nuclear Power Plant Division (NPPD): Responsible for planning, construction, commissioning, decommissioning and nuclear safety of nuclear power plants in Iran.
- Engineering and Technical Supervision Department (ETSD): Design, review, evaluation and approval of engineering and technical documents, participation and quality control.
- Research Division: Responsible for planning and guiding research projects; has eight affiliated research centers: Nuclear Research Center, Research Center for Lasers and their Application; Nuclear Fusion Research Center, Gamma Irradiation Center, Center for Renewable Energy Development, Nuclear Research Center for Agriculture and Medicine (Karaj), Yazd Radiation Processing Center, and Bonab Research Center.
- International Affairs Department (IAD): Oversees cooperation with AEOI counterparts abroad and drafts documents on AEOI policies; maintains a delegation at the IAEA in Vienna, Austria and one in Moscow, Russia.

== Sanctions ==
The AEOI is subject to international sanctions by several nations. The organization since 2018 has been sanctioned by United States Department of the Treasury under the Office of Foreign Assets Control and was placed on the Specially Designated Nationals and Blocked Persons List along with sanctioning 23 AEOI subsidiaries and several individuals associated with AEOI meeting the definition of government of Iran under Executive Order 13599.

Australia, France, South Africa, and Turkey have placed sanctions against the AEOI under United Nations Security Council Resolution 1737 which was adopted in 2006 since 2025. Belgium in 2025 placed sanctions through European Union sanctions against Iran per resolution 1737. Other countries that have placed sanctions in 2025 are the United Kingdom, Switzerland, Ukraine, Japan, Monaco. Israel has placed sanctions since 2018.

== Presidents ==
#	Name	Term
1	Akbar Etemad	1974–1979
	Ahmad Sotoudehnia (Acting)	1979–1980
	Fereydun Sahabi (Acting)	1980–1981
2	Reza Amrollahi	1981–1997
3	Gholam Reza Aghazadeh	1997–2009
4	Ali Akbar Salehi	2009–2010
	Mohammad Ahmadian (Acting)	2010–2011
5	Fereydoon Abbasi	2011–2013
6	Ali Akbar Salehi (second term)	2013–2021
7	Mohammad Eslami	2021–present

== See also ==
- Nuclear program of Iran
- List of Iranian nuclear negotiators
- Nuclear Command Corps, a unit of the Islamic Revolutionary Guard Corps tasked to protect Iranian nuclear facilities

General:

- Science in Iran
- Energy of Iran
