= Gholamreza Shafeei =

Iranian politician

- غلامرضا شافعی
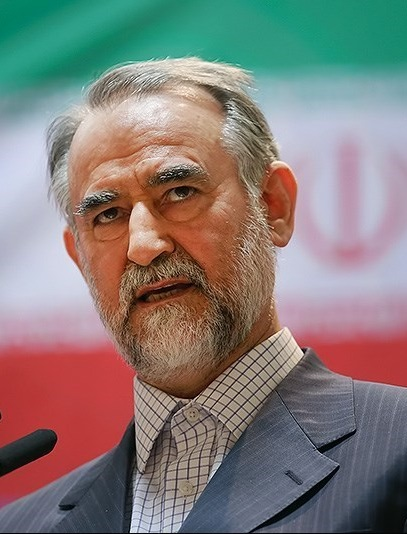

Minister of Industries
- In office 20 August 1997 – 14 January 2001
- President: Mohammad Khatami
- Preceded by: Mohammadreza Nematzadeh
- Succeeded by: Eshaq Jahangiri (as Minister of Industries and Mines)
- In office 20 August 1984 – 29 August 1989
- President: Ali Khamenei
- Prime Minister: Mir-Hossein Mousavi
- Preceded by: Mostafa Hashemitaba
- Succeeded by: Mohammadreza Nematzadeh

Minister of Cooperatives
- In office 31 December 1991 – 20 August 1997
- President: Akbar Hashemi Rafsanjani
- Preceded by: Position established
- Succeeded by: Morteza Haji

Ambassador of Iran to Russia
- In office 2001–2005
- President: Mohammad Khatami
- Preceded by: Mehdi Safari
- Succeeded by: Gholamreza Ansari

Personal details
- Born: 1951 (age 74–75) Marand, Iran
- Party: Executives of Construction Party
- Education: Sharif University of Technology

Gholamreza Shafeei (Persian: غلامرضا شافعی, born 1951) is an Iranian politician, vice president of strategic monitoring and president of management and planning in the cabinet of Hassan Rouhani and former Ambassador of Iran to Russia.
