= Executives of Construction Party =

Reformist political party in Iran

Executives of Construction Party حزب کارگزاران سازندگی ایران
- General Secretary: Hossein Marashi
- Spokesperson: Hossein Marashi
- Spiritual leader: Akbar Hashemi Rafsanjani (deceased)
- Head of Council: Mohsen Hashemi Rafsanjani
- Founder: 1996 Signatories: 1. Esmail Shooshtari; 2. Ataollah Mohajerani; 3. Mohsen Nourbakhsh; 4. Mohammad Hashemi Rafsanjani; 5. Mohammad Ali Najafi; 6. Morteza Mohammadkhan; 7. Issa Kalantari; 8. Akbar Torkan; 9. Mohammad Gharazi; 10. Bijan Namdar Zangeneh; 11. Gholamhossein Karbaschi; 12. Reza Amrollahi; 13. Gholamreza Forouzesh; 14. Mostafa Hashemitaba; 15. Gholamreza Shafeei; 16. Mohammad Reza Nematzadeh; 1999 Founding board: 1. Mohammad Hashemi Rafsanjani; 2. Ataollah Mohajerani; 3. Mohsen Nourbakhsh; 4. Mohammad Ali Najafi; 5. Hossein Marashi; 6. Faezeh Hashemi Rafsanjani; 7. Reza Amrollahi
- Founded: 17 January 1996; 30 years ago
- Legalised: 15 August 1999; 27 years ago
- Split from: Islamic Right
- Headquarters: Tehran, Iran
- Newspaper: Kargozaran (2005–2008); Sazandegi (since 2018)
- Ideology: Reformism; Technocracy; Pragmatism; Economic liberalism Moderate conservatism Islamic democracy Modern Right
- Political position: Centre-right
- Religion: Islam
- National affiliation: Pragmatists; Reformists
- Slogan: Islamic Pride and Development of Iran
- Government: 1 / 33
- Parliament: 1 / 290
- Expediency Council: 1 / 48
- City Councils: 5 / 320

Website
- www.kargozaran.net/fa/

The Executives of Construction of Iran Party (Note: Transliterated Hezb-e Kargozaran-e Sazandegi-e Iran. The party's name has been alternately translated "Servants of Construction Party".) (Persian: حزب کارگزاران سازندگی ایران, romanized: Hezb-e Kārgozārān-e Sāzandegi-ye Irān) is a reformist political party in Iran, founded by 16 members of the cabinet of the then President Akbar Hashemi Rafsanjani in 1996. The party is a member of Council for Coordinating the Reforms Front.

== Views and factions ==
Economically, the party supports free markets and industrialization, with a high emphasis on progress and development. The party takes the view that economic freedom is fundamentally linked to cultural and political freedom, but it should not be allowed to conflict with development. The party is divided into two factions in constant struggle, the more conservative "Kermani faction" led by Mohammad Hashemi Rafsanjani and Hossein Marashi, and the more liberal "Isfahani faction" led by Mohammad Atrianfar and Gholamhossein Karbaschi.

== Members ==
=== Founders ===
The party was formed in 1996. The following sixteen people were its founders; they signed the declaration of its formation. The founding board members registering the party with the Ministry of Interior in 1999 are marked in the rightmost column.

Name	1996	1999
Esmail Shooshtari	✓	—N/a
Ataollah Mohajerani	✓	✓
Mohsen Nourbakhsh	✓	✓
Mohammad Hashemi Rafsanjani	✓	✓
Mohammad Ali Najafi	✓	✓
Morteza Mohammadkhan	✓	—N/a
Issa Kalantari	✓	—N/a
Akbar Torkan	✓	—N/a
Mohammad Gharazi	✓	—N/a
Bijan Namdar Zangeneh	✓	—N/a
Gholamhossein Karbaschi	✓	—N/a
Reza Amrollahi	✓	✓
Gholamreza Forouzesh	✓	—N/a
Mostafa Hashemitaba	✓	—N/a
Gholamreza Shafeei	✓	—N/a
Mohammad Reza Nematzadeh	✓	—N/a
Hossein Marashi	—N/a	✓
Faezeh Hashemi Rafsanjani	—N/a	✓

=== Party leaders ===
Secretaries general
Name	Tenure	Ref
Gholamhossein Karbaschi	1998–2021	
Hossein Marashi	2021–present	

Deputy secretaries-general
Name	Tenure	Ref
Hossein Marashi	1999–2014	
Saeed Laylaz	2014–2019	
Alireza Siasirad	2019–present	

Heads of Central Council
Name	Tenure	Ref
Mohammad-Ali Najafi	1998–2014	
Eshaq Jahangiri	2014–2017	
Mohsen Hashemi Rafsanjani	2017–present	

Spokespersons
Name	Tenure	Ref
Hossein Marashi	2006–present	

Political Chief
Name	Tenure	Ref
Mohammad Ghoochani	2025–present	

=== Current officeholders ===
Cabinet

- Eshaq Jahangiri (First Vice President)
- Bijan Namdar Zanganeh (Minister of Petroleum)
- Isa Kalantari (Vice President for Environment)

Parliament

- Parvaneh Mafi (Tehran, Rey, Shemiranat and Eslamshahr)
- Fatemeh Saeidi (Tehran, Rey, Shemiranat and Eslamshahr)
- Abdolreza Hashemzaei (Tehran, Rey, Shemiranat and Eslamshahr)
- Nahid Tajeddin (Isfahan)
- Mohammad-Bagher Sa'adat (Dashtestan)
- Masoud Rezaei (Shiraz)
- Vali Maleki (Meshginshahr)

Local

- Mohsen Hashemi Rafsanjani (Chairman of Tehran City Council)
- Shakur Akbarnejad (Chairman of Tabriz City Council)
