= Hassan Rouhani 2017 presidential campaign =

Iranian presidential campaign

- Campaign: 2017 Iranian presidential election
- Candidate: Hassan Rouhani; President of Iran
- Affiliation: Moderation and Development Party
- Status: Launched: 6 March 2017; Registered: 14 April 2017; Won election: 20 May 2017
- Headquarters: Number 222, 26th Alley, Farhang Square, Yusef Abad, Tehran, Iran
- Key people: Mohammad Shariatmadari (Chairman); Morteza Bank (Provincial Affairs Head); Mohammad Ali Najafi (Think Tank Head); Mohammad Ali Vakili (Spokesperson); Morteza Haji (Campaign chief in Tehran); Ali Jannati (MDP Election Headquarters Head); Ashraf Borojerdi (Women's Headquarters); Reza Farajidana (Educators' Headquarters); Mohammad Kabiri (Youth's Headquarters); Hojatollah Ayoubi (Artists' Headquarters)
- Slogan(s): Again Iran, Again Rouhani دوباره ایران؛ دوباره روحانی; Freedom, security, peace and progress آزادی، امنیت، آرامش و پیشرفت
- Theme song: "Bist Hezar Arezoo" by Mohsen Chavoshi; "Avaye Ordibehesht" by Saeed Modares; "Dobare Iran" by Hojat Ashrafzadeh; "Tekrar Mikonad" by Soroush Golshani; "Iran Banafsh" by Amir Shahyar; "Mr President" by Pourya Heidari; "Dast Bezan" by Mazyar Fallahi; "Dobare Iran" by Mohsen Sharifian; "Dobare Iran" by Amin Rostami; "In Sarzamin" by Mohammadreza Hedayati
- Chant: With Rouhani until 2021 با روحانی تا ۱۴۰۰; We don't go back به عقب برنمی گردیم; Viva Rouhani, Long live Mousavi and Khatami روحانی زنده باد؛ موسوی و خاتمی پاینده باد

Website
- Rouhani.ir; Rouhani96.ir; Dobareiran.com; Sahar.news; Setadrouhani.ir; Rouhani1400.com dolat12.dobareiran.com

Hassan Rouhani, president of Iran from 2013 to 2021, launched his reelection campaign for the presidential office in February 2017. The election itself and related events received international media attention with many issues being raised. Rouhani achieved a decisive victory after the May 2017 vote, with Interior Minister Abdolreza Rahmani Fazli announcing that out of 41.3 million total votes cast Rouhani got 23.6 million. Ebrahim Raisi, Rouhani's closest rival, had picked up 15.8 million votes in contrast.

== Early stages ==
The incumbent President Hassan Rouhani was considered a potential candidate in 2015. On 25 October 2016, Iranian interior minister Abdolreza Rahmani Fazli said that President Hassan Rouhani is “sure to run for a second term”. On 13 January 2017, Mahmoud Vaezi said Moderation and Development Party will back Rouhani in the election. Rouhani himself never announced bid for re-election.

== Branding and record ==
In the summer of 2013 Rouhani was up against serious problems in almost every key sector of the Iranian economy. The economic picture is incomparably better today than it was three years ago. Inflation has declined from 40 to 10%, and the rial’s exchange rate has stabilized at its level from the year President Rouhani was elected. Rouhani has restored a sense of security by preventing hyperinflation and shortages. Peace with world major powers on the basis of Joint Comprehensive Plan of Action at the time he was done. Removing the nuclear sanctions was among Rouhani campaign promises in 2013 and according to his administration, all nuclear-related sanctions, except for certain restrictions in banking, have been lifted following the nuclear deal between Tehran and world powers. The administration Rouhani also succeeded in increasing Iran’s revenues via boosting oil and gas outputs and growing gas condensate exports. Iran oil exports have doubled since the deal took effect and major problems in the way of securing insurance for cargoes carrying oil from Iran have been resolved. Iran there has been an uptick in Asian and European trade with Iran, mainly due to the expansion of Iranian oil exports, which now stand at 2.5 million bpd. Foreigners have shown interest in making investments in the country and sharing their technologic know-how in various industrial fields. Consequently, the Rouhani administration succeeded in signing various agreements to attract foreign investments for implementing infrastructure projects to revamp road, rail, and air transport systems. He extension government campaign by name "Again Iran" and We cannot go back. Rouhani campaign symbol is "Election ink" along with "V sign". Is conversation Rouhani government "Freedom, security, peace and progress".

== Meeting ==
Hassan Rouhani on the big meeting at Azadi Sport Complex said the Iranian nation will decide between the path of "calm or tension" in the next presidential election, which he called "decisive". Addressing a stadium packed with tens of thousands of supporters, Rouhani, who seeks another four-year term in office in the May 19 vote, said the nation on Election day should show the world that it is "determined for the future of Iran, not to sell it out. Rouhani said 12th government to promote justice, reforms Iran spared no efforts to transform the image of extremism and violence to image of hope and justice and reformist way.

== Positions ==
=== Economics ===
Rouhani said "If we want a better economy, we should not let groups with security and political backing to get involved in the economy," Rouhani said during the debate, in an unmistakable swipe at the Islamic Revolutionary Guard Corps, an elite military force with a vast business empire, which has backed his main hardline opponent Ebrahim Raisi. Rouhani said at telecast “Some believe that unemployment can be tackled simply by distributing money or claiming to create plenty of jobs, while what is actually required to raise employment is making people look hopefully at future and feel calm and safe”.

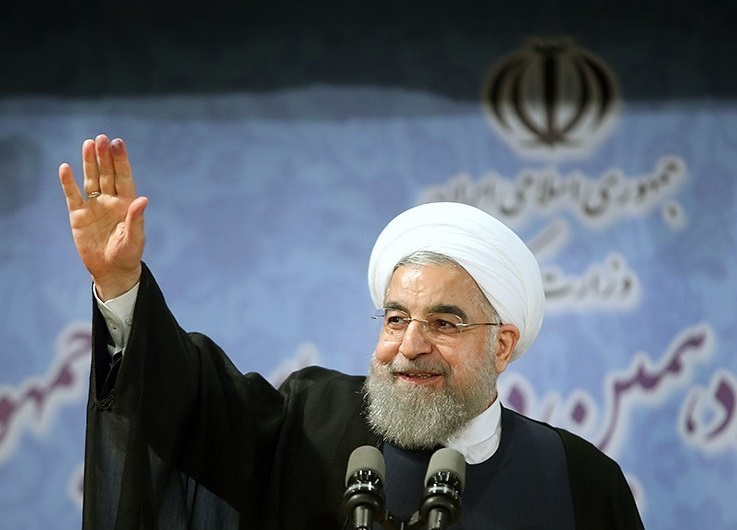
Speech after registering presidential

=== Foreign policy ===
Rouhani said at Isfahan and Mazandaran "Dear people of Iran, vote for freedom. I am ready to get the remaining sanctions lifted if elected. Rouhani said, "Lifting the remaining sanctions would be difficult, as [Ali] Khamenei, who has the last say on all state matters, has flatly rejected normalization of ties with the United States."

=== Social rights ===
Rouhani said in Shiroudi hall meeting, “We won’t accept gender discrimination, we won’t accept gender oppression we want social and political freedom,” he said amid occasional eruptions of chants in support of opposition leaders under house arrest, Mir Hossein Mousavi and Mehdi Karroubi and Mohammad Khatami dear for people. Rouhani is considered a moderate pro-dialogue President. He encourages personal freedom and free access to information. Rouhani advocates the free functioning of social networks. Rouhani to say Ebrahim Raisi, "I am surprised. Those of you who talk about freedom of speech these days".

=== Young generation ===
Rouhani against rivals said “We are here to tell pro-violence extremists that your era has come to an end”, “You hardliners cannot stand against our youth’s choice of freedom and progress.”

== Provincial visits ==
Province	Date	Ref
Qazvin	23 April	
Kerman	29 April	
Yazd	29 April	
Hormozgan	30 April	
Golestan	6 May	
West Azerbaijan	7 May	
Hamedan	7 May	
Kermanshah	8 May	
Lorestan	14 May	
Isfahan	14 May	
East Azerbaijan	14 May	
Mazandaran	15 May	
Zanjan	16 May	
Khuzestan	16 May	
Ardabil	17 May	
Razavi Khorasan	17 May	

== Media coverage ==
Rouhani's campaign publishes a newspaper named National Aspiration. His TV documentary was censored by IRIB.

IRIB programmes
Program title (Channel)	Time	File
Debate (IRIB1)	28 April 2017, 16:00–19:00	
With camera (IRIB1)	29 April 2017, 22:00–22:45	
Recorded conversation (IRINN)	1 May 2017, 21:30–22:00	
Reply Iranian abroad (JJ1)	2 May 2017, 00:30–01:30 (originally 1 May)	
Special conversation (IRIB2)	3 May 2017, 22:45–23:30	
Debate (IRIB1)	5 May 2017, 16:00–19:00	
Documentary (IRIB1)	6 May 2017,18:30–19:00	
Documentary (IRIB1)	9 May 2017,22:00–22:30	
Special conversation (IRIB2)	11 May 2017, 22:45–23:30	
Debate (IRIB1)	12 May 2017, 16:00–19:00	
Reply Iranian abroad (JJ1)	13 May 2017, 00:30–01:30	
Reply Experts (IRIB4)	14 May 2017, 18:00–19:00	Cancelled
Recorded conversation (IRINN)	15 May 2017, 21:30–22:00	
Reply Youths (IRIB3)	17 May 2017, 19:10–18:10	Cancelled

== Endorsements ==
=== Political umbrella organizations ===
- Reformists' Supreme Council for Policymaking
  - Council for Coordinating the Reforms Front
- Reformists Front
- Front of Prudence and Development
Register

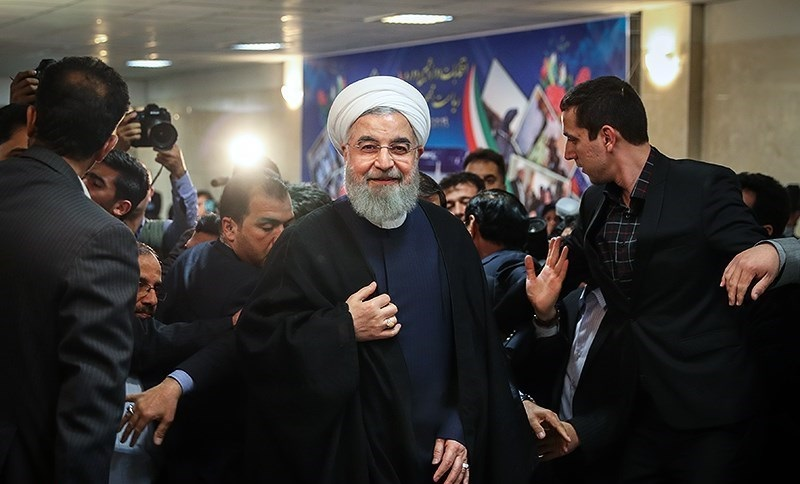
Rouhani submitting his candidacy at the Ministry of Interior

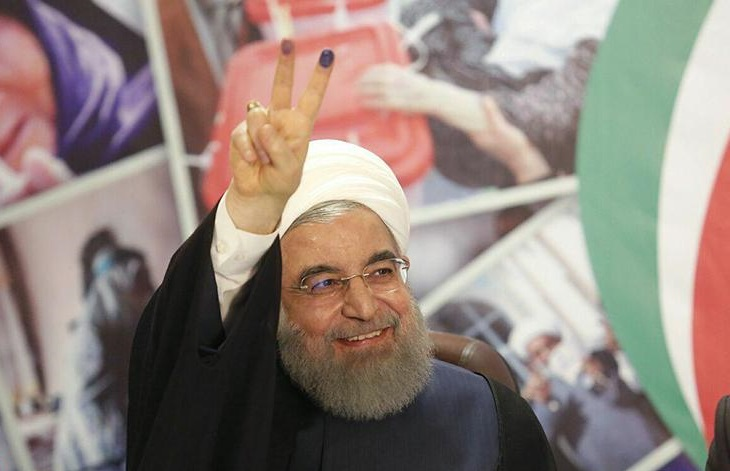
Rouhani showing V sign (Election ink) during time of registration as the symbol of his second bid

=== Parties ===
- Moderation and Development Party
- Union of Islamic Iran People Party
- Democracy Party
- Will of the Iranian Nation Party
- Islamic Labour Party
- NEDA Party
- Association of Combatant Clerics
- Assembly of Qom Seminary Scholars and Researchers
- National Trust Party

Illegal parties

- Freedom Movement of Iran
- Kurdish United Front
- Iranian Call and Reform Organization
- Green Path of Hope
- National Front
- Council of Nationalist-Religious Activists of Iran

=== Trade unions/Profession-designated parties ===
- Workers' House
- Supreme Association of Retired Workers and Social Security Pensioners
- Islamic Association of University Instructors

=== Individuals ===
Politicians

- Eshaq Jahangiri, first vice president
- Mohammad Khatami, former president
- Mir-Hossein Mousavi, former prime minister
- Zahra Rahnavard, one of Green Movement leaders
- Ali Akbar Nategh-Nouri, former speaker of the parliament
- Mehdi Karoubi, former speaker of the parliament
- Mostafa Hashemitaba, 2017 presidential candidate
- Mohammad Reza Aref, MP
- Ali Larijani, parliament speaker
- Abdollah Nouri, former interior minister
- Mohammad Hashemi Rafsanjani, former IRIB head
- Mohammad Beheshti Shirazi, former head of Cultural Heritage organization
- Mostafa Moeen, former science minister
- Ali Younesi, former intelligence minister
- Ebrahim Yazdi, former foreign minister
- Parviz Kazemi, former welfare minister
- Soheila Jolodarzadeh, MP
- Masoud Pezeshkian, MP
- Ali Motahari, MP
- Behrouz Nemati, MP
- Parvaneh Mafi, MP
- Mahmoud Sadeghi, MP
- Behrouz Nemati, MP
- Mohammad Reza Khatami, former MP
- Fatemeh Rakeei, former MP
- Mohsen Rahami, former MP
- Hadi Khamenei, former MP
- Azam Taleghani, former MP
- Rasoul Montajabnia, former MP
- Shahrbanoo Amani, former MP
- Faezeh Hashemi, former MP
- Ali Shakouri-Rad, former MP
- Hossein Marashi, former presidential chief of staff
- Gholamhossein Karbaschi, former mayor of Tehran
- Sadegh Kharazi, former ambassador
- Jalal Jalalizadeh, former MP
- Abbas Amir-Entezam, former deputy prime minister
- Abdollah Ramezanzadeh, former government spokesperson
- Effat Marashi, former first lady
- Ahmad Hakimipour, Tehran City Councilor
- Saeed Hajjarian, former Tehran City Councilor
- Mohsen Hashemi Rafsanjani
- Fatemeh Hashemi Rafsanjani
- Hassan Khomeini
- Zahra Eshraghi
- Majid Takht-Ravanchi
- Hamidreza Jalaeipour
- Mehdi Khazali
Meeting

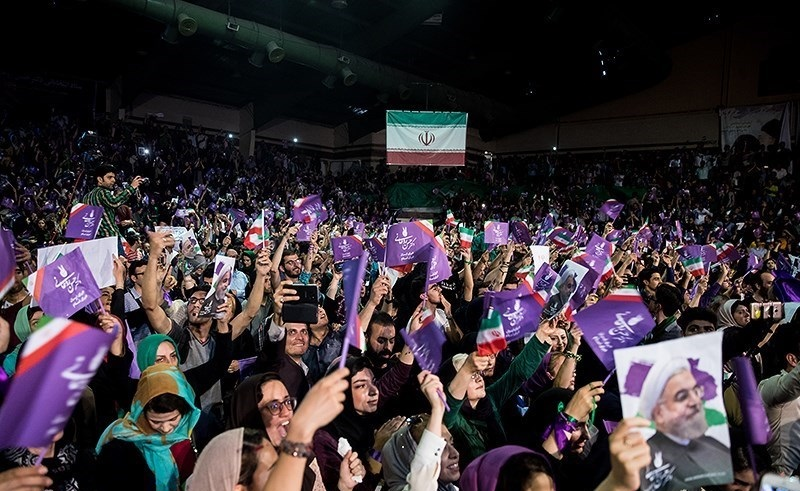
Rouhani campaign's women rally at Shahid Shiroudi Hall Tehran

Philosophers

- Mostafa Malekian
- Mohammad Mojtahed Shabestari
- Abdolkarim Soroush

Clerics

- Molavi Abdul Hamid
- Yousef Sanei
- Ali Mohammad Dastgheib Shirazi

Academics and scholars

- Sadegh Zibakalam
- Abbas Abdi
- Saeed Laylaz
- Emadeddin Baghi
- Mashallah Shamsolvaezin
- Firouz Naderi

Artists, writers and musicians

- Asghar Farhadi
- Taraneh Alidoosti
- Shahab Hosseini
- Reza Attaran
- Kiumars Poorahmad
- Maziar Miri
- Reza Kianian
- Fatemeh Motamed-Arya
- Jamshid Mashayekhi
- Ali Nassirian
- Dariush Arjmand
- Baran Kosari
- Pouran Derakhshandeh
- Farhad Aslani
- Golab Adineh
- Christophe Rezai
- Kianoush Ayari
- Bahareh Rahnama
- Rakhshan Bani Etemad
- Mahtab Keramati
- Abdolhossein Mokhtabad
- Pegah Ahangarani
- Hasan Pourshirazi
- Abdolreza Kahani
- Kamal Tabrizi
- Leili Rashidi
- Reza Naji
- Amir Jafari
- Shabnam Moghaddami
- Houshang Moradi Kermani
- Abdollah Eskandari
- Maziar Miri
- Fereshteh Sadre Orafaee
- Reza Yazdani
- Tannaz Tabatabaei
- Parinaz Izadyar
- Fariborz Arabnia
- Mohammad-Ali Keshavarz
- Mahmoud Dowlatabadi
- Hossein Yari
- Reza Sadeghi
- Sahar Dolatshahi
- Mehdi Fakhimzadeh
- Mohsen Tanabandeh
- Ahmad Mehranfar
- Masoud Jafari Jozani
- Hamid Goudarzi
- Farhad Aslani
- Mehrab Ghasem Khani
- Maryam Amir Jalali
- Niusha Zeighami
- Setareh Eskandari
- Bahareh Kian Afshar
- Ebi
- Mohsen Chavoshi
- Shahrdad Rouhani
- Hafez Nazeri

Athletes

- Ali Karimi
- Ali Daei
- Behdad Salimi
- Omid Norouzi
- Adel Gholami
- Sardar Azmoun
- Karim Bagheri
- Shahram Mahmoudi
- Arvin Moazzami
- Mitra Hejazipour
- Sarasadat Khademalsharieh
- Mehdi Taremi
- Masoud Mostafa-Jokar
- Zahra Nemati
- Alireza Haghighi
- Mojtaba Abedini
- Javad Nekounam
- Mehdi Rahmati
- Mojtaba Moharrami
- Arash Borhani
- Ali Parvin
- Farshad Ahmadzadeh
- Behnam Mahmoudi
- Behnam Barzay
- Hossein Hosseini
- Milad Zakipour
- Roozbeh Cheshmi
- Hamed Lak
- Sajjad Anoushiravani
- Alireza Mansourian
- Farhad Majidi
- Jalal Hosseini
- Ali Akbar Ostad Asadi
- Rahman Rezaei
- Amir Ghalenoei
- Alireza Beiranvand
- Navab Nassirshalal
- Mohammad Panjali
- Ali Ghorbani
- Kaveh Rezaei
- Hossein Shams
- Fereshteh Karimi
- Nima Alamian
- Noshad Alamian
- Mohammad Khalvandi
- Mohammad Sattarpour
- Arash Miresmaeli
- Kimia Alizadeh
- Hanif Omranzadeh
- Sosha Makani
- Rouzbeh Arghavan

== See also ==
- Hassan Rouhani 2013 presidential campaign
