= Rafsanjani (surname) =

Rafsanjani is a surname. Notable people with the surname include:

- Akbar Hashemi Rafsanjani, former president of Iran and an influential Iranian politician
- Faezeh Hashemi Rafsanjani, the third child of Akbar Hashemi Rafsanjani
- Yasser Hashemi Rafsanjani, the fifth child of Akbar Hashemi Rafsanjani
- Mehdi Hashemi Rafsanjani, the fourth child of Akbar Hashemi Rafsanjani
- Mohammad Hashemi Rafsanjani, Iranian politician who has been a member of the Expediency Discernment Council
- Nazanin Rafsanjani, contributor to episodes of This American Life
