= Mohsen Hashemi Rafsanjani =

Iranian politician

- محسن هاشمی رفسنجانی
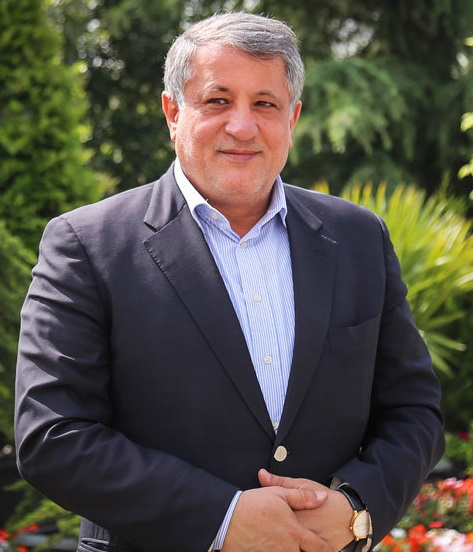
- Rafsanjani in 2019

Chairman of the City Council of Tehran
- In office 23 August 2017 – 4 August 2021
- Deputy: Ebrahim Amini
- Preceded by: Mehdi Chamran
- Succeeded by: Mehdi Chamran

Member of the City Council of Tehran
- In office 23 August 2017 – 4 August 2021
- Majority: 1,756,086

Head of President's Office
- In office 8 June 1996 – 10 August 1997
- President: Akbar Hashemi Rafsanjani
- Preceded by: Hossein Marashi
- Succeeded by: Mohammad-Ali Abtahi

Personal details
- Born: Mohsen Hashemi Bahramani; 24 October 1961 (age 64) Qom, Imperial State of Iran
- Party: Executives of Construction Party
- Spouse: Azam Hashempour
- Children: 3
- Parents: Akbar Hashemi Rafsanjani; Effat Marashi
- Education: Polytechnique Montréal

Mohsen Hashemi Rafsanjani (Persian: محسن هاشمی رفسنجانی, born 24 October 1961) is an Iranian politician, academic and engineer who served as a member and was chairman of the City Council of Tehran from 2017 to 2021. He was the deputy director of Iran's Islamic Azad University from 2013 until 2017 and chairman and CEO of Tehran Metro for 13 years. He was the main reformist member candidate for the fourth period of the Tehran city council in 2013 as Tehran Mayor, but lost to Mohammad Bagher Ghalibaf. In 2017, he was elected as a city councilor and later was elected as chairman of the council.

== Early life ==
Mohsen Hashemi Rafsanjani was born on 24 October 1961 in Qom, Iran. He is the eldest son of Akbar Hashemi Rafsanjani, the fourth president of Iran, and his wife, Effat Marashi. He has two sisters, Fatemeh and Faezeh. He also has two younger brothers, Mehdi and Yasser.

During his childhood, his family was pursued by the SAVAK. At age three, Rafsanjani's father was jailed by the SAVAK. His father moved the family from Qom to Tehran to escape persecution. Rafsanjani studied at Islamic schools in Tehran, such as Alavi and Valyasr.

Rafsanjani's father was jailed for three years before the Iranian Revolution. During that time, Rafsanjani was the head of the house. He became active in cultural school activities and responsibilities in the bazaar Tajrish mosque library, where he read books. During the Iranian Revolution, seventeen-year-old Rafsanjani was active alongside the revolutionaries.

In 1987, Rafsanjani earned a master of applied science (MASc) degree in mechanical engineering from the Polytechnique Montréal.

== Career ==
Rafsanjani served the defense industry until the UN resolution was executed and prisoners of war with Iraq were freed. While a member of the defense industry, he worked on producing Sejjil and Shahab missiles.

During his father's time as president of Iran, Rafsanjani established the Office of Special Investigation of the President to help identify problems and shortcomings. While in this position, Rafsanjani and his colleagues produced nearly 500 effective reports on production, exports, projects, government bureaucracy, and economic problems. Rafsanjani also held the position of the president's Chief of Staff.

=== Tehran Metro ===
Rafsanjani was the CEO of Tehran Metro for thirteen years, from 1998 until March 2011. The Tehran metro was built during his tenure. He was elected as chairman and director of Tehran Metro by Abdollah Nouri, the Interior Minister of Mohammad Khatami. While CEO of Tehran Metro, Rafsanjani separated oversight of the metro from the Interior Ministry and transferred it to Tehran municipality. He used foreign credit to help complete the metro line. When the existing Metro cars were not large enough to carry all people who wanted to use the metro, Rafsanjani used internal and external capital and established a unit that could make new cars.

Rafsanjani resigned from his position as CEO twice. The first time was in 2003, when Mahmoud Ahmadinejad was mayor of Tehran. Ahmadinejad did not accept the resignation, and Rafsanjani later reclaimed his post. In March 2011 he resigned again. This time, the mayor of Tehran (Mohammad Bagher Ghalibaf) accepted his resignation but asked that Rafsanjani continues as the mayor's senior adviser as well as a member of the city board.

== Mayoral candidacy ==
After he resigned from Tehran Metro, Rafsanjani joined the Tehran city council. At the start of the fourth period of the Tehran city council, Rafsanjani was one of the most serious reformist options. As a moderate member of the city council, he stood a good chance to become mayor of Tehran; his close competition was with Mohammad Bagher Ghalibaf, the acting mayor of Tehran at the time.

After the first election in August, Rafsanjani and Ghalibaf had 15 votes each and one vote was white. On the second round of voting, Ghalibaf received 16 votes, while Rafsanjani received 14, with the last vote being white.

== Appointment as Azad University VP ==
In October 2013, by decree of Hamid Mirzadeh, the head of the Islamic Azad University of Iran, Rafsanjani was appointed as the construction assistant director of the Islamic Azad University.

== Other pursuits ==
During the presidency of Hassan Rouhani, Rafsanjani was appointed as a member of the board of directors of the Special Company for Rail Transportation of Iran.

Rafsanjani manages a publishing institute called Nashre Maaref Enghelab, which publishes his and his family's writings.

Rafsanjani is the Union Chairman of Urban Railroad Transportation of Iran. He is the chairman of Iran's Board of Transportation engineering and serves as a member of the Welfare Foundation on behalf of his father.

Rafsanjani is the vice president of the International Union of Public Transport of the Middle East and North Africa. In the past years, he has held various positions, such as chief of staff of the State Expediency Council, head of the president's Special Investigation Office, and board member of the defense industry.

== Electoral history ==
Year	Election	Votes	%	Rank	Notes
2017	City Council of Tehran	1,756,086		1st	Won
2021	President	—N/a			Disqualified

Civic offices
Preceded by Ali Ebrahimi Asl	CEO of Tehran Metro; 1999–2011	Succeeded by Habil Darvish
Preceded by Mehdi Chamran	Chairman of City Council of Tehran; 2017–2021	Succeeded by Mehdi Chamran
Party political offices
Preceded by Eshaq Jahangiri	Head of Executives of Construction Party's Central Council; 25 April 2017–present	Incumbent
Honorary titles
Preceded by Mehdi Chamran	Most-voted Councilor of Tehran; 2017	Succeeded by Mehdi Chamran
