= Mohammad Mirmohammadi =

Iranian politician (1948–2020)

Seyyed Mohammad Mirmohammadi
- محمد میرمحمدی
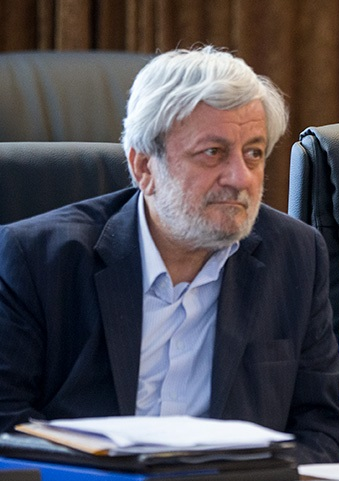
- Mirmohammadi in 2018

Member of the Expediency Discernment Council
- In office 14 August 2017 – 2 March 2020
- Appointed by: Ali Khamenei
- Chairman: Mahmoud Hashemi Shahroudi Sadeq Larijani

Member of the Islamic Consultative Assembly 6th and 7th terms
- In office 2 June 2000 – 2 June 2008 Serving with Mohammad Reza Esmaeili Moghadamm
- Preceded by: Mohammad-Reza Ashtiani Araghi
- Succeeded by: Ali Larijani
- Constituency: Qom
- Majority: 151,491 (47.10%)

Vice President of Iran Secretary General of the Administrative and Recruitment Affairs Organization
- In office 1 February 1994 – 3 September 1998
- President: Akbar Hashemi Rafsanjani
- Preceded by: Mansour Razavi
- Succeeded by: Mohammad Baqirian

Head of President's Office
- In office October 1981 – 16 February 1994
- President: Ali Khamenei Akbar Hashemi Rafsanjani
- Preceded by: Mohammad-Hossein Rafiee
- Succeeded by: Hossein Marashi

Personal details
- Born: Seyyed Mohammad Mirmohammadi; 1948 Qom, Imperial State of Iran
- Died: 2 March 2020 (aged 71–72) Tehran, Iran
- Cause of death: COVID-19
- Party: Islamic Civilization Party
- Other political affiliations: Islamic Republican Party
- Relatives: Mousa Shubairi Zanjani (uncle)

Mohammad Mirmohammadi (Persian: محمد میرمحمدی; 1948 – 2 March 2020) was an Iranian conservative and principlist politician who served as the senior adviser to Iran's Supreme Leader Ayatollah Ali Khamenei, and a member of Expediency Discernment Council. He was the member of the 6th and 7th Iranian parliaments for Qom. Mohammad was a member of the central council of the Islamic Republic Party, presidential chief of staff during the presidencies of Ayatollah Ali Khamenei and Akbar Hashemi Rafsanjani, and secretary general of the Islamic Civilization Party.

== Biography ==
Mirmohammadi was born in Qom, Iran, in 1948. Mousa Shubairi Zanjani, a senior cleric, was his uncle.

Mirmohammadi was appointed a member of the Expediency Discernment Council in August 2017.

Mirmohammadi died from coronavirus disease 2019 (COVID-19) on 2 March 2020, aged 71. At the time, he was the highest-ranking official within Iran's leadership to die of the virus. His mother had also died of COVID-19.
