= Rouhani presidential campaign =

Rouhani presidential campaign may refer to:

- Hassan Rouhani 2013 presidential campaign
- Hassan Rouhani 2017 presidential campaign
