= Effat Marashi =

Widow of Hashemi Rafsanjani (born 1935)

- عفت مرعشی
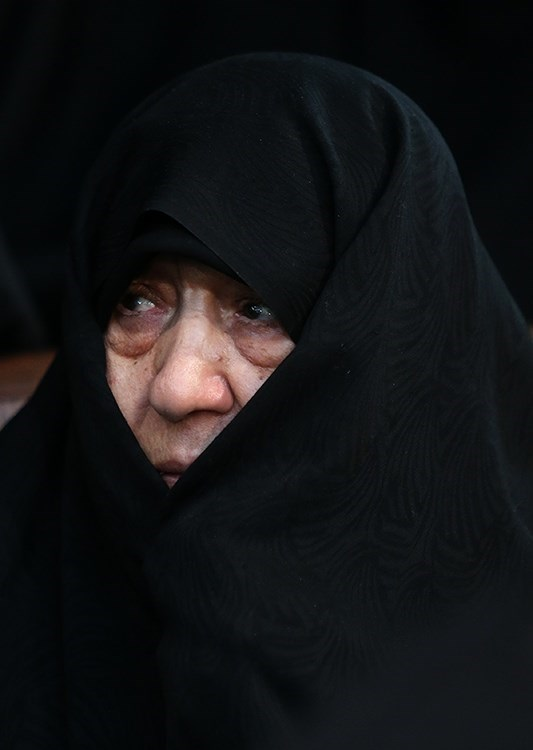
- Marashi at the funeral of her husband in 2017

Spouse of the President of Iran
- In role 16 August 1989 – 3 August 1997
- President: Akbar Hashemi Rafsanjani
- Preceded by: Mansoureh Khojasteh Bagherzadeh
- Succeeded by: Zohreh Sadeghi

Personal details
- Born: 1935 (age 90–91) Kerman, Imperial State of Iran
- Spouse: Akbar Hashemi Rafsanjani (m. 1958; died 2017)
- Children: Fatemeh; Mohsen; Faezeh; Mehdi; Yasser
- Relatives: Hossein Marashi (cousin)

Effat Marashi (Persian: عفت مرعشی; born 1935) is the widow of Iranian politician and former president Akbar Hashemi Rafsanjani. On 25 May 1979, Marashi prevented an assassination attempt on her husband when two members of the Forqan Group tried to kill him. During the 2009 presidential election in Iran, while casting her vote at the Jamaran Hussainiya, statements of hers were published in the media.

== Personal life ==
Effat Marashi comes from a religious family, part of the extended Marashi family, and is a descendant of Mohammed Kazem Yazdi, the author of the book Urwat al-Wuthqa, which holds a respected position in all seminaries. Maryam Tabataba'i Yazdi, the daughter of Ahmad Tabataba'i Yazdi and granddaughter of Mohammad Kazem Tabataba'i Yazdi, had four sons and five daughters from her marriage. Effat Marashi is also from this family, and her relation to Mohammad Kazem Tabataba'i Yazdi is through two lines.

Marashi married Akbar Hashemi Rafsanjani in 1958. The couple had 5 children: Fatemeh, Mohsen, Faezeh, Mehdi, and Yasser.

Marashi was hospitalized at Bahman Hospital in Tehran on 8 June 2016 due to a severe stomach ulcer.

== Activities ==
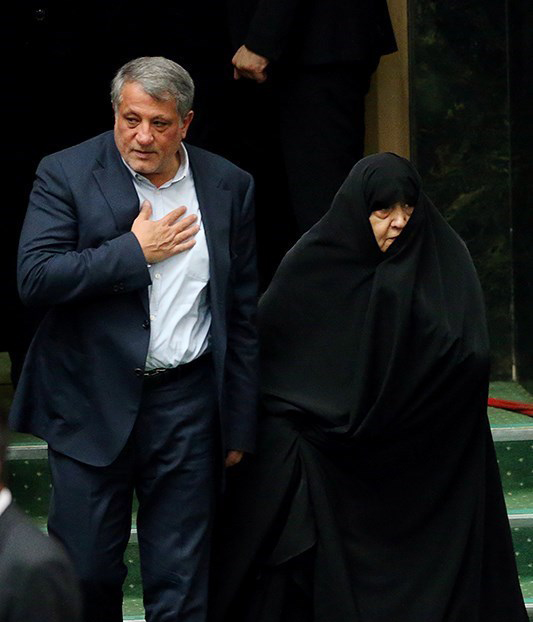
With her son Mohsen at the second inauguration of Hassan Rouhani

In 1979, she prevented the assassination attempt on her husband. During the first decade following the 1979 revolution, she played an active role in family and women-related discussions at the top levels of government, and some of these discussions are reflected in Rafsanjani's memoirs. Her defense of her daughter Faezeh Hashemi and her newspaper Zan was also noted. However, she never openly entered the political arena.

She also had an active role in foreign policy. Although Rafsanjani's account of relations with Saudi Arabia differs from hers, according to Effat Marashi, she initiated Iran's relationship with Saudi Arabia after the 1987 massacre of Iranian pilgrims in Mecca: "After the incident in which Iranian pilgrims were killed in 1987, I traveled alone to Saudi Arabia. During this trip, the wife of [the future] King Abdullah hosted a gathering and invited a number of people. They asked me to accept the invitation, and I did. Once I accepted, relations were established."

During the 2009 presidential election in Iran, Marashi said: "If they cheat, people should protest on the streets!"

Honorary titles
Preceded by Mansoureh Khojasteh Bagherzadeh as wife of Ali Khamenei	Spouse of the President of Iran; 1989–1997	Succeeded by Zohreh Sadeghi as wife of Mohammad Khatami
