= Nikan =

Nikan may refer to:

- Nikan High School, near Tehran, Iran
- Nikan, a Manchu name for China
- Nikan Wailan (died 1587), Jurchen leader affiliated with the Ming dynasty
