= Hossein Marashi =

Iranian politician

Seyyed Hossein Marashi
- حسین مرعشی
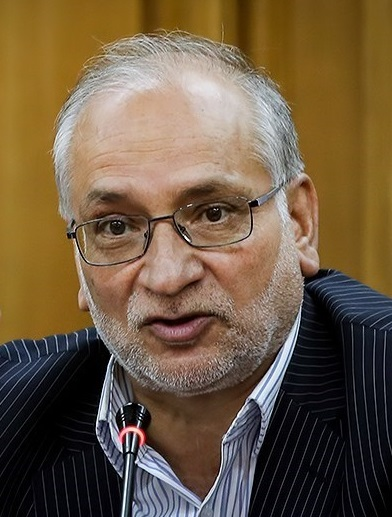
- Marashi in 2017

Vice President of Iran Head of Cultural Heritage and Tourism Organization
- In office 4 May 2004 – 18 August 2005
- President: Mohammad Khatami
- Preceded by: Mohammad Beheshti
- Succeeded by: Esfandiar Rahim Mashaei

Member of Parliament
- In office 28 May 1996 – 4 May 2004
- Constituency: Kerman
- Majority: 141,781 (68.9%; 5th term)

Head of President's Office
- In office 16 February 1994 – 28 May 1996
- President: Akbar Hashemi Rafsanjani
- Preceded by: Mohammad Mirmohammadi
- Succeeded by: Mohsen Hashemi Rafsanjani

Governor of Kerman province
- In office 3 November 1985 – July 1994
- President: Ali Khamenei; Akbar Hashemi Rafsanjani
- Prime Minister: Mir-Hossein Mousavi
- Preceded by: Hamid Mirzadeh
- Succeeded by: Morteza Bank

Personal details
- Born: 17 November 1958 (age 67) Rafsanjan, Iran
- Party: Executives of Construction
- Relatives: Effat Marashi (cousin)

Hossein Marashi (Persian: حسین مرعشی; born 17 November 1958) is an Iranian politician. He served as the Iranian Vice President for Cultural Heritage and Tourism from 2003 to 2005. Prior to that, Marashi represented Kerman in the Iranian parliament. He strongly backed opposition candidate Mousavi in the 2009 Iranian election. Marashi is also reportedly a close ally of Akbar Hashemi Rafsanjani, another former president. He has been secretary general of the Executives of Construction Party. He has been named the head of vice-president Eshaq Jahangiri's campaign.

He was the head of the province of Kerman for nearly nine years. He founded a Kerman-based charity by the name of Mol-Al-Movahedin Charity (or Non-Profit) Institute, which owns Mahan Air, an Iranian private airline. In 2011, the charity was involved in a scandal when it was accused of buying airplanes on behalf of Mahan Air. The airline had been facing sanctions by the United States Department of the Treasury for allegedly transporting weapons and advisors to troubled areas such as Syria and Yemen. The claim that firm had any connection with these political actives was denied by members of its board, and Marashi himself.

As the head of the Cultural Heritage Organization of Iran, Marashi increased the budget of the organization. However, some of Marashi's opponents believe that he was responsible for the disappearance of invaluable historical pieces, and the destruction of historical buildings. These opponents claim that despite public pressure, he never took any action to stop the destruction of historical artifacts. Marashi supported the construction of the controversial Sivand Dam in the territory of Pasargadae. The dam was constructed in proximity to the ancient city, and experts believe that if the dam burst, it could destroy several UNESCO World Heritage Sites.

On March 19, 2010, it was announced that Marashi had been jailed in Iran, when a court of appeals upheld his one-year prison term. He was released from prison earlier than that, on January 25, 2011.

Marashi is a cousin of former president Rafsanjani's wife, Effat Marashi.

Political offices
| Preceded by Hamid Mirzadeh | Governor-general of Kerman province 1985–1994 | Succeeded by Morteza Bank |
| Preceded by Mohammad Mirmohammadi | Head of President's Office; 1994–1996 | Succeeded by Mohsen Hashemi Rafsanjani |
| New title organization established | Vice President of Iran; Head of Cultural Heritage and Tourism Organization; 2004–2005 | Succeeded by Esfandiar Rahim Mashaei |
Party political offices
| Preceded by Majid Ansari | Deputy Head of Hezbollah Assembly; 1997–2000 | Fraction dissolved |
| New title | Deputy Secretary-General of Executives of Construction Party; 1999–2014 | Succeeded by Saeed Laylaz |
| New title Fraction established | Parliamentary leader of Executives of Construction Party; 2000–2003 | Succeeded by Ali Hashemi Bahramani |
| New title | Spokesperson of Executives of Construction Party; 2006–present | Incumbent |
| New title Coalition established | Deputy Head of Reformists Coalition; 2008 | Coalition dissolved |
| Preceded by Mohammad Hashemi Rafsanjani | Head of Political Bureau of Executives of Construction Party; 2014–2021 | Succeeded by Gholamhossein Karbaschi |
| New title | Campaign manager of Eshaq Jahangiri; 2017 | Vacant |
| Preceded by Gholamhossein Karbaschi | Secretary-General of Executives of Construction Party; 2021–present | Incumbent |
