= Charity Foundation for Special Diseases =

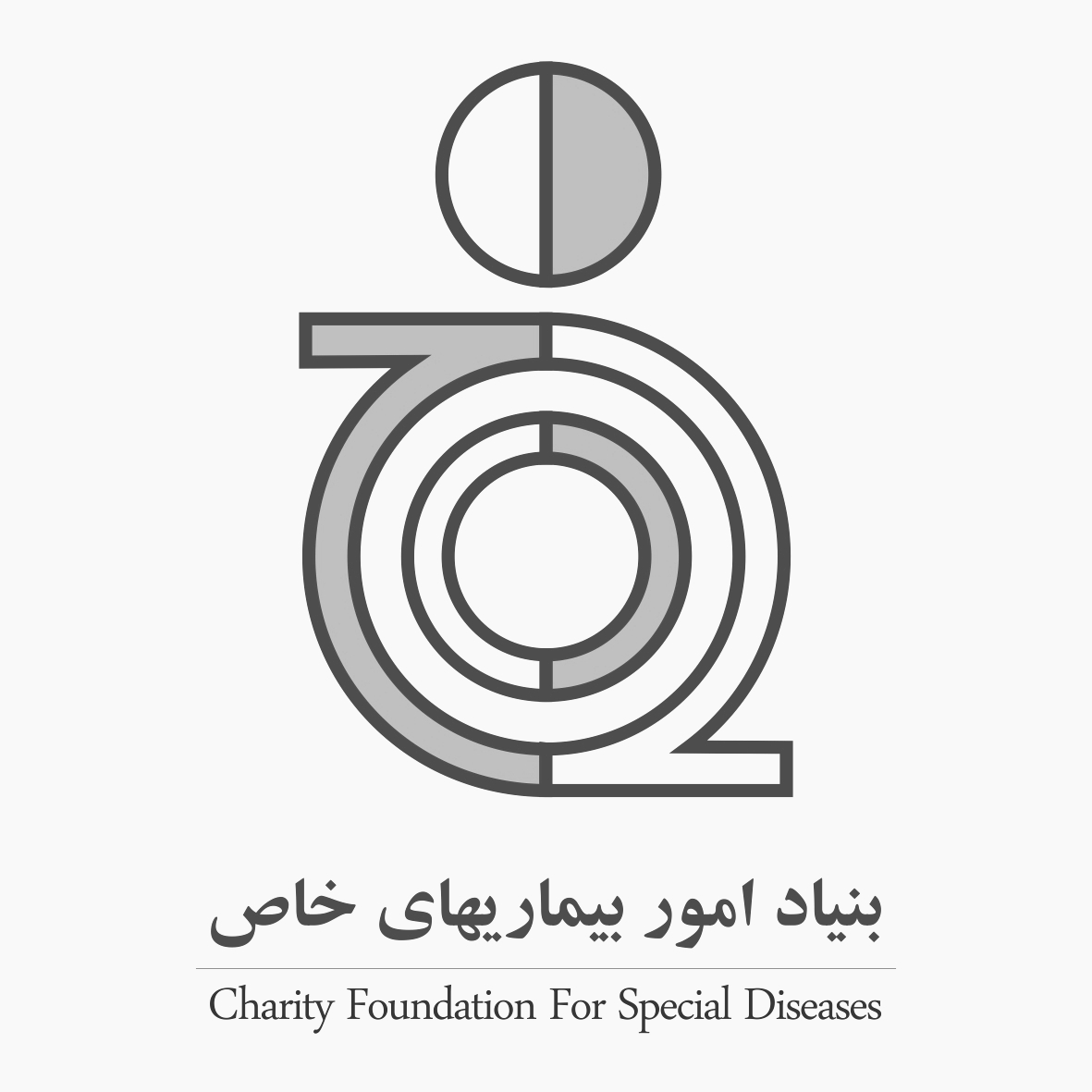

The Charity Foundation for Special Diseases, as a public and NGO entity, started its activities in May 1995 with the support of H.E. Hashemi Rafsanjani and Dr. Fatemeh Rafsanjani and other philanthropists.

== History and establishment ==
The idea behind establishing such an entity came about when President of the foundation met few kidney and thalassemia patients in 1991. Their inappropriate living and medical condition forced her to travel to provinces to collect first hand information and get herself more familiarized with patients. Due to the following prevailing conditions for patients, she had to report the result of fact finding missions to her father and asked for his immediate intervention:

- High epidemic of such disease in the country
- Expensive treatment and lack of remedies
- Patients inability to carry on a constructive work
- Psychological pressure on patients families
- Lack of supportive associations
- Lack of attention in addressing the issue by Ministry of Health

During these years, the Foundation has expanded its coverage from patients with Dialysis, Thalassemia and Hemophilia to other patients with severe illnesses : Cancer, M.S., Kidney transplants, Diebetic and E.B. due to its epidemic and high cost of treatments.

== Established medical centers ==
- Sudeh treatment center (1994)
- Specialized medical center (1999)
- Bam clinic (2005)
- Sharq specialized medical center (2006)
- Diabetic 1 specialized center (2008)
- Rafsanjan center (2013)

== Centers under construction ==
- Najaf medical and rehab. Center
- Karbala therapeutic center
- Borojerd
- Shahrood
- Sharq hospital
- center for research, training and prevention of cancer
- Kavosh rehab. Center
- Gohar’Baran center

== Most important international activities ==
- Member of ECOSOC, UN body
- Member of Thalassemi International Federation (TIF)

== Few important activities ==
- Gift payment of EESAAR for promotion of culture of transplant and in appreciation of kidney donors ( council of minister decree 1995)
- Free of charge treatment of thalassemi-Hemophili-Dialysis patients ( council of M. decree (1996)
- Prevention of thalassemic child birth ( c. of M. decree 1996)
- Establishing personal insurance coverage for cancer, M.S. and diabetic patients (Parliament decree 2006)
