= Morteza Bank =

Iranian politician

- مرتضی بانک
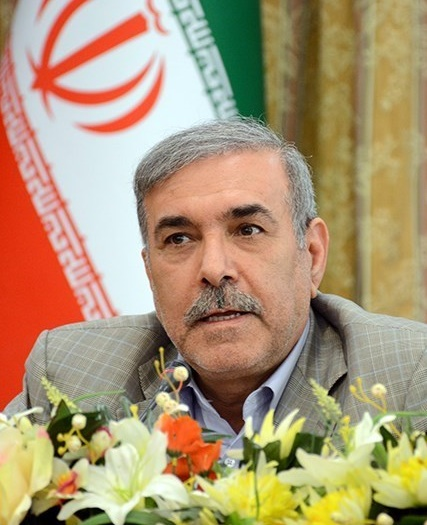

Governor of Kerman Province
- In office 10 July 1994 – September 1997
- President: Akbar Hashemi Rafsanjani
- Preceded by: Hossein Marashi
- Succeeded by: Masoud Mohammadi

Personal details
- Born: 1955 (age 70–71) Isfahan, Imperial State of Iran
- Party: Moderation and Development Party

Morteza Bank (Persian: مرتضی بانک; born 1955) is an Iranian politician who currently serves as deputy to Chief of Staff of the President of Iran. He was formerly administrative and financial deputy to minister of foreign affairs and governor of Kerman Province.

Party political offices
Unknown	Executive Secretary of Moderation and Development Party	Incumbent
