= Collection of daily memos of Hashemi Rafsanjani =

Collection of daily memories of Hashemi Rafsanjani (Persian: مجموعه خاطرات روزانه اکبر هاشمی رفسنجانی) is a collection of diaries written by late Iranian politician Akbar Hashemi Rafsanjani.

Part of his diary is not published due to security reasons.

== Volumes ==
Hashemi’s memoirs begin in March 1981, therefore omitting the first two years after the Islamic Revolution of 1979. So far, 8 books of Hashemi’s memories, covering from March 1981 until 1989 have been published:

- Weathering the Crisis (March 1981-March 1982)
- After the Crisis (March 1982-March 1983)
- Stability and Challenge (March 1983-March 1984)
- Towards Destiny (March 1984-March 1985)
- Defense (1986)
- Defense and Politics (1987)
- End of Defense, beginning of reconstruction (1988)
- Reconstruction (1989)

== See also ==
- The official History of the Islamic republic of Iran
