= Zan (newspaper) =

Iranian women's rights newspaper

- Type: Weekly newspaper
- Founder: Faezeh Hashemi
- Founded: July 1998
- Ceased publication: 6 April 1999
- Language: Persian

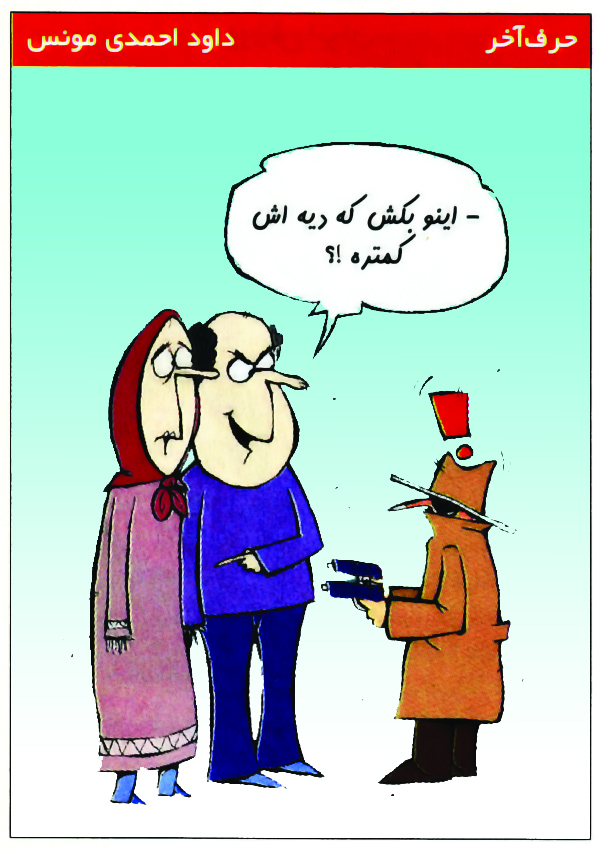
A political cartoon published in the newspaper that was critical of Islamic jurispudence.

Zan (Persian: زن, lit. 'Woman') was an Iranian Persian-language weekly newspaper focused on women's rights, published from 1998 until it was banned in 1999.

== History ==
Zan was founded by Faezeh Hashemi in July 1998, becoming the first-ever women's newspaper in Iran. It brought women into the political debate between modernists and traditionalists. It was quickly harassed by the hard-line judiciary, with reporter Camelia Entekhabifard arrested and held for 76 days. The newspaper was banned on the orders of the Revolutionary Court on 6 April 1999. The reasons cited for the ban included the newspaper's publication of cartoons criticizing Iranian traditionalists, as well as the publication of a Newroz message from Farah Diba, the exiled Empress of Iran.

== Content ==
During its brief existence, Zan broke several important news stories. In the fall of 1998, the newspaper published a leaked list of 179 intellectuals, writers, and political activists who were marked for death by the Iranian government. The list included Nooshabeh Amiri, Ebrahim Nabavi, Mehrangiz Kar, and Camelia Entekhabifard. The story caused a great deal of controversy within Iran.

== See also ==
- List of newspapers in Iran
