= Camelia Entekhabifard =

Iranian journalist and author (born 1973)

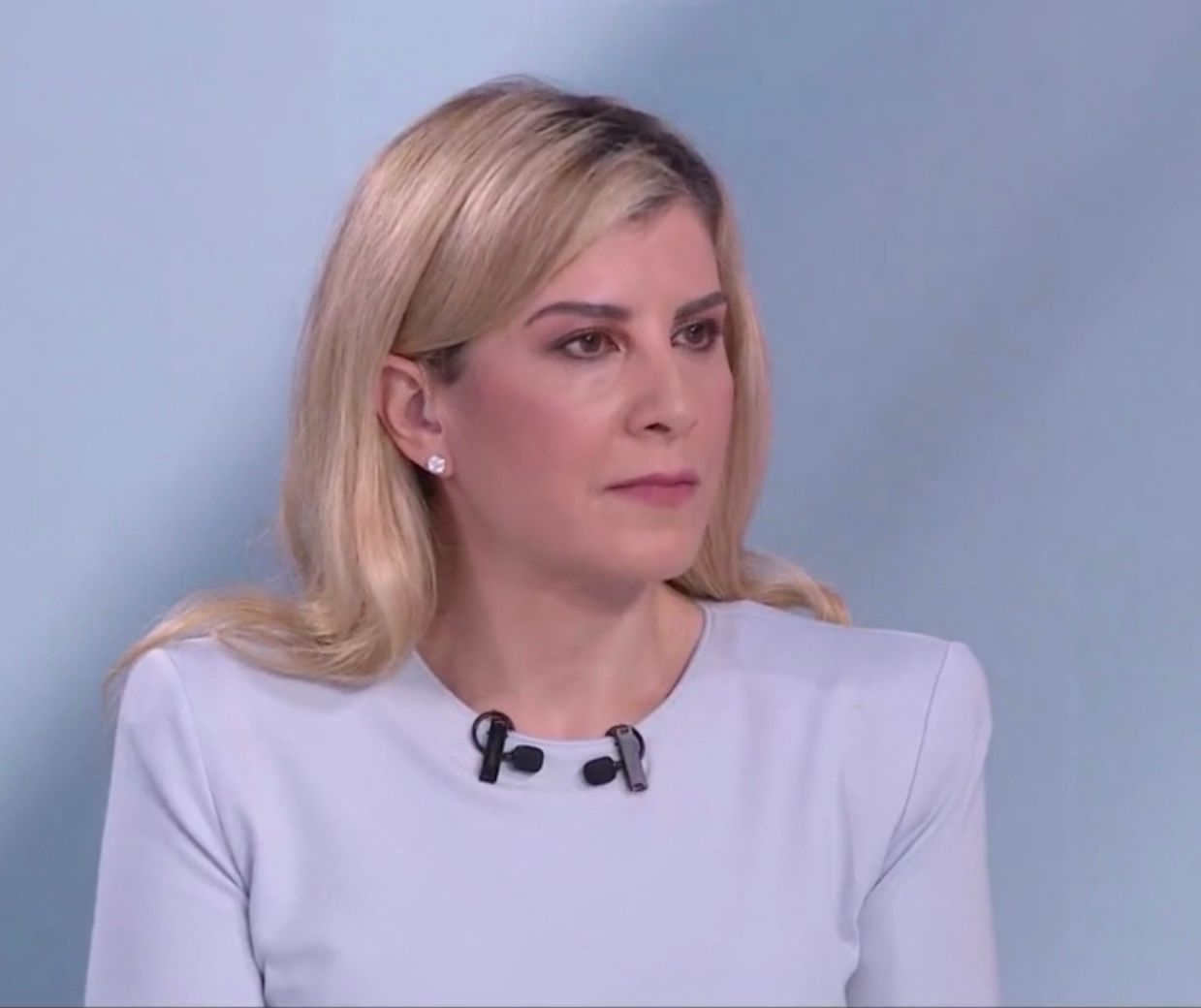
- Entekhabi Fard in 2021
- Born: 1973 (age 52–53); Tehran, Iran
- Education: New York University; Columbia University
- Occupations: Journalist; artist
- Years active: 1993–present

Camelia Entekhabifard (also Camelia E. Fard or Camelia Entekhabi-Fard, Persian: کاملیا انتخابی‌فرد; born 1973) is an Iranian American journalist and the editor-in-chief of the Independent Persian, the first international newspaper published in Persian.

She is an author, columnist and news analyst who writes primarily on Iranian foreign policy as well as Middle Eastern regional issues, including the crisis in Syria, Iraq and Yemen, and the political and security situation in Afghanistan.

Since leaving Iran in 2000, she has reported on Iran and Afghanistan for AP, Reuters, Le Monde Diplomatique, The Independent, Al-Jazeera, New York times, CNN, Newsweek, HuffPost, Al-Arabiya, Al-Hayat, Al-Ahram Weekly, Arab News, Sharq Al-Awsat, Mother Jones, Village Voice among many others.

She is a news commentator and frequently appears on Al-Arabiya, Sky News, Al-Hadath, i24News, Alaraby TV, BBC, CNN and other news channels.

Her book Camelia: Save Yourself by Telling the Truth – A Memoir of Iran (ISBN 978-1-583-22833-3) was published in March 2007 and translated into several languages including English, Arabic, Portuguese, Italian and Turkish.

== See also ==
- List of Iranian women journalists
