= Fatemeh Hashemi Rafsanjani =

Iranian politician

- فاطمه هاشمی رفسنجانی
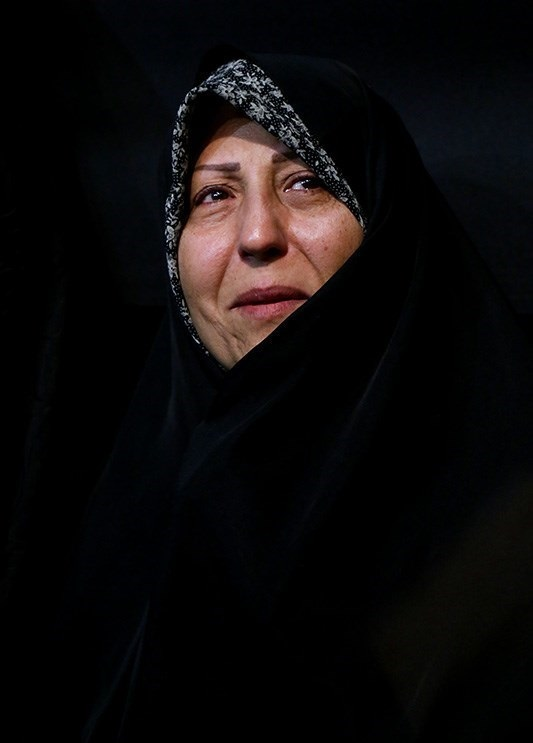
- Born: Fatemeh Hashemi Bahramani c. 1959 or 1960 (age 65–66)
- Title: Head of Charity Foundation for Special Diseases
- Political party: Moderation and Development Party
- Spouse: Saeid Lahouti
- Children: 1
- Parents: Akbar Hashemi Rafsanjani (father); Effat Marashi (mother)

Fatemeh Hashemi Rafsanjani (Persian: فاطمه هاشمی رفسنجانی) is an Iranian politician.

She is a senior member of the Moderation and Development Party and runs the Charity Foundation for Special Diseases.

In 1995, she was head of Iran's delegation to the Organization of Islamic Countries' 1st symposium on women's role in Islamic society, held in Tehran. She is also secretary-general of the Women's Solidarity Association of Iran.
