= Mehdi Hashemi Rafsanjani =

Iranian businessman

- مهدی هاشمی رفسنجانی
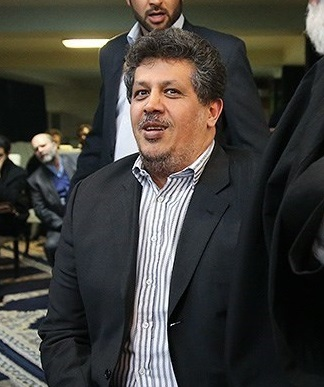
- Hashemi Rafsanjani in 2014
- Born: Mehdi Hashemi Bahramani; 20 September 1969 (age 56); Tehran, Iran
- Occupation: Businessman
- Spouse: Fereshteh Hashemi Rafsanjani
- Children: 2
- Parent(s): Akbar Hashemi Rafsanjani; Effat Marashi

Mehdi Hashemi Rafsanjani (Persian: مهدی هاشمی رفسنجانی; born 20 September 1969) is an Iranian businessman and the fourth child of Akbar Hashemi Rafsanjani, former president of Iran.

== Early life and education ==
Rafsanjani was born on 20 September 1969 in Tehran. He attended elementary, junior and high schools; from Nikan High School, he graduated in 1987. He was accepted at University of Tehran where he majored in telecommunication, obtaining his bachelor's degree in 1992. He earned a master's degree from Sharif University of Technology in the energy engineering field, and worked on a Ph.D. in the energy engineering field at Islamic Azad University.

In October 2010, he began studying for a Ph.D. at Wolfson College, Oxford in oriental studies with a focus on the Iranian constitution.

== Trial ==
In 2007 authorities in France arrested the CEO and other officers of the giant oil company Total S.A. on charges that Total had bribed Iranian officials. From 1997 to 2003, Total paid out €60,000,000 ($80,000,000) for a favorable contract in the PSEEZ off-shore natural gas field. Much of this money was allegedly paid into bank accounts controlled by Mehdi Rafsanjani, then head of the state-owned company Gaz Iran.

Rafsanjani denied this allegation, and threatened the newspapers which reported it with prosecution.

Rafsanjani returned to Iran from exile to answer charges of inciting unrest after a disputed election in 2009, fueling speculation that Rafsanjani's influence in Tehran may once again be growing. In September 2012, he was arrested on a whole raft of charges and released in December 2012.

== Release ==
In January 2023, Rafsanjani was released from prison after over seven years served.
