= Mohammad Beheshti Shirazi =

Iranian politician and artist

Mohammad Beheshti Shirazi محمد بهشتی شیرازی
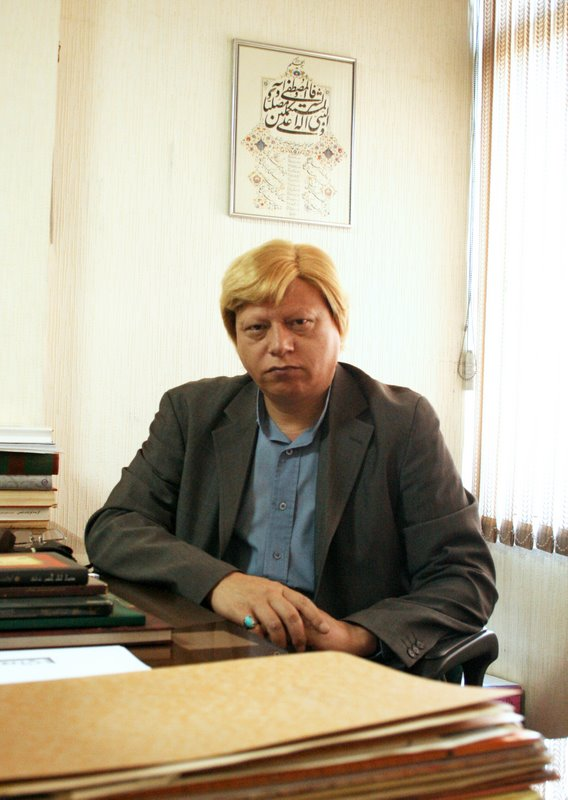

Head of Cultural Heritage and Tourism Organization
- In office 2 September 1997 – 2 June 2003
- President: Mohammad Khatami
- Preceded by: Position established
- Succeeded by: Hossein Marashi

Personal details
- Born: 28 February 1952 (age 74) Shiraz, Iran
- Party: Islamic Iran Participation Front
- Education: National University of Tehran

Mohammad Beheshti Shirazi (Persian: محمد بهشتی شیرازی; born 28 February 1952) is an Iranian politician, artist and cultural figure who is currently Deputy Head of Cultural Heritage and Tourism Organization. He was the first head of Cultural Heritage, Handcrafts and Tourism Organization, being appointed on 2 September 1997 by Mohammad Khatami and held the office until 2 June 2003 when he replaced with Hossein Marashi. He was also head of the Fajr International Film Festival and a member of Iranian Academy of the Arts. He is an assistant professor at Shahid Beheshti University.

He is the younger brother of Alireza Beheshti Shirazi, one of the advisers of Mir-Hossein Mousavi during 2009 presidential election.
