= Yasser Hashemi Rafsanjani =

Iranian politician

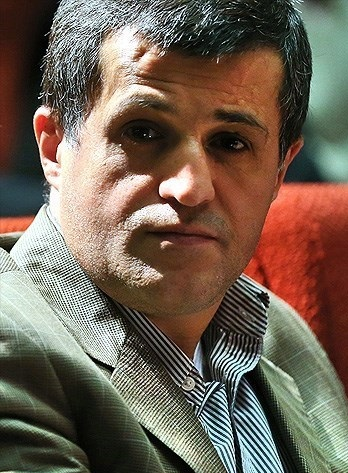
Yasser Hashemi Rafsanjani, c. 2013

Yasser Hashemi Rafsanjani (Persian: یاسر هاشمی رفسنجانی; born 1971) is an Iranian businessman. He is the youngest son of Akbar Hashemi Rafsanjani, the fourth post-revolution president of Iran (in office 1989–1997, died 2017).

== Biography ==
In 1989, Rafsanjani graduated from Nikan High School in Tehran. In the same year, he entered University of Tehran to study civil engineering, but later changed his major. He also studied in Belgium.

As of 2003, Rafsanjani owned a 30-acre (12 ha) horse farm in Lavasan (known as Iran's Beverly Hills) that was estimated to be worth more than US$120 million, based a land value of more than $4 million per acre. At that time he was running a large export-import firm that traded in various goods, including industrial machinery, baby food, and bottled water.
