= Faezeh Hashemi Rafsanjani =

Iranian women's rights activist and politician

- فائزه هاشمی رفسنجانی
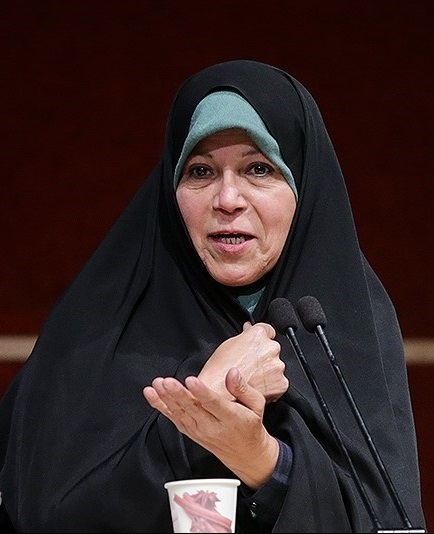

Member of the Parliament of Iran
- In office 8 May 1996 – 3 May 2000
- Constituency: Tehran
- Majority: 852,609 (34.8%)

Personal details
- Born: Faezeh Hashemi Bahramani; 7 January 1963 (age 63) Qom, Pahlavi Iran
- Party: Executives of Construction
- Spouse: Hamid Lahouti
- Children: 2
- Parent(s): Akbar Hashemi Rafsanjani; Effat Marashi
- Education: Islamic Azad University; Birmingham City University
- Occupation: Politician; Journalist; Human rights activist

Faezeh Hashemi Bahramani, better known as Faezeh Hashemi Rafsanjani (Persian: فائزه هاشمی رفسنجانی; born 7 January 1963) is an Iranian women's rights activist, politician and former journalist who served as a member of Iranian parliament from 1996 to 2000. She is also president of Executives of Construction Party women's league and the former editor-in-chief of Zan newspaper.

She is the daughter of the former president, Akbar Hashemi Rafsanjani.

== Early life and education ==
Rafsanjani is the daughter of Ali Akbar Hashemi Rafsanjani and Effat Marashi. She holds a master of laws degree in international human rights from Birmingham City University.

== Career ==
Rafsanjani was a member of the Executives of Construction Party that was established by moderate politicians. In 1993, Rafsanjani helped to organize the Women's Islamic Games; she remained involved with the Games through their most recent edition in 2005. Between 1996 and 2000 she was a parliament representative from Tehran. She founded the women's newspaper Zan in 1998, which was disestablished in April 1999.

=== Views and activism ===
In the 1997 presidential elections, Rafsanjani supported Mohammad Khatami. During the 2009 Iranian election protests, Reuters reported that Rafsanjani addressed a crowd at a banned opposition rally in Tehran on 16 June, and was subsequently prohibited from leaving the country. She was arrested and briefly detained at least twice after participating in an opposition rallies in Tehran on 20 June 2009 (together with four relatives), and again on 20 February 2010 after "making blunt statements and chanting provocative slogans," according to Iranian state media. She was again arrested in February 2011. In March 2011, her son, Hassan, was also arrested. During the 2022 Iran protests, she was once again arrested, for allegedly having "[incited] rioters to street protests" in Tehran.

A couple of videos appeared on the internet showing her being harassed by hardliners. Sometime before 27 February 2011, a video appeared showing Hashemi surrounded by several "hard-liners" threatening her with violence, insulting her, calling her a "whore," and chanting "Death to Rafsanjani".

Faezeh favors women's rights, and has been a staunch advocate of relaxation of strict dress code. Wearing a chador herself, she expressed opposition to the compulsory wearing of the hijab. She has advocated for cycling. She has traveled widely to Europe, Africa, and India to promote dialogue and is interested in ties with all regions. She has written positively about the effective movements of Mahatma Gandhi, Martin Luther King Jr. and Nelson Mandela.

Recently she was introduced as "Faezeh, defendant of women's rights all over Iran" by United States Foreign office on their Instagram page. This brought about heated discussions amongst Iranian activists and Iranian citizens saying that "Faezeh is the daughter of Rafsanjani who is responsible for the death of many in Iran and she does not represent Iranian women." Many asked the Foreign office to delete the post and said "we do not need nor allow you to make leaders for our freedom movement."

== Trials ==
=== 1st trial ===
Faezeh Hashemi Rafsanjani
- Status: Convicted
- Conviction: Propaganda against the system
- Penalty: ½ year in prison
- Capture status: Completed sentence and freed

Details
- Date apprehended: 2012–2013
- Imprisoned at: Evin Prison

On 24 December 2011, she was standing trial on charges of making anti-regime propaganda, her lawyer was quoted as saying after a closed hearing. After the court told her about her accusation of propaganda against the regime, she and her lawyer gave their defence. Hashemi was arrested and released after taking part in a number of protests which erupted after a 2009 election which saw President Mahmoud Ahmadinejad reelected to office despite opposition claims the vote was rigged. She was arrested again for participating in anti-regime demonstrations in February 2011.

Her father, Akbar Hashemi Rafsanjani was facing harsh criticism from conservatives who demand he publicly condemn opposition leaders Mir-Hossein Mousavi and Mehdi Karroubi – he lost his seat on the powerful Assembly of Experts as a result. Rafsanjani later somewhat distanced himself from the opposition leaders and condemned the last anti-government demonstrations staged by their supporters. But his stance did not satisfy the conservatives.

==== Sentencing ====
On 3 January 2012, she was sentenced to six months in prison. She had 20 days to appeal. On 22 September 2012, Hashemi was arrested to serve her sentence. She was taken to Evin prison. She was released in March 2013 upon the completion of the sentence.

=== 2nd trial and sentencing ===
On 17 March 2017, she was again sentenced to jail for six months because of spreading propaganda against the regime, Iranian news media reported.

=== 3rd trial and sentencing ===
On 11 May 2022, she was summoned to prosecution once more over comments she made regarding prophet Muhammad and his wife Khadija, which she claimed were a joke, as well support for sanctions against Iran. Specifically, she claimed that the IRGC should remain on the US FTO list, supporting the continuation of the America sanctions regime. This led to a reaction inside Iran, with 55,000 people signing a petition urging her to be tried. After this, she was officially summoned to court. On 3 July 2022, following court proceedings, she was charged with carrying out propaganda activity against the country and blasphemy.

=== 4th detainment ===
Rafsanjani was arrested again in late September 2022 during the Mahsa Amini protests. Rafsanjani said the protests were in connection with "the issue of the hijab and the [establishment's] Taliban-like view of women's and social issues." In 2023, she was sentenced to five years in jail.

=== 5th trial ===
In a 2025 interview, Faezeh Hashemi alleged that her father, Akbar Hashemi Rafsanjani, was assassinated, not by Russia or Israel, but by the highest echelons of power in the Islamic Republic, because "he sided with the people and spoke out" and "he was in their way- so he had to be removed". In response to the interview, the Iranian Ministry of Justice filed a case against her.

== See also ==
- List of Iranian women activists
