= Nikan High School =

High school in Tehran, Iran

- مدرسهٔ نیکان
- 3 Chenaran St., Shahid Fayyazi St., Fereshteh, Tehran, Iran

Information
- Type: Private
- Established: 1967
- Principal: Khashani Vahid
- Staff: 80 part-time teachers and 50 staff
- Enrollment: 400
- Website: www.nikan.org

Main building

View from principal's office

Nikan High School (Persian: مدرسهٔ نیکان) is a boys-only school located in the north of Tehran, Iran. Nikan is an ancient Persian-Zoroastrian name meaning "all the goodness in the world".

The school is associated with Alavi High School.

== Admissions ==
About 80% of the 8th grade class continues to 12th grade.

== Location ==
The campus is located in the Elahiyeh neighborhood of Tehran.

== See also ==
- Alborz High School
- Razi High School
- Zoroastrians in Iran
