= Akbar Hashemi Rafsanjani =

President of Iran from 1989 to 1997

Ayatollah Akbar Hashemi Rafsanjani
- اکبر هاشمی رفسنجانی
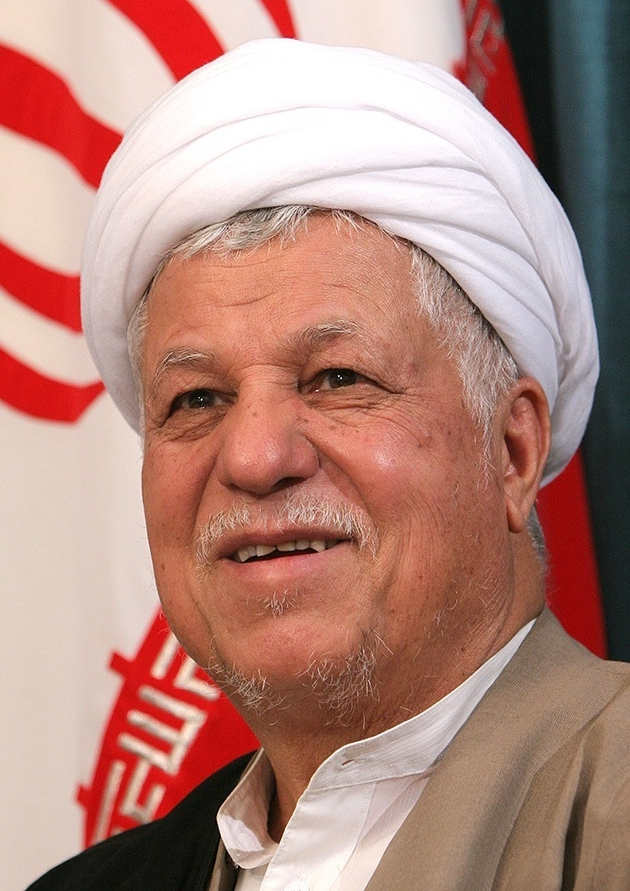

President of Iran
- In office 16 August 1989 – 3 August 1997
- Supreme Leader: Ali Khamenei
- First Vice President: Hassan Habibi
- Preceded by: Ali Khamenei
- Succeeded by: Mohammad Khatami
Other positions held
2nd Chairperson of the Expediency Discernment Council
In office 4 October 1989 – 8 January 2017
Appointed by	Ali Khamenei
Preceded by	Ali Khamenei
Succeeded by	Mahmoud Hashemi Shahroudi
Chairman of the Assembly of Experts
In office 25 July 2007 – 26 July 2007
Supreme Leader	Ali Khamenei
Preceded by	Ali Meshkini
Succeeded by	Mohammad-Reza Mahdavi Kani
18th Speaker of the Parliament of Iran
In office 28 July 1980 – 29 July 1980
First Deputy	See list: Ali-Akbar Parvaresh; Mohammad Mousavi Khoeiniha; Mohammad Yazdi; Mehdi Karroubi
Preceded by	Javad Saeed
Succeeded by	Mehdi Karroubi
Member of the Assembly of Experts
In office 15 August 1983 – 8 January 2017
Constituency	Tehran Province
Majority	2,301,492 (5th term)
Tehran's Friday Prayer Temporary Imam
In office 3 July 1981 – 17 July 2009
Appointed by	Ruhollah Khomeini; Ali Khamenei
Member of the Parliament of Iran
In office 28 May 1980 – 3 August 1989
Constituency	Tehran, Rey, Shemiranat and Eslamshahr
Majority	1,891,264 (81.9%; 2nd term)
Minister of Interior
Acting; 17 November 1979 – 27 February 1980
Appointed by	Islamic Revolution Council
Preceded by	Hashem Sabbaghian
Succeeded by	Mohammad-Reza Mahdavi Kani

De facto Commander-in-Chief of the Islamic Republic of Iran Army or Commander-in-Chief of the Iranian Armed Forces
- In office 2 June 1988 – 20 August 1988
- Preceded by: Office Established
- Succeeded by: Mir-Hossein Mousavi

Personal details
- Born: Ali Akbar Hashemi Bahramani; 25 August 1934 Bahreman, Iran
- Died: 8 January 2017 (aged 82) Tajrish, Iran
- Resting place: Mausoleum of Ruhollah Khomeini
- Party: Executives of Construction Party
- Other political affiliations: Islamic Republican Party (1979–1987); Combatant Clergy Association (1987–2017)
- Spouse: Effat Marashi (m. 1958)
- Children: Fatemeh; Mohsen; Faezeh; Mehdi; Yasser
- Website: Official website (in Persian)

Military service
- Allegiance: Iran
- Branch/service: Iranian Armed Forces
- Years of service: 1988
- Battles/wars: Iran–Iraq War
- Awards: Order of Fath (1st grade)

Ali Akbar Hashemi Bahramani Rafsanjani (Note: Persian: علی اکبر هاشمی بهرمانی رفسنجانی, romanized: Ali Akbar Hâshemi Bahramâni Rafsanjâni) (né Bahramani; 25 August 1934 – 8 January 2017) was an Iranian Shia cleric and politician who was the President of Iran from 1989 to 1997. One of the founding fathers of the Islamic Republic of Iran, Rafsanjani was the head of the Assembly of Experts from 2007 until 2011 when he decided not to nominate himself for the post. He was also the chairman of the Expediency Discernment Council.

During his 40-year tenure, Rafsanjani amassed considerable power serving as the speaker of parliament, Commander-in-Chief during the Iran–Iraq War, president, and chose Ali Khamenei as the supreme leader of Iran.

Rafsanjani became President of Iran after winning the 1989 election. He served another term by winning the election in 1993. In the 2005 election he ran for a third term in office, placing first in the first round of elections but ultimately losing to rival Mahmoud Ahmadinejad in the run-off. He and his family faced political isolation for their support of the opposition in 2009. Rafsanjani entered the race for the 2013 presidential election, but he was disqualified by the Guardian Council. With Hassan Rouhani's election, in which Rafsanjani openly supported him, the Rafsanjani family gradually recovered their political reputation. Rafsanjani died in 2017, following a heart attack, in a hospital in Tehran at the age of 82. Although government officials attributed his death to cardiac arrest, his sudden death prompted speculation that he had been assassinated. His family strongly asserted that he had been murdered. Further investigation revealed that his body was highly radioactive.

Rafsanjani has been described as a pragmatic Islamic conservative. The Economist called him a "veteran kingmaker". He supported a capitalist free market position domestically, favoring privatization of state-owned industries and a moderate position internationally, seeking to avoid conflict with the United States and the West. He was also the founder of, and one of the Board of Trustees of Azad University. In 2003, Forbes estimated his personal wealth to be in excess of US$1 billion.

== Early life and education ==
Ali Akbar Hashemi Bahramani was born on 25 August 1934 in the village of Bahraman near the city of Rafsanjan in Kerman Province, to a wealthy family of pistachio farmers. His family originated from the Mir tribe of Bala Gariva, and descended from a man named Hashem, who migrated to Bahraman and died around 1867. He had seven siblings. His father, Mirza Ali Hashemi Behramani, was a pistachio merchant, one of Kerman's famous businessmen. His mother, Hajie Khanom Mahbibi Hashemi, died at the age of 90 on 21 December 1995. One of his brothers, Mohammad Hashemi, is the former director of IRIB. From childhood onward, Rafsanjani did not see himself as a peasant, according to family members.

He left at the age of 14 to study theology in Qom. There he became acquainted with the ideas of Ayatollah Ruhollah Khomeini, the most senior dissident cleric who later became the founder of the Islamic Republic, on the political role of the clergy. His other teachers were Seyyed Hossein Borujerdi, Mohammad-Reza Golpaygani, Mohammad Kazem Shariatmadari, Abdul-Karim Ha'eri Yazdi, Shahab al-Din Mar'ashi Najafi, Nematollah Salehi Najafabadi, Muhammad Husayn Tabataba'i, and Hussein-Ali Montazeri.

== Political career ==
=== Pre-Revolution struggles ===
When Bahramani was studying at Qom Seminary, he became interested in politics under Ruhollah Khomeini. He was one of the opposers of Mohammad Reza Shah's White Revolution and accompanied Khomeini. During this time, Bahramani adopted Rafsanjani, the name of his hometown, as his new surname and placed it behind his original surname as per clerical custom where a cleric traditionally adds the name of their hometown as their new surname. This opposition eventually led to his arrest and imprisonment. He was arrested seven times from 1960 until 1979 and was in jail for four years and 5 months in total due to his clandestine activities against the Pahlavi regime. Khomeini made him the financial manager of the revolutionary struggle as well as the bridge with other revolutionary groups.

Among the groups that had close ties with Hashemi, was the Islamic Coalition Party, which is known for its responsibility for the assassination of former Prime Minister Hassan Ali Mansur. This communication was another reason for his arrest. In prison, he found the opportunity to become familiar with other groups opposed to the Shah. In the mid-1970s, Rafsanjani travelled to various countries to evaluate the position of anti-Shah resistance groups abroad, including the United States, where his brother Mohammad Hashemi Rafsanjani was studying at the University of California, Berkeley.

Rafsanjani travelled across sixteen states during his two-week stay, where his brother showed him locations such as Hollywood, the Statue of Liberty, and Yosemite National Park. According to Rafsanjani's brother, a bear broke into their car at Yosemite after they ignored a sign warning visitors not to keep food in their car. Rafsanjani had previously been to the West, visiting several European countries with his wife and children. He made a habit of taking notes about these developed countries to study their living conditions, industry, and resources, in a desire to replicate the same prosperity in his home country. Upon his return to Iran, Rafsanjani was arrested by SAVAK and remained in prison until the victory of the Iranian revolution.

=== After the revolution ===
After the victory of Iranian Revolution, Rafsanjani became one of the members of Council of Islamic Revolution. He was one of the council's most powerful members from its establishment. He was also deputy interior minister at that time and later became the acting interior minister.

He was one of the 28 founders of Traditional right-wing Combatant Clergy Association and also one of the members of the central committee of Islamic Republican Party in the first years of the revolution. Years later, it was he who requested IRP's dissolution. His political acumen and Khomeini's full trust helped Rafsanjani as one of the most powerful politicians in Iran at that time. At the time, he was one of Khomeini's closest associates and ruled as his "eyes and ears". According to the Gold, Islamic Revolutionary Guard Corps was established with the help of Rafsanjani.

Rafsanjani served as one of the Tehran's Friday Prayer Imams (for next thirty years), Representative of Khomeini at Defense High Council (after death of Mostafa Chamran) and Second-in-Command of Iran's Joint Chiefs of Staff in the last year of Iran–Iraq War. He forced Khomeini to accept to end the war. Only three months after his appointment as Iran's deputy commander-in-chief, Iran accepted United Nations Security Council Resolution 598 and eight-year war was ended.

== Chairmanship of the Parliament (1980–1989) ==
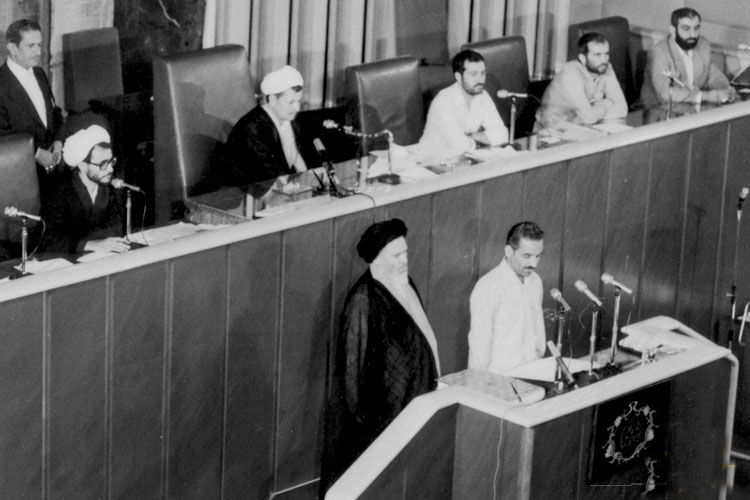
Rafsanjani as parliament chairman in the inauguration of Mohammad-Ali Rajai

Iran's first Election Law was developed with Rafsanjani's partnership. He was nominated as one of the Islamic Republican Party's candidates in the 1980 legislative election in Tehran. He gained 1,151,514 (54%) votes and ranked 15. Rafsanjani was the Speaker of Parliament of Iran for 9 years. He was elected as the speaker in 1980 in the first season of Parliament after the Iranian Revolution. He was also chairman in the second season and first year of the third parliament. After the death of Ruhollah Khomeini, founder of the Islamic Republic and election of then-President Ali Khamenei as new supreme leader, he joined the 1989 presidential race and became the President, leaving Parliament.

He had a determining role in the dismissal of Abulhassan Banisadr as commander-in-chief of Iranian military and then his impeachment in the parliament as Iran's first president in June 1981. In the summer of 1981, he protested to the veto of the parliament's plan by the Guardian Council and informed it to Ruhollah Khomeini. This led to the establishment of Expediency Discernment Council, which later he came to be a chairman of.

In the October 1981 presidential election, when he voted for Ali Khamenei, he described it as a vote of "Imam (Khomeini), clerics and the parliament". During differences between Prime Minister Mir-Hossein Mousavi and Khamenei, Hashemi managed to maintain a compromise between Mousavi's reformists and Khamenei's principlists.

Rafsanjani had a prominent role in the Iran–Contra affair, as some participants in the affair in the US government claimed that Rafsanjani headed a "moderate" faction within Iran's government that they hoped to negotiate with. Exactly what role Rafsanjani himself played in this affair remains unclear.

Following the death of Ruhollah Khomeini in June 1989, Rafsanjani was involved in discussions over the succession. At a meeting of the Assembly of Experts on 4 June, Rafsanjani and Ali Khamenei advocated the establishment of a three-member leadership council, but the assembly instead elected Khamenei as supreme leader by 60 votes out of 74.

== Presidency (1989–1997) ==
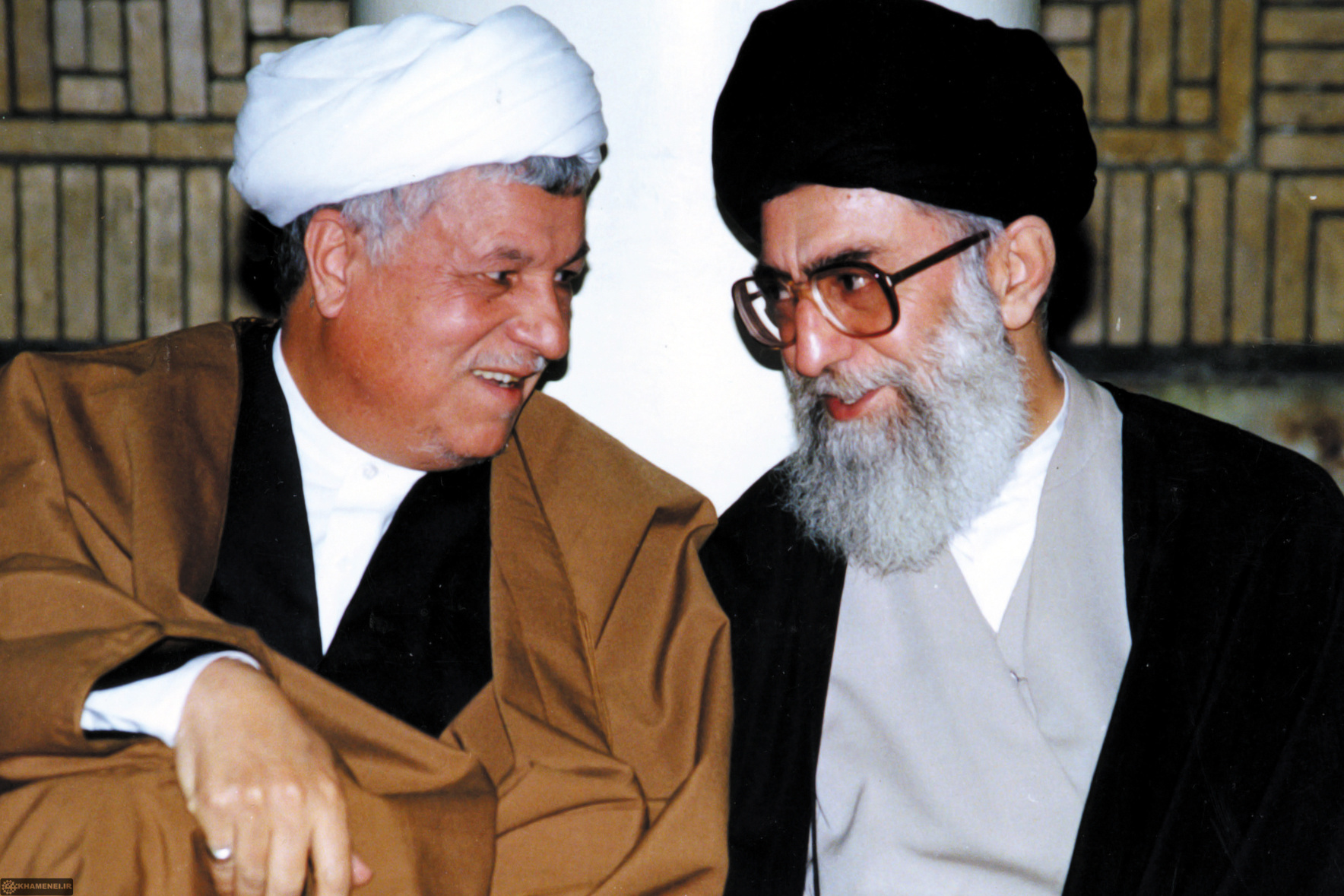
Rafsanjani with newly elected Supreme Leader, Ali Khamenei, 1989

Rafsanjani's presidency reportedly began on 16 August 1989. adopted an "economy-first" policy, supporting a privatization policy against more state-owned economic tendencies in the Islamic Republic. Another source describes his administration as "economically liberal, politically authoritarian, and philosophically traditional" which put him in confrontation with more radical deputies in the majority in the Majles of Iran.

As president, Rafsanjani was credited with spurring Iran's reconstruction following the 1980–88 war with Iraq. His reforms, despite attempting to curb the powers of the ultra-conservatives, failed to do so, and the Iranian Revolutionary Guards received increasing power from Khamenei during his presidency. He was also accused of corruption by both conservatives and reformists, and was known for tough crackdowns on dissent.

=== Domestic policy ===
Rafsanjani advocated a free-market economy. With the state's coffers full, Rafsanjani pursued an economic liberalization policy. Rafsanjani's support for a deal with the United States over Iran's nuclear program and his free-market economic policies contrasted with Mahmoud Ahmadinejad and his allies, who advocate maintaining a hard line against Western intervention in the Middle East while pursuing a policy of economic redistribution to Iran's poor. By espousing World Bank inspired structural adjustment policies, Rafsanjani desired a modern industrial-based economy integrated into the global economy. Rafsanjani was critical of state intervention in the economy.

Rafsanjani urged universities to cooperate with industries. Turning to the quick pace of developments in today's world, he said that with "the world constantly changing, we should adjust ourselves to the conditions of our lifetime and make decisions according to present circumstances". Among the projects he initiated are Islamic Azad University.

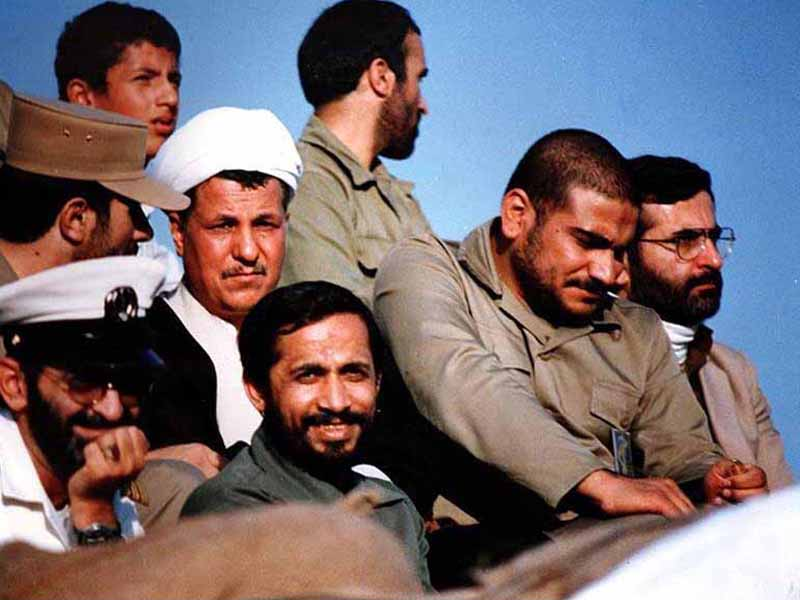
Rafsanjani with some Iranian commanders of Iran–Iraq War

During his presidency, a period in which Rafsanjani is described by western media sources as having been the most powerful figure in Iran, people ordered executed by the judicial system of Iran included political dissidents, drug offenders, Communists, Kurds, followers of the Baháʼí Faith, and even Islamic clerics.

Regarding the Iranian People's Mojahedin Organization of Iran, Rafsanjani said (Ettela'at, 31 October 1981):

God's law prescribes four punishments for them (the Mojahedin). 1-Kill them. 2-Hang them, 3-Cut off their hands and feet 4-Banish them. If we had killed two hundred of them right after the Revolution, their numbers would not have mounted this way. I repeat that according to the Quran, we are determined to destroy all [Mojahedin] who display enmity against Islam.

Rafsanjani also worked with Khamenei to maintain the stability of government after the death of Khomeini.

=== Foreign policy ===
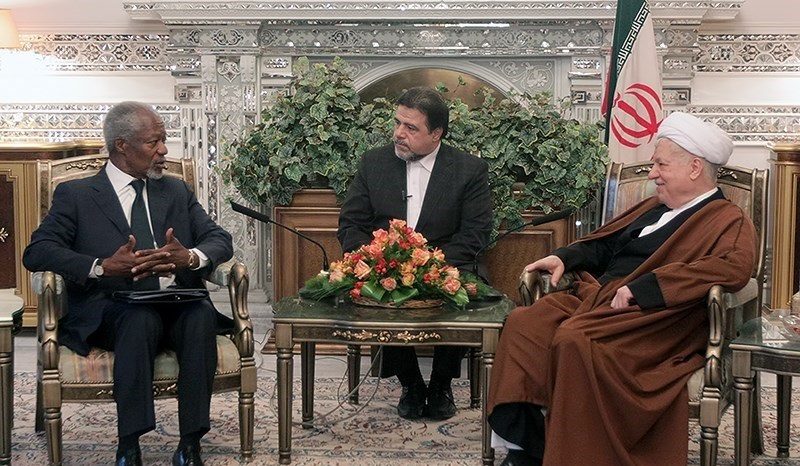
Rafsanjani meeting with former United Nations Secretary General Kofi Annan

Following years of deterioration in foreign relations under Khomeini during the Iran–Iraq War, Rafsanjani sought to rebuild ties with Arab states as well as with countries in Central Asia and the Caucasus, including Azerbaijan, Turkmenistan and Kazakhstan. However, relations with European countries and the United States remained poor, even though Rafsanjani had a track record of handling difficult situations and defusing crises.

On 17 September 1992, four people, including three leading members of the Democratic Party of Iranian Kurdistan, were killed in an attack at the Mykonos restaurant in Berlin. Following a trial lasting more than three years, the Berlin Court of Appeal convicted four men in April 1997 for their roles in the murders. In its judgment, the court concluded that the killings had been ordered by Iran's political leadership and that the country's Special Affairs Committee had been responsible for authorizing the operation. Rafsanjani, then president, was a member of the committee, alongside Supreme Leader Ali Khamenei, Intelligence Minister Ali Fallahian and Foreign Minister Ali Akbar Velayati. As a result, Germany withdrew its ambassador from Tehran, and fourteen European Union countries suspended diplomatic relations with Iran.

Rafsanjani condemned both the United States and Ba'athist Iraq during the Persian Gulf War in 1991. After the war he strove to renew close ties with the West, although he refused to lift Khomeini's fatwa against the British author Salman Rushdie for his Satanic Verses.

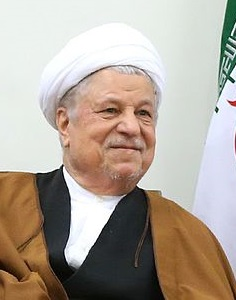
Rafsanjani at the House of Leadership

Rafsanjani said that Iran is ready to assist Iraq, "expecting nothing in return", he also said that "peace and stability" is a function of the "evacuation of the occupiers."

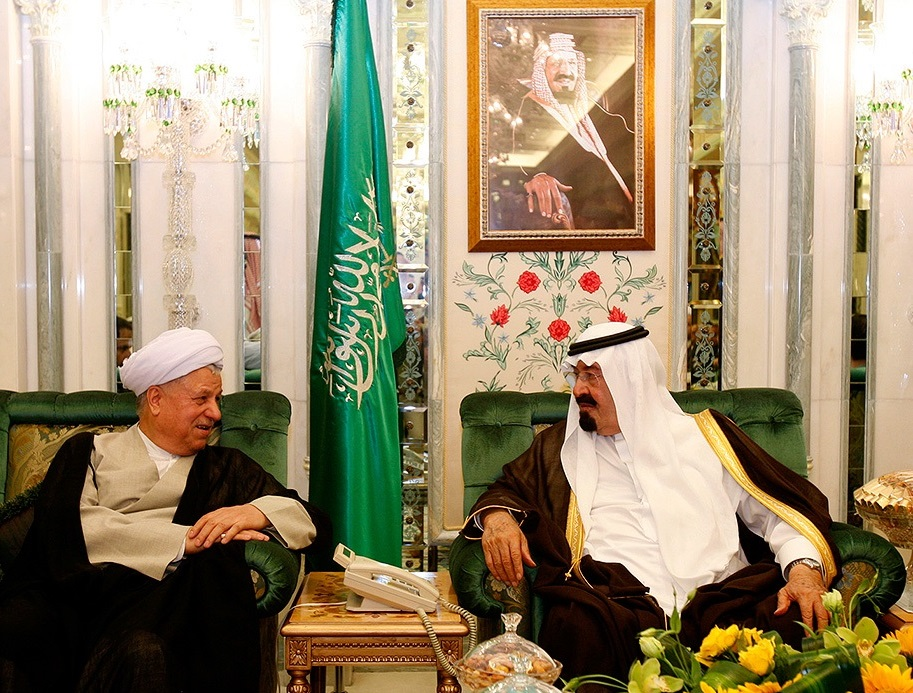
Rafsanjani meeting with Abdullah of Saudi Arabia

Iran gave humanitarian help to the victims of the conflict. Iran sent truckloads of food and medicine to Iraq, and thousands of Kuwaiti refugees were given shelter in Iran.

Rafsanjani voiced support to Prince Abdullah's peace initiative and to "everything the Palestinians agree to". He also stated that what he called "Iran's international interests" must take precedence over those of Iranian allies in Syria and Lebanon.

Ayatollah Rafsanjani was a supporter of Iran's nuclear program. In 2007 Rafsanjani reiterated that the use of weapons of mass destruction was not part of the Islamic Republic culture. Rafsanjani said: "You [US and allies] are saying that you cannot trust Iran would not use its nuclear achievements in the military industries, but we are ready to give you full assurances in this respect." According to The Economist, he is regarded by many Iranians "as the only person with the guile and clout to strike a deal with the West to end economic sanctions" imposed upon the country due to its nuclear program.

=== Construction ===
After the end of the Iran-Iraq war, the need for a road map for the future was felt in order to end the historical gap between the country Iran development programs in the first government of Rafsanjani. The fifth government soon managed to recover the economy and moved the arrowhead of the indicators in a different direction. The first action of the fifth government was devoted to designing the first development plan of the Islamic Republic of Iran. The men that Rafsanjani had chosen to run the country took over the task of drafting the plan, and the first development plan was approved by the parliament at the end of 1990. The general goals of this program are rebuilding and equipping the defense base, rebuilding and modernizing production and infrastructure capacities and population centers damaged during the imposed war, quantitative expansion and qualitative improvement of public culture, creating economic growth, providing the minimum basic needs of the people, determining and modifying the pattern Consumption, organization reform and executive and judicial management of the country were considered. The most important characteristics of the two periods of Rafsanjani's government were the developmental and building approach, the establishment of a free economy in the country, and the use of Extraterritorial jurisdiction managers and technocrats. Characteristic of the construction government was that it paid much attention to the development of industrial and transportation infrastructure.

== Post-presidency (1997–2017) ==
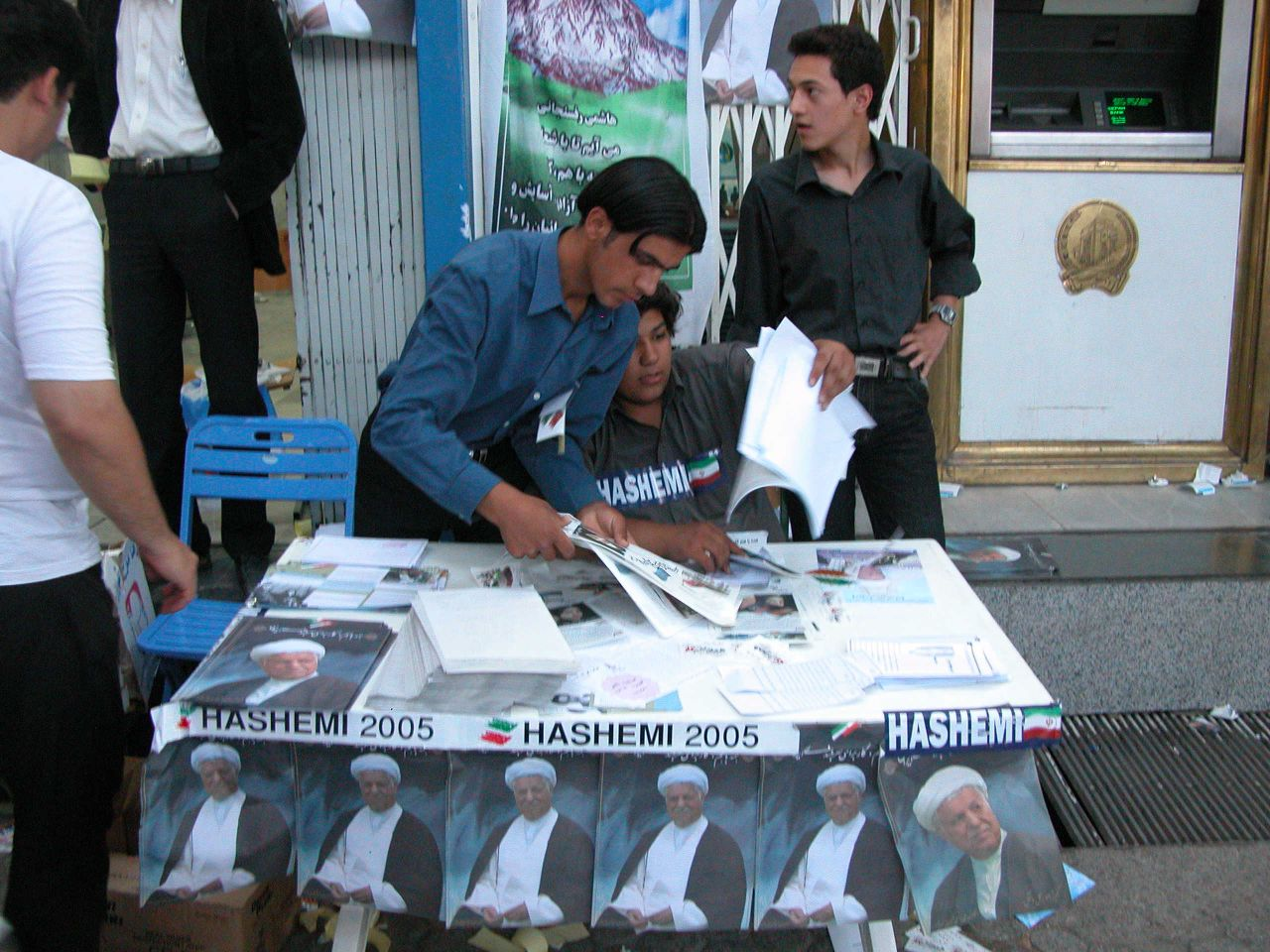
Rafsanjani supporters in the 2005 election

Post-presidency, Rafsanjani delivered a sermon at Tehran University in the summer of 1999 praising government use of force to suppress student demonstrations.

In 2000, in the first election after the end of his presidency, Rafsanjani ran again for Parliament. In the Tehran contest, Rafsanjani came in 30th, or last, place. At first, he was not among the 30 representatives of Tehran elected, as announced by the Iranian Ministry of the Interior, but the Council of Guardians then ruled numerous ballots void, leading to accusations of ballot fraud in Rafsanjani's favor.

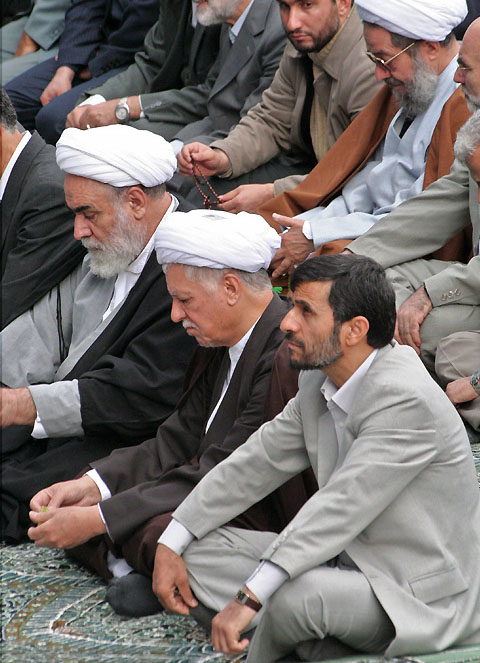
Rafsanjani in Eid al-Fitr prayer, while Mahmoud Ahmadinejad is sitting at his side

In December 2006, Rafsanjani was elected to the Assembly of Experts representing Tehran with more than 1.5 million votes, which was more than any other candidate. Ahmadinejad's opponents won the majority of local election seats. On 4 September 2007 he was elected Chairman of the Assembly of Experts, the body that selects Iran's supreme leader, in what was considered a blow to the supporters of Mahmoud Ahmadinejad. He won the chairmanship with 41 votes of the 76 cast. His ultraconservative opponent, Ayatollah Ahmad Jannati, received 31 votes. Rafsanjani was re-elected to the position on 10 March 2009, running against Mohammad Yazdi. He received 51 votes compared to Yazdi's 26. On 8 March 2011, he withdrew from the election and Ayatollah Mohammad Reza Mahdavi Kani was elected as his replacement.

Following his presidency, Rafsanjani also became an advocate of greater freedom of expression and tolerance in Iranian society. In a speech on 17 July 2009, Rafsanjani criticized restriction of media and suppression of activists, and put emphasis on the role and vote of people in the Islamic Republic constitution. The event has been considered by analysts as the most important and most turbulent Friday prayer in the history of contemporary Iran. Nearly 1.5 to 2.5 million people attended the speech in Tehran.

=== 2009 election protests ===
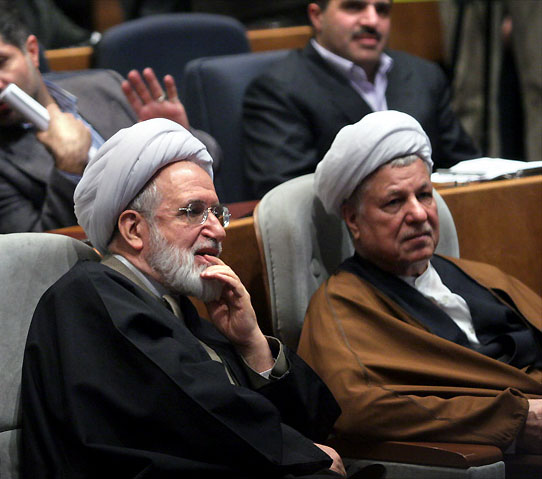
Rafsanjani with one of the protest leaders, Mehdi Karroubi

During the 2009 presidential election, Rafsanjani's former rival and incumbent president, Mahmoud Ahmadinejad, won a disputed landslide victory over challenger Mir-Hossein Mousavi. His daughter was arrested on 21 June by plain clothes Basij during the subsequent protest and later sentenced to six months in jail on charges of spreading propaganda against the Islamic Republic.

Ayatollah Akbar Rafsanjani was chairman of the Assembly of Experts, which is responsible for appointing or removing the Supreme Leader, who had been rumored to not be in the best of health. After the disputed results of the election were certified by the Supreme Leader, Rafsanjani was reported to have called a meeting of the Assembly of Experts, but it is unknown what the outcome or disposition of this meeting actually was. During this time Rafsanjani relocated from Tehran to Qom, where the country's religious leaders sit. However, for the most part, Rafsanjani was silent about the controversial 12 June election and its aftermath.

On 17 July 2009, Rafsanjani publicly addressed the election crisis, mass arrests and the issue of freedom of expression during Friday prayers. The prayers witnessed an extremely large crowd that resembled the Friday prayers early after the revolution. Supporters of both reformist and conservative parties took part in the event. During prayers, Rafsanjani argued the following:

All of us the establishment, the security forces, police, parliament and even protestors should move within the framework of law... We should open the doors to debates. We should not keep so many people in prison. We should free them to take care of their families. ... It is impossible to restore public confidence overnight, but we have to let everyone speak out. ... We should have logical and brotherly discussions and our people will make their judgments. ... We should let our media write within the framework of the law and we should not impose restrictions on them. ... We should let our media even criticize us. Our security forces, our police and other organs have to guarantee such a climate for criticism.

His support for the Green Movement reinvigorated his image among the urban middle-class segments of Iranian society who made up the bulk of the movement and solidified Rafsanjani's role as a backer of factions within Iran that advocated the reform of the system to ensure its survival.

=== Assembly of Experts election ===
On 8 March 2011 Rafsanjani lost his post as chairman of the powerful Assembly of Experts, replaced by Ayatollah Mohammad-Reza Mahdavi Kani. Rafsanjani stated that he withdrew from the election for chairman to "avoid division." The loss was said to be the result of intensive lobbying "in recent weeks" by "hardliners and supporters" of President Mahmoud Ahmadinejad, and part of Rafsanjani's gradual loss of power over the years.

=== 2013 presidential elections ===
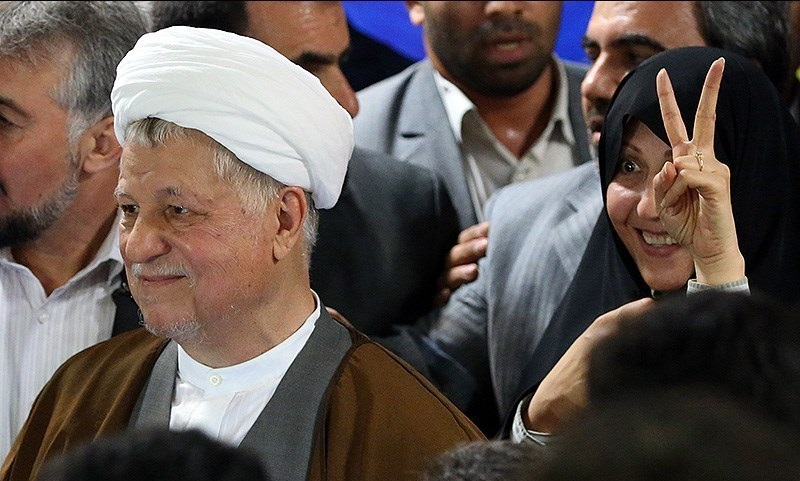
Rafsanjani announcing his candidacy with his daughter, Fatemeh accompanied him.

On 11 May 2013, Rafsanjani registered for the 14 June presidential election with just minutes to spare. Former reformist president Mohammad Khatami endorsed him. However, on 21 May 2013, Iran's electoral center, Guardian Council disqualified him from standing in the presidential election. On 11 June 2013, Rafsanjani endorsed moderate Hassan Rouhani in the elections for Iran's presidency saying the candidate was "more suitable" than others for presidency.

=== Later years ===
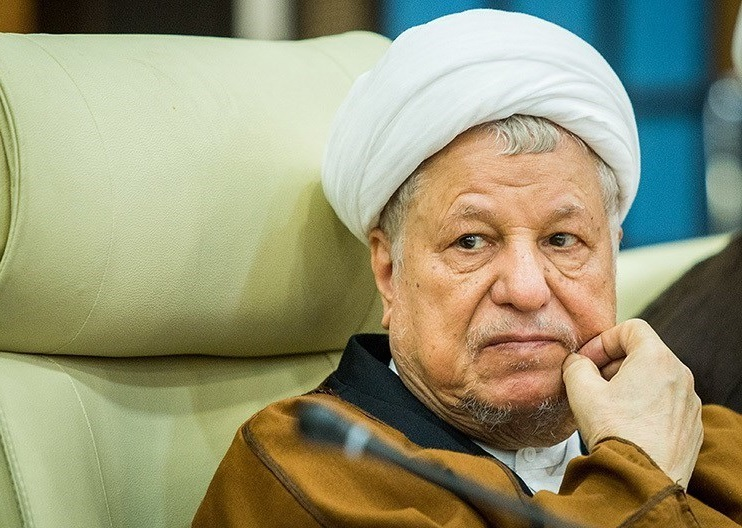
Rafsanjani during a visit to Bushir on 23 December 2016, two weeks before his death

Reformers had enjoyed his support in recent years, helping to tilt the balance of power towards more moderate forces who managed to win the presidential poll in 2013 with the victory of Hassan Rouhani and parliamentary elections in 2016. Rafsanjani was viewed as having enough influence over Khamenei to bring moderate views into consideration. His death was therefore regarded as an event that strengthened the power of hardliners and weakened the influence of moderates. He also kept his traditional connections with the clergy in the holy city of Qom and with conservative forces within the political establishment, which made it difficult for hardliners to form a strong front against moderate forces.

After winning reelection to his seat at Assembly of Experts as Tehran district's first person, Rafsanjani announced that it was the last time that he joined an election as a candidate and will be retired from politics at the end of the current term. He also said "Now I can die with peace of mind" after seeing election of a moderate parliament in the 2016 legislative election.

== Death ==
Rafsanjani died on 8 January 2017, at 19:30 (UTC+03:30) due to a heart attack in a pool. He was brought immediately to Tajrish's Shohada-ye Tajrish Hospital in north Tehran, as reported by Iranian state-run media. He was 82 years old at the time of his death. The government announced three days of national mourning and a public holiday on his funeral day. Black banners were raised in Tehran and other cities and some posters showed the Supreme Leader and Rafsanjani together smiling. Five days of mourning also observed in the southern province of Kerman, where Ayatollah Rafsanjani's hometown of Rafsanjan is located.

Two months after his death, a highway in Northern Tehran was renamed in his honour. Many streets in other cities also named Rafsanjani. The central building of Azad University also named as Building and a statue of him was installed outside of the building. Kerman International Airport was also renamed to Ayatollah Hashemi Rafsanjani Airport.

In 2018 Hassan Rouhani ordered the Iranian supreme national security council to reopen an investigation into Rafsanjani's death.

=== Assassination allegations ===
In a 2025 interview, Faezeh Hashemi, Akbar Rafsanjani's daughter, alleged that he was assassinated, not by Russia or Israel, but by the highest echelons of power in the Islamic Republic, because "he sided with the people and spoke out" and "he was in their way- so he had to be removed". Rafsanjani's other daughter, Fatemeh, stated that two months before his death she was approached by two individuals who threatened that he "would be killed in a way that would make it appear a natural death". The combination of suspicious circumstances surrounding his death has given additional clout to the allegations of foul play, these include delays in his transport to the hospital, blocked access to CCTV footage from his office and his supposed place of death, absence of post-mortem examinations despite the family's requests, and the disappearance of his diaries and will from his office soon after his death. According to Rafsanjani's family, the Supreme National Security Council's official report stated that his body contained radiation levels ten times the safe limit. The official investigation into the death of Rafsanjani was concluded by the Secretary of Iran's Supreme National Security Council at the time, Ali Shamkhani, who stated that it was "completely natural and without any ambiguity".

== Controversies ==
=== Accusations ===
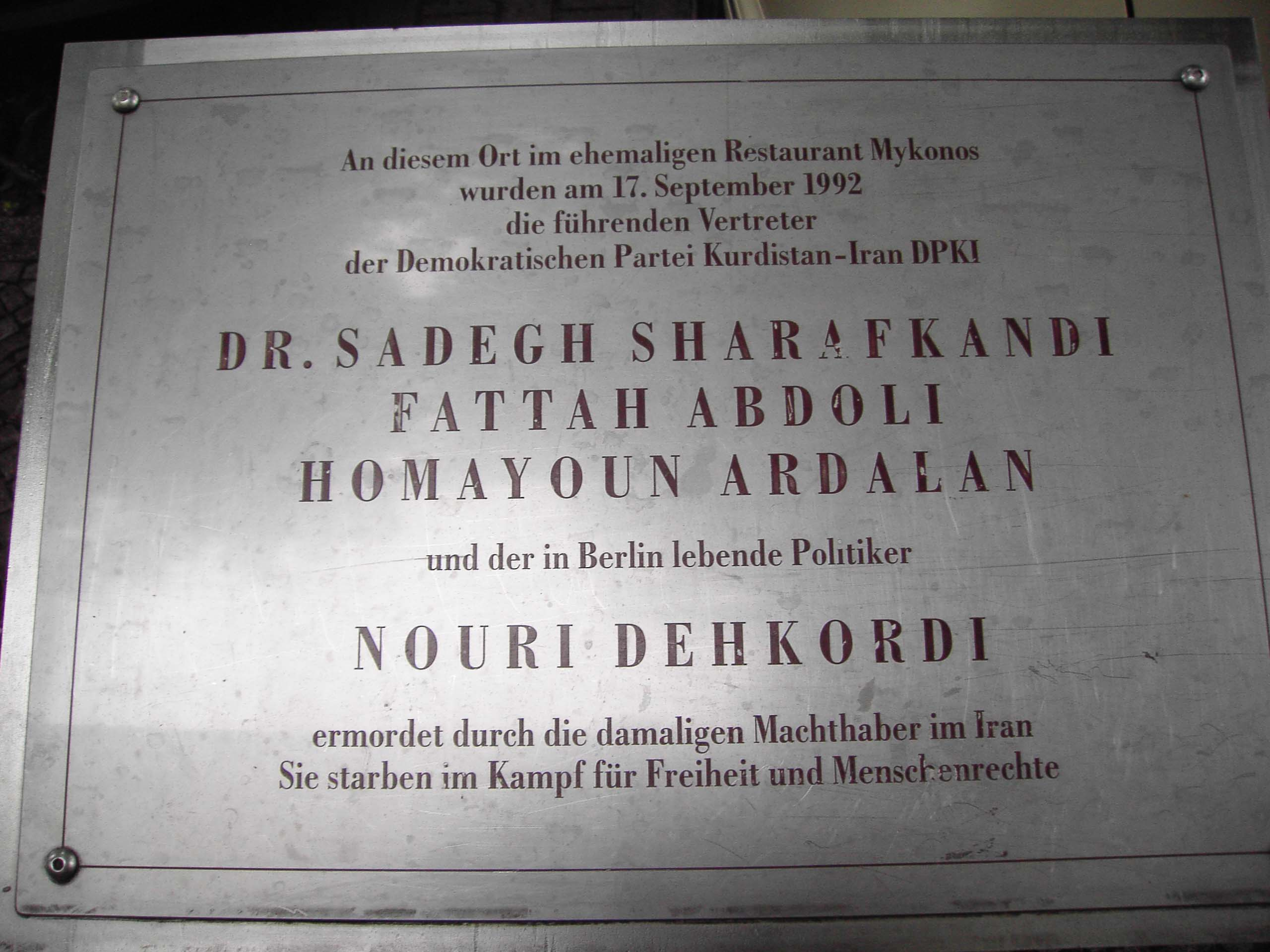
The names of the victims appear in the commemorative plaque in front of Mykonos restaurant in Berlin

Rafsanjani was sought by the Argentinian government for ordering the 1994 AMIA bombing in Buenos Aires. It was based on the allegation that senior Iranian officials planned the attack in an August 1993 meeting, including Khamenei, the Supreme Leader, Mohammad Hejazi, Khamenei's intelligence and security advisor, Rafsanjani, then president, Ali Fallahian, then intelligence minister, and Ali Akbar Velayati, then foreign minister.

=== Tension with Ahmadinejad ===
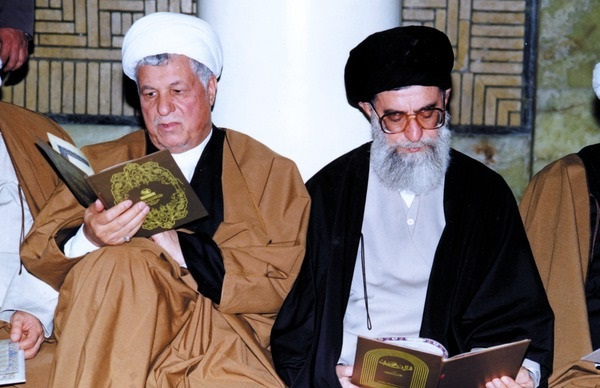
Khamenei and Akbar Hashemi Rafsanjani

After his loss at the presidential elections in 2005, a growing tension between him and President Ahmadinejad arose. Rafsanjani had criticized Ahmadinejad's administration several times for conducting a purge of government officials, slow move towards privatization and recently hostile foreign policy in particular the atomic energy policy. In return Ahmadinejad fought back that Rafsanjani failed to differentiate privatization with the corrupt takeover of government-owned companies and of foreign policies which led to sanctions against Iran in 1995 and 1996. He also implicitly denounced Rafsanjani and his followers by calling those who criticize his nuclear program as "traitors".

During a debate with Mir-Hossein Moussavi in 2009 presidential election, Ahmadinejad accused Rafsanjani of corruption. Rafsanjani released an open letter in which he complained about what he called the president's "insults, lies and false allegations" and asked the country's supreme leader, Ali Khamenei, to intervene.

=== Tension with Khamenei ===
In his latter years, Rafsanjani had disagreements with Ali Khamenei who had the last say in everything in Iran. Khamenei even indirectly called Rafsanjani a traitor, and according to political analyst, Mehdi Mahdavi-Azad, in the months prior to his death, Rafsanjani openly stated that he had made a mistake in choosing Khamenei as supreme leader. Following his death, Khamanei said of Rafsanjani, "I don't know any other figure with whom I have had so many shared experiences and long history in ups and downs of this era which made history." However, during a speech on the day of Rafsanjani's death, using a play on Rafsanjani's first name Akbar, Khamenei stated that it would cause harm to the Islamic Republic if a “reprobate or misled brother” turned out to be the “bigger Satan” and played the role of the real Satan in misleading the people", further stating that "this person is our enemy, too". In the traditional prayer for the dead, Khamenei also noticeably omitted the sentence attesting that the deceased lived a life of "benevolence and goodness".

== Views ==
=== Political parties ===
Before Iranian Revolution, Rafsanjani was active in the anti-Shah activities and reportedly associated with the Islamic Coalition's shura-ye ruhaniyat (lit. 'Council of the Clergy') and the People's Mujahidin.

Although Rafsanjani was a member of the pragmatic-conservative Combatant Clergy Association, he had a close bond to the Executives of Construction Party and Moderation and Development Party. In 2009, Rafsanjani ceased activity in the Combatant Clergy Association, despite remaining a member.

His political affiliations and alliances shifted between conservative and reformist factions since the election of Mohammad Khatami, supporting reformers in that election, but going back to the conservative camp in the 2000 parliamentary elections as a result of the reformist party severely criticizing and refusing to accept him as their candidate. Reformists, including Akbar Ganji, accused him of involvement in murdering dissidents and writers during his presidency. In the end, the major differences between the Kargozaran and the reformists party weakened both and eventually resulted in their loss at the presidential elections in 2005. However, Rafsanjani regained close ties with the reformers since he lost the 2005 presidential elections to Mahmoud Ahmadinejad.

=== Jews, the Holocaust and Israel ===
Rafsanjani said that the detonation of a single nuclear weapon inside Israel "will annihilate the entire country". In a Quds Day sermon on 23 January 1998, he claimed that Israel was "much worse than Hitler," accusing Zionists of killing over a million Palestinians. He questioned the Holocaust death toll, stating Hitler had killed "only 200,000 Jews," and dismissed the figure of six million as "a propaganda act by the Zionists."

== Electoral history ==
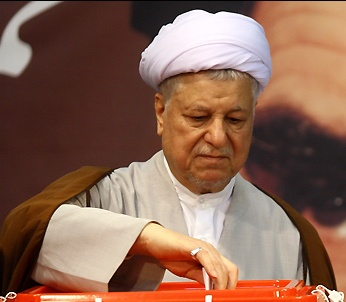
Rafsanjani casting his vote in 2013 presidential election

Year	Election	Votes	%	Rank	Notes
1980	Parliament	1,151,514	≈54	15th	Won
1982	Assembly of Experts	2,675,008	84		Won
1984	Parliament	▲1,891,264	▲81.9	1st	Won
1988	Parliament	▼1,573,587	▲82.3	1st	Won
1989	President	15,537,394	96.1	1st	Won
1990	Assembly of Experts	▼1,604,834	▲85		Won
1993	President	▼10,449,933	▼64	1st	Won
1998	Assembly of Experts	▲1,682,188	▼60		Won
2000	Parliament	▼749,884	▼25.58	30th	Won but withdrew
2005	President	▼6,211,937	▼21.13	1st	Went to run-off
2005	President run-off	▲10,046,701	▲35.93	2nd	Lost
2006	Assembly of Experts	▼1,564,197	▼ ≈41	1st	Won
2013	President	–			Disqualified
2016	Assembly of Experts	▲2,301,492	▲51.13	1st	Won

== Personal life ==
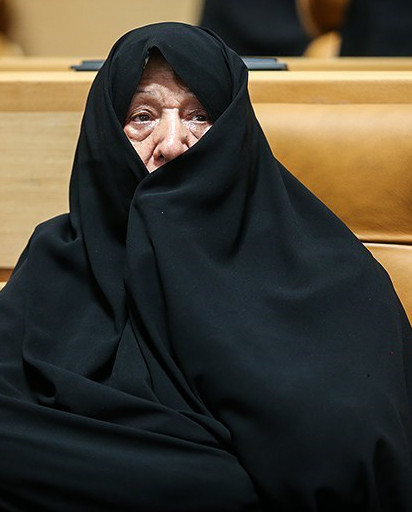
Marashi

From his marriage to Effat Marashi in 1958, Rafsanjani had three sons: Mohsen, Mehdi, and Yasser, as well as two daughters, Fatemeh and Faezeh. Only Faezeh Hashemi chose a political life, which led to her becoming a Majlis representative and then the publisher of the weekly newspaper Zan (meaning Woman in English), which was closed in February 1999. In 2016, his daughter, Faezeh Hashemi, sparked a debate on religious persecution in Iran by visiting the female leader of the persecuted Baháʼí religious minority. The two women had met in prison, when Faezeh was serving a six-month sentence for "spreading propaganda against the system". Rafsanjani's daughter, Fatemeh is President of Charity Foundation for Special Diseases and Mohsen was chairman of Tehran Metro Organization and now is vice president of Azad University. His wife, Effat is the granddaughter of Mohammed Kazem Yazdi.

=== Assets ===
The Rafsanjani family took their name from his great-grandfather, whose last name was Hashem. When Akbar Hashemi was born, his father was a rich businessman with a valuable pistachio business.

Hashemi and his partners also owned Islamic Azad University, worth an estimated US$20–25 billion.

Rafsanjani's three sons own properties in Dubai, including two apartments in the Burj Khalifa.

=== Assassination attempts ===
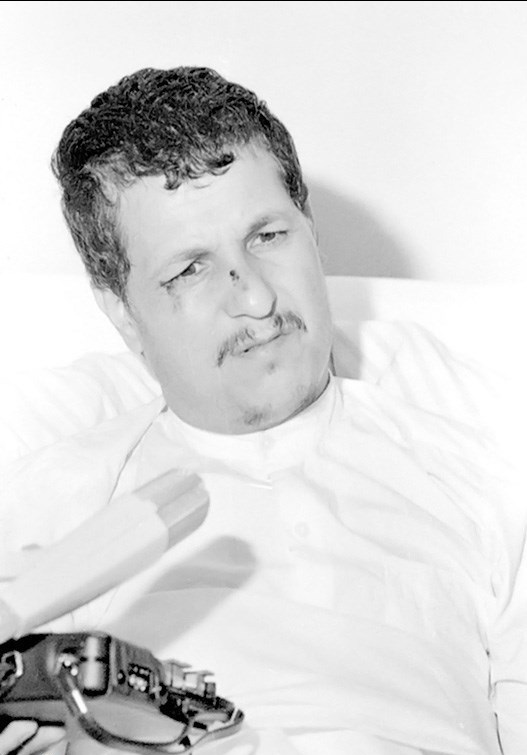
Rafsanjani speaking with the media after the first assassination attempt

Months after the revolution, Rafsanjani was shot once in the stomach by one of the groups vying for power amid the political turmoil. He was not seriously wounded, and neither was his wife who jumped in front to shield him from the attack. "Great men of history do not die", Khomeini said in announcing that Rafsanjani had survived.

== Books ==
- Memories
- The Combat Era
- Amir Kabir: the Hero of Fighting against Imperialism (1968)
- Tafsir Rahnama
- Explicit Letters

In addition, the full text of his Friday Prayer sermons and his congress keynote speeches are also published separately. Based on his diary, viewpoints, speeches and interviews, several independent books have been published so far.

- Encyclopedia of Quran (Farhang-e-Quran)

The book in fact considered as a key to the subjects and concepts of Quran. The book has been written by Rafsanjani and several other scholars.

== Reception and legacy ==
Although he was a close follower of Ayatollah Khomeini and considered as a central elite during the Islamic revolution, he strove for reconstruction of the shattered country after the war and to this end selected his ministers from among western-educated technocrats and social reformers. His cabinet was largely a reformist one. Rafsanjani acquired both the support of Khomeini on one hand and the parliament on the other. He led efforts to move the economy towards the free-market system. Rafsanjani's partnership with conservative politicians led to disagreement between him on one side and Khatami and other reformists on the other. The period of Rafsanjani's presidency could be considered to be the beginning of the Reformist movement . His prominent use of executive power and his degree of control over Iranian politics earned him the nickname "Akbar Shah".

== See also ==
- Government of Akbar Hashemi Rafsanjani (1989–97)
- List of ayatollahs
- List of members in the First Term of the Council of Experts

Political offices
Preceded by Hashem Sabbaghian	Minister of Interior; Acting; 1979–1980	Succeeded by Mohammad-Reza Mahdavi Kani
Preceded by Ali Khamenei	President of Iran; 1989–1997	Succeeded by Mohammad Khatami
Preceded by Ali Khamenei	Chairman of the Expediency Discernment Council; 1989–2017	Succeeded by Ali Movahedi-Kermani; Acting
Preceded by Ali Meshkini	Chairman of the Assembly of Experts; 2007–2011	Succeeded by Mohammad-Reza Mahdavi Kani
Military offices
New title	Deputy Commander-in-Chief of the Iranian Armed Forces; 1988–1989	Vacant
Academic offices
Preceded by None	Chairman of Board of Trustees of Islamic Azad University; 1982–2017	Succeeded by Ali Akbar Velayati
Assembly seats
Vacant Title last held by Javad Saeed	Speaker of the Parliament; 1980–1989	Succeeded by Mehdi Karroubi
Honorary titles
Preceded by Fakhreddin Hejazi	Most voted MP for Tehran, Rey, Shemiranat and Eslamshahr; 1984, 1988	Succeeded by Ali-Akbar Mousavi Hosseini
