= Jafar Towfighi =

Iranian engineer and politician

- جعفر توفیقی
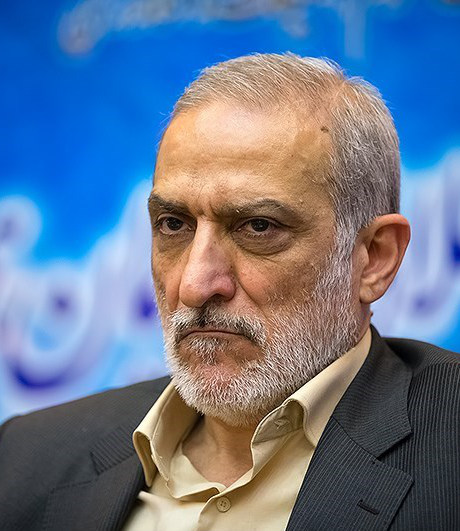
- October 2014

Minister of Science, Research and Technology
- In office 17 August 2013 – 27 October 2013; Acting
- President: Hassan Rouhani
- Preceded by: Kamran Daneshjoo
- Succeeded by: Reza Farajidana
- In office 8 October 2003 – 24 August 2005
- President: Mohammad Khatami
- Preceded by: Mostafa Moeen
- Succeeded by: Mohammad Mehdi Zahedi

Personal details
- Born: Jafar Towfighi Darian; 19 March 1956 (age 70) Tehran, Iran
- Party: Omid Iranian Foundation
- Education: Shiraz University; Bucharest Polytechnic Institute
- Website: modares.ac.ir

Jafar Towfighi Darian (Persian: جعفر توفیقی داریان; born 19 March 1956) is an Iranian chemical engineer, academic, politician and senior consultant of the ministry of science, research and technology who served as minister of science, research and technology for two terms. First in the cabinet headed by President Mohammad Khatami from 2003 till 2005, and second in 2013 as acting minister.

== Early life and education ==
Towfighi was born in Tehran on 19 March 1956. He holds a master's degree in chemical engineering, which he received from Shiraz University in 1981. Then he obtained a PhD again in chemical engineering from Bucharest Polytechnic Institute in Romania in 1986.

== Career ==
Towfighi began his academic career at Tarbiat Modares University in 1987. He served at different positions at the university until 1996 when he was appointed advisor to deputy education minister. In 1997, he was appointed deputy education minister and was in office until 2003. Then he was named as minister of science, research and technology, and his term lasted until 2005. After working as the dean of the faculty of energy at Sharif University of Technology from 2008 to 2010, he began to work at Tarbiat Modarres University's faculty of engineering as a full professor. He was Mohammad Reza Aref's campaign manager during the 2013 presidential election.

On 17 August 2013, he was appointed acting minister of science by Hassan Rouhani following the nominated candidate for the post was rejected by the Majlis on 15 August.

Towfighi was among hundreds of academic faculty who signed a letter condemning the government's crackdown of the 2025–2026 Iranian protests, and failure to prevent a future attack on Iran by the United States and Israel in response to the crackdown.
