= Gholam-Ali Haddad-Adel =

Iranian politician (born 1945)

- غلامعلی حداد عادل
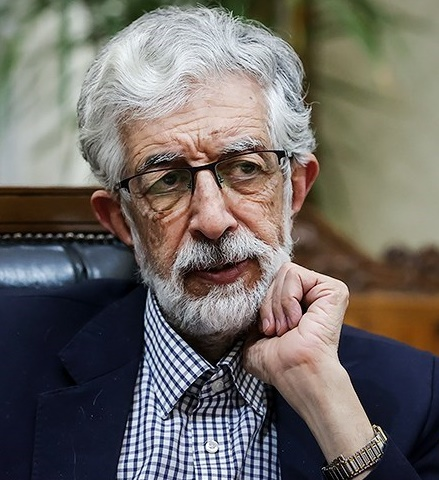
- Haddad-Adel in 2023

Member of the Expediency Discernment Council
- Incumbent
- Assumed office 14 March 2012
- Appointed by: Ali Khamenei
- Chairman: Akbar Hashemi Rafsanjani; Mohammad-Ali Movahedi Kermani (acting); Mahmoud Hashemi Shahroudi; Sadiq Larijani
- In office 16 March 2002 – 29 May 2004
- Appointed by: Ali Khamenei
- Chairman: Akbar Hashemi Rafsanjani
- Succeeded by: Mehdi Karroubi

4th Speaker of the Parliament of Iran
- In office 29 May 2004 (Note: Acting: 29 May – 5 June 2004) – 27 May 2008
- Deputy: Mohammad-Reza Bahonar; Hassan Aboutorabi
- Preceded by: Mehdi Karroubi
- Succeeded by: Ali Larijani

Member of the Parliament of Iran
- In office 28 May 2000 – 27 May 2016
- Constituency: Tehran, Rey, Shemiranat and Eslamshahr

Personal details
- Born: Gholam-Ali Mashhad Mohammad-Ali Haddad; 9 May 1945 (age 81) Tehran, Imperial State of Iran
- Party: Popular Front of Islamic Revolution Forces; Alliance of Builders of Islamic Iran
- Other political affiliations: Islamic Republic Party (1980–1987)
- Spouse: Tayyebeh Mahrouzadeh
- Children: 4
- Relatives: Mojtaba Khamenei (son-in-law)
- Education: University of Tehran; Shiraz University
- Website: haddadadel.ir

Gholam-Ali Haddad-Adel (Persian: غلامعلی حداد عادل; born 9 May 1945) is an Iranian politician and former chairman of the Parliament. Haddad-Adel is a member of the Expediency Discernment Council.

He was the first non-cleric in the post since the Iranian Revolution of 1979. He was one of the candidates in the 2013 presidential election but withdrew on 10 June, four days before the election. He is part of "neo-principilist" group in the Iranian political scene.

== Early life and education ==
Haddad-Adel was born in Tehran on 9 May 1945 into a business family. He received a bachelor's degree in physics from the University of Tehran and also, a master's degree in physics from University of Shiraz. He also holds a PhD in philosophy from the University of Tehran which he received in 1975.

He studied Islamic philosophy under Morteza Motahhari and also under Sayyed Hossein Nasr, a noted critic of Marxism.

== Career ==
Following the Iranian Revolution Haddad-Adel became a member of the Islamic Republic Party and he served in many governmental posts, including deputy culture and Islamic guidance minister (1979) and deputy education minister (1982–1993). Since 1995 he has been serving as the head of the Iranian Academy of Persian Language and Literature (except for August 2004 – 2008). He is also the executive director of the Encyclopaedia Islamica Foundation. He contributed to the establishment of the national Scientific Olympiads in Iran.

Haddad-Adel served at the Majlis for thirteen years, over four terms. He officially ranked as the 33rd candidate of Tehran in the 2000 parliamentary election after recounts by the Council of Guardians which led to an annulment of 700,000 Tehrani votes and the removal of Alireza Rajaei and Ali Akbar Rahmani from the top 30, and the withdrawal of Akbar Hashemi Rafsanjani. Haddad-Adel collected the most votes from Tehran four years later, while most Tehranis refused to vote in 2004 election because many reformist candidates where not allowed to run. He was supported by the Abadgaran alliance and became the Speaker of Parliament for one year beginning 6 June 2004, with 226 votes out of 259, running unopposed. He became the first non-clerical speaker since the revolution. From 2008 to 2026, he served as an advisor to Supreme Leader Ali Khamenei. In 2012, he ran for the Majlis speakership, but lost the bid.

He is also a member of the High Council of Cultural Revolution and the Expediency Discernment Council.

=== Speaker of Parliament ===
As the speaker of Parliament, Haddad-Adel condemned the bombings of the al-Askari Shrine in 2006 and 2007. He added that Islamic countries must promote solidarity through guaranteeing unity and security against common enemies. In January 2008 Haddad-Adel visited Cairo for talks with then-President Hosni Mubarak, making him the first senior Iranian parliamentary official to conduct high-level talks with Egyptian counterparts after the Islamic revolution.

=== Presidential candidacy ===
In October 2012 Haddad-Adel formed a coalition named 2+1 together with Mohammad Bagher Ghalibaf and Ali Akbar Velayati in October 2012, ahead of the upcoming presidential election. He withdrew his candidacy a few days before the election, and said in a statement carried by the semi-official Mehr News Agency: "With my withdrawal I ask the dear people to strictly observe the criteria of the Supreme Leader of the Revolution [Khamenei] when they vote for candidates."

He did not endorse a single candidate, but called for a hardline conservative victory. "I advise the dear people to take a correct decision so that either a conservative wins in the first round, or if the election runs to a second round, the competition between two conservatives."

== President of Academy of Persian Language and Literature ==
Haddad-Adel is also the second president of the Academy of Persian Language and Literature. His presidency at the academy has focused on language policy and planning, and promotion of the Persian language in all domains.

== Electoral history ==
Year	Election	Votes	%	Rank	Notes
2000	Parliament	556,054	25.20	29th	Won after recount
2004	Parliament	▲888,276	▲50.45	1st	Won
2008	Parliament	▼844,230	▼44.21	1st	Won
2012	Parliament	▲1,119,474	▲47.94	1st	Won
2013	President	–			Withdrew
2016	Parliament	▼1,057,639	▼32.57	31st	Lost

== Affiliation ==
Haddad-Adel is a senior member in the conservative umbrella organizations Alliance of Builders of Islamic Iran, as well as the Popular Front of Islamic Revolution Forces (JAMNA) and is considered close to the Society of Devotees of the Islamic Revolution and the Society of Pathseekers of the Islamic Revolution.

== Public image ==
According to a poll conducted in March 2016 by Information and Public Opinion Solutions LLC (iPOS) among Iranian citizens, Haddad-Adel has 51% approval and 27% disapproval ratings and thus a +24% net popularity; while 13% of responders don't know him.

== Views ==
One of Haddad-Adel's most significant views has been on the hijab in western civilization. According to him in the book of The Culture of Nakedness and the Nakedness of Culture, the issue of veiling and clothing in the West is problematic. He believes that materialism is the mentality which is governed by Western culture. The culture is based on the priority of material life, with no value in anything beyond materialism. The origin of materialism as a worldview is humanism, according to the renaissance. According to Haddad-Adel, religion serves an important role in Iranian education. Referring to the dominance of religious thought in education, he pointed out that religious education is one result of the victory of the Islamic revolution. He believes that the problem of human freedom is a permanent one. The problem itself has changed with the appearance of new theories in scientific and philosophic domains, particularly in the field of anthropology. He is also an admirer of the development of non-governmental higher education, and believes that developing such schools would lead to decreased demands on the administration of education and pedagogy.

== Personal life ==
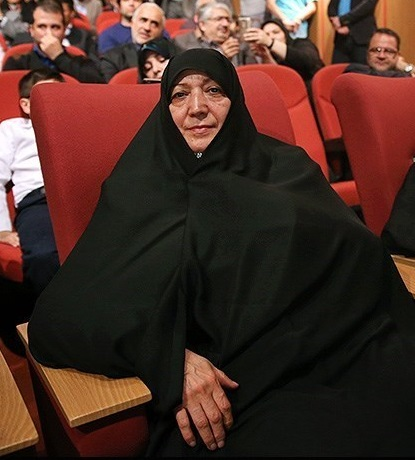
Tayyebeh Mahrouzadeh, Haddad-Adel's wife, in 2016

Haddad-Adel is married to Tayyebeh Mahrouzadeh with whom he has one son and three daughters. Their daughter Zahra married Mojtaba Khamenei, the son of Ali Khamenei, Supreme Leader of Iran. This has led to the popular belief that he was among the most trusted and backed allies of Ayatollah Khamenei. Zahra was killed along with her father-in-law in the U.S.–Israeli airstrikes during the 2026 Iran war.

== Publications ==
- Farhang-e Berahnegi va Berahnegi-e Farhangi (Culture of Nudity and Nudity of Culture), Soroush, Tehran, 1981, translated into Urdu, Arabic, and Turkish.
- Haj: Namaaz-e Bozorg (Hajj: the Grand Prayer), Sana, Tehran, 2000.
- Daaneshnaame-ye Jahaan-e Eslam (The Encyclopaedia of the world of Islam), Encyclopaedia Islamica Foundation, Volumes 2–6 (as supervisor), 1996–2001.
- Textbooks on sociology, social science, Civil studies and Qur'an, for high school and guidance schools.
- History & Histography, 2012 ISBN 978-1-908-43304-6
- Tafsir: Qur'anic Exegesis, 2012 ISBN 978-1-908-43300-8
- Hawza-Yi 'Ilmiyya Shi'I Teaching Institution: An Entry from Encyclopaedia of the World of Islam, 2012ISBN 978-1-908-43306-0
- Law: Selected Entries from Encyclopaedia of the World of Islam - Encyclopaedia of the World of Islam (EWI), 2013 ISBN 978-1-908-43313-8
- Historians of the Islamic World, 2018 (Editor) ISBN 978-9-670-52642-3
- Muslim Organisations in the Twentieth Century: Selected Entries from Encyclopaedia of the World of Islam, 2022 (Editor) ISBN 978-1-908-43309-1
- Historical Sources of the Islamic World: Selected Entries from Encyclopaedia of the World of Islam - Encyclopaedia of the World of Islam (EWI), 2013 ISBN 978-1-908-43311-4
- Sufism: An Entry from Encyclopaedia of the World of Islam, 2013 ISBN 978-1-908-43308-4

=== Translations ===
- Tamhidaat: Moghaddame-i baraaye har Maa-ba'd-ot-tabi'e-ye Aayande ke be onvaan-e yek Elm Arze Shavad, a translation of Immanuel Kant's Prolegomena to any Future Metaphysics, Iran University Press, Tehran, 1988.
- Nazariye-ye Ma'refat dar Falsafe-ye Kaant, a translation of Justus Hartnack's Kant's Theory of Knowledge, Fekr-e Rooz, Tehran, 2000.
- Translation of Quran

He translated Quran to Persian. The translation of the Quran by him lasted for 9 years. He tried to use all new and old translations and consult with other scholars of the Quran during the translation. The book has been exhibited in the nineteenth international fair of the Quran in Iran. He tried to pave the way for a more easy understanding of the Quran for all. The translation of Quran according to Hadad is based on the conceptual translation. He pointed out that since many Persian people could not read very well Arabic language then he undertake the task.

In 2019, he published a travelogue titled I Went to the Desert and Found a Downpour of Love. Haddad-Adel describes his personal memories and experiences during the 2017 Arba'in trip in this book. Additionally, he provides a report on this spiritual journey, the emotions of those present at the annual ritual, and the mawkib keepers and organizers who host and assist those traveling to Imam Hussein's (AS) shrine in Karbala for the Arbaeen celebration.

== Awards and recognition ==
- In 2019 the organizers of The 17th Golden Pen Awards honored Gholam-Ali Haddad-Adel as the Literary Figure of the Year.

== Notes ==
Assembly seats
Preceded by Mehdi Karroubi	Speaker of Parliament of Iran; 2004–2008	Succeeded by Ali Larijani
Preceded by Ali-Akbar Hosseini as Head of the Hezbollah fraction	Parliamentary leader of the Principlists; Head of the Minority fraction 2000–2004	Succeeded by Mohammad-Reza Bahonar as Head of the Principlists fraction
New title	Head of the Principlists fraction 2012–2016	Vacant
Honorary titles
Preceded by Mohammad Reza Khatami	Most voted MP for Tehran, Rey, Shemiranat and Eslamshahr; 2004, 2008, 2012	Succeeded by Mohammad Reza Aref
Academic offices
Preceded by Hassan Habibi	President of the Academy of Persian Language and Literature; 1999–2004	Succeeded by Hassan Habibi
Preceded by Hassan Habibi	President of the Academy of Persian Language and Literature; 2010–present	Incumbent
