= BARAN Foundation =

Iranian think tank and not-for-profit organization

- Founder: Founding Board: Mohammad Khatami; Hassan Habibi; Mohammad Reza Aref; Safdar Hosseini; Jafar Towfighi; Mohammad Bagherian; Mohammad Sattarifar
- Established: 2005
- Mission: "Promotion of freedom, growth and development in Iran"
- Focus: Politics
- Chair: Javad Emam
- Head: Mohammad Khatami
- Key people: Hassan Rasouli (Head of Board)
- Location: Tehran
- Website: bonyadbaran.com

Foundation for Freedom, Growth and Development of Iran (Persian: بنیاد آزادی، رشد و آبادانی ایران), backronymed BARAN Foundation (Persian: بنیاد باران, meaning Rain Foundation) is an Iranian not-for-profit non-governmental organization headed by Mohammad Khatami. It is one of two non-governmental organisations founded by Khatami after he left office, alongside the International Institute for Dialogue among Cultures and Civilizations; both reflect his advocacy of dialogue between civilisations, an idea he had put to the United Nations during his presidency. Almost all members of the foundation are reformists.

== Organisation and activities ==
In April 2008, Mahmoud Zamani Qomi, the official responsible for the foundation's regional affairs, said that Baran planned to open branches in most of Iran's provinces and regions within six months, and that the regulations governing provincial and regional offices had been approved. He described the foundation as a non-political body operating under its own charter in the cultural, artistic, and social fields, and said the provincial branches would bring together regional administrators in pursuit of the foundation's aims.

== Legal status and 2011 ban ==
In September 2010, a member of the Article 10 Commission, the government body that licenses political parties, stated that Baran was strictly a cultural organisation and was forbidden from any political activity.

On 27 January 2011 the Ministry of Interior declared the foundation an "illegal" entity whose activities were to be banned. Mahmoud Abbaszadeh Meshkini, head of the ministry's political branch, said that Baran had not completed the required licensing procedures and had been registered and granted a permit in haste, and accused the outgoing reformist government of hurriedly creating organisations to advance its agenda before the transfer of power. Radio Zamaneh presented the announcement as part of a wider series of government actions against Khatami, whom it described as one of the principal figures of the post-election protests. The same commission had dissolved two major reformist parties, the Islamic Iran Participation Front and the Mojahedin of the Islamic Revolution, during the preceding year.

== See also ==
- Omid Iranian Foundation
