= 2013 Iranian presidential election =

- 14 June 2013
- Turnout: 72.71% (▼12.51pp)
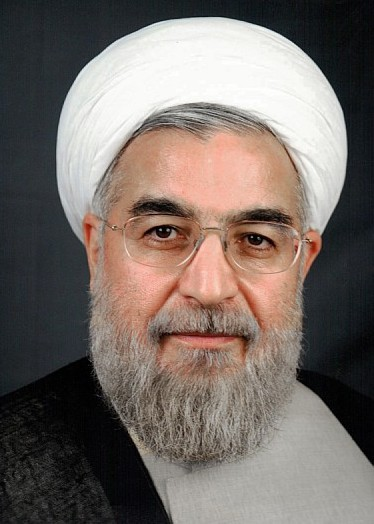

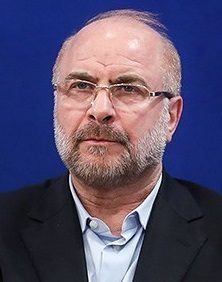

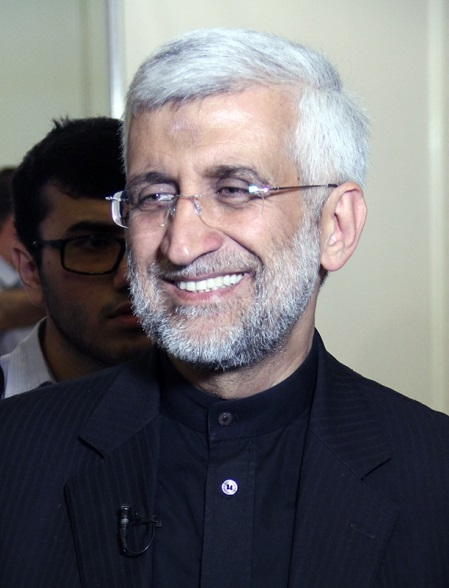

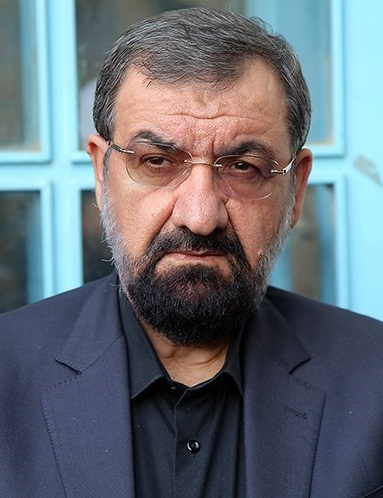

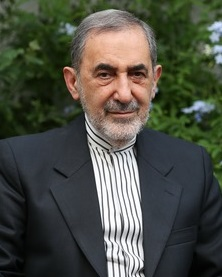
Nominee	Hassan Rouhani	Mohammad Bagher Ghalibaf	Saeed Jalili
Party	MDP	PJP	FIRS
Alliance	Reformists	Principlists	Principlists
Popular vote	18,613,329	6,077,292	4,168,946
Percentage	50.71%	16.56%	11.36%
Nominee	Mohsen Rezaee	Ali Akbar Velayati
Party	RFI	FFLIL
Alliance	Principlists	Principlists
Popular vote	3,884,412	2,268,753
Percentage	10.58%	6.18%
- Winning candidate by district Rouhani: violet; Ghalibaf: yellow; Jalili: red; Rezaee: blue
President before election
Mahmoud Ahmadinejad
ABII
Elected President
Hassan Rouhani
MDP

Presidential elections were held in Iran on 14 June 2013. Hassan Rouhani was elected in the first round with over 50% of the vote. Tehran mayor Mohammad Bagher Ghalibaf finished second with 17% of the vote. Voter turnout was 73%.

The Guardian Council screened 680 registered candidates, approving eight to run in the election; Mohammad Bagher Ghalibaf, Gholam-Ali Haddad-Adel, Ali Akbar Velayati, Saeed Jalili, Mohsen Rezaee, Mohammad Gharazi, Hassan Rouhani and Mohammad Reza Aref. Haddad-Adel and Aref later withdrew from the race in the days leading up to the election. Incumbent president Mahmoud Ahmadinejad was not able to run for re-election as he was limited to two terms or 8 years in office under the Iranian constitution.

== Electoral system ==
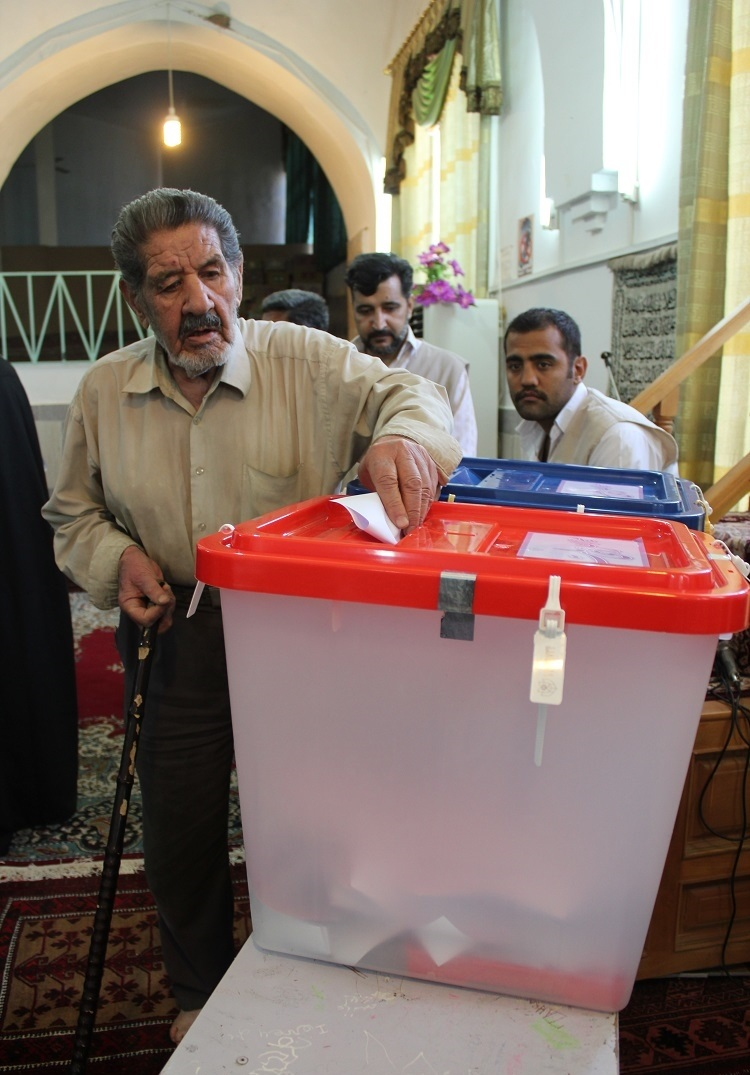
A man in Sarakhs casts his vote.

The president of Iran is the country's highest directly elected official, the chief of the executive branch, and the second most important position after the supreme leader. Duties are similar to heads of governments in other countries, except that the armed forces, Chief judiciary system, state television, and other key governmental organizations are under the control of the supreme leader. It is also an informal custom that cabinet ministers for sensitive departments like foreign relations and intelligence are coordinated with the Supreme Leader.

The president is elected using the two-round system. To win in the first round, a candidate must receive more than 50% of all votes cast (both valid and invalid).

Any Iranian citizen born in Iran, believing in God and the official religion of Iran (Islam), who has always been loyal to the Constitution and is above 21 years of age may register as a presidential candidate. An institution called the Election Monitoring Agency (EMA) and managed by the Guardian Council vets registered candidates (in the 2009 election 36,000 people signed up as candidates) and selects a handful to run in the election. The Guardian Council does not announce publicly the reason for rejections of particular candidates although those reasons are explained to each candidate. Females who register as candidates have invariably been excluded from standing for election by the council.

=== Electoral law ===
One of the issues that has been raised in the pre-election debate over electoral reforms, especially regarding enforcement, situations of candidates. Executive of elections under previous law was ministry of interior (Government) and there were statements about changing of maintaining law. In addition, the law provided that the candidates must be political men and the meaning of men was not known. The changes began after the protests to the previous election. According to Iranian law, candidates more than 75 years old are eligible to run but their health issues must be checked by the Guardian Council.

The new act of the elections was approved by the parliament on 17 December 2012 and was signified by speaker of the parliament, Ali Larijani, to the president for official implementation. Some of the changes are explained:

Act	Before	After (changed)
18 / 31	Ministry of Interior must announce the results; Ministry of Interior is the only official reference of the election.	Electoral Commission will announce the results after the Ministry of Interior confirmation*.; Ministry of Interior, under the Electoral Commission are the official references of the election.
64	Debates can be recorded.	Debates must be live.; If extortion about one candidate, he has the mandate to defend him/herself in next programs.

=== Timeline ===
- 7 May – The official registration of candidates began at the ministry of interior.
- 11 May – The time for registration was ended at 18:00 IRDT.
- 21 May – The final list of candidates was announced by the Minister of Interior, Mostafa Mohammad Najjar. A number of 8 candidates are eligible to participate in the election.
- 24 May – Official propagation campaigns for the final candidates began.
- 13 June – End of campaigns.
- 14 June – Election date.
- 15 June – Official results announced by Interior Ministry with Hassan Rouhani elected as the seventh President of Iran.
- 25 June – Guardian Council confirmed the election results.
- 1 August – President-elect met with Supreme Leader Ali Khamenei.
- 3 August – Inauguration of new president, replacing Mahmoud Ahmadinejad.

=== Electoral Commission ===
For the first time in the history of Iranian presidential elections, a commission of eleven persons (three legal, seven experts, and one from parliament) supervised the elections.

== Candidates ==
Registration for candidates took place from 7 to 11 May 2013. Registered candidates' qualifications were then reviewed by the Guardian Council. On 21 May 2013 eight candidates were approved for placement on the ballot. BBC News commented that all eight approved candidates were "considered hardline conservatives," with reformist candidates, notably former president Akbar Hashemi Rafsanjani, having been barred from standing. In contrast, Lebanon's Daily Star newspaper described attempts by former presidents Rafsanjani and Mohammad Khatami to unite behind one or the other of two "reformist candidates," Hassan Rouhani and Mohammad Reza Aref. Two of the eight, Aref and Gholam-Ali Haddad-Adel, withdrew from the race on 10 and 11 June.

Name	Party	Slogan	Political background
Mohammad Bagher Ghalibaf	Population For Progress and Justice	Change, Life, People; A glorious Iran	Ghalibaf has been Mayor of Tehran since 2005. During the Iran–Iraq War, he was chief commander of Iran's Imam Ridha troops in 1982 and of its Nasr Troops from 1983 to 1984. After the war he became managing director of Khatam al-Anbiya Construction Headquarters, an engineering firm controlled by the Iranian Revolutionary Guard Corps and also commander of the Islamic Republic of Iran Air Force, in 1996. In 2000, he became chief of the Iranian Police Forces. He was also a candidate in 2005 presidential election.
Mohammad Gharazi	Independent	Government against Inflation	Gharazi was Minister of Petroleum from 1981 to 1985 and Minister of Posts from 1985 to 1997. He was a member of the Iran's Parliament from 1980 to 1984 and governor of Khuzestan from 1979 to 1980.
Saeed Jalili	Front of Islamic Revolution Stability	Hayat-e-Taiba	Since 2007 Jalili has been Secretary of the Supreme National Security Council and therefore Iran's chief nuclear negotiator. He was previously Deputy Minister of Foreign Affairs from 2005 to 2007.
Mohsen Rezaee	Resistance Front of Islamic Iran	Say hello to life	Rezaee has been Secretary of the Expediency Discernment Council since 1997. From 1981 to 1997 he was chief commander of the Iranian Revolutionary Guard Corps. He has run for the presidency twice, in 2005 and 2009.
Hassan Rouhani	Moderation and Development Party (Endorsed by Council for Coordinating the Reforms Front)	Government of Prudence and Hope	Rouhani has been a member of the Assembly of Experts since 1999, head of the Center for Strategic Research since 1992, and a member of the Expediency Discernment Council since 1991. He has also served on the Supreme National Security Council since 1989; he was secretary of the council and therefore Iran's chief nuclear negotiator from 1989 to 2005. Rouhani was a member of Iran's parliament from 1980 to 2000, also serving as Deputy Speaker of the parliament from 1992 to 2000.
Ali Akbar Velayati	Front of Followers of the Line of the Imam and the Leader (Endorsed by Society of Seminary)	Complementarity Government	Velayati was Minister of Foreign Affairs from 1981 to 1997 and Deputy Minister of Health from 1980 to 1981. He was a member of the Parliament from 1980 to 1981.

=== Withdrawn ===
==== During the electoral campaign ====
The following two candidates registered for the election and their nominations were approved by the Guardian Council, but withdrew their candidacies during the electoral campaign.

- Mohammad Reza Aref, First Vice President (2001–2005) (endorsed Hassan Rouhani).
- Gholam-Ali Haddad-Adel, Speaker of the Parliament (2004–2008) (endorsed Conservative candidates; Progression Alliance).

Name	Party	Slogan	Political background	Endorsed
Mohammad-Reza Aref (campaign)	Omid Iranian Foundation	Livelihoods, decent and honest life with dignity and rationality	Aref was First Vice President of Iran from 2001 to 2005 in the second term of Mohammad Khatami. Livelihoods, decent and honest life with dignity and rationality. He previously served as Minister Information and Communications Technology and head of Management and Planning Organization in Khatami's first cabinet.He is also an electrical engineer and a professor at University of Tehran and Sharif University of Technology. He withdrew his candidacy on 11 June in order to give the reformist camp a better chance to win.	Hassan Rouhani
Gholam-Ali Haddad-Adel (campaign)	Society of Devotees of the Islamic Revolution	None	Haddad-Adel, an Iranian parliamentarian who chaired it from 2004 to 2008 was one of Progression Alliance candidates. He was also president of Academy of Persian Language and Literature. He withdrew on 10 June in favor of a principlist candidate.	Principlist candidates

==== Before the electoral campaign ====
The following candidates registered for the election campaign but withdrew their candidacies before the electoral campaign.

- Masoud Pezeshkian, Member of the Parliament (since 2008) (endorsed Akbar Hashemi Rafsanjani)
- Javad Etaat, Member of the Parliament (2000–2004) (endorsed Akbar Hashemi Rafsanjani)
- Ali Akbar Javanfekr, managing director of IRNA (2010–2013) (endorsed Esfandiar Rahim Mashaei)
- Mohammad-Reza Rahimi, First Vice President (2009–2013) (endorsed Esfandiar Rahim Mashaei)
- Ramin Mehmanparast, Deputy Minister of Foreign Affairs (2010–2013) (endorsed Mohammad Bagher Ghalibaf)
- Mohammad-Hassan Aboutorabi Fard, Deputy Speaker of the Parliament (2010–2011) (endorsed Manouchehr Mottaki)
- Sadeq Khalilian, Minister of Agricultural (2009–2013) (endorsed Esfandiar Rahim Mashaei)
- Mohammad Shariatmadari, Minister of Commerce (1997–2005) (endorsed Akbar Hashemi Rafsanjani)
- Davoud Ahmadinejad, Head of Presidential Commission (2005–2008) (endorsed Ali Akbar Velayati)
- Kamran Bagheri Lankarani, Minister of Health (2005–2009) (endorsed Saeed Jalili)
- Sadeq Vaeez Zadeh, Head of National Elites Foundation (2006–2009) (endorsed Mohammad Bagher Ghalibaf)
- Alireza Ali Ahmadi, Minister of Education (2006–2009) (endorsed Mohammad Bagher Ghalibaf)

=== Rejected ===
The following candidates registered for the election but their nominations were rejected by the Guardian Council. All thirty registered female candidates were promptly disqualified on constitutional grounds.

- Esfandiar Rahim Mashaei, Chief Staff of the President (2009–2012)
- Manouchehr Mottaki, Minister of Foreign Affairs (2005–2010)
- Ruhollah Ahmadzadeh, Head of Cultural Heritage Organization (2011–2012)
- Ali Fallahian, Minister of Intelligence (1989–1997)
- Parviz Kazemi, Minister of Welfare and Social Security (2005–2006)
- Abulhassan Navab, Chancellor of University of Religions and Denominations (since 1995)
- Alireza Zakani, Member of the Parliament (since 2004)
- Mohammad Saeedikia, Minister of Housing and Urban Development (2005–2009)
- Mohammed Bagher Kharrazi, Academic
- Ahmad Kashani, Member of the Parliament (1980–1988)
- Akbar Hashemi Rafsanjani, President (1989–1997)
- Tahmasb Mazaheri, Governor of Central Bank (2007–2008)
- Mostafa Kavakebian, Member of the Parliament (2004–2012)
- Ebrahim Asgharzadeh, Member of the Parliament (1988–1992)
- Akbar A'lami, Member of the Parliament (2000–2008)
- Elias Hazrati, Member of the Parliament (1988–2004)
- Ghasem Sholeh-Saadi, Member of the Parliament (1996–2008)
- Hassan Sobhani, Member of the Parliament (1996–2008)
- Hooshang Amirahmadi, Academic and political analyst

=== Declined ===
The following people did not register for the election and declined to enter the race.

- Mohammad-Ali Najafi, Minister of Education (1989–1997)
- Parviz Fattah, Minister of Energy (2005–2009)
- Mostafa Pourmohammadi, Minister of Interior (2005–2008)
- Mohammad-Reza Bahonar, Deputy Speaker of the Parliament (since 2011)
- Ali Larijani, Speaker of the Parliament (since 2008)
- Mehdi Chamran, Chairman of City Council of Tehran (since 2003)
- Mohammad Khatami, President (1997–2005)
- Gholam-Hossein Elham, Minister of Justice (2006–2009)
- Eshaq Jahangiri, Minister of Mines (1997–2005)
- Mohsen Mehralizadeh, Head of the National Sports Organization (2000–2005)
- Ali Akbar Salehi, Minister of Foreign Affairs (since 2010)
- Ali Nikzad, Minister of Transportation (since 2011)
- Bijan Namdar Zangeneh, Minister of Petroleum (1997–2005)
- Hamid Baqai, Head of Presidential Center (since 2011)
- Yahya Ale Eshaq, Minister of Commerce (1993–1997)
- Hossein Kamali, Minister of Labor (1988–1997)

== Endorsements ==
While Rouhani is a high-ranking member of the Combatant Clergy Association, his candidacy in the election was not supported by CCA which has conservative tendency. He was supported by some moderate and reformist parties such as Moderation and Development Party and Islamic Iran Participation Front as well as Iranian reform movement's umbrella organization, Council for coordinating the Reforms Front. Rouhani's motto in the election is "E'tedal" which is translated to "Moderation" and he is described as a moderate politician by some western sources.

- 19 October 2012 – 7 April 2013: 'Progress and Justice Population of Islamic Iran' selected three main conservative candidates as their nominates: Ghalibaf, Velayati and Haddad-Adel. Two of them will withdraw in favor of one.
- 20–22 November 2012: House of Labour, Kamali won the nomination with no opponent. Kamali withdrew on 10 May 2013 and party supports Rouhani.
- 10–15 January 2013: Democracy Party, Kavakebian won the nomination. Kavakebian's nomination was later rejected and party supports Rouhani.
- 19–20 April 2013: Front of Islamic Revolution Stability, Bagheri Lankarani was elected as the coalition's main candidate. Lankarani withdrew five days after registered and coalition supports Jalili.
- 5–9 May 2013: 'Conservatives Majority Alliance', Aboutorabi Fard won the coalition's vote but Mottaki declared he will not accept this selection and will run separately. After Aboutorabi Fard's withdrew and Mottaki's rejection, party supports Ghalibaf.
- 11 May 2013: Executives of Construction Party, the party's mental leader Rafsanjani was registered but after Rafsanjani's rejection, party supports Rouhani.
- 28 May 2013: Velayati, one of the three candidates of Progression Alliance, announced that all three candidates will be remain at the race but Haddad-Adel was withdrew on 10 June.

== Campaign ==
=== Debates ===
From 25 May to 12 June 2013, each of the eight final candidates has the right to use National TV and Radio (IRIB) for their presidential election campaigns. In total, each candidate will use 405 minutes on Public TV and 285 minutes on Public Radio. This time comprises the candidates' own campaign programs as well as participation in the specific discussion shows. In addition, there will be three main live group debates on TV. The debates are held in three chapters: the first was held on 31 May, and second on 5 May and third on 7 May between all eight candidates. They differed from the previous election debates, which were held person-by-person. The 2013 debates and TV shows are moderated by Morteza Heidari and Hassan Abedini.

The following table shows the programme details and the time schedule for each candidate in Iranian Public TV. The times given are the local time (UTC +4:30 IRDT).

Program title	Channel & Time	Repetition time	25 May Sat	26 May Sun	27 May Mon	28 May Tue	29 May Wed	30 May Thu	31 May Fri	1 June Sat	2 June Sun	
With Camera	IRIB1, 20:00–20:30	—	Rezaee	Jalili	Velayati	Rouhani	Ghalibaf	Haddad		Aref	Gharazi	
Special talk	IRIB2, 22:45–23:30	—	Jalili	Velayati	Rouhani	Ghalibaf	Aref	Rezaee		Gharazi	Haddad	
Reply Iranian abroad	JJ1, 23:30–00:30	—	Gharazi	Aref ^{1}	Haddad	Jalili	Velayati	Rouhani	Aref	Ghalibaf	Rezaee	
Debate 1	IRIB1, 16:00–19:30	IRIB4, 21:00–00:30							All			
Program title	Channel & Time	Repetition time	3 June Mon	4 June Tue	5 June Wed	6 June Thu	7 June Fri	8 June Sat	9 June Sun	10 June Mon	11 June Tue	12 June Wed
Reply the experts	IRIB4, 18:10–19:10	—	Gharazi	Haddad		Rouhani		Jalili	Ghalibaf	Aref	Rezaee	Velayati
Reply the youth	IRIB3, 19:10–20:10	—	Aref	Ghalibaf		Velayati		Rezaee	Haddad	Gharazi	Jalili	Rouhani
Documentary 1–2	IRIB1, 20:10–20:40	JJ1, 23:30–24:00	Rezaee	Velayati		Ghalibaf		Aref	Jalili	Rouhani	Haddad ^{2}	Gharazi
The talk	IRINN, 22:30–23:00	—	Rouhani	Jalili		Gharazi		Haddad	Velayati	Rezaee	Aref ^{2}	Ghalibaf
Documentary 1–2	IRIB1, 23:30–24:00	JJ1, 00:30–01:00	Jalili	Rouhani		Haddad		Gharazi	Rezaee	Velayati	Ghalibaf	Aref ^{2}
Debate 2–3	IRIB1, 16:00–19:30	IRIB4, 21:00–00:30			All		All					

^{1} The first one-hour TV program of Mohammad-Reza Aref was cut after 15 minutes and did not continue. Later, the program was completely shown again on Friday, 31 May 2013.
^{2} Haddad and Aref's programs were not shown because they withdrew.

=== State limits on the campaign ===
On 9 June Brigadier General Seyyed Masoud Jazayeri, Deputy Chief of Joint Armed Forces Headquarters and head of the Defense Propaganda Headquarters, "warned" a "few of the candidates" that "we have warned before that it's better that candidates express their opinions within the framework of presidency's authority, and avoid entering in those issues related to security or the armed forces." Jazayeri added that the Pasdaran will confront those candidates "who have spread untrue information and painted a black picture [of the regime], after the election."

According to the Campaign for Human Rights in Iran, Jazayeri was "alluding to the two reformist candidates in the race, Mohammad Reza Aref and Hassan Rouhani". (Aref withdrew from the race 11 June)

Also according to the Campaign, "several political activists and campaign workers have been arrested at political rallies, at their work places, and at their homes" since the beginning of June. In addition, "journalists and activists who had been imprisoned after the 2009 elections" and were later released on furlough "have been recalled to prison in the month leading to the election"

In the run-up to the election, the internet was drastically slowed down with poor connectivity and since March virtual private networks have been blocked, resulting in the inability of Iranians to access thousands of foreign websites, as well as Twitter and Facebook.

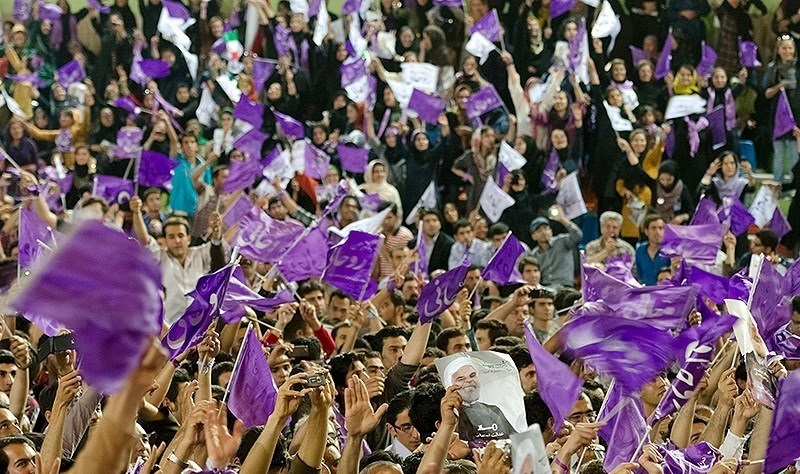
Supporters of Hassan Rouhani rally

== Opinion polls ==
The main online polls began after announcement of candidates' final list. The polls are divided into three main groups: field polls, telephone polls and internet polls.

=== IPOS polls ===
As one of the few telephone polling systems in Iran, IPOS (Iranian Elections Tracking Polls) institute ran a daily poll system for the election, by claiming that they have the only official poll system in Iranian presidential election. The poll is based on the daily phone interviews with a sample size of around 1,000 people per day. The poll also reported that between 60 and 75% of the people confirmed they will participate in the presidential election.

On 6 June 2013 Ghalibaf held a strong lead in the poll with the support of 39% of decided voters. However, the poll notified that 57% of voters are undecided, meaning that the poll result can be changed easily. Rezaee and Jalili had the second and third place with 16.8 and 13.9% of decided voters respectively.

On 10 June 2013 Ghalibaf still held a lead in the presidential race, but this time with the support of 27% of decided voters. Ghalibaf votes has started to decrease after the third national TV debate held on 7 June 2013. The percentage of undecided voters decreased to 47%. Jalili and Rezaee had the second and third place with 16.5 and 16% of decided voters respectively. Rouhani's votes started to increase after the third national TV debate reaching from 8 to 14%. After Aref's withdrawal on 11 June 2013 and decreasing the undecided voters percentage, some significant changes in the percentages are expected in the following days.

On 12 June 2013 Rouhani made a notable lead in the presidential race, reaching 32% of decided votes. Ghalibaf votes has continued to decrease to 24.4% of decided voters. The percentage of undecided voters decreased to 42%. Jalili, Rezaee and Velayati had the third to fifth place with a rally small margin of difference.

On 13 June 2013 in the final results, Rouhani reached 38% of decided votes. Ghalibaf votes remained on 25% of decided voters. The percentage of undecided voters decreased to 38.7%. Rezaee, Jalili and Velayati were in third to fifth place.

Poll source	Date	Total votes	Jalili	Haddad	Rezaee	Rouhani	Aref	Gharazi	Ghalibaf	Velayati	decided votes (%)
IPOS	3–6 June 2013	1,067	13.9%	4.4%	16.8%	8.1%	5.8%	0.7%	39.0%	11.5%	42.9%
IPOS	5–8 June 2013	1,067	14.8%▲	4.5% ▲	16.4% ▼	9.6%▲	6.8% ▲	2.6% ▲	34.1% ▼	11.3% ▼	44.9%
IPOS	7–10 June 2013	1,067	16.5%▲	3.5% ▼	16.0% ▼	14.4% ▲	8.4% ▲	2.7% ▲	27.1% ▼	11.4% ▲	53.1%
IPOS	8–11 June 2013	1,067	13.7%▼	1.3% ▼	16.3% ▲	26.6%▲	5.1% ▼	1.5% ▼	24.8% ▼	10.4% ▼	57.6%
IPOS	9–12 June 2013	1,067	13.7%	0.6% ▼	14.3% ▼	31.7% ▲	1.6% ▼	1.4% ▼	24.4% ▼	12.7% ▲	57.8%
IPOS	10–13 June 2013	1,067	12.6%▼	—N/a	13.7% ▼	38% ▲	—N/a	1.4%	24.6% ▲	9.7% ▼	61.3%

== Results ==
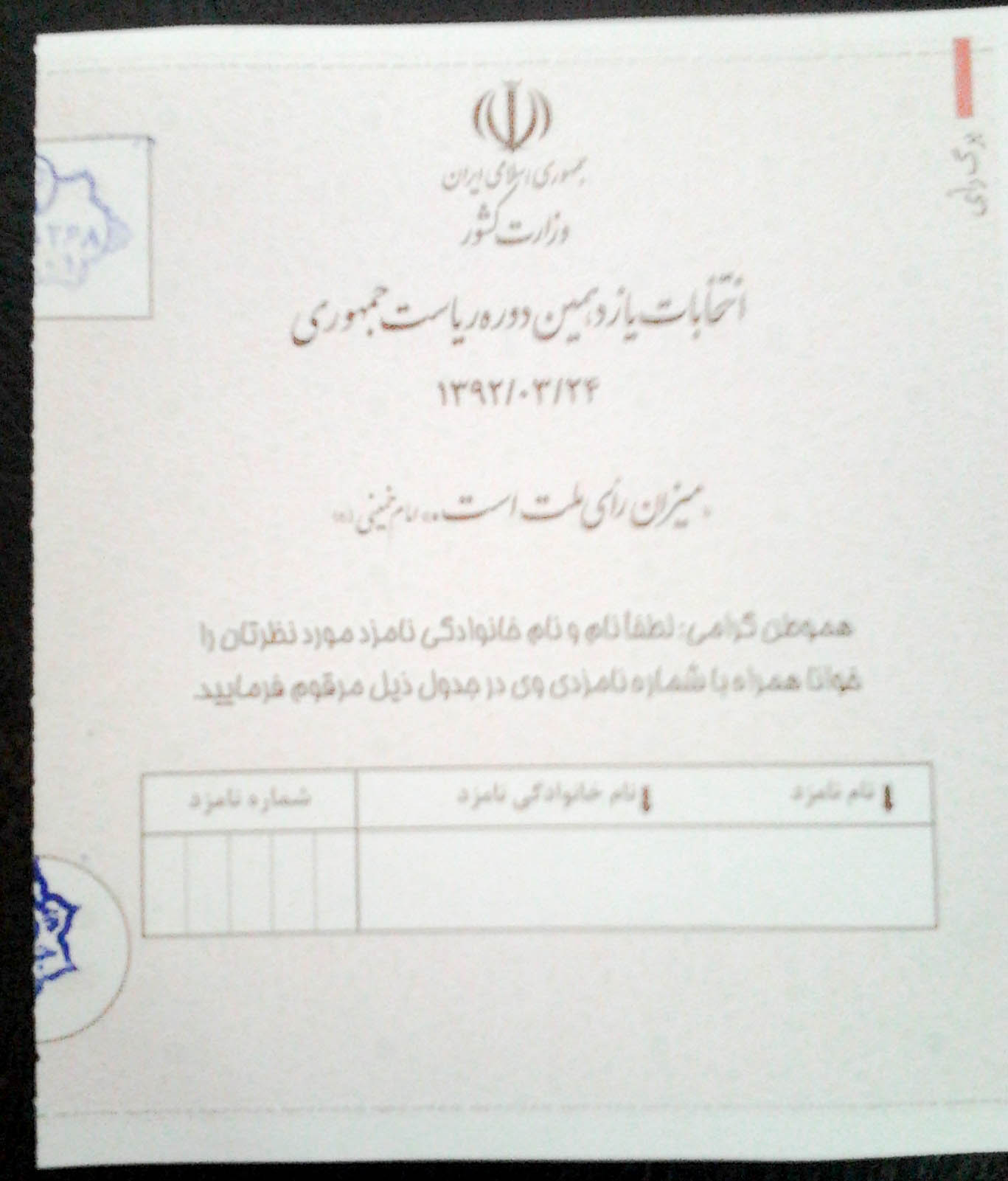
Ballot which was used in the election

According to the Ministry of Interior, 50,483,192 were eligible to vote in the first round. Over 66,000 polling stations were set up across the country. Expatriates were able to vote in 285 polling stations set-up in their respective countries. Due to its massive population, Tehran province had the highest number of polling stations with over 17,000.

Rouhani narrowly avoided a second round, receiving 50.71% of all votes cast. At 20:30 the ministry announced Rouhani as the new president.

Candidate	Party	Votes	%
Hassan Rouhani	Moderation and Development Party	18,613,329	52.49
Mohammad Bagher Ghalibaf	Progress and Justice Population	6,077,292	17.14
Saeed Jalili	Front of Islamic Revolution Stability	4,168,946	11.76
Mohsen Rezaee	Resistance Front of Islamic Iran	3,884,412	10.95
Ali Akbar Velayati	Front of Followers of the Line of the Imam and the Leader	2,268,753	6.40
Mohammad Gharazi	Independent	446,015	1.26
Total		35,458,747	100.00
Valid votes		35,458,747	96.61
Invalid/blank votes		1,245,409	3.39
Total votes		36,704,156	100.00
Registered voters/turnout		50,483,192	72.71
Source: Ministry of Interior

=== By province ===
The table below displays the official vote tallies by province.

Provinces/districts won by Rouhani
Provinces/districts won by Rezaee

Province	Rouhani	Ghalibaf	Jalili	Rezaee	Velayati	Gharazi	Source
Alborz	519,412	213,904	105,372	84,633	77,354	12,226	
Ardabil	384,747	98,294	44,441	59,524	40,531	8,386	
Azerbaijan, East	1,052,187	187,541	187,708	201,852	164,248	24,974	
Azerbaijan, West	995,675	151,508	93,787	105,685	67,874	15,548	
Bushehr	278,762	64,882	54,960	74,178	38,542	6,712	
Chahar Mahaal and Bakhtiari	155,884	43,201	38,600	211,101	21,693	4,034	
Fars	1,292,943	247,642	309,929	211,801	135,425	23,343	
Gilan	784,420	213,575	149,968	86,687	85,174	18,531	
Golestan	546,132	158,668	78,863	46,125	74,400	10,399	
Hamedan	451,810	139,835	138,414	80,340	69,770	11,378	
Hormozgan	414,444	69,277	122,954	64,270	48,743	11,356	
Ilam	170,712	34,697	22,266	56,669	14,805	3,798	
Isfahan	1,017,516	259,601	411,098	270,799	203,679	59,106	
Kerman	856,001	222,529	215,605	69,082	64,215	14,104	
Kermanshah	545,762	153,388	61,745	100,643	39,673	8,317	
Khorasan, North	226,026	158,177	52,871	18,902	17,957	5,691	
Khorasan, Razavi	498,002	442,071	222,971	53,915	74,781	16,193	
Khorasan, South	192,446	101,713	103,382	14,582	15,185	5,053	
Khuzestan	675,492	117,977	196,446	921,570	78,488	15,251	
Kohgiluyeh and Boyer-Ahmad	128,108	17,886	24,629	144,809	11,696	1,343	
Kurdistan	438,294	75,456	49,696	30,999	17,963	7,045	
Lorestan	410,700	100,394	63,833	237,952	41,368	6,621	
Markazi	331,892	48,756	32,607	24,095	29,039	3,751	
Mazandaran	1,080,727	282,862	178,318	92,518	159,060	20,673	
Qazvin	324,739	136,343	90,573	45,884	47,174	8,108	
Qom	201,677	89,987	121,237	30,540	68,356	9,364	
Semnan	157,133	87,598	55,987	14,541	26,499	5,051	
Sistan and Baluchestan	770,269	109,572	64,548	61,959	35,874	9,018	
Tehran	2,385,890	1,266,568	336,557	550,348	316,592	61,893	
Yazd	343,361	52,047	61,575	19,368	27,024	5,058	
Zanjan	270,440	100,729	66,612	45,923	40,363	9,156	

=== Turnout ===
Officials said over 72 percent of over 50 million eligible Iranians turned out to vote.

=== Reactions ===
Prior to the election, the Foreign Ministry's spokesperson, Abbas Araghchi accused France and the United States of interfering in the electoral process after the two countries' officials criticised the nomination process and the disqualifications. Hours after the announcement of preliminary results, Ali Akbar Velayati and Mohammad Gharazi both conceded their loss in the election and congratulated the president-elect. Mohammad Reza Aref, the withdrawing candidate also published via his Twitter account, congratulating the new president and thanked people for voting for the reform movement. Hassan Rouhani, Mohammad Bagher Ghalibaf and Mohsen Rezaee's campaigns also thanked the nation on their high participation in the election. Tehran Stock Exchange's index also reached more than 46,000 units that was highest since February 2013. Supreme Leader, Ali Khamenei also congratulated Rouhani on his election as new president of the country.

Country	Reaction
Afghanistan	President Hamid Karzai congratulated the democratic election to the government and people of Iran. He also congratulated Rouhani after his victory announcement.
Armenia	President Serzh Sargsyan congratulated Hassan Rouhani on winning Iran's presidential election and expressed confidence that Armenian-Iranian relations will grow even closer during his tenure.
Azerbaijan	President Ilham Aliyev sent a message to Iran's President-elect Hassan Rouhani to felicitate him on his victory in Iran's presidential election. Foreign Ministry Spokesman Elman Abdullayev also expressed Baku's willingness to further expand its bilateral ties with Tehran during the tenure of Iran's President-elect Hassan Rouhani.
Bahrain	King Hamad bin Isa Al Khalifa congratulated Rouhani for his election as Iranian president on 14 June's election.
Brazil	President Dilma Rousseff congratulated Rouhani for his election as Iranian president and also invited him to a state visit of the country and also her visit of Iran.
Canada	Foreign minister John Baird said with some negativity "With Iran's opposition leaders in jail and their supporters having been denied the ability to co-ordinate since June 2009, none of the eight regime-approved candidates represents a real alternative for Iranian voters." and added whoever being elected "will simply be another of Ayatollah Khamenei's puppets in the tragic and dangerous pantomime that is life for all Iranians. Given the regime's manipulation of the collective will and democratic process, the results of the June 14 vote are effectively meaningless." Baird later published a statement, apologized for his comments and called Iran's election democratic.
China	Foreign Ministry spokeswoman Hua Chunying congratulated Rouhani on his election as Iranian president during a press conference.
Egypt	Foreign minister Mohamed Kamel Amr hailed the presidential election in Iran as successful, and offered his felicitations on President-elect Hassan Rouhani's victory in a phone conversation with his Iranian counterpart Ali Akbar Salehi.
European Union	Former High Representative for the Common Foreign and Security Policy, Javier Solana said: "Due to the upcoming elections, the leaders of Iran will focus on it more than nuclear talks and it would be on the sidelines. It was not until the election will be a very difficult task in the field of nuclear advance." Catherine Ashton also congratulated Rouhani on his election.
France	President François Hollande welcomed the election results and also invited Rouhani for participating in the upcoming Geneva meeting over the Syrian civil war and also invited him to Élysée Palace. Foreign Ministry also congratulated Rouhani for his election as president.
India	Prime Minister Manmohan Singh congratulated President-elect Rouhani on his victory in Iran's presidential election. Foreign minister Salman Khurshid also termed Rouhani's victory as a good signal and said it indicates much greater convergence and consensus amongst people and public opinion in Iran. He called it a welcome sign and an outcome of Iranian democracy.
Iraq	Vice President Khodair al-Khozaei congratulated Hassan Rouhani on his victory in Iran's 11th presidential election. Prime Minister Nouri al-Maliki also congratulated Rouhani.
Israel	Prime Minister Benjamin Netanyahu did not send a congratulation message to Rouhani, and said Iran's policies will never change.
Italy	President Giorgio Napolitano congratulated Rouhani over his election victory and said efforts should be made to strengthen Iran-Italy relations. Foreign Minister Emma Bonino also congratulated Rouhani in an official statement published by the Ministry of Foreign Affairs.
Jordan	King Abdullah II congratulated Rouhani for his election as President of Iran.
South Korea	Foreign Ministry congratulated Rouhani on winning Iran's presidential election, expressing hope for the improvement of relations between the two nations.
Kuwait	Emir Sabah Al-Ahmad Al-Jaber Al-Sabah published a statement, congratulated Rouhani for his election as Iran's next president and hoped Rouhani's visit of the country.
Lebanon	President Michel Suleiman also congratulated Iranian President-elect Rouhani on his election victory in a statement from Suleiman's office said. Leader of Hezbollah, Hassan Nasrullah has congratulated Leader of the Islamic Revolution Ali Khamenei and the Iranian nation on the huge turnout in the presidential and city and village council elections.
(Organisation of Islamic Cooperation) OIC	Secretary General Ekmeleddin Ihsanoglu congratulated Rouhani on his victory in the presidential poll and wished him success. He also expressed optimism that ties between Iran and the 57-member organization.
Pakistan	Prime Minister Nawaz Sharif extended his congratulations to Rouhani and Iranians in his congratulatory message.
Palestine	President Mahmoud Abbas congratulated Rouhani and wished him luck and success in fulfilling his duties.
Qatar	Emir Hamad bin Khalifa Al Thani and Prime Minister Hamad bin Jassim bin Jaber Al Thani both congratulated Rouhani.
Russia	Russian President, Vladimir Putin, congratulated Hassan Rouhani with his election as Iran's new president and confirmed Russia's readiness to develop bilateral cooperation.
Saudi Arabia	King Abdullah sent a congratulatory message to Rouhani, wishing him and the Iranian nation success and prosperity.
Syria	President Bashar al-Assad congratulated elected Iranian President Hassan Rouhani and expressed, on behalf of the Syrian people and on his own behalf.
Tajikistan	President Emomali Rahmon congratulated Hassan Rouhani over his victory in Iran's presidential election. Rahmon also wished the president-elect success.
Tunisia	President Moncef Marzouki extended his congratulations to the Iranian president-elect, wishing the Iranian nation glory and further progress.
Turkey	Foreign Minister Ahmet Davutoğlu congratulated Rouhani and wished the best for him and Iranian nation.
United Kingdom	In a statement published by Foreign and Commonwealth Office, United Kingdom welcomed the election of Rouhani but did not congratulate him.
United Nations	Secretary-general Ban Ki-moon congratulated Hasan Rouhani on his election as the next President of Iran, and commended the country's high turnout to the polls.
United States	The Secretary of Defense Chuck Hagel, hoped that the elections in Iran would lead to positive talks regarding the country's nuclear program. After Rouhani's victory, White House congratulated Iranians for their "courage" after moderate candidate Hassan Rouhani was elected president of Iran. Meanwhile, President Barack Obama said that the election is a sign of change to Iranians.
Venezuela	President Nicolás Maduro congratulated Rouhani's victory in the election and wishes an early visit of him and Iran.

=== Inauguration ===
The inauguration of Hassan Rouhani as the 7th President of Iran took place on two rounds, first on Saturday 3 August 2013 whereby he received his presidential precept from Supreme Leader and entered to the Sa'dabad Palace, official residence of the president in a private ceremony. The second was on the next day with sworn in for the office in the Parliament of Iran.

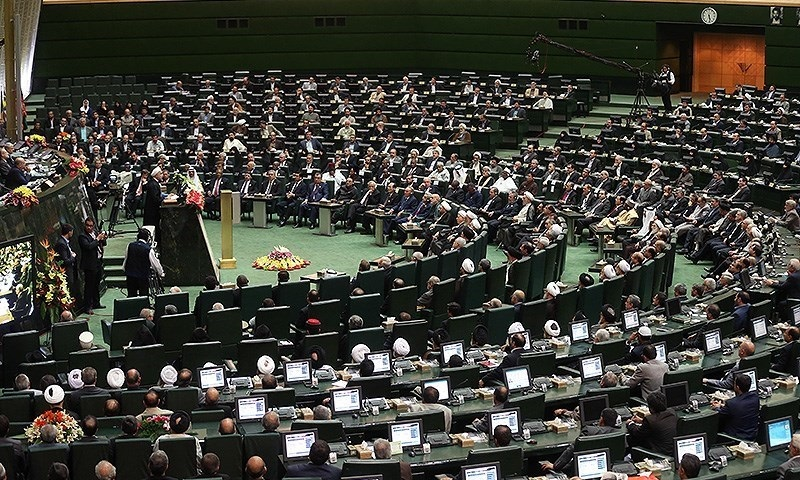
Hassan Rouhani inauguration

== Maps ==
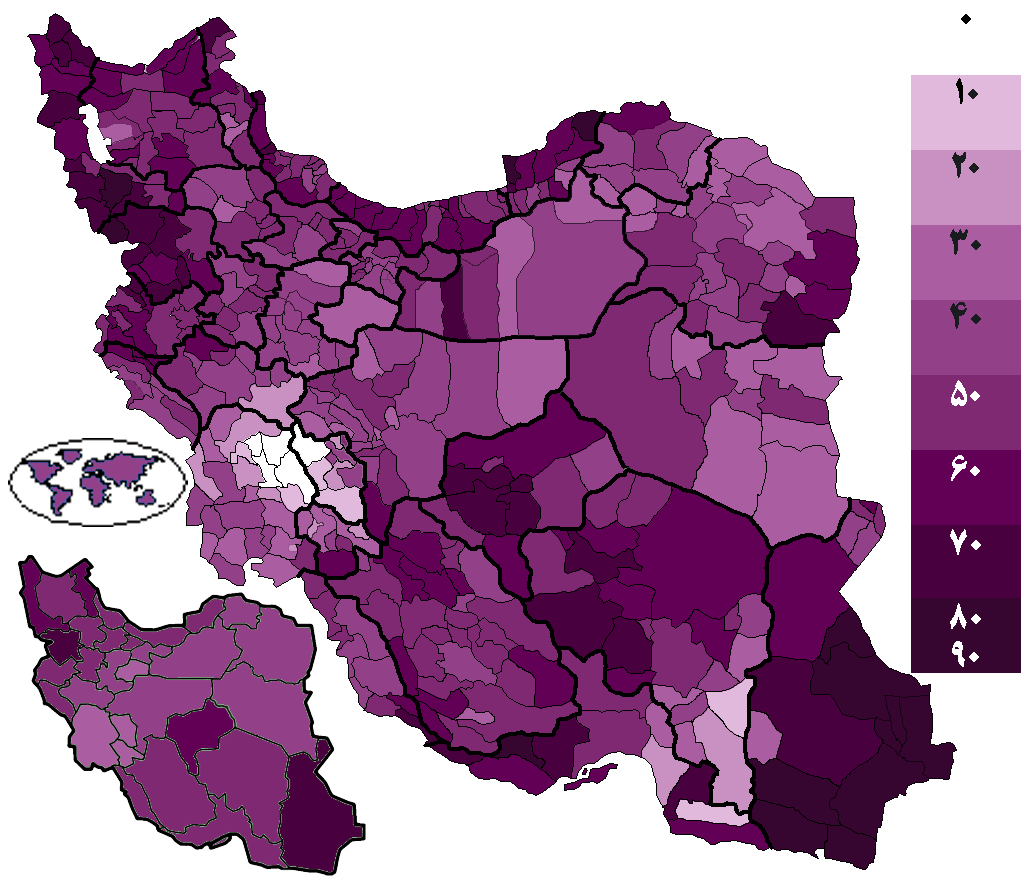
Votes received by Rouhani per districts

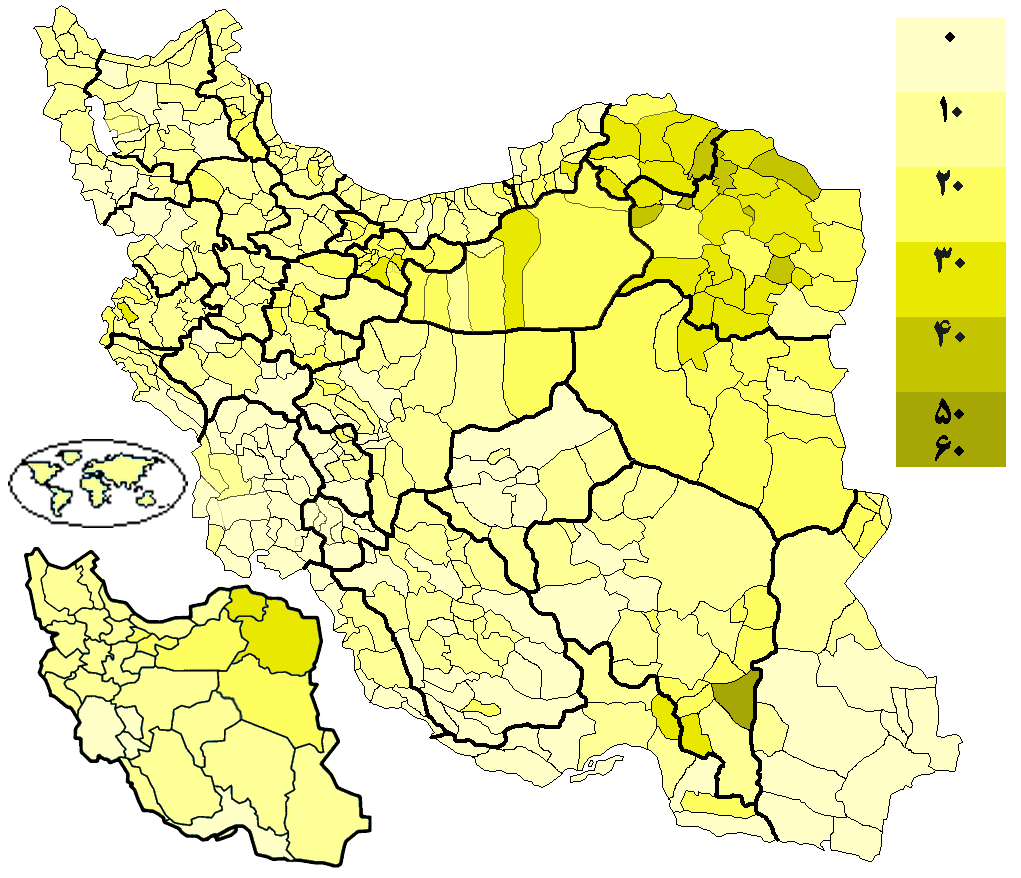
Votes received by Ghalibaf per districts

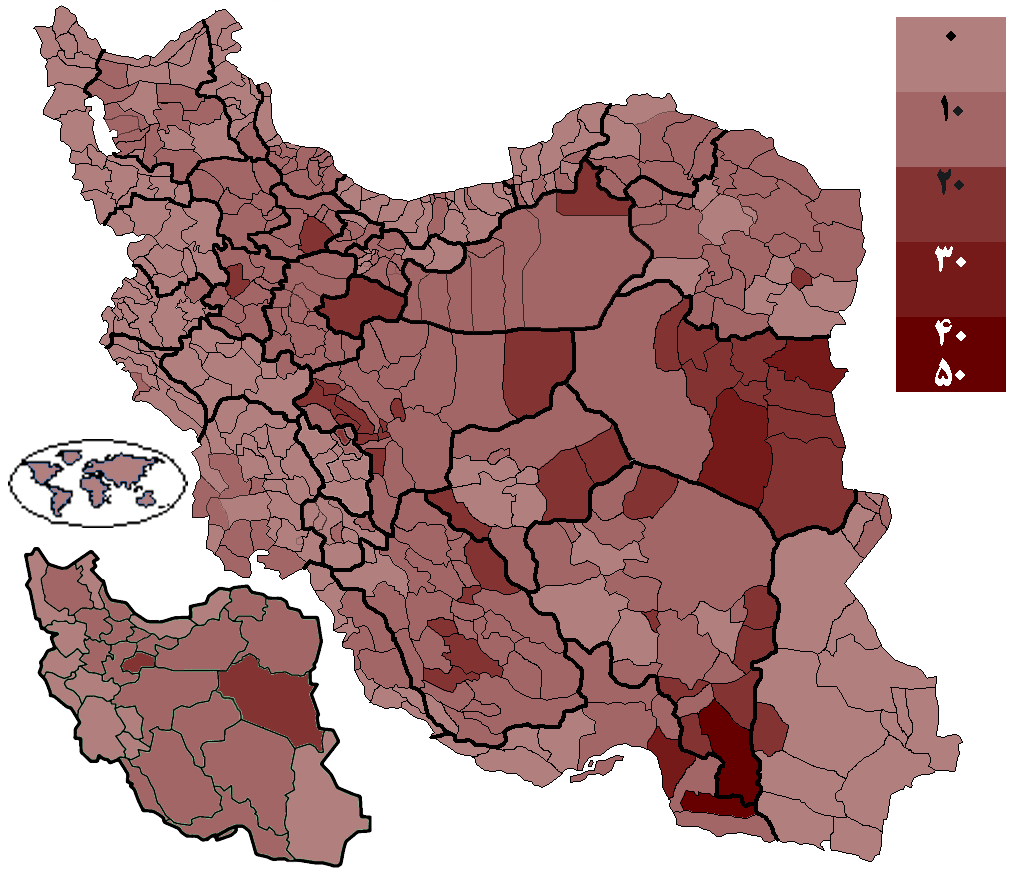
Votes received by Jalili per districts

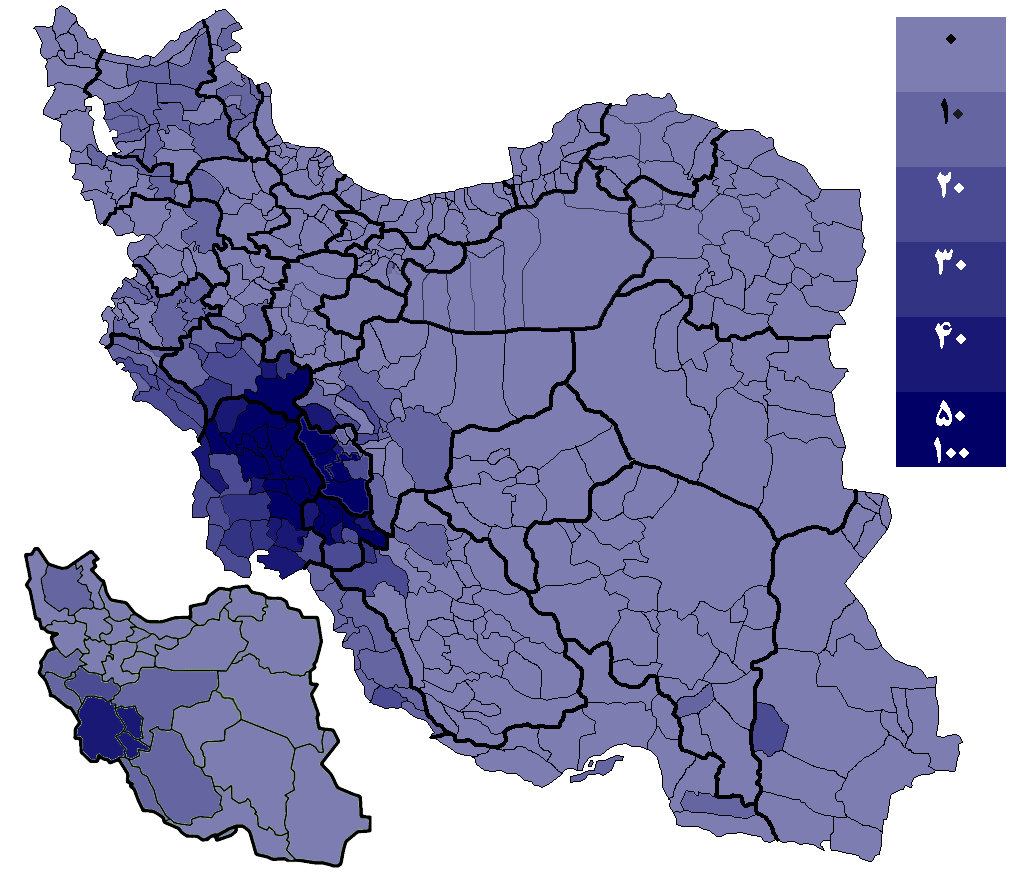
Votes received by Rezaee per districts

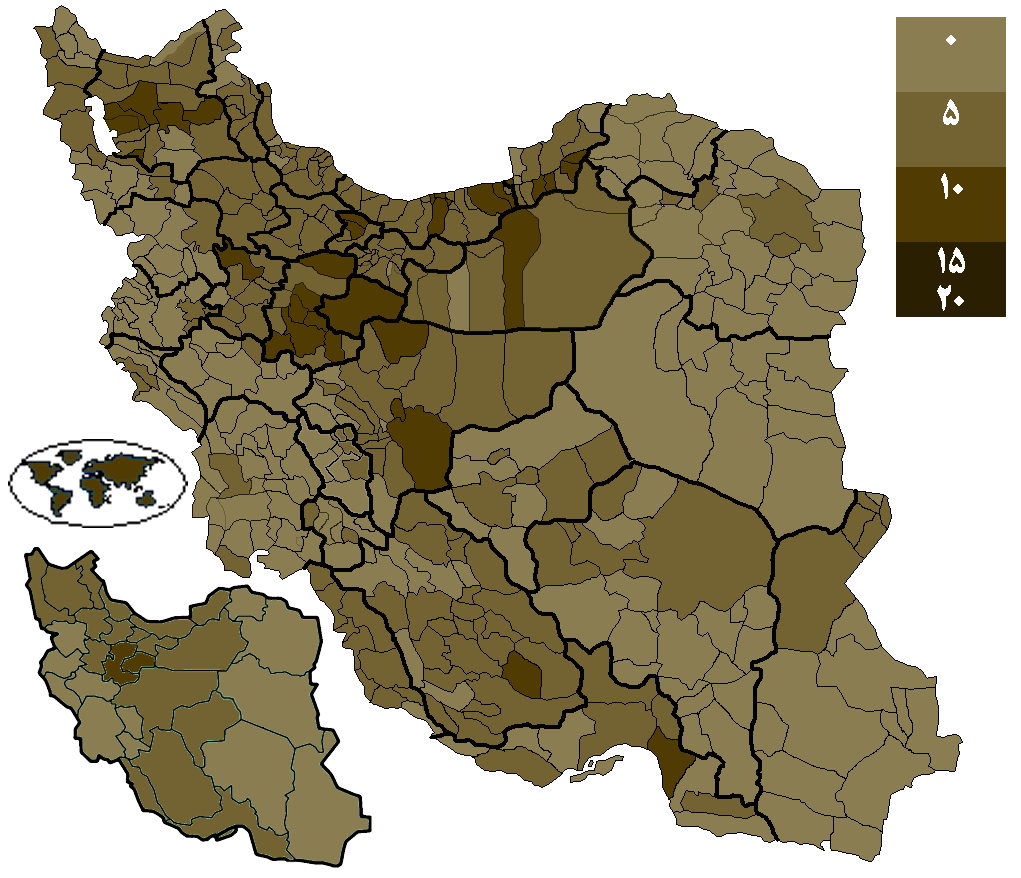
Votes received by Velayati per districts

== Gallery ==
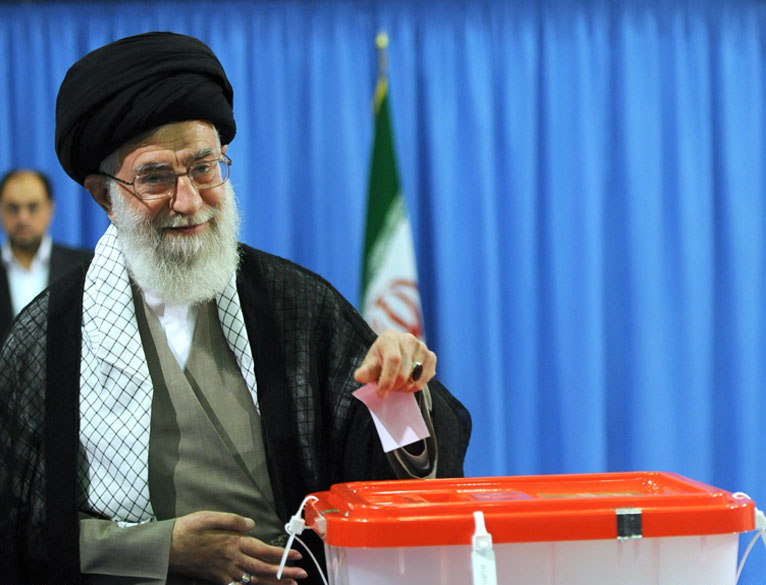
Supreme leader of Iran casts his vote

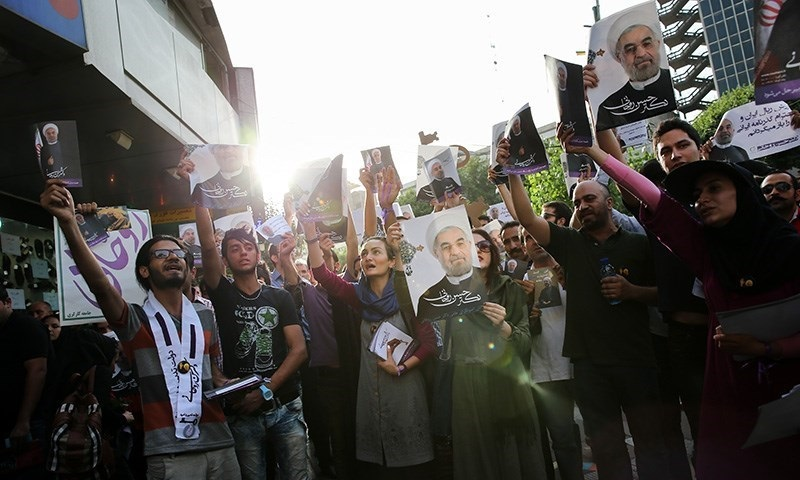
People for presidential candidates

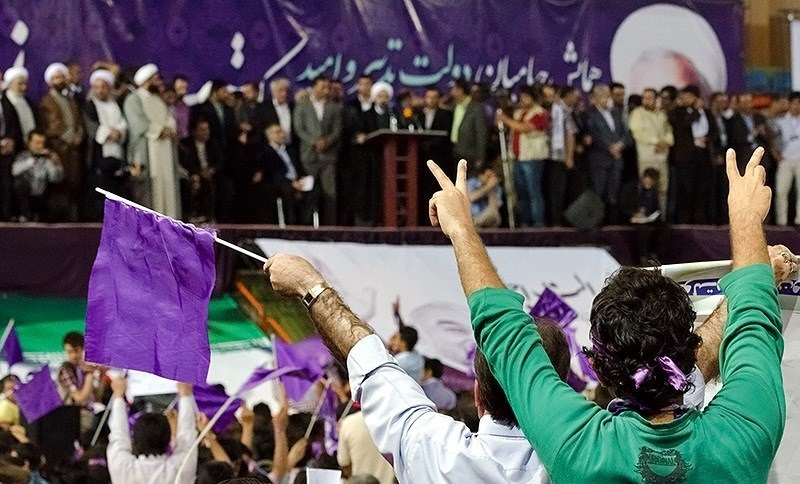
Rouhani among his supporters in Tabriz

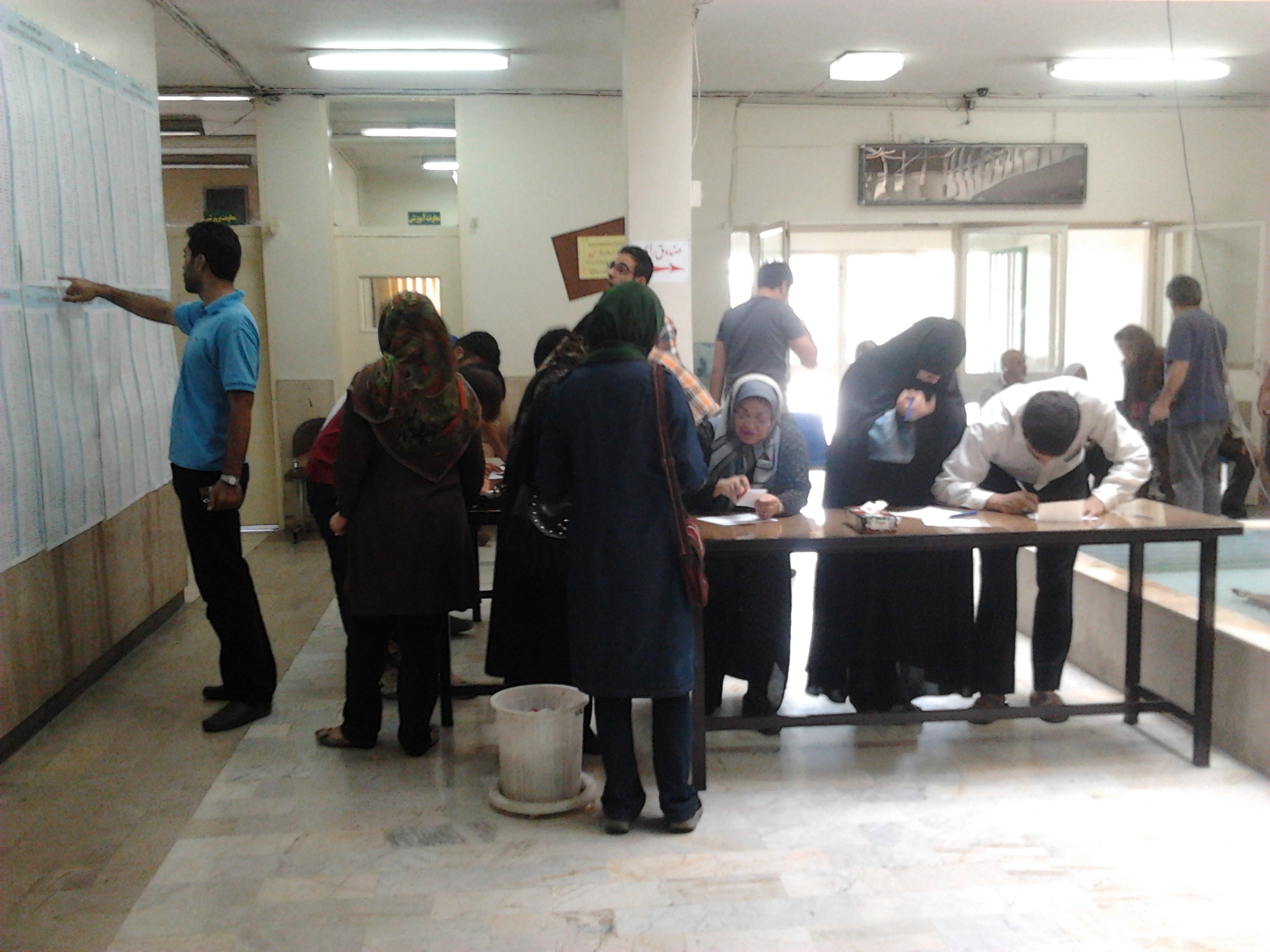
People voting on the election day

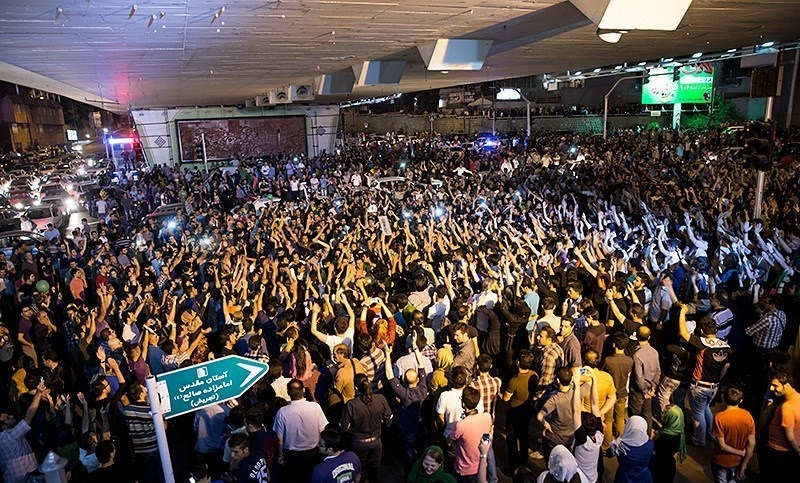
Rouhani supporters celebrating after the announcement of the results
