= Muhammad Khatami 2009 presidential campaign =

Khatami Presidential Campaign
- Campaign: Iran presidential election, 2009
- Candidate: Seyyed Mohammad Khatami; Former President 1997-2005
- Affiliation: Association of Combatant Clerics
- Status: Announced 8 February 2009; Endorsed Mir-Hossein Mousavi; 16 March 2009

Website
- khatami.ir

Mohammad Khatami, former President of Iran, announced his candidacy for the 2009 Iranian presidential election on 8 February 2009. Khatami later pulled out of the race.

== Campaign events ==
- On 10 February 2009, BARAN foundation claimed anonymous group of Ahmadinejad supporters tried to attack and beat Khatami with stick during annual march of revolution victory. Mohammad Ali Abtahi, close adviser to Khatami confirmed that report.
- On 12 February, Hossein Shariatmadari, editor-in-chief of hardliner newspaper Kayhan, wrote a controversial article and threatened Khatami with assassination like former Pakistan popular Premiere Benazir Bhutto.
- On 16 March, Khatami officially dropped out of the presidential race in order to endorse Mir-Hossein Mousavi, who he believed would stand a better chance for real reforms against the conservative establishment.
- Maziar Bahari of Newsweek magazine reports an unnamed adviser to Khatami told him that Supreme Leader Ali Khamenei "became quite upset" when he heard Khatami had decided to run for president, and "sent a personal message to Khatami asking him to step down." Khatami denied that the Supreme Leader made any such request.

== Endorsement ==
- Families of Iran-Iraq war martyrs including families of:
  - Air-Force Generals Babaei,
  - Air-Force General Sattari
  - General Bakeri
  - Former Minister Tondgooyan
  - General Jahan-Ara
  - Shiroudi
  - Ashrafi Esfahani
  - Labafi-Nejad

== See also ==
- 2009 Iranian presidential election
