= Javad Etaat =

Iranian politician and professor

- جواد اطاعت
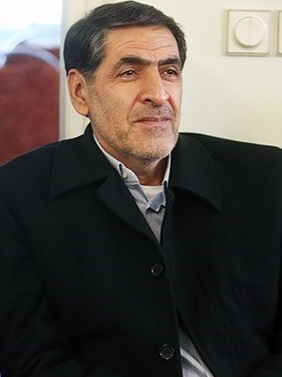

Member of the Parliament of Iran
- In office 28 May 2000 – 27 May 2004
- Preceded by: Ali Namdari
- Succeeded by: Ali Namdari
- Constituency: Darab

Personal details
- Born: 20 April 1963 (age 63) Darab, Pahlavi Iran
- Party: Islamic Association of University Instructors
- Other political affiliations: National Trust Party (2005–2009); Islamic Iran Participation Front (1998–2005); Baran Foundation
- Education: Shahid Beheshti University

Javad Etaat (Persian: جواد اطاعت; born 20 April 1963 in Darab County, Shiraz, Iran) is an Iranian politician and professor at Shahid Beheshti University.
