= Mohammad Reza Aref 2013 presidential campaign =

Wisely Government
- Campaign: Iranian presidential election, 2013
- Candidate: Mohammad-Reza Aref; Vice President of Iran, 2001–2005; Minister of Technology, 1997–2001
- Affiliation: Islamic Iran Participation Front (reformism)
- Headquarters: Tehran, Iran
- Slogan
- Chant: 'Livelihoods, decent and honest life with dignity and rationality'

Website
- Official website

Mohammad-Reza Aref (In Persian: محمدرضا عارف) served as the First Vice President of Iran, from 2001 to 2005 under Mohammad Khatami. Aref previously served as Minister of Technology in the first Khatami government. He is also a Sharif University of Technology professor. He announced his candidacy for the upcoming presidential election on 13 February 2013. On 11 June an announcement was made on his website that he is dropping out of the race.

== Election ==
The eleventh election of the President of Iran was scheduled to be held on Friday, 14 June 2013. Registration for candidates took place from 7 May and concluded on 11 May 2013. After the registration step, registered candidates had to be vetted by the Guardian Council in order to be on the ballot. The Guardian Council finally announced the list containing the name of a reformist candidate, Aref.

== Policies ==
=== Foreign policy ===
As a reformist presidential candidate, Mohammad Reza Aref, criticized the foreign policy of the Ahmadinejad government, vowing to improve Iran’s diplomatic relationships with other countries if elected.

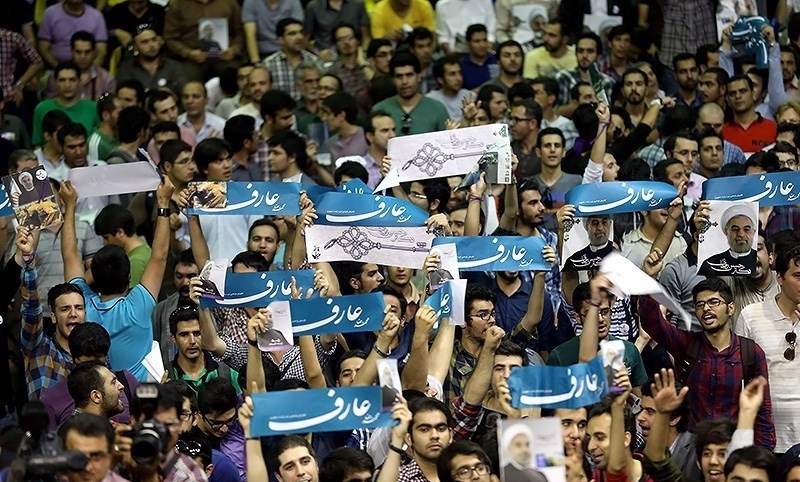
Convention in Shahid Shiroudi Hall

=== Economy ===
Aref denounces interference of external forces such as military organizations into economical firms. In the first debate among candidates, he criticized the point and when the moderator asked about the main problem of economy of the country, Aref replied in an apparent indirect reference to the powerful Revolutionary Guard's extensive business interests:

"Interference of some military people and military-affiliated companies in the economy has limited space for participation."

— Mohammad Reza Aref

== Endorsements ==
- Islamic Iran Participation Front, selected Aref as their nominate.
- Democracy Party, which introduced Kavakebian supports Aref after rejection of Kavakebian.
- Mohsen Mehralizadeh, Vice President of Iran and the head of the Physical Education Organization of Iran under President Khatami supported Aref and said: "Aref is able continue path of reformation after Khatami."
- Hadi Khamenei, key member of the reformist Association of Combatant Clerics, former deputy of the Majlis of Iran representing a district in Tehran and brother of the Supreme Leader.
List of individuals and political parties endorsing Mohammad Reza Aref
- Islamic Iran Participation Front
- National Trust Party
- Democracy Party
- Mohsen Mehralizadeh, former Vice President
- Hadi Khamenei, former Deputy of Parliament (Majlis)
- Farhad Majidi, footballer
