= The Culture of Nakedness and the Nakedness of Culture =

Study of Islamic and western views on clothing and culture

- Front cover of the 22nd printing
- Author: Gholam-Ali Haddad-Adel
- Original title: فرهنگ برهنگی و برهنگی فرهنگی
- Language: Persian
- Publisher: Soroush
- Publication date: 1980
- Pages: 76
- ISBN: 978-964-12-0326-1

The Culture of Nakedness and the Nakedness of Culture (Persian: فرهنگ برهنگی و برهنگی فرهنگی) is a book by Gholam-Ali Haddad-Adel, an Iranian scholar and intellectual, criticizing Western culture. The book focuses on the issue of women's rights and the hijab, and argues that Western clothing differs from that of Eastern societies due to the differences in their viewpoints on humankind. It also explains how Japanese clothing became Westernized.

The book was first published by Sorush Publications in 1980 and its twenty-third reprint was released in 2014. It has been translated into several languages, including an Urdu version translated by Yunus Jaffery.

== Content ==
The Culture of Nakedness and the Nakedness of Culture deals with the issues of women's rights and the wearing of the hijab by Muslim women according to Islamic teachings and traditions. According to Babar Awan, this is a "controversial subject" and has various effects both within Islamic societies and the West. It addresses the importance of hijab for Islamic societies and argues that a "society's culture determines its dress style". The Culture of Nakedness and the Nakedness of Culture discusses the effects of various factors on the form and size of clothing, without investigating those effects or discussing the quality and limits of clothing from a religious viewpoint. The relationship between Western clothing and culture, capitalism and clothing, historical backgrounds on nudity, the relationship between the hijab and Islamic culture, and the Westernization of traditional Japanese clothing, are among the subjects discussed in the book. Comparing "the dress philosophy in post-Renaissance Europe and non-Western societies", Haddad-Adel argues that "Western clothes are short and tight", while Eastern clothing is "long and loose", because these societies have "divergent notions of humankind".

== Reception ==
The book's launch event was held by the National Language Authority of Pakistan. According to Fateh Malik, Dean of Faculty, Islamic University of Pakistan, the book was much needed in Pakistan's present socio-cultural environment. The book is described by Zahra Pamela Karimi, a professor of art history at UMass Dartmouth, as one of the best examples articulating the anti "Western Pahlavi reforms and global influences" in Iran whose ideas were based on the "dichotomies of 'public' and 'private' and 'foreign' and 'local'". Haddad-Adel supports "the concealment of women's bodies as a way to protect the larger society from the manipulation of capitalism and imperialism", according to Pamela Karimi. According to Karimi, he tried to "catch up with modernity and yet indigenize it through Islam".

== See also ==
- Kashf-e hijab
- Western dress codes
- Western culture
