= Justus Hartnack =

Danish philosopher (1912–2005)

- Born: Johan Justus Daniel Gustav Volmer Hartnack; 29 May 1912; Copenhagen, Denmark
- Died: 1 May 2005 (aged 92); Helsingør, Denmark
- Occupations: Philosopher, professor

Academic background
- Education: University of Uppsala; University of Copenhagen (MA, PhD)
- Thesis: Analysis of the Problem of Perception in British Empiricism (1950)

Academic work
- Region: Western philosophy
- School or tradition: German idealism
- Institutions: Aarhus University; SUNY Brockport

Johan Justus Daniel Gustav Volmer Hartnack (29 May 1912 in Copenhagen – 1 May 2005) was a Danish philosopher, professor. He was the founder of department of philosophy at Aarhus University. He later joined SUNY Brockport where he became distinguished professor.

== Academic career in philosophy ==
During the German occupation of Denmark, he had to flee to Sweden, where he began studying philosophy at Uppsala University. There he was strongly influenced by the so-called Uppsala philosophy, a distinctly Swedish movement within logical positivism shaped especially by the philosophers Axel Hägerström and Ingemar Hedenius. After returning to Denmark he took the master's degree (magisterkonferens) in philosophy at the University of Copenhagen, and shortly afterwards he obtained a position, as a visiting lecturer at Colgate University (1946-1950) in the state of New York, in the United States. It was there that his interest in analytic philosophy arose, also known as ordinary language philosophy or common-sense philosophy, whose main figures were the British philosophers Bertrand Russell, G. E. Moore, Gilbert Ryle, J. L. Austin and, not least, the Austrian Ludwig Wittgenstein. Hartnack introduced this philosophical movement in Denmark upon his return.

In 1950 Hartnack received his dr.phil. from the University of Copenhagen. In 1954 he founded the department of philosophy at Aarhus University where he taught until 1972.

As professor of philosophy at Aarhus University, one of Hartnack's important tasks was to be in charge of the teaching for the filosofikum, the compulsory introductory philosophy course. For this teaching he wrote the textbook Filosofiske problemer og filosofiske argumentationer ("Philosophical Problems and Philosophical Arguments"), which came to leave its mark on countless students at the university in the following years. In 1972 Hartnack resigned from Aarhus University and was then for some years a Distinguished Professor at the State University of New York at Brockport. In addition, Hartnack gave guest lectures in a large number of countries, including Canada, Norway, Sweden, Scotland, Belgium, Argentina and Spain.

In his retirement from 1977 he wrote a large number of books. Somewhat paradoxically, in his later years his interest turned away from the anti-idealist and anti-metaphysical analytic philosophy and toward German idealism, and here not least the philosophy of Hegel.

=== Academic journals and associations ===
He was a member of the American Association of University Professors from 1948 to 1954 and of the American Philosophical Association from 1948, chairman (ledende senior) of the Aarhus Student Association (Århus Studenterforening) in 1955–56, and a member of its council of representatives in 1956–60. He was also Consulting Editor of Theoria, Swedish Journal of Philosophy and Psychology in 1958–69, a member of the Editorial Board of The New Dictionary of Philosophy from 1960 and of the Advisory Editorial Board of The Monist from 1961, and Consulting Editor of Metaphilosophy in 1968. He was a member of the Danish national committee for the history and philosophy of science, a member of the advisory committee (Comitato Consultivo) of the Centro Superiore di Logica e Scienze Comparate, a member of the International Federation of Philosophical Societies (FISP) in 1973, and a member of the International Platform Association in 1972.

== Selected publications ==
=== In English ===
- Hartnack, Justus (1 January 1998). Westphal, Kenneth R. (ed.). An Introduction to Hegel's Logic. Translated by Aagaard-Mogenson, Lars. Hackett Publishing. ISBN 978-0-87220-424-9.

=== In German ===
- Hartnack, Justus (1995). Hegels Logik: eine Einführung [Hegel's Logic: An Introduction] (in German). Translated by Kulas, Heinz. Lang. ISBN 978-3-631-48787-7.
