= Omid Iranian Foundation =

Iranian non-profit organization

Omid Iranian Fondation
- Established: 2009; 17 years ago
- Head: Mohammad Reza Aref
- Key people: Jafar Towfighi (Head of Board)
- Location: Headquarter: Tehran; Branches: Mashhad, Isfahan, Shiraz, Yazd, Zanjan, Zahedan
- Website: omidiranian.ir

The Omid Iranian Foundation (Persian: بنیاد امید ایرانیان) is an Iranian not-for-profit non-governmental organization, established in 2009. It is officially a research institute focusing on political and social sciences. However, some analysts believe it is strategically functioning as a "reformist political party" as it has branches nationwide. The head of this foundation, Mohammad Reza Aref, has stressed the organization's goals are not political, and contends it should remain a think tank for executive officials. Others have noted the foundation's possible political activity after 2017.

== See also ==
- BARAN Foundation
