= Mohammad Reza Aref =

Vice President of Iran

- محمدرضا عارف
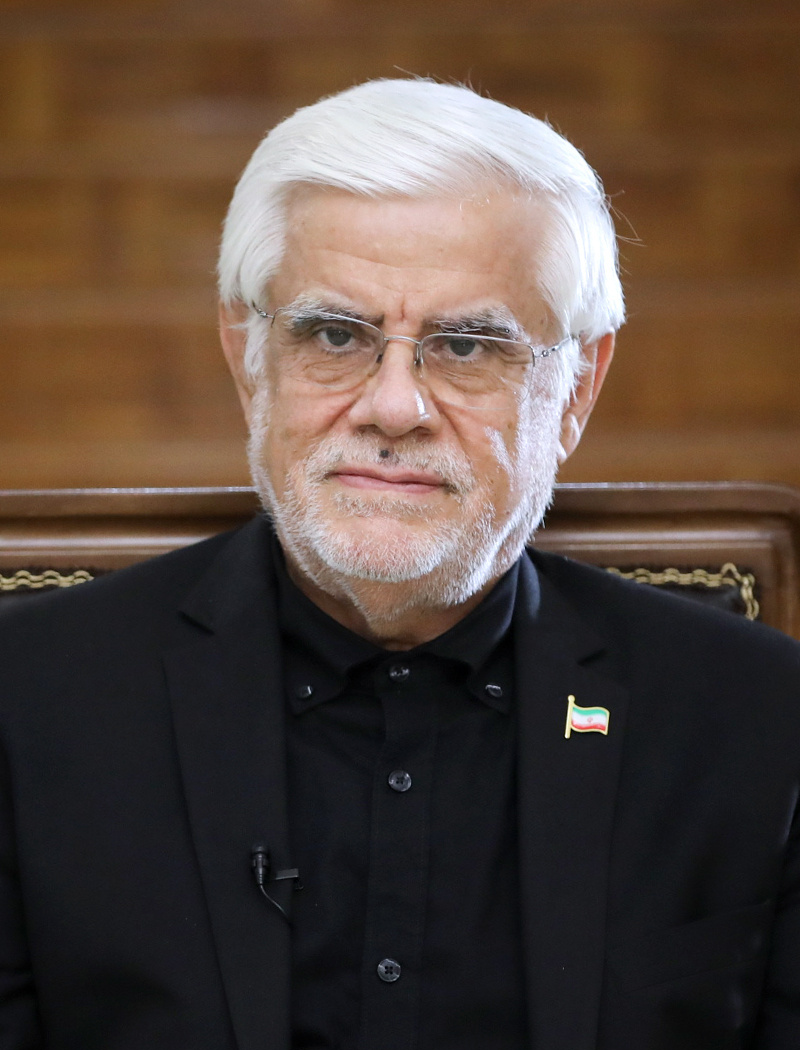
- Aref in 2025

First Vice President of Iran
- Incumbent
- Assumed office 28 July 2024
- President: Masoud Pezeshkian
- Preceded by: Mohammad Mokhber
- In office 26 August 2001 – 10 September 2005
- President: Mohammad Khatami
- Preceded by: Hassan Habibi
- Succeeded by: Parviz Davoodi

Member of the Parliament of Iran
- In office 28 May 2016 – 26 May 2020
- Constituency: Tehran, Rey, Shemiranat and Eslamshahr

Member of Expediency Discernment Council
- Incumbent
- Assumed office 16 March 2002
- Appointed by: Ali Khamenei
- Chairman: Akbar Hashemi Rafsanjani; Ali Movahedi-Kermani (Acting); Mahmoud Hashemi Shahroudi; Sadeq Larijani

Supervisor of Presidential Administration of Iran
- In office 26 August 2001 – 10 September 2005
- President: Mohammad Khatami
- Preceded by: Mohammad Hashemi Rafsanjani
- Succeeded by: Ali Saeedlou

Vice President of Iran Head of Management and Planning Organization
- In office 2 December 2000 – 11 September 2001
- President: Mohammad Khatami
- Preceded by: Mohammad-Ali Najafi
- Succeeded by: Mohammad Sattarifar

Minister of Post, Telegraph and Telephone
- In office 20 August 1997 – 17 June 2000
- President: Mohammad Khatami
- Preceded by: Mohammad Gharazi
- Succeeded by: Nasrollah Jahangard (acting)

Personal details
- Born: 19 December 1951 (age 74) Yazd
- Party: Omid Iranian Foundation
- Other political affiliations: Islamic Iran Participation Front (Founding member)
- Spouse: Hamideh Moravvej Farshi
- Children: 3
- Education: University of Tehran; Stanford University
- Occupation: Academic
- Website: ee.sharif.edu/~aref/

Mohammad Reza Aref (Persian: محمدرضا عارف; born 19 December 1951) is an Iranian engineer, academic and reformist politician who is the first vice president of Iran since 2024, under President Masoud Pezeshkian; he previously served as the first vice-president from 2001 to 2005 under Mohammad Khatami. He is also currently member of the Expediency Discernment Council since 2002.

He was the parliamentary leader of reformists' Hope fraction in the Iranian Parliament, representing Tehran, Rey, Shemiranat and Eslamshahr. Aref has also been heading the Reformists' Supreme Council for Policymaking since its establishment in 2015.

He was also the second first vice president from 2001 to 2005 under Mohammad Khatami and Mahmoud Ahmadinejad. He previously served as Minister Information and Communications Technology and head of Management and Planning Organization in Khatami's first cabinet. He was a member of Supreme Council of the Cultural Revolution until 2021. He is also an electrical engineer and a professor at University of Tehran and Sharif University of Technology. He was a candidate in the 2013 presidential election but withdrew his candidacy in order to give the reformist camp a better chance to win.

During the mass anti-government protests in 2026, he tendered his resignation, but it was not accepted by President Pezeshkian.

== Early life and education ==
Aref was born on 19 December 1951 in Yazd. His father, Mirza Ahmad Aref, was a famous businessman.

He received a bachelor's degree in electronics engineering from the University of Tehran in 1975. During his education at Tehran University, he led many protests and was arrested by SAVAK prior to the Iranian Revolution.

He then received a master's degree and a PhD in electrical and communication engineering from Stanford University in 1976 and 1980, respectively. His PhD thesis was on the information theory of networks, supervised by Thomas M. Cover. He introduced and analyzed deterministic relay networks which is later termed as Aref Networks.

== Career ==
During his political career, Aref has held important positions in the Islamic Republic of Iran. Following the Islamic Revolution of 1979, he began his political career. His first major political post was in 1981, when he became vice president of a communication company. He became acting president of the company in 1983, and became deputy minister of science the following year. Aref was a faculty member of Isfahan University of Technology until 1994.

Aref, who was a professor at University of Tehran, was elected as its chancellor in 1994. He created the Faculty of Social Sciences and also the Institute of Geophysics. After his appointment as minister of technology, Aref resigned as chancellor of Tehran University in 1997.

After Mohammad Khatami was elected President of Iran, he nominated Aref as the minister of post, telegraph, and telephone that was later renamed to minister of communications and information technology. In 2000, after resigned as Minister of Communication, he became the first head of management and planning organization.

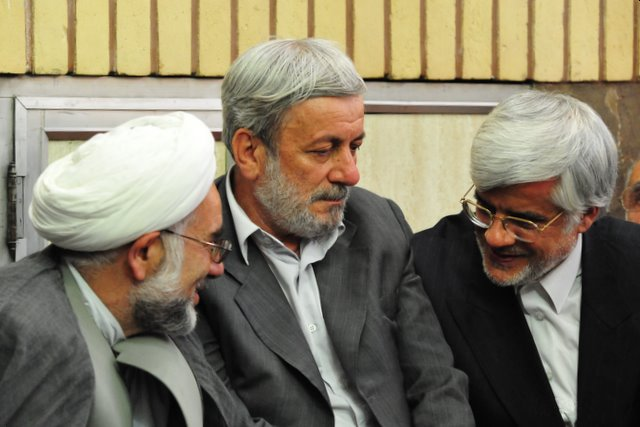
Aref during a campaign for supporting the Iranian Green Movement in June 2009

Khatami was reelected in 2001 and his former vice president Hassan Habibi resigned immediately after the election. Khatami then appointed Aref as his First Vice President. He served in this post until September 2005, when he was succeeded by Parviz Dawoodi after the election of Mahmoud Ahmadinejad. Then, he served as a professor in the department of electrical engineering at Sharif University of Technology, offering courses on cryptography, coding theory, estimation theory and Information Theory. He is currently one of the members of the Expediency Discernment Council that is an advisory unit for Iran's Supreme Leader.

Aref was nominated for the parliamentary election of 2008 as the reformist front's first in the list, but he withdrew to protest the rejection of some candidates by the Guardian Council. In June 2013, Aref announced that he together with other reformist figures was planning to launch a national party, namely Hope of Iran. On the other hand, Iran's president-elect Hassan Rouhani stated that Aref would be one of his cabinet members. However, Aref rejected Rouhani's invite for a political post (Vice Presidency or Ministry of Science) to focus on his party's establishment. He also announced his interest in becoming one of Rouhani's advisers in politics and human rights.

=== 2013 presidential election ===
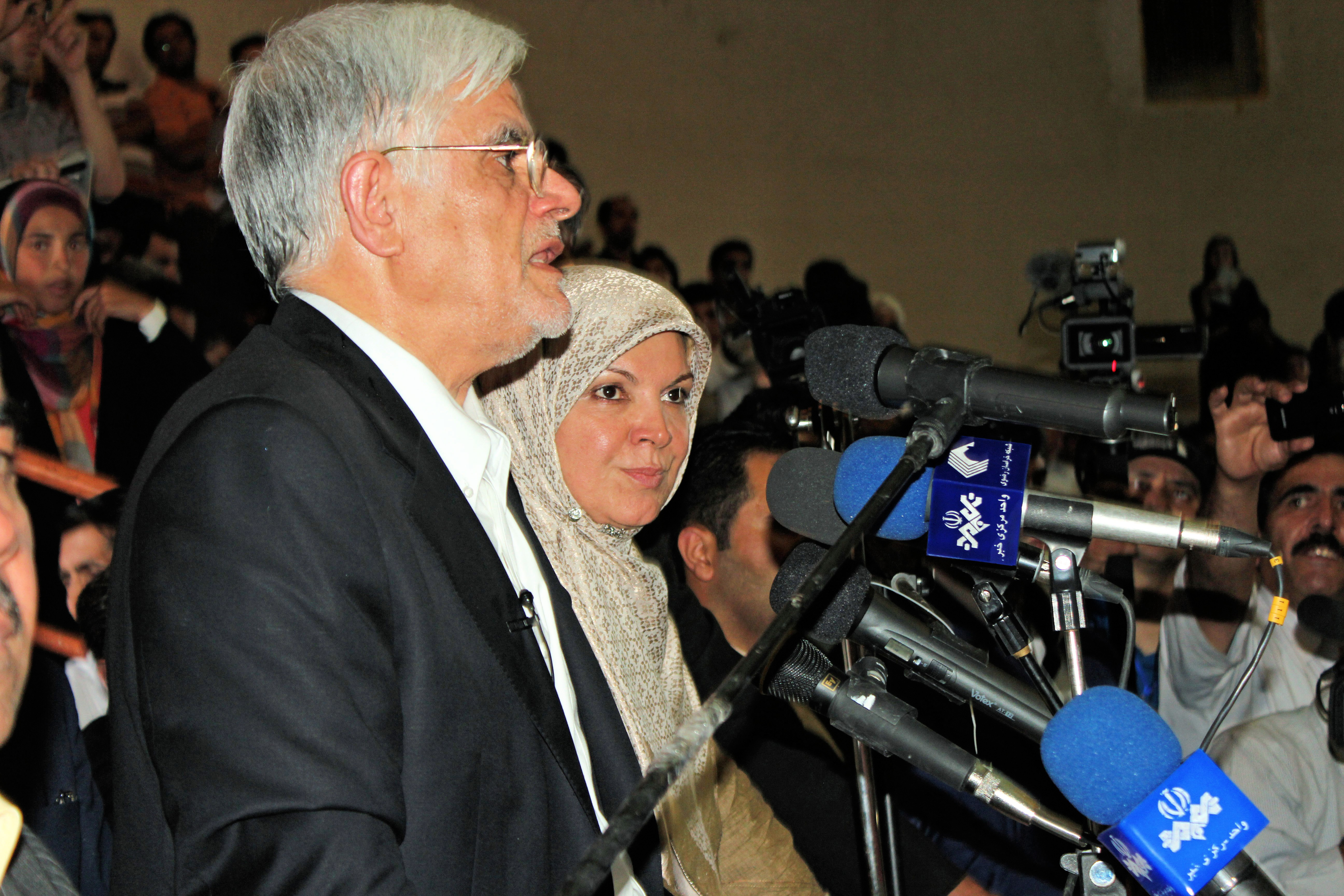
Aref and his wife Hamideh in Mashhad during a campaign meeting in 2013

Aref was one of the potential candidates for the presidential elections held in June 2013. He said that he would not stand if Khatami ran, but after Khatami declined, Aref announced that he would run in the election. He registered on 11 May 2013 and was confirmed by the Guardian Council. His major goals were lowering the unemployment rate and resolving high inflation. He pledged an extra 1 million jobs annually, which would include 200 thousand jobs from tourism development. He also added that if elected, his administration would bolster Iran's international relations and would find a "political solution" to closing the "[nuclear] dossier once and for all". Aref said he would remain "committed to the law" throughout the election process, promising to implement an economic plan to propel the country out of inflation, and to achieve development and progress. Aref censured the foreign policy of the Ahmadinejad's administration, vowing to improve Iran's diplomatic ties with other countries if elected president. He added that the next administration can have friendly ties with the world and improve the conditions in the country through such relations. Aref also said he would pursue and implement plans to further the presence and participation of the youth in various arenas of the country. Vowing to tackle unemployment, Aref said he aimed all-out development in various political, cultural, economic, and social fields.

By implementing the subsidy reform plan I will put bread on the tables. I have come to eradicate inflation and create one million job opportunities every year

Aref also said he is a reformist, and reform means safeguarding the ideals of the Islamic Revolution, accountability, and encouraging popular participation. He also called for investigation of alleged fraud in the 2009 election, and trial of effects in Death of Neda Agha Soltan and other deaths in the 2009–2010 Iranian election protests.

Aref announced his decision to drop out of the election in a statement issued late on 11 June 2013, in which he said the decision was made after he received suggestions from former President Mohammad Khatami, who advised him to stand aside. He also called on the Iranian people to vote en masse in the upcoming presidential election to create a political epic and maintain the dignity of the Islamic Republic of Iran.

=== 2016 legislative election ===
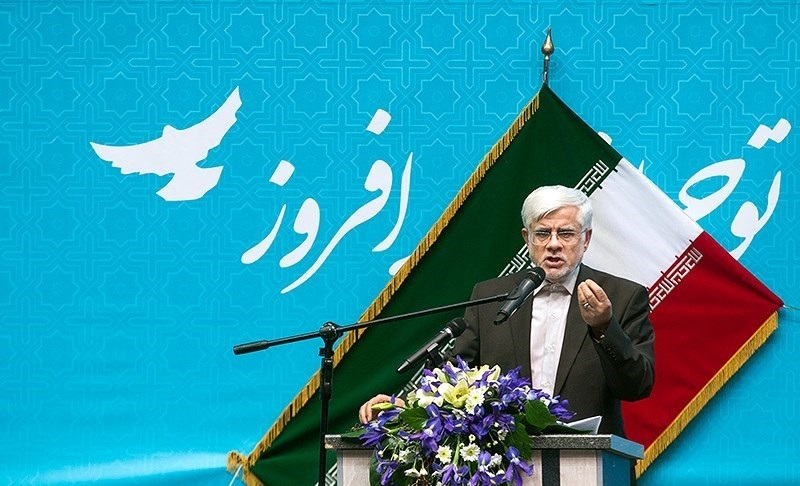
Aref speaking in reformist alliance's electoral meeting in Tehran in 2016

On 4 November 2014, Aref announced he would run for Parliament of Iran in the 2016 election from Tehran, Rey, Shemiranat and Eslamshahr district. He officially ran for the seat on 22 December 2015. He was also named as the Pervasive Coalition of Reformists' head list.

Aref was elected to the Parliament with 1,608,926 votes, which was the highest in the election. All other 29 Reformists candidates also run to the parliament, the first time since 1980 that all candidates are run from same party in Tehran district.

== Alleged assassination attempt ==
Iranian media alleged that Aref, serving as Iran's vice-president during the 2026 Iran war, narrowly escaped an Israeli assassination attempt on 16 March 2026. According to those Iranian news stories, reported in the The New York Times by Farnaz Fassihi, Aref was visiting a building in the Bonyad Shahid compound when Israel bombed it.

== Personal life ==
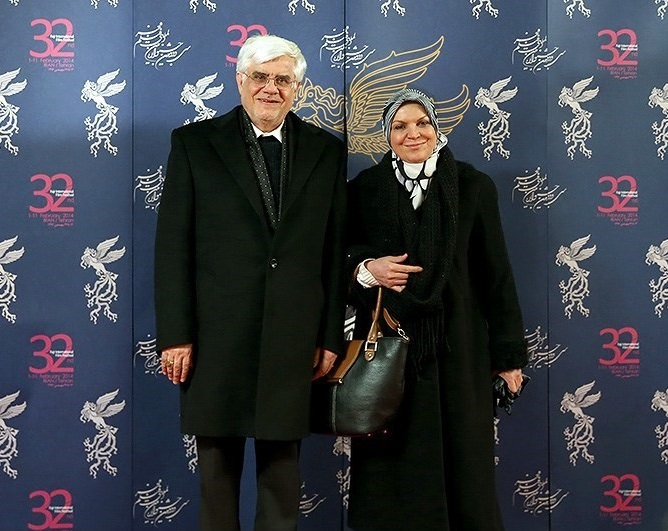
Aref and his wife Hamideh at the Fajr Film Festival in 2014

Aref married Hamideh Moravvej Farshi in 1976. Hamideh has a PhD in dermatology and also works at the ministry of science. They have three sons.

In 2017, his son Hamid Reza said in an interview "I'm proud that [my] capabilities come from 'good genes'...", which sparked controversy.

== See also ==
- List of Iranian officials

Assembly seats
| Vacant Title last held by Mohammad Reza Tabesh as Head of "Imam's line fraction" | Parliamentary leader of reformists Head of Hope fraction 2016–2020 | Vacant |
Academic offices
| Preceded by Gholam-Ali Afrooz | Chancellor of University of Tehran; 1994–1997 | Succeeded by Mansour Khalili |
Political offices
| Preceded by Mohammad Gharazi | Minister of Information and Communications Technology; 1997–2000 | Succeeded by Ahmad Motamedi |
| Preceded by Mohammad Ali Najafi | Head of Management and Planning Organization; 2000–2001 | Succeeded by Mohammad Sattarifar |
| Preceded by Hassan Habibi | First Vice President of Iran; 2001–2005 | Succeeded by Parviz Davoodi |
Honorary titles
| Preceded by Gholam-Ali Haddad-Adel | Most voted MP for Tehran, Rey, Shemiranat and Eslamshahr; 2016 | Succeeded by Mohammad Bagher Ghalibaf |
Non-profit organization positions
| New title NGO founded | Head of Omid Iranian Foundation; 2009–present | Incumbent |
Party political offices
| Preceded by Mohsen Aminzadeh | Campaign manager of Mohammad Khatami; 2009 | Vacant |
