= Mohammad Sattarifar =

Iranian economist

Mohammad Sattarifar (Persian: محمد ستاری‌فر; born 1952) is an Iranian economist, former Vice president of Iran, former head of the Iranian Social Security Organization and the Planning and Management Organization of Iran.

His views and beliefs have helped shape macro-level economic and development policies.

== See also ==
- Economy of Iran
- Intellectual movements in Iran
