= List of Iranian officials =

This is a list of Iranian officials with their titles.

== Heads ==
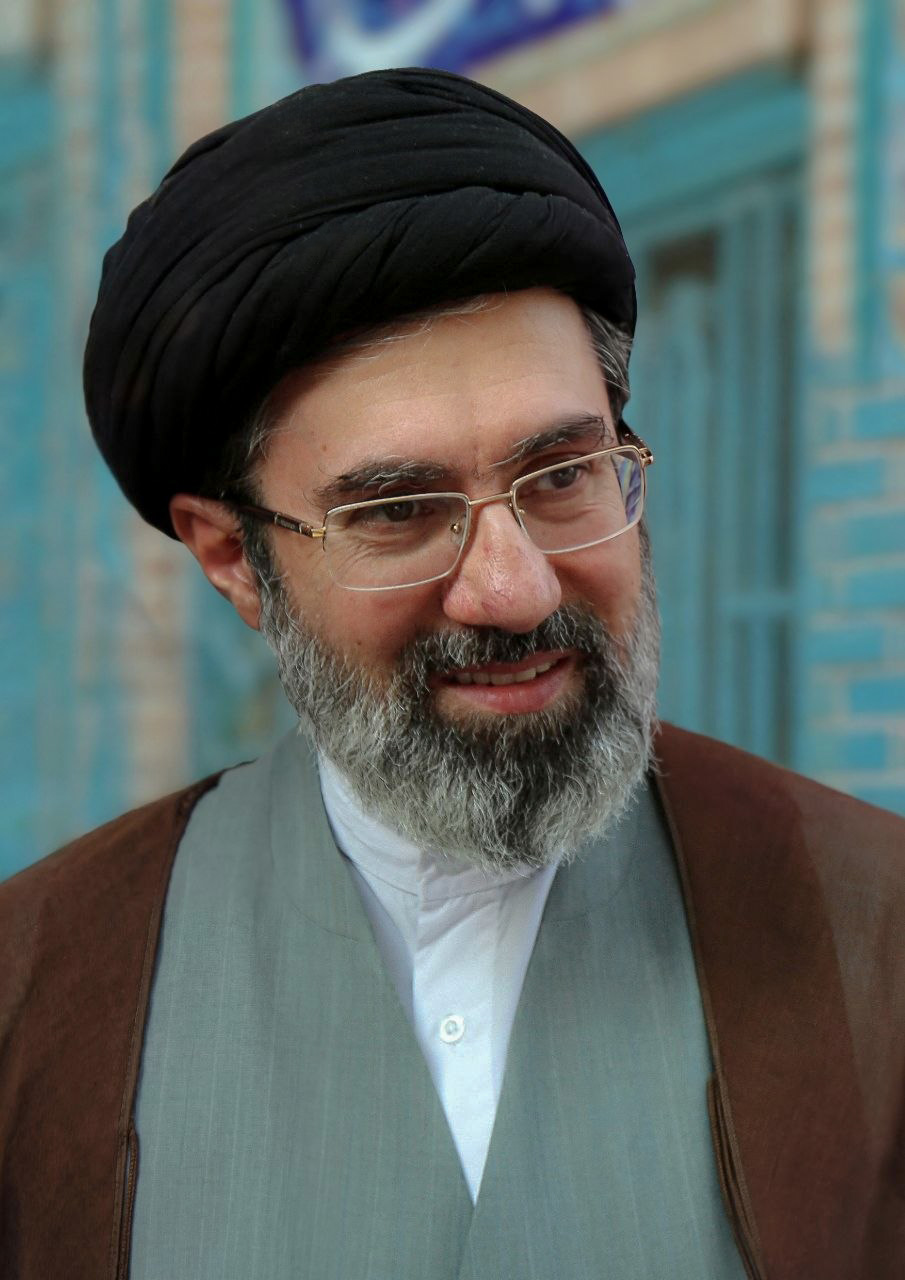
Mojtaba Khamenei

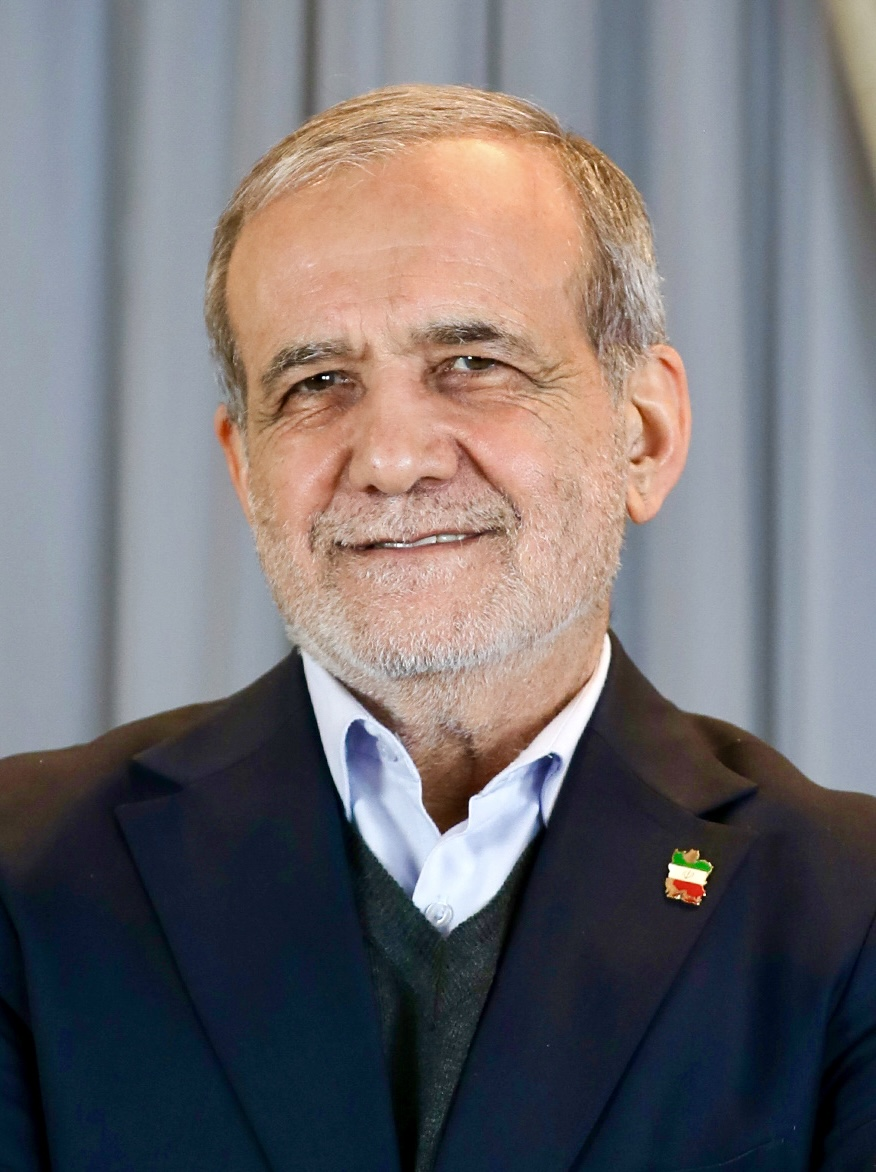
Masoud Pezeshkian

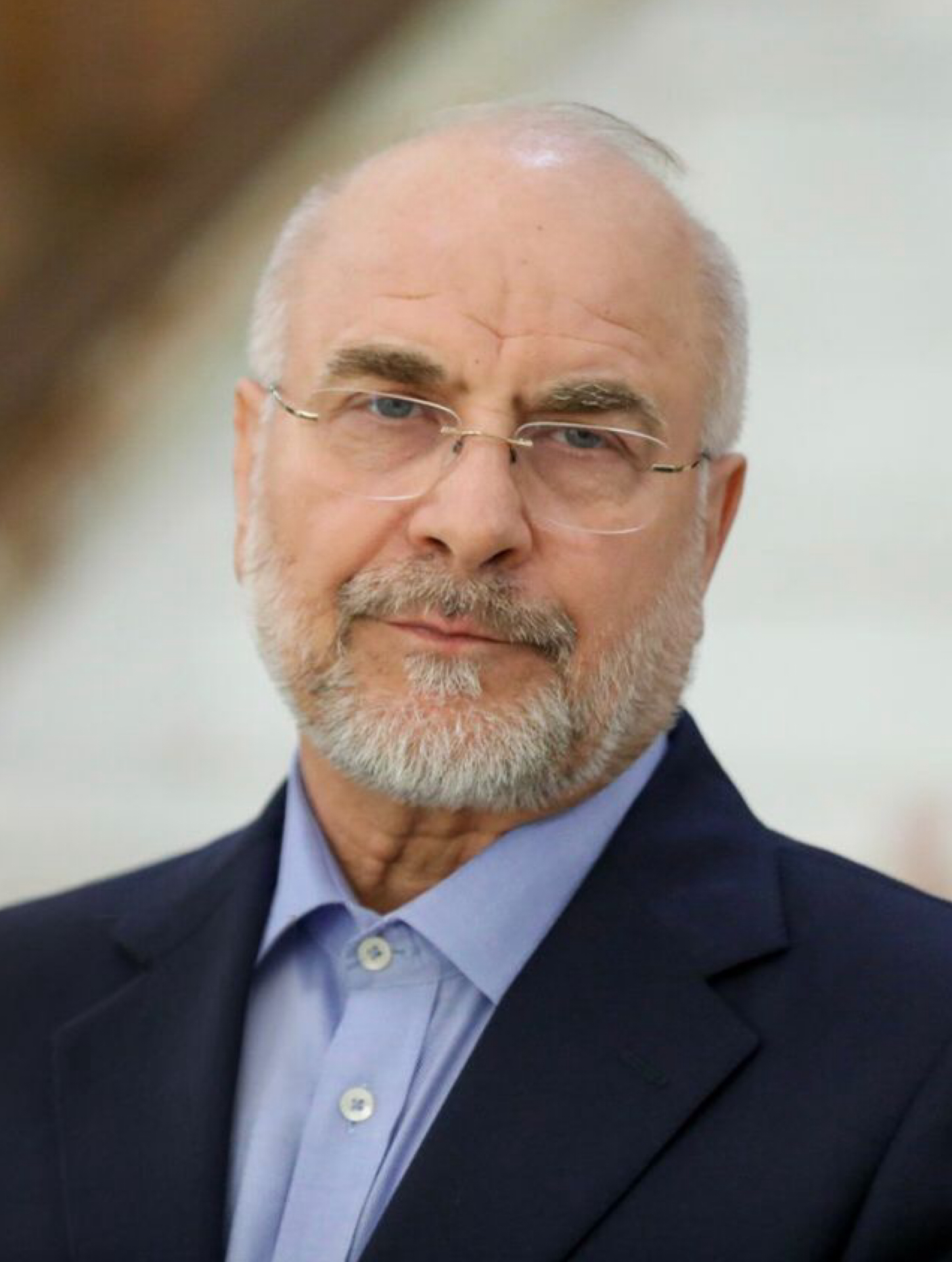
Mohammad Bagher Ghalibaf

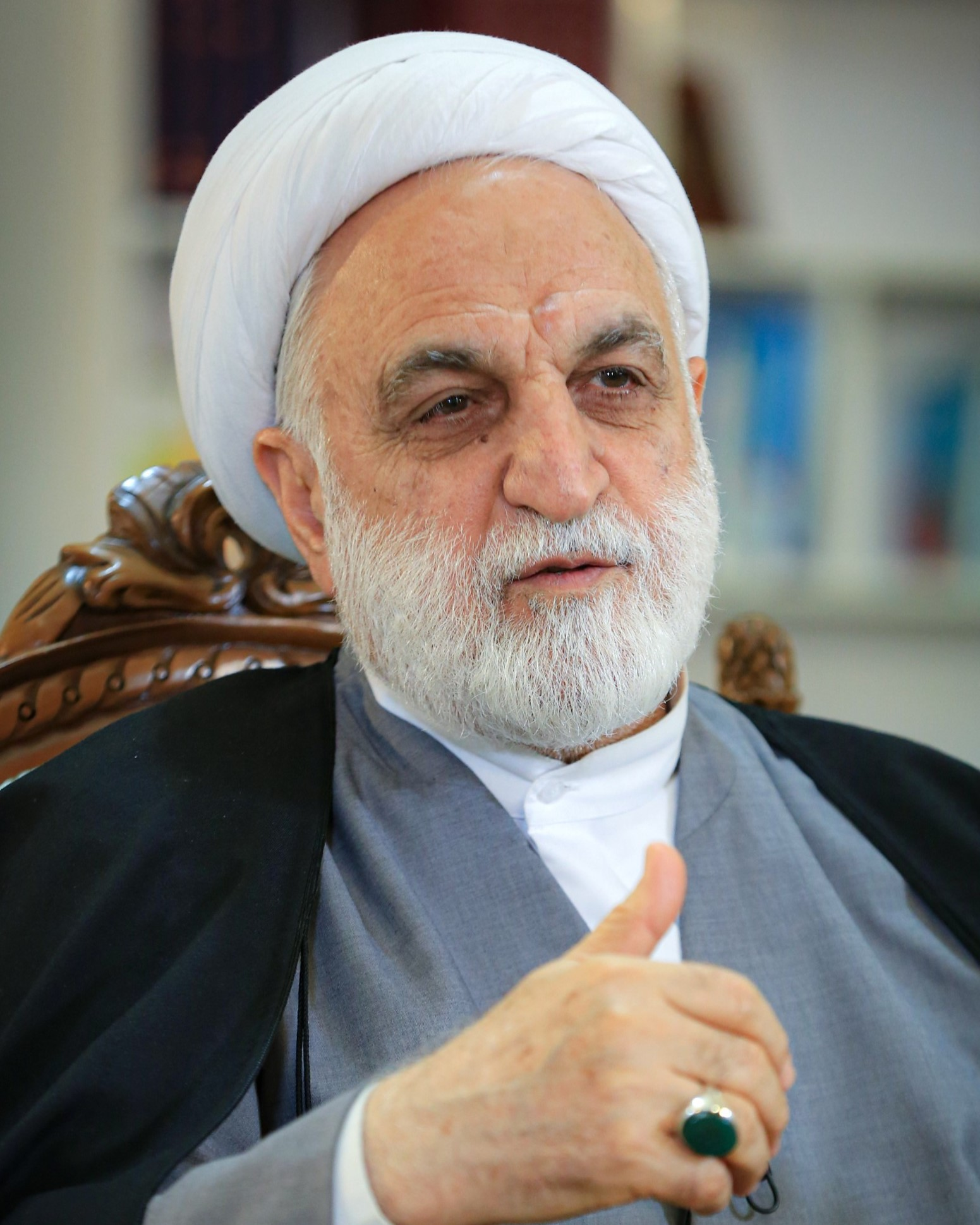
Gholam-Hossein Mohseni-Eje'i

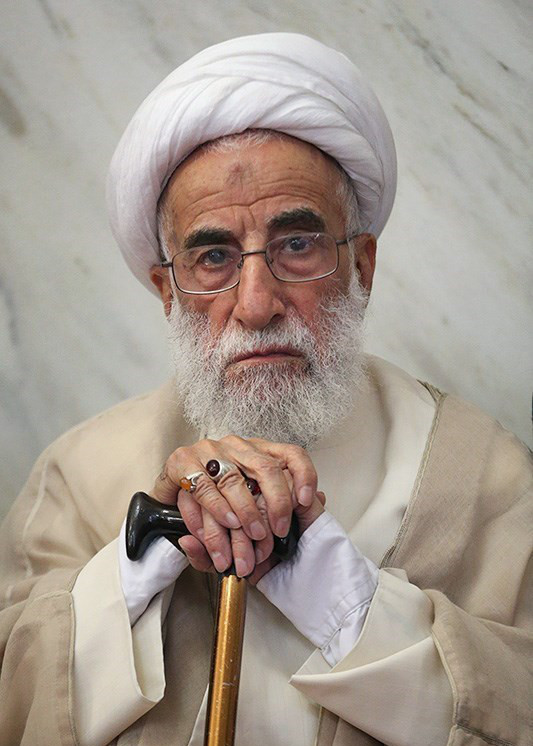
Ahmad Jannati

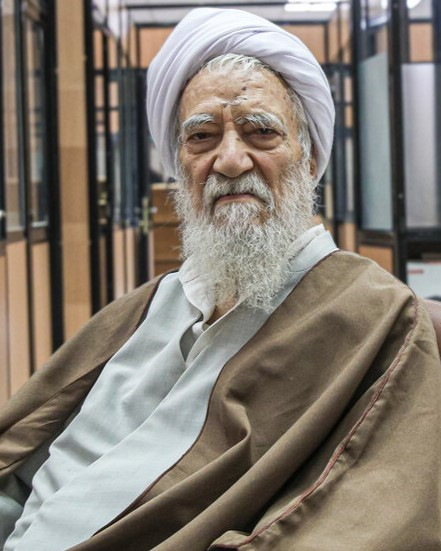
Mohammad-Ali Movahedi Kermani

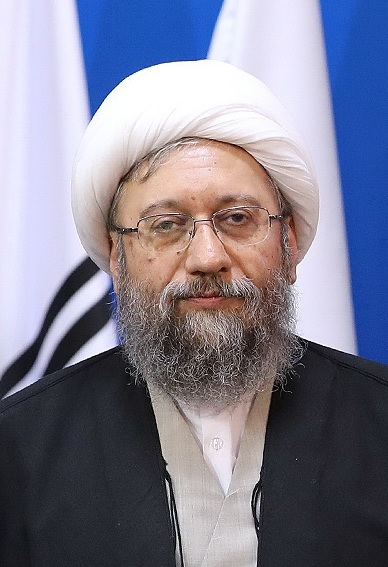
Sadiq Larijani

- Mojtaba Khamenei, Supreme Leader
- Masoud Pezeshkian, President
- Mohammad Bagher Ghalibaf, Speaker of the Parliament
- Gholam-Hossein Mohseni-Eje'i, Chief Justice
- Ahmad Jannati, Secretary of the Guardian Council
- Mohammad-Ali Movahedi Kermani, Chairman of the Assembly of Experts
- Sadiq Larijani, Chairman of the Expediency Discernment Council

== Vice presidents ==
- Mohammad Reza Aref, First Vice President
- Mohammad Eslami, Vice President and Head of Atomic Energy Organization
- Hossein Afshin, Vice President and Head of National Elites Foundation
- Shina Ansari, Vice President and Head of Department of Environment

== Council of Ministers ==
- Gholamreza Nouri Ghezeljeh, Minister of Agriculture Jihad
- Mohammad Atabak, Minister of Industry, Mine and Trade
- Sattar Hashemi, Minister of Information and Communications Technology
- Ahmad Meydari, Minister of Cooperatives, Labour, and Social Welfare
- Abbas Salehi, Minister of Culture and Islamic Guidance
- Mehrdad Akhlaghi, Minister of Defence and Armed Forces Logistics
- Seyed Ali Madanizadeh, Minister of Economic Affairs and Finance
- Alireza Kazemi, Minister of Education
- Abbas Aliabadi, Minister of Energy
- Abbas Araghchi, Minister of Foreign Affairs
- Mohammad-Reza Zafarghandi, Minister of Health and Medical Education
- Ahmad Donyamali, Minister of Sport and Youth
- Undeclared, Acting Minister of Intelligence
- Eskandar Momeni, Minister of Interior
- Amin Hossein Rahimi, Minister of Justice
- Hamid Bovard, Acting Minister of Petroleum
- Farzaneh Sadegh, Minister of Roads and Urban Development
- Hossein Simaee Sarraf, Minister of Science, Research and Technology
- Reza Salehi Amiri, Minister of Cultural Heritage, Handicrafts and Tourism

== Other members of cabinet ==
- Abdolnaser Hemmati, Governor of the Central Bank of Iran

== Other ==
- Mehdi Chamran, Chairman of the Islamic City Council of Tehran
- Mohsen Rezaei, Secretary of the Supreme National Security Council
- Alireza Zakani, Mayor of Tehran
- Peyman Jebelli, Head of IRIB
- Amir-Saeid Iravani, Permanent Representative to the United Nations

== See also ==
- List of Iranian ambassadors under President Khatami
- List of Iranian provincial governors under President Khatami
- List of Iranians
- List of mayors of Tehran
- List of presidents of Iran
