= Semnan–Damghan train collision =

2016 accident in Semnan Province, Iran

Train collision in Semnan–Damghan

- Location of the collision in Iran

Details
- Date: 25 November 2016
- Location: Damghan
- Coordinates: 35°38′0″N 54°2′34″E
- Country: Iran

Statistics
- Trains: 2
- Passengers: 542
- Deaths: 49
- Injured: 103

Two trains collided on the main line in Semnan province between Semnan and Damghan, Iran, on 25 November 2016, resulting in 49 deaths and 103 injuries. There were reported difficulties with the rescue operation due to the incident's remote location 4 km from the nearest station, Haft-Khan, and because only one helicopter could reach the scene immediately to join the rescue operation. It was the deadliest rail disaster in Iran since the Nishapur train disaster in 2004.

== Accident ==
The accident happened when an express train going from Tabriz to Mashhad stopped because of technical problems associated with cold weather between Semnan and Damghan. The second express train, which was travelling from Semnan to Mashhad on the same track, was ordered to stop by the dispatcher, and the signals turned red. The shift for the dispatcher changed before the technical problems with the first train were resolved. The second train asked for permission to resume its journey which was then approved by the new dispatcher. The second train reached full speed, and, at 7:50 AM, hit the stopped express train from behind. As a result of the collision, four carriages were derailed, two of which caught fire. Forty-seven passengers and crew from both trains were reported dead, and more than 100 were reported injured. The injured were airlifted to hospitals in Semnan and Damghan.

== Aftermath ==
The governor of East Azerbaijan province, where most of the victims were from, announced a day of public mourning in respect for the victims. The Iranian President offered his condolences to the victims' families and asked for an investigation into the accident to find out the causes and discover where the responsibility for the accident lies. Tehran to Mashhad railway line has been closed to allow an investigation.

On 27 November it was announced that managing director of the Islamic Republic of Iran Railways Mohsen Pourseyyed Aqaei resigned, offering an apology to the nation for the deadly incident.

== Reactions ==
- Abbas Akhoundi (Iran's Minister of Road and Urban Development) said "Since the incident occurred in a field under my management, I apologize to the bereaved families, the injured and all of the dear Azeris (people of provinces of West and East Azerbaijan)."
- In a statement, the French foreign ministry expressed its sympathy with the families of the injured and wished them a speedy recovery.
- The Turkish foreign ministry offered condolences in a statement reading, "We convey our condolences to victims' families and our friend and neighboring country, Iran, [and] wish a speedy recovery to those injured".
