= Rostam Ghasemi =

Iranian military officer and politician

Sardar Rostam Ghasemi
- رستم قاسمی
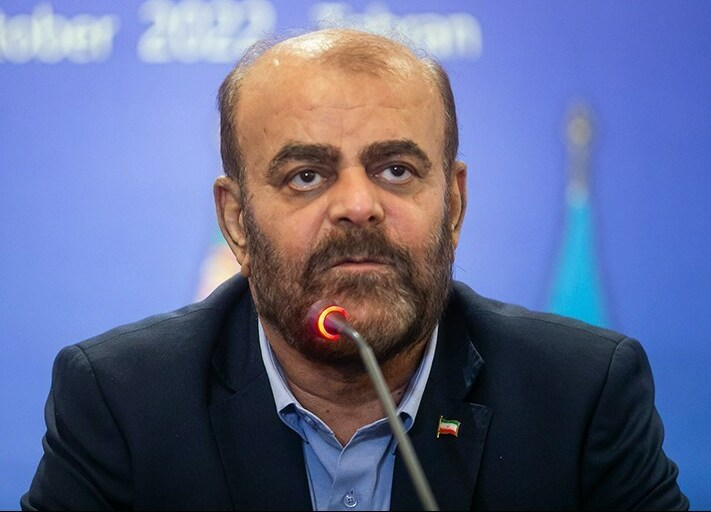
- Ghasemi in 2022
- Military career
- Allegiance: Islamic Revolutionary Guard Corps
- Branch: Quds Force (2013–2020); Navy (1990s)
- Service years: 1979–2011; 2013–2020
- Rank: Brigadier general
- Commands: Khatam al-Anbiya Construction Headquarters
- Conflicts: Iran–Iraq War; Syrian Civil War; Yemeni Civil War
- Awards: Order of Service (2nd class)

4th Minister of Roads and Urban Development
- In office 25 August 2021 – 22 November 2022
- President: Ebrahim Raisi
- Preceded by: Mohammad Eslami
- Succeeded by: Shahriar Afandizadeh (Acting) Mehrdad Bazrpash

Minister of Petroleum
- In office 3 August 2011 – 15 August 2013
- President: Mahmoud Ahmadinejad
- Preceded by: Masoud Mir Kazemi
- Succeeded by: Bijan Namdar Zangeneh

Personal details
- Born: 5 May 1964 Sargah, Mohr County, Fars province, Iran
- Died: 8 December 2022 (aged 58) Beijing, China
- Spouse: Marzieh-Sadat Mirshafiei (m. 1984–2007)
- Children: 4
- Education: Power and Water University of Technology

Rostam Ghasemi (Persian: رستم قاسمی; 5 May 1964 – 8 December 2022) was an Iranian military officer and conservative politician who was the Minister of Roads and Urban Development from 25 August 2021 to 22 November 2022. He was Minister of Petroleum from 3 August 2011 to 15 August 2013.

== Early life and education ==
Ghasemi was born on 5 May 1964 in Sargah village, Mohr County, Fars province. His father was a businessman and politician. He served as the governor of the Fars Province from 1980 to 1988. He graduated from Sharif University of Technology, studying civil engineering.

== Career ==
Ghasemi joined the Islamic Revolutionary Guard Corps (IRGC) in Kharg Island in 1979. He participated in the Iran-Iraq War. After the war, he joined the Khatam al-Anbiya troops in Bushehr, the Guards' engineering and construction company. In 1996, he was named head of the IRGC navy's Nouh base. Ghasemi became deputy commander of the troops in 2001.

He was the chair of the IRGC-affiliated Khatam al-Anbiya Construction Headquarters from 2007 to 2011. He retired from the military in August 2011.

On 26 July 2011, he was nominated as oil minister by Mahmoud Ahmadinejad to succeed Masoud Mir Kazemi. He was approved by the parliament on 3 August 2011, being the fourth oil minister in the Ahmedinejad government. He received 216 votes of the 246 Majlis members. He was the president of the OPEC for 2011, despite being on the US, EU and Australian sanction list since 2010. Ghasemi's tenure as oil minister ended on 15 August 2013, and he was replaced by Bijan Namdar Zanganeh in the post. Shortly after leaving office Ghasemi was appointed advisor to Defense Minister Hossein Dehghan on 22 August.

Ghasemi was seen in a photograph dated 2011 in Malaysia cuddling a woman without hijab alleged to be his non-married girlfriend, in conflict with the laws of the Islamic Republic of Iran's government when he was the minister of oil, a cabinet position in that government.

On 8 December 2022, Ghasemi died of illness in China, aged 58.

Government offices
Preceded by Masoud Mir Kazemi	Minister of Petroleum; 2011–2013	Succeeded by Bijan Namdar Zanganeh
Preceded by Mohammad Eslami	Minister of Roads and Urban Development; 2021–2022	Succeeded by Mehrdad Bazrpash
Military offices
Preceded by Abdolreza Abed	Commander of the Khatam al-Anbiya Construction Headquarters; 2007–2011	Succeeded by Abolghasem Mozaffari
