= Ebrahim Raisi 2017 presidential campaign =

- Campaign: 2017 Presidential Election
- Candidate: Ebrahim Raisi; Custodian of Astan Quds Razavi
- Affiliation: Combatant Clergy Association
- Status: Announced: 6 April 2017; Registered: 14 April 2017; Lost the election: 20 May 2017
- Headquarters: Mashhad, Iran
- Key people: Ali Nikzad (Chairman); Mehdi Hashemi (Campaign chief in Tehran); Sowlat Mortazavi (Representative in JAMNA); Masoud Mir-Kazemi (Head of Planning Committee); Ehsan Ebrahimi (Chairman of student campaign); Fatemeh Alia (Chairwoman of women campaign); Farhad Rahbar (Chairman of universities campaign); Nader Talebzadeh (Media advisor)
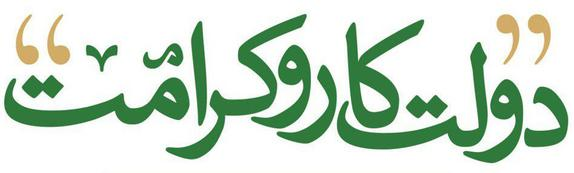
- Slogan(s): "Government of Dignity and Work" دولت کار و کرامت; Change in the interest of the people تغییر به نفع مردم
- Chant: Ebrahim Iconoclast; Beheshti smell is came

Website
- Raisi.org; Raisi-setad.com; Hamyanraisi.ir; Khadem96.ir

The Ebrahim Raisi 2017 presidential campaign began when Ebrahim Raisi, chairman of the Astan Quds Razavi, launched his campaign in April 2017 for the 2017 presidential election. Raisi's campaign pursued a populist agenda. His campaign ended in May 2017 with his electoral loss to then-incumbent president Hassan Rouhani.

== Early stages ==
In February 2017, Ebrahim Raisi was said to be backed by the Front of Islamic Revolution Stability and emerging as the conservative camp consensus candidate. One of the senior member of the front told press that his party tried to "persuade Ebrahim Raisi to stand for the elections, but did not succeed". On 23 February 2017, Raisi won the majority of votes during the meeting held by Popular Front of Islamic Revolution Forces, a newly established umbrella organization of conservatives.

Fifty out of the 88 members of the Assembly of Experts, whose names have not been disclosed, signed a letter supporting Raisi for president in March 2017.

== Branding ==
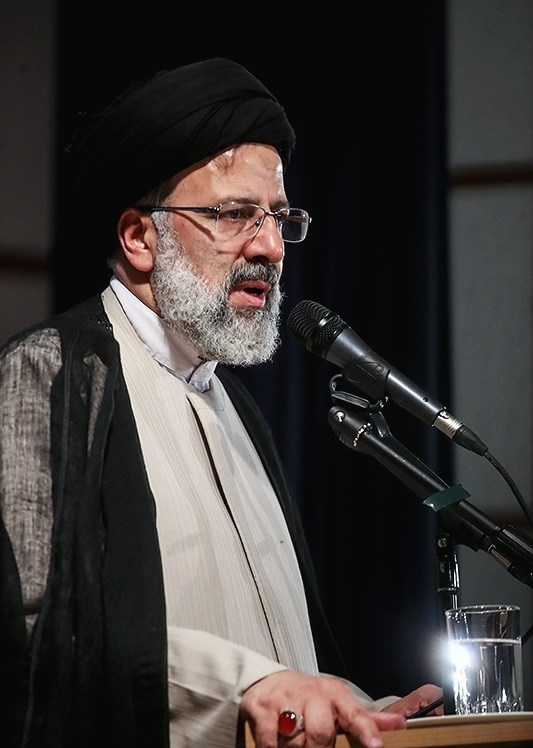
Raisi speaking after registration

Raisi's campaign focused on presenting him as a symbol of Mohammad Beheshti, Iran's chief justice assassinated in 1981. His campaign portrayed him as "man of the people"; when Mashhad was hit by an earthquake in early April, he cancelled his meeting in Tehran and said "it is necessary to be with the religious people of this land".

Raisi publicized pictures of his visits to poverty-stricken areas in remote villages, and opening an apartment complex for the families of Afghan fighters killed in Syrian civil war.

On 17 April 2017, Raisi wrote an open letter to Hassan Rouhani, recommending him to "observe moral codes". Raisi's campaign symbol was the "National identity card". On 15 May 2017, conservative candidate Mohammad Bagher Ghalibaf withdrew his candidacy in favor of Raisi. It was speculated that Ghalibaf would be Raisi's first vice president if he got elected. They also joined in a campaign rally in Tehran with each other.

== Media coverage ==
Iranian moderates and reformists criticized Iran's state-run television, Islamic Republic of Iran Broadcasting (IRIB), for "excessively reporting" on Raisi. According to Etemaad newspaper, television broadcasts showed Raisi as the prayer Imam regularly throughout the campaign. Raisi however wrote an open letter to IRIB head Abdulali Ali-Asgari, claiming it broadcast "biased advertisements" toward Rouhani because of coverage of his speeches as the President of Iran.

=== Social media activity ===
In March 2017, a determined campaign began in social media with circulating pictures of mostly young people, including liberal-looking women loosely wearing a hijab, holding pictures with the hashtag #RaisiCome (Persian: #رئیسی_بيا).

=== TV programs ===
Program title (Channel)	Time	File
Special conversation (IRIB2)	26 April 2017, 22:45–23:30	
Debate (IRIB1)	28 April 2017, 16:00–19:00	
With camera (IRIB1)	30 April 2017, 22:00–22:45	
Documentary (IRIB1)	3 May 2017,18:30–19:00	
Reply Iranian abroad (JJ1)	4 May 2017, 00:30–01:30	
Debate (IRIB1)	5 May 2017, 16:00–19:00	
Special conversation (IRIB2)	7 May 2017, 22:45–23:30	
Recorded conversation (IRINN)	10 May 2017, 21:30–22:00	
Debate (IRIB1)	12 May 2017, 16:00–19:00	
Reply Youths (IRIB3)	13 May 2017, 19:10–18:10	
Documentary (IRIB1)	14 May 2017,22:00–22:30	
Reply Iranian abroad (JJ1)	15 May 2017, 00:30–01:30	
Recorded conversation (IRINN)	16 May 2017, 21:30–22:00	
Reply Experts (IRIB4)	17 May 2017, 18:00–19:00	

== Political positions ==
=== Economics ===
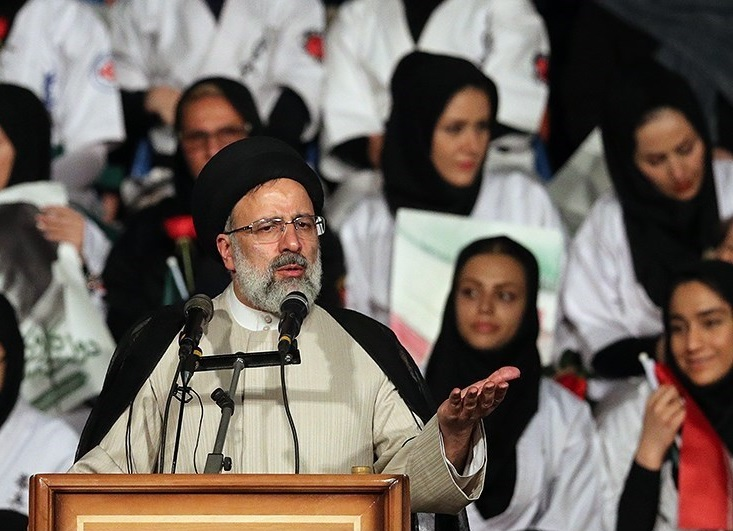
Raisi' speech in Tehran

Raisi said "I see the activation of a resistance economy as the only way to end poverty and deprivation in the country". He supported development of the agricultural sector, rather than spending money on shopping malls, which "will eventually benefit foreign brands". Raisi saw economic sanctions as an opportunity.

He promised to triple the monthly state benefits, currently Rls.450,000 per citizen, to tackle corruption and create six million jobs.

=== Foreign policy ===
Answering reporters about his foreign policy, he said it "would be to establish ties with every country except Israel”.

=== Sex segregation ===
Ebrahim Raisi was one of the supporters of Sex segregation. He said in a 2014 interview that "I think this is a good move because the majority of women do a better job in a totally relaxed atmosphere and fit are required", in reference to planned segregation in Tehran Municipality. He was also supporter of Islamization of universities, revision of the Internet, and dealing with Western culture.

== Provincial visits ==
Province	Date	Ref
South Khorasan	25 April	
Yazd	25 April	
Qazvin	30 April	
Zanjan	30 April	
Hormozgan	1 May	
Hamedan	2 May	
Kermanshah	2 May	
Ilam	3 May	
Lorestan	3 May	
Qom	6 May	
Markazi	7 May	
Khuzestan	8 May	
Sistan and Baluchestan	9 May	
Kerman	9 May	
Chaharmahal and Bakhtiari	13 May	
Ardabil	13 May	
East Azerbaijan	13 May	
West Azerbaijan	13 May	
Golestan	14 May	
Mazandaran	14 May	
Gilan	14 May	
Kohgiluyeh and Boyer-Ahmad	15 May	
Fars	15 May	
Isfahan	15 May	
Bushehr	15 May	
Alborz	16 May	
Tehran	16 May	
North Khorasan	16 May	

== Endorsements ==
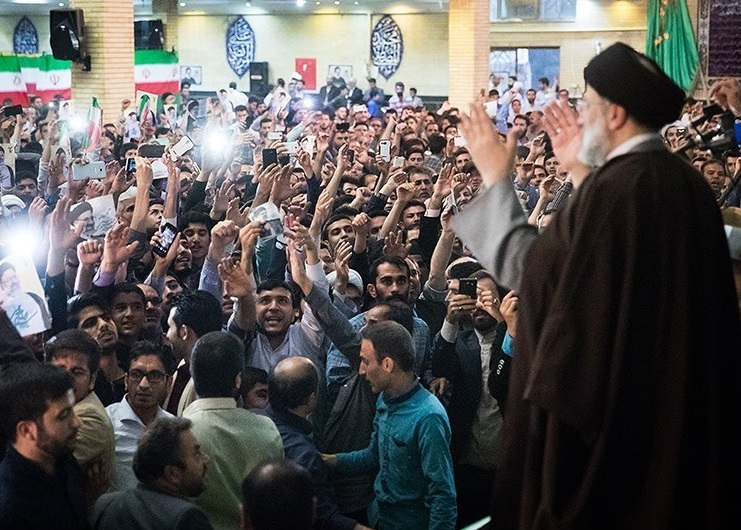
Raisi campaign rally in Tehran

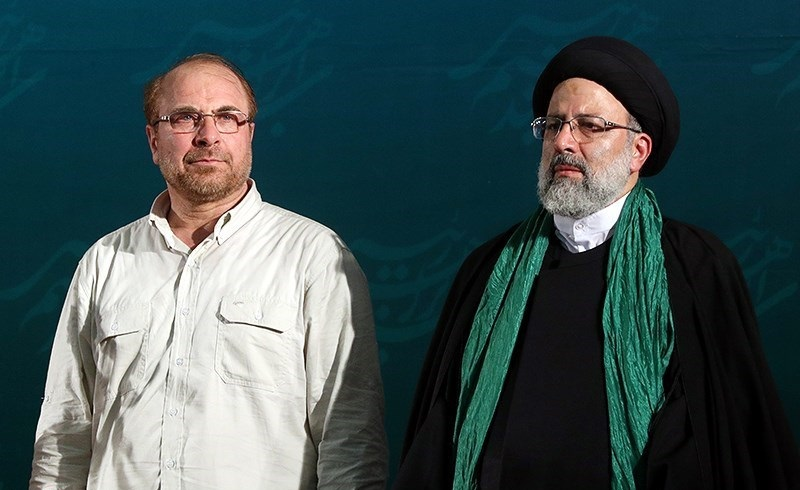
Ebrahim Raisi and Mohammad Bagher Ghalibaf at a campaign rally in Tehran, 16 May 2017

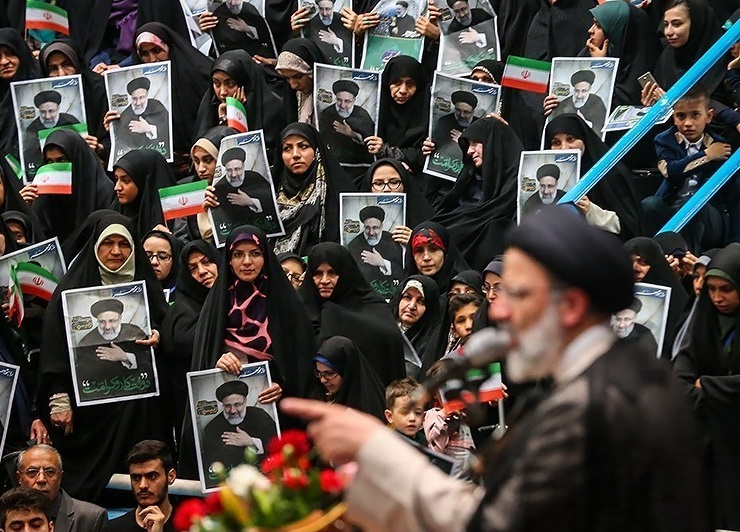
Raisi campaign rally in Qazvin

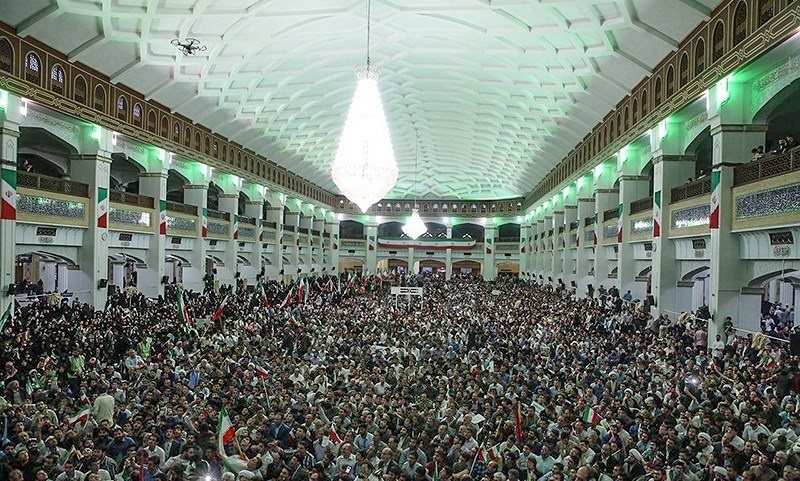
Raisi campaign rally in Tabriz

=== Organizations ===
- Union of Islamic Student Societies
- Front of Islamic Revolution Stability
- Resistance Front of Islamic Iran
- Front of Followers of the Line of the Imam and the Leader
- YEKTA Front
- Combatant Clergy Association
- Society of Seminary Teachers of Qom
- Islamic Society of Engineers
- Ansar-e-Hezbollah
- Islamic Labours' Welfare Party
- National Reconciliation and Islamic Progress Party
- Popular Staff for Serving Nation
- Justiceseekers Party of Islamic Iran

=== Individuals ===
- Mohammad-Bagher Ghalibaf, withdrew candidate

Assembly of Experts members

- Ahmad Alamolhoda
- Mohammad-Taqi Mesbah-Yazdi (former)

MPs

- Mohammad Mehdi Zahedi
- Javad Karimi-Ghodousi
- Nader Ghazipour
- Alireza Zakani (former)
- Mehrdad Bazrpash (former)
- Bijan Nobaveh-Vatan (former)

Former ministers

- Mohammad Abbasi
- Ali Nikzad
- Masoud Mir-Kazemi
- Marzieh Vahid-Dastjerdi
- Mohammad Soleimani
- Alireza Marandi

Former vice presidents

- Masoud Zaribafan
- Fereydoon Abbasi

Former vice ministers

- Saeed Jalili
- Ezzatollah Zarghami

Judiciary officials

- Saeed Mortazavi (former)
- Javad Larijani

Artists

- Masoud Dehnamaki
- Amir Tataloo

Athletes

- Kioumars Hashemi

Others

- Alireza Panahian
- Hassan Abbasi

== Controversy ==
Raisi's practice of distributing flour among the poor was criticized and compared to Mahmoud Ahmadinejad's similar distribution of potatoes before 2009 presidential election.
