= Jason Rezaian =

Iranian-American journalist

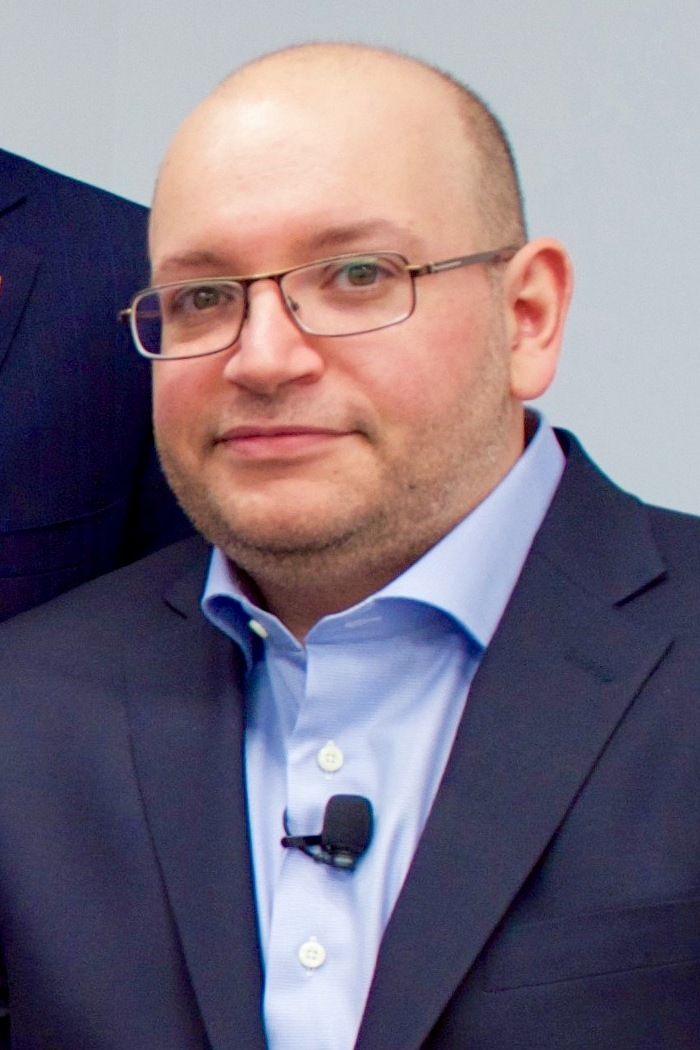
- Jason Rezaian in 2016
- Born: March 15, 1976 (age 50); Marin County, California, U.S.
- Citizenship: United States, Iran
- Education: The New School
- Occupation: Journalist
- Employer: The Washington Post
- Spouse: Yeganeh Salehi
- Parents: Taghi Rezaian (father); Mary Rezaian (mother)
- Website: Washington Post Bio

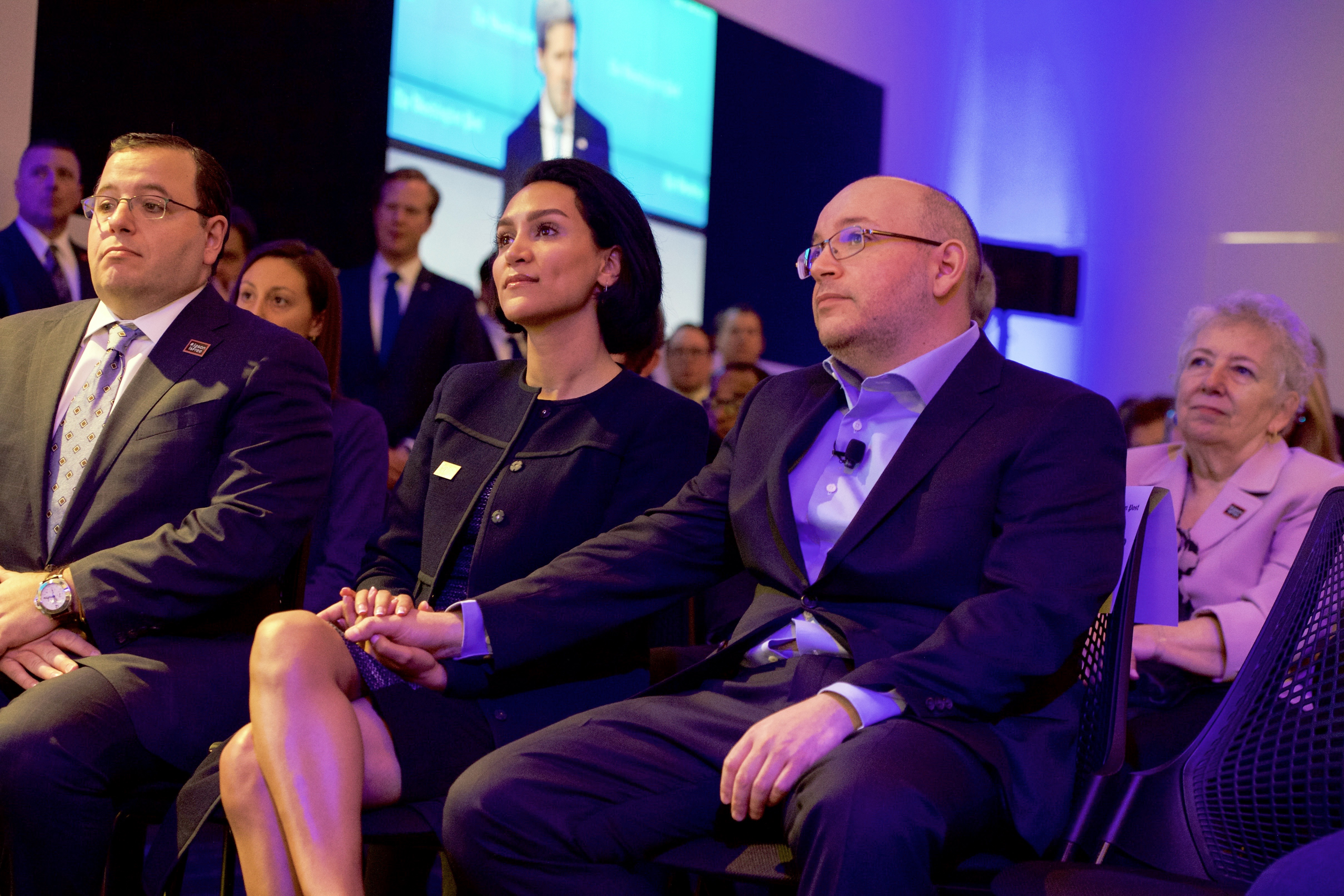
Jason Rezaian and his wife watch a lecture on press freedom by John Kerry after Rezaian's release

Jason Rezaian (Persian: جیسون رضائیان; born on March 16, 1976) is an Iranian-American journalist who served as Tehran bureau chief for The Washington Post. He was convicted of espionage in a closed-door trial in Iran in 2015.

On July 22, 2014, Iranian authorities arrested Rezaian and his wife, Yeganeh Salehi, and took the couple into custody, accusing them of espionage. While Salehi – also a journalist – was released on October 6, Rezaian remained in custody at Evin Prison, a detention center in Tehran known for housing political prisoners and intellectuals. After nine months, it was made public on April 20, 2015, that Iranian authorities had indicted him on four charges, including espionage and "propaganda against the establishment". His trial began on May 26, 2015. His conviction was announced on October 11, 2015. On November 22, 2015, Iranian officials said he had been sentenced to a prison term, the length of which was not disclosed. On January 16, 2016, it was announced that he had been released.

Rezaian wrote a book, Prisoner: My 544 Days in an Iranian Prison, published in January 2019, detailing his experience in captivity in Iran. He released a podcast called 544 Days in 2021.

== Biography ==
Rezaian was born March 15, 1976, and raised in Marin County, California, in the San Francisco Bay Area. He attended Wheaton Central High School in Wheaton, Illinois, in his freshman and sophomore years from 1990 to 1992, before transferring to Marin Academy in San Rafael, California, where he got his high school diploma. He holds both American and Iranian citizenship. His late father, Taghi, immigrated to the U.S. from Iran in 1959; and belonged to a Shia family who were caretakers of the Shia shrine in Mashhad, Iran. His mother, Mary (née Breme), of Evangelical Christian heritage originally from Chicago, moved from the U.S. to Turkey following her husband's death. Rezaian also has one brother.

External videos
- After Words interview with Rezaian on Prisoner, February 23, 2019, C-SPAN

Rezaian had been based in Iran as a journalist since 2009. Before becoming the Post's Tehran correspondent in 2012, he wrote for other publications such as the San Francisco Chronicle and Monocle. His wife, Yeganeh Salehi, is an Iranian citizen who is a correspondent for The National, a newspaper based in the United Arab Emirates. After Salehi was arrested, her press credentials were revoked.

Rezaian was the 2016 recipient of the McGill Medal for Journalistic Courage from the Grady College of Journalism and Mass Communication. In October 2024, he was named director of press freedom initiatives at The Washington Post.

== Arrest and detention ==
On the night of July 22, 2014, Iranian government security forces raided Rezaian's Tehran residence and arrested him and his wife. The agents reportedly confiscated laptops, books, and notes. In a separate raid that night, security forces also arrested a female photojournalist and her husband, both American citizens. The Washington Post first reported news of the arrests on July 24. On July 25, Tehran Justice Department head Gholam-Hossein Esmaili confirmed the arrests. Esmaili said, "We are now in the investigation phase. I think we will be able to provide more information after technical investigation and questioning." He did not say why they had been arrested. He added, "The security forces have the whole country under surveillance and control the activities of enemies. They will not permit our country to become a land where our enemies and their agents carry out their activities."

The photojournalist and her husband were released within weeks, while Rezaian's wife, Salehi, was released on bail on October 6. Iranian authorities did not disclose Rezaian's whereabouts or welfare, nor did they reveal the circumstances surrounding the couple's arrest and subsequent detention. Officials from the Iranian judiciary and Ministry of Culture and Islamic Guidance have reportedly told journalists that the case is "security"-related and investigating it "is dangerous".

On December 7, the U.S. State Department announced Rezaian had been charged by an Iranian court with unspecified offenses. According to State, he was denied bail, he had not been allowed to speak with his attorney, and the Iranian government repeatedly denied requests by then-US Secretary Of State John Kerry for consular services via the Swiss Embassy, the U.S. protecting power in Iran. In a statement, Kerry reiterated calls to release Rezaian, as well as Amir Hekmati, Saeed Abedini, and Robert Levinson – three other Americans also detained in Iran as of that date.

On January 15, 2015, an Iranian prosecutor told state media that Rezaian would stand trial in Iran in a Revolutionary Court on unspecified charges. A few weeks later on February 1, his family announced the case would be heard by Judge Abolghassem Salavati, a controversial figure in the Iranian court system known for handing down harsh sentences (including extensive prison terms, lashings, and death) to political prisoners and those regarded as a threat to national security. On March 1, after more than seven months in detainment, Rezaian was granted permission to hire a court-approved attorney.

On April 20, 2015, The Washington Post reported that Iranian authorities were charging Rezaian with espionage and three other serious crimes, including "collaborating with hostile governments" and "propaganda against the establishment." The statement, issued from Tehran by his attorney Leilah Ahsan, was provided to the Post by the family of the imprisoned reporter.

== Trial ==
Rezaian's trial began on May 26, 2015 at Branch 15 of the Tehran Revolutionary Court. The proceedings were not open to the public. According to his brother, Ali Rezaian, the Iranian government rested its accusations on two pieces of evidence: an American visa application for Jason's wife, Yeganeh Salehi, and a form letter sent to Barack Obama's 2008 White House transition team offering assistance in improving Iran-U.S. relations. On October 12, The Washington Post said that Rezaian had been convicted. On November 22, a spokesman for the Iranian judiciary said Rezaian had been "sentenced" to "prison", but did not provide further details.

== Reactions ==
=== Media ===
Six weeks before their arrests, Rezaian and Salehi were filmed for the CNN docuseries Parts Unknown, where they had discussed Iranian culture and their heritage with host Anthony Bourdain. In writing for The Washington Post, Bourdain expressed shock over the couple's detention, stating: "These are good people, much loved and admired all over the world. I am, unfortunately, growing used to seeing bad things happening to good people. But this I can’t get used to, or ever understand. This wonderful couple is a danger to no one. They are nobody’s enemy. They are without blame or malice."

A column in Vatan-e-Emrooz, a Persian newspaper, has accused Rezaian of directing and distributing "Happy Iranians", a tribute video of the Pharrell Williams song "Happy", which was controversial in Iran and led to arrests of the participants. The column also alleged that Rezaian and his wife were American spies and might be acting as a liaison for the U.S.-based National Iranian American Council lobbying group. According to Agence France-Presse, such allegations were unsubstantiated. In writing for The New Yorker, journalist Laura Secor asserted the "recognizably trumped-up charges" were "both patently absurd and entirely run-of-the-mill for Iran."

Some sources believe the timing of the arrest and subsequent announcements of Rezaian's legal status were calculated to influence Iran's president, Hassan Rouhani, in nuclear proliferation talks with the United States. The New York Times noted that Rezaizan "may be serving as a pawn" in an internal Iranian struggle between reformers like Rouhani and hard-liners.

In July 2015, journalist Major Garrett made headlines when he asked President Obama during a press conference why he was "content" with the Iran Nuclear Deal that left four Americans trapped in Iran, referring to Rezaian and three others (Amir Mirza Hekmati, Saeed Abedini, and Robert Levinson). Obama admonished Garrett by responding, "I’ve got to give you credit, Major, for how you craft those questions. The notion that I am 'content' as I celebrate with American citizens languishing in Iranian jails, Major, that’s nonsense, and you should know better. Now, if the question is why we did not tie the negotiations to their release, think about the logic that creates. Suddenly, Iran realizes, 'You know what? Maybe we can get additional concessions out of the Americans by holding these individuals.'"

Reporters Without Borders stated that, "Rezaian is the victim of a power struggle between different government factions. He is being used by a regime which, since 1979, has often exchanged foreign detainees (or those with dual nationality) for Iranian agents held in other countries." RWB also revealed that it found the evidence cited in the written indictment consisted solely of Rezaian's personal and professional emails, from which phrases had been taken out of context.

=== Campaigns for his release ===
There were several international campaigns for his release. His case was a centerpiece of the Press Uncuffed campaign by Dana Priest and her students at the Philip Merrill School of Journalism at the University of Maryland in collaboration with the Committee to Protect Journalists. Rezaian's wife and mother wore Press Uncuffed bracelets during a visit to the prison where Rezaian was being held. Ali Rezaian, Jason's brother, led a Change.org petition that more than 530,000 people from around the world signed; he and a group of supporters hand delivered it to the Iranian consulate on December 3, 2015.

=== International Government ===
- Iran: On August 6, 2014, Deputy Foreign Minister Hassan Ghashghavi said the arrests were a "domestic issue and not a matter for the United States". He stated, "We do not accept dual nationalities. If a person enters Iran with an Iranian passport, that person is considered an Iranian citizen."
- UN: On September 19, 2014, Secretary-General Ban Ki-moon said he had directly appealed to Iranian officials to release Rezaian and his wife.
- United States: On July 28, 2014, State Department spokeswoman Jen Psaki said: "We call on the Iranian government to immediately release Mr. Rezaian and the other three individuals."

==== United States Senate ====
On May 11, 2015, the United States Senate called for the release of Rezaian in a 90-0 vote. There were ten senators who did not vote.

This measure has not been amended since it was introduced. The summary of that version is repeated below:

States that it is "U.S. policy that: (1) the government of the Islamic Republic of Iran should immediately release Saeed Abedini, Amir Hekmati, and Jason Rezaian, and cooperate with the U.S. government to locate and return Robert Levinson; and (2) the U.S. government should undertake every effort using every diplomatic tool at its disposal to secure their release.

== Release ==
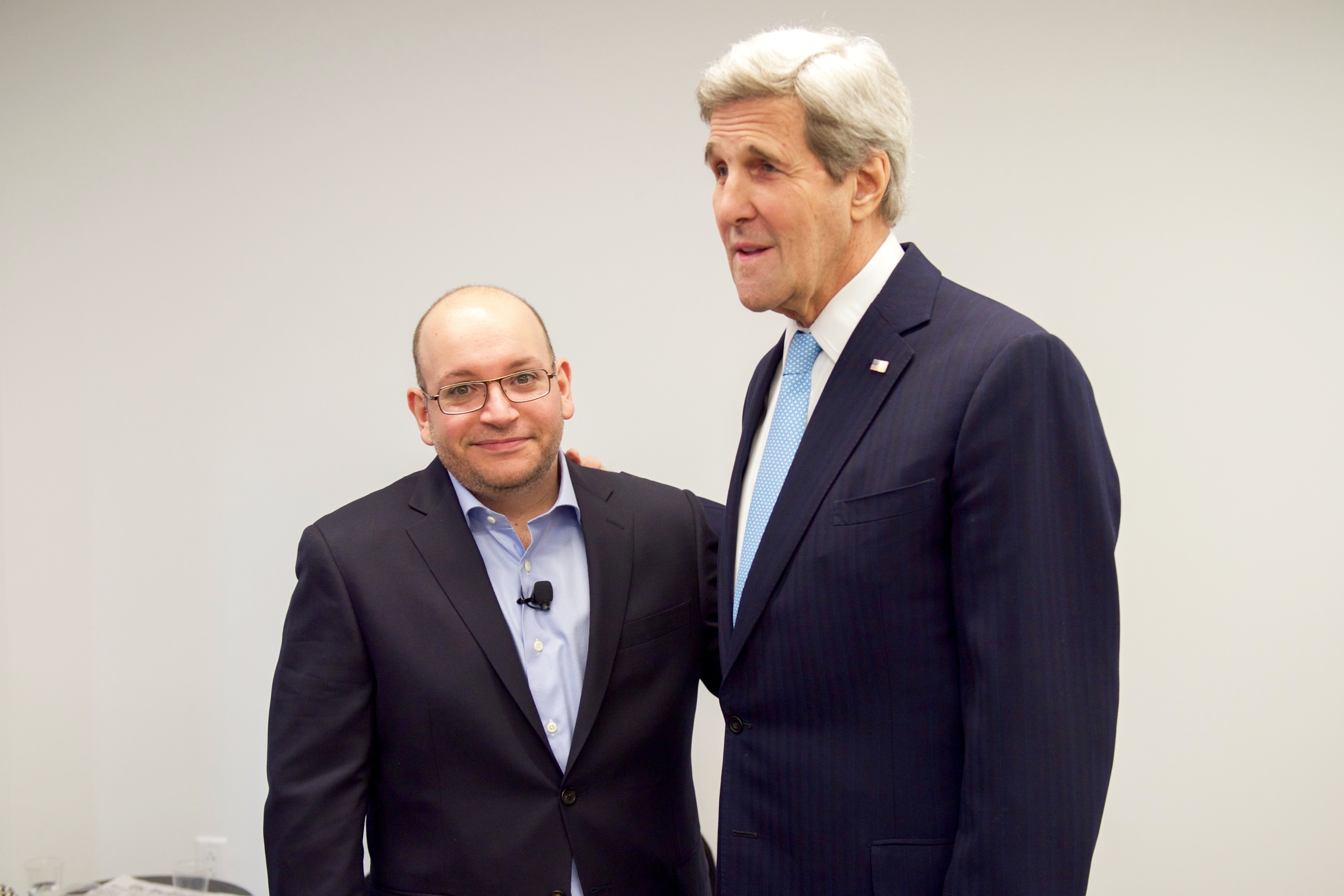
John Kerry and Jason Rezaian

On January 16, 2016, it was announced that Rezaian had been released from Iran along with three other United States prisoners in exchange of the release of seven Iranian prisoners and the dropping of charges against fourteen other Iranians. On the same day of his release, America released $1.7 billion in frozen Iranian accounts.

== See also ==
- 2013–2015 detention of Al Jazeera journalists by Egypt
- Committee to Protect Journalists
- List of foreign nationals detained in Iran
- Maziar Bahari
