= Iranian Construction Engineering Organization =

Iranian Construction Engineering Organization (full name: Construction Engineering System Organization) is the Iranian organization that issues work permits and grades and records for building architects, structural engineers, mechanical and electrical building services, town planners, surveyor engineers, and traffic engineers. It was created in 1978. It works with Construction industries, Municipality and Minister of Road and Urban Development programming and planning for Iranian cities.

It supervises buildings demolitions operations.

It has been criticized for being bureaucratic.

In the new process it selects observers, control, engineers for buildings.

== Licenses ==
It issues concrete pouring works permits to mixers.
