= Ali Noorzad (politician) =

Iranian professor and politician

- Born: 1960 (age 65–66); Amol, Iran
- Education: Concordia University
- Known for: Deputy Minister of Roads and Urban Development of Iran; CEO of Iran Transportation Infrastructure Construction and Development Company
- Scientific career
- Fields: Geotechnical engineering
- Workplaces: Ministry of Roads and Urban Development; Ministry of Petroleum

Ali Noorzad (Persian: علی نورزاد, born 1960) is an Iranian university professor and politician. He earned his doctorate in Geotechnical engineering from Concordia University, Canada, in 1998. He is active in water and soil issues and huge dam construction projects. From 2013 to 2017, he was the Deputy Minister of Roads and Urban Development of Iran.
