= Mahmoud Abu Zeid =

Egyptian photojournalist

Mahmoud Abou Zeid
- Mahmoud Abou Zeid
- Born: 1987 (age 38–39); Kuwait
- Other name: Shawkan
- Occupation: Freelance photojournalist
- Known for: Photos of protests in Cairo
- Awards: John Aubuchon Press Freedom Award 2016. CPJ's 2016 International Press Freedom Awards. UNESCO/Guillermo Cano Press Freedom Prize 2018.

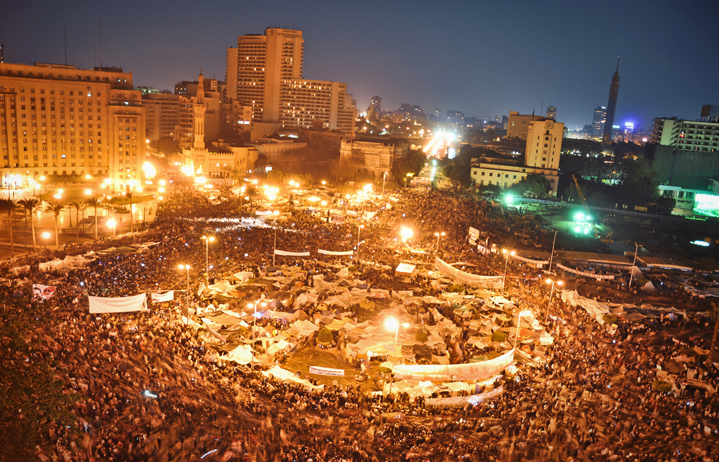
A picture taken by Zeid of Tahir Square in Cairo during the Egyptian protests.

Mahmoud Abu Zeid (Arabic: محمود أبو زيد; born c. 1987), also known as Shawkan (شوكان), is an Egyptian photojournalist who was arrested for taking photos of the Rabaa massacre in Cairo, Egypt and imprisoned during the post-coup unrest by the Egyptian government since 2013, where he faced the death penalty. By September 2018 he had been sentenced to a five-year prison term and was expected to be released shortly thereafter; he was released on 4 March 2019.

== Personal life ==
In 2016 Zeid had Hepatitis C, which he was diagnosed with while in prison. He was also diagnosed with malnourishment, anemia, and depression, as well as lacking proper medical care.

== Career ==
Zeid is a freelance photojournalist. He started working for Demotix in April 2010. In the wake of the 2013 Egyptian coup d'état, Zeid took photographs of protests against General Abdel Fattah el-Sisi. His work has been published in Time, The Sun, Die Zeit, Bild and on the BBC website. His work has also been reproduced by Amnesty International, Global Voices, IFEX, Index on Censorship and Open Democracy.

== Arrest ==
Zeid was arrested along with two other journalists while he was taking pictures of the 14 August 2013 Rabaa massacre.

The two other non-Egyptian journalists were released but Shawkan remained in prison for more than two years without charges. His case, along with 700 other defendants, is known as the "Rabaa sit-in dispersal". Shawkan's camera has not been used as evidence he is a photojournalist, which makes his status as a prisoner ambiguous.

By November 2015, he had been in "pre-trial detention for over two years". On 26 March 2016, he was charged with six offences, and, as a result, faced the death penalty.

On 8 September, an Egyptian court handed him a 5-year jail sentence which could see him leave prison "within a few days," said his lawyer Karim Abdelrady. Abdelrady added that the sentence was nevertheless "unfair because he (Shawkan) was only doing his job".

Shawkan was released early on 4 March 2019, 6 years after he was arrested, however as part of his sentencing, he had to spend his probation in Al Haram police station between the hours of 6pm and 6am every day for the next five years till his complete release on August 14, 2023.

=== Context ===
Egypt was in 2015 among the top ten countries of world in the imprisonment of journalists with 12. Shawkan is being held in Egypt's Tora Prison. As of end of 2015, China had the largest number of imprisoned journalists for the past two years with the number of 49 journalists.

=== Reactions ===
There is an international campaign for Shawkan's release using the hashtag #FreeShawkan and several press freedom organizations including the Rory Peck Trust and the Committee to Protect Journalists have called for his release, while Amnesty International has started an online petition for it. In February 2015, the Committee to Protect Journalists met with officials in Egypt to call for his release. Shawkan is a featured case in the Press Uncuffed campaign, led by Dana Priest and her students at the Phillip Merrill College of Journalism in collaboration with the Committee to Protect Journalists to help free imprisoned journalists throughout the world by selling bracelets bearing their names and raising awareness about their cases. In 2016 the Committee to Protect Journalists organized an exhibit of Shawkan's work at the Bronx Documentary Center.

In 2018, UNESCO awarded Press Freedom Prize for his contributions and marked its detention as Human Rights abuse.

According to Jason Stern, a senior Middle East and North Africa research associate for the CPJ, Shawkan should have never been arrested for performing his job duties. In a letter published by news outlets such as National Public Radio and Deutsche Welle, as well as human rights groups, Shawkan wrote about how journalism in Egypt has become a crime. There are 13 journalists who are facing a life sentence or death.

Shawkan's brother, Mohammed, spoke on his brother's imprisonment, "For a year, my brother is being held without charges in prison, he was detained during the dispersal of Rabaa and his detention has been renewed since then. My brother never held a gun, he was simply doing his job, but unfortunately he was a freelancer, so he had no institution to back him or offer any support."

== Exhibits ==
- "The Price of Photography: Shawkan, 1,000+ Days Behind Bars," at the Bronx Documentary Center.

== Awards ==
- 2016, John Aubuchon Press Freedom Award. A statement from the National Press Club said, "Shawkan's case exemplifies the draconian way Egyptian authorities have cracked down on the press. Egypt is one of the world’s top jailers of news professionals, and the situation there is not improving."
- 2016, International Press Freedom Award, from the Committee to Protect Journalists.
- 2018, UNESCO/Guillermo Cano Press Freedom Prize. The UN Working Group on Arbitrary Detentions has qualified his arrest and detention as arbitrary and contrary to the rights and freedoms guaranteed by the Universal Declaration of Human Rights and the International Covenant on Civil and Political Rights. “The choice of Mahmoud Abu Zeid pays tribute to his courage, resistance and commitment to freedom of expression,” said Maria Ressa, President of the Jury. https://en.unesco.org/news/egyptian-photojournalist-mahmoud-abu-zeid-aka-shawkan-receive-2018-unescoguillermo-cano-press

== Foundations ==
The Free Shawkan Foundation was founded by Shawkan’s lifelong best friend Ahmed Abu Seif in the United States to advocate for Shawkan and other imprisoned journalists worldwide.

== See also ==
- Human rights in Egypt
