= Hamid Behbahani =

Iranian academic and politician (1941–2024)

- حمید بهبهانی

Minister of Roads and Transportation
- In office 5 August 2008 – 1 February 2011
- President: Mahmoud Ahmadinejad
- Preceded by: Mohammad Rahmati
- Succeeded by: Ali Nikzad (Acting)

Personal details
- Born: 14 January 1941 Shiraz, Iran
- Died: 9 March 2024 (aged 83)

Hamid Behbahani (Persian: حمید بهبهانی, 14 January 1941 – 9 March 2024) was an Iranian academic and politician who served as minister of roads and transportation from 5 August 2008 to 1 February 2011 when he was impeached by the Parliament of Iran.

== Early life and education ==
Behbahani held a BS in civil engineering from Iran University of Science and Technology and a M.S. and Ph.D. from the University of Florida.

== Career ==
Behbahani was the head of the civil engineering department at Iran University of Science and Technology. He was appointed by Mahmoud Ahmadinejad as an advisor for transportation affairs. He was also a member of high council of state for reform plan. After the resignation of Mohammad Rahmati from office as minister of transportation on 18 June 2008, Ahmadinejad assigned Behbahani as his candidate for the ministry to the Parliament. He received 181 out of 271 votes of the MPs and became minister of roads and transportation. He continued to serve in the same post in the second cabinet of Ahmadinejad after he was elected as president in 2009.

=== Impeachment ===
On 1 February 2011, 147 out of 234 Members of Parliament gave a vote of no confidence to Behbahani and impeached him for falsely claiming to hold a doctoral degree. He is the second minister to be impeached by the Parliament after Ali Kordan who was impeached in 2008.

=== Connection with Ahmadinejad ===
Behbahani was the supervisor of Ahmadinejad during his PhD studies at Iran University of Science and Technology where he was involved in a plagiarism scandal. In 2009, Nature's investigation suggested that the paper 'Providing a decreasing connection probability model for urban street network' (published in the journal Transport in 2006) co-authored by Hassan Ziari, Behbahani and a PhD candidate named Mohammed Khabiri, "contains large amounts of text from earlier articles by other researchers", considered plagiarism.

== Death ==
Behbahani died on 9 March 2024, at the age of 83.

Political offices
Preceded by Mohammad Rahmati	Minister of Transportation; 2008–2011	Succeeded by Ali Nikzad (acting)
