= Ali Abdolalizadeh =

Iranian reformist politician

- علی عبدالعلی‌زاده
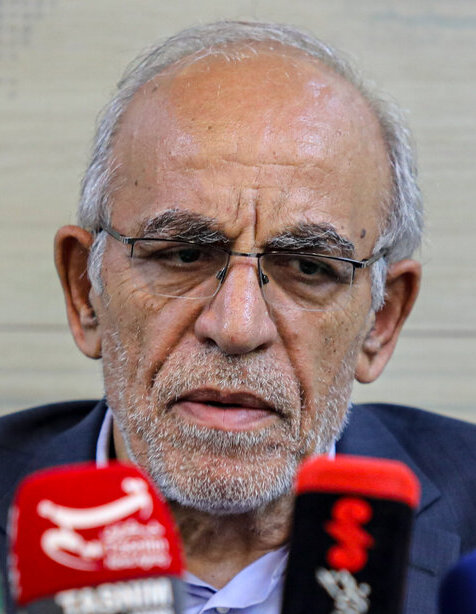
- Abdolalizadeh in 2024

Minister of Housing and Urban Development
- In office 20 August 1997 – 24 August 2005
- President: Mohammad Khatami
- Preceded by: Abbas Ahmad Akhoundi
- Succeeded by: Mohammad Saeedikia

Governor of East Azerbaijan
- In office 20 August 1992 – 19 August 1997
- Preceded by: Akbar Parhizgar
- Succeeded by: Yahya Mohammadzadeh

Member of the Parliament of Iran
- In office 28 May 1984 – 28 May 1992
- Constituency: Urmia
- Majority: 94,509 (51%)

Personal details
- Born: 1955 (age 70–71) Urmia, Iran
- Party: Executives of Construction Party
- Education: University of Tabriz
- Profession: Civil engineer

Ali Abdolalizadeh (Persian: علی عبدالعلی‌زاده) is an Iranian reformist politician who held office as the Minister of Housing and Urban Development under President Mohammad Khatami.

He represented his hometown Urmia in the Iranian Parliament from 1984 to 1992 and East Azerbaijan Province from 1992 to 1997.
