= Mohammad Eslami =

Iranian politician (born 1956)

- محمد اسلامی
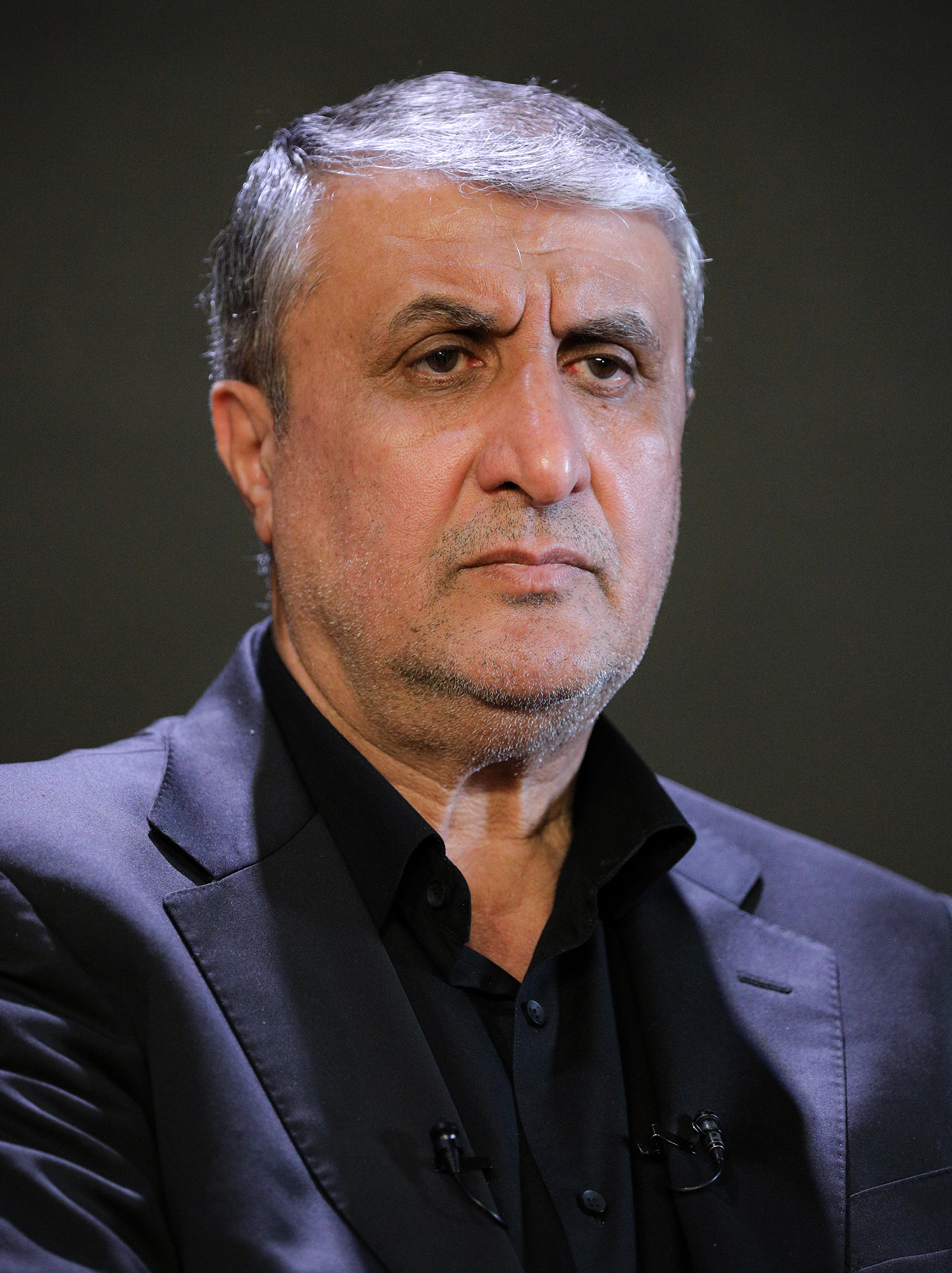
- Eslami in 2024

7th Head of the Atomic Energy Organization
- Incumbent
- Assumed office 29 August 2021
- President: Ebrahim Raisi; Mohammad Mokhber (acting); Masoud Pezeshkian
- Preceded by: Ali Akbar Salehi

3rd Minister of Roads and Urban Development
- In office 27 October 2018 – 25 August 2021; Acting: 20–27 October 2018
- President: Hassan Rouhani
- Preceded by: Abbas Ahmad Akhoundi
- Succeeded by: Rostam Ghasemi

Governor-general of Mazandaran
- In office 29 October 2017 – 20 October 2018
- President: Hassan Rouhani
- Preceded by: Rabi Fallah Jelodar
- Succeeded by: Ahmad Hosseinzadegan

Personal details
- Born: 23 September 1956 (age 70) Isfahan, Iran
- Education: University of Detroit Mercy; Ohio University; Royal Roads University; Sharif University of Technology

Mohammad Eslami (Persian: محمد اسلامی; born 23 September 1956) is an Iranian politician serving as Vice President for Nuclear Affairs and head of the Atomic Energy Organization of Iran. He was appointed to the position under President Ebrahim Raisi and was reappointed in 2024 by President Masoud Pezeshkian. He previously served in the government of President Hassan Rouhani as Minister of Roads and Urban development and Governor of Mazandaran province.

In 2008, the United Nations sanctioned Eslami, then head of Iran's Defense Industries Training and Research Institute, for involvement in Iran's nuclear program and the development of nuclear weapon delivery systems.

== See also ==
- List of Iranian officials
