= Ali Nikzad =

Iranian politician and academic

- علی نیکزاد
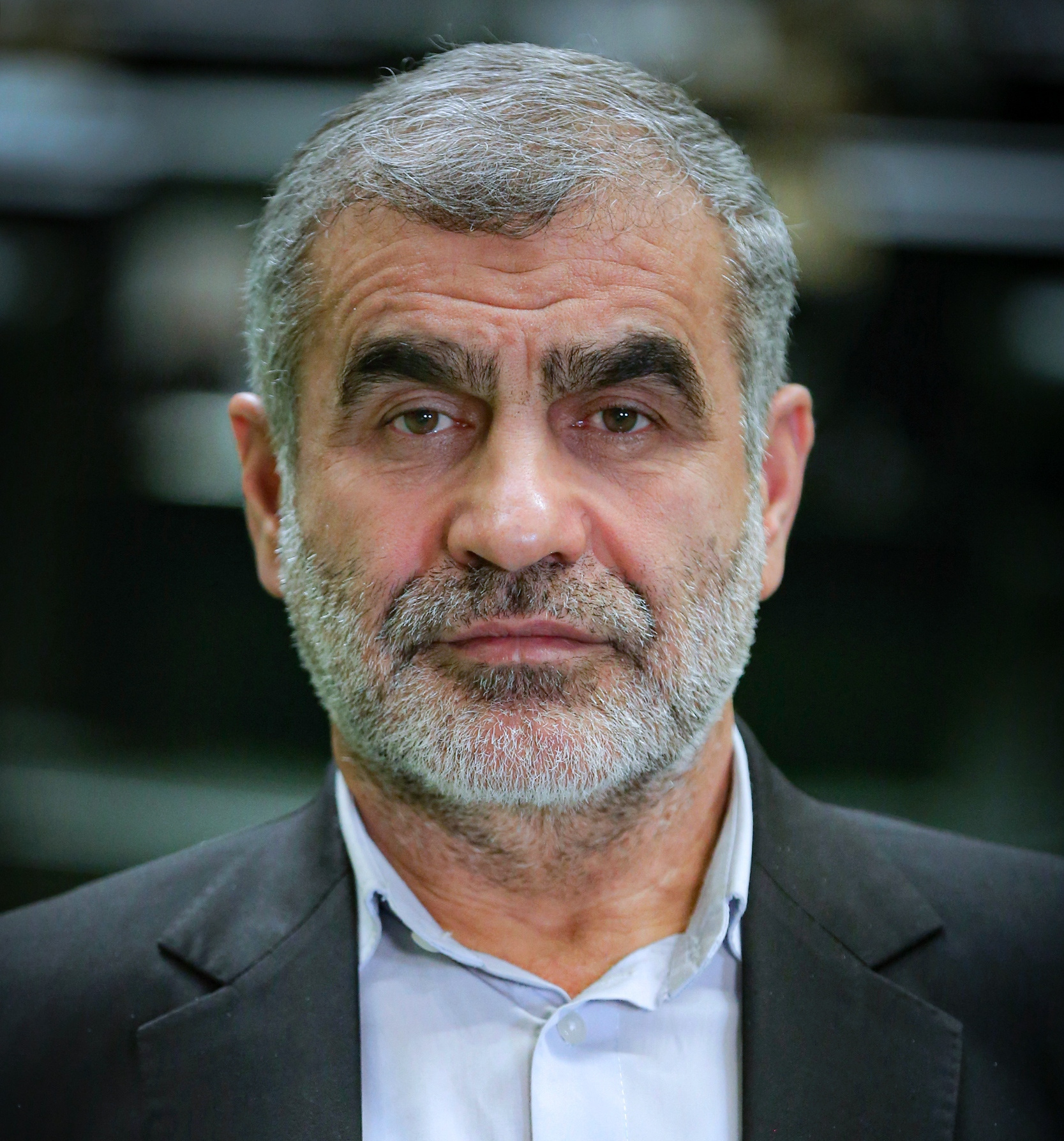
- Nikzad in 2022

Member of the Parliament of Iran
- Incumbent
- Assumed office 27 May 2020
- Constituency: Ardabil, Nir, Namin and Sareyn

Minister of Roads and Urban Development
- In office 27 June 2011 – 15 August 2013
- President: Mahmoud Ahmadinejad
- Preceded by: Office established
- Succeeded by: Abbas Ahmad Akhoundi

Minister of Housing and Urban Development
- In office 3 September 2009 – 27 June 2011
- President: Mahmoud Ahmadinejad
- Preceded by: Mohammad Saeedikia
- Succeeded by: Himself (Transportation and Housing)

Minister of Information and Communications Technology Acting
- In office 2 December 2012 – 2 February 2013
- President: Mahmoud Ahmadinejad
- Preceded by: Reza Taghipour
- Succeeded by: Hassan Nami

Minister of Roads and Transportation Acting
- In office 7 February 2011 – 27 June 2011
- President: Mahmoud Ahmadinejad
- Preceded by: Hamid Behbahani
- Succeeded by: Himself (Transportation and Housing)

Governor of Ardabil Province
- In office 26 October 2005 – 20 December 2008
- Preceded by: Javad Negharandeh
- Succeeded by: Mansour Haghighatpour

Personal details
- Born: 1961 (age 64–65) Ardabil, Iran
- Education: Iran University of Science and Technology
- Awards: Order of Construction (1st class)

Ali Nikzad (Persian: علی نیکزاد; born 1961) is an Iranian conservative politician and a member of Iranian parliament. He is an academic and a former cabinet minister.

== Early life and education ==
Nikzad was born in 1961. He holds a bachelor's degree in urban development from the University of Elm-va-san'at (Science and Industry). Then he received his master's degree in public management from Industrial Management University. Akbar Nikzad his brother is an Iranian politician and the former Governor of Ardabil Province.

== Career ==
Nikzad was appointed governor of Ardabil Province in 2005. He then was the director of the municipalities organization at the ministry of interior until 2009. He served as the minister of transportation and housing from August 2009 to June 2011. He was also acting minister of roads and transportation from February to June 2011. As minister of housing, he replaced Mohammad Saeedikia after President Mahmoud Ahmadinejad was reelected.

On 7 February 2011, Nikzad was appointed by Ahmadinejad as acting minister of roads and transportation to succeed former dismissed Minister Hamid Behbahani. Nikzad was appointed minister of infrastructural affairs in May 2011 when the ministry was created, combining the two ministries of housing and urban development and road and transportation. At the end of 2012, he was also appointed acting minister of communications and information technology. President Ahmedinejad proposed him as minister for the post in January 2013. However, he was not approved by the Majlis.

He announced his candidacy for the 2013 presidential election. However, he later declined his candidacy. In June 2013, Nikzad was nominated as a candidate for Tehran mayor. The "Viva Spring" group consisting of Ahmedinejad's allies could not win the local elections that was also held on 14 June 2013 as the presidential election. Therefore, Nikzad's election as Tehran mayor became unlikely. In 2017 election, he was appointed campaign chairman of presidential candidate Ebrahim Raisi.

Political offices
Preceded by Mohammad Saeedikia	Minister of Housing; 2009–2011	Succeeded by Himself
Preceded by Hamid Behbahani	Minister of Transportation; 2011	Succeeded by Himself
Preceded by Himself	Minister of Transportation and Housing; 2011–2013	Succeeded by Abbas Ahmad Akhondi
Preceded by Reza Taghipour	Minister of Information and Communications Technology; 2012–2013	Succeeded by Hassan Nami
Assembly seats
Preceded by Abdolreza Mesri	2nd Vice Speaker of Parliament of Iran; 2020–2021	Succeeded by Abdolreza Mesri
Preceded by Amir-Hossein Ghazizadeh Hashemi	1st Vice Speaker of Parliament of Iran; 2021–present	Incumbent
