= Prisoner: My 544 Days in an Iranian Prison =

2019 memoir on Iranian imprisonment

- Cover of the 2019 HarperCollins edition
- Author: Jason Rezaian
- Language: English
- Publication date: 2019

Prisoner: My 544 Days in an Iranian Prison is a 2019 memoir by Jason Rezaian, recounting his detention in Iran’s Evin Prison from 2014 to 2016. The book describes his arrest, interrogation, trial, and eventual release. He describes his personal experience within the broader context of U.S.–Iran relations.

== Background ==
Jason Rezaian was the Tehran bureau chief for The Washington Post when he and his wife, Yeganeh Salehi, were arrested in July 2014 in their Tehran apartment.

At the time, Iran was in the midst of nuclear negotiations with the United States. Rezaian concluded that his detention was used by the Iranian government as leverage during the talks in an act of hostage diplomacy.

== Content ==
In Prisoner, Rezaian recounts the circumstances leading to his imprisonment and describes being held in solitary confinement for 47 nights by agents of the Islamic Revolutionary Guard Corps. Throughout his detention, he was interrogated about his journalistic work. He describes his trial is described as a "sham": initially accused of espionage, he was later charged with "propaganda".

He also reflects on the psychological impact of his captivity, including nightmares, memory problems, and emotional disorientation. He describes the diplomatic intervention that led to his release from Iran.

== Reception ==
Prisoner received positive reviews, with critics praising its combination of personal narrative and dark humour. In The Washington Post, James Mann noted Rezaian's "descriptions of the way the Iranian regime operates at the working level — its twisted logic and paranoia — that make the book so worthwhile.”
