= Abolghasem Mozaffari =

Iranian military person (born 1967)

Abolghasem Mozaffari Shams
- Born: July 2, 1956 (age 70); Tehran, Iran
- Military career
- Allegiance: Iran
- Branch: IRGC
- Service years: 1988 –
- Commands: Commander of the Khatam Anbia Troops

Abolghasem Mozaffari Shams (Persian: ابوالقاسم مظفری شمس, born 2 July 1956 in Tehran) is an Iranian military person and engineer who is Head of Khatam al-Anbiya Construction Headquarters in the Revolutionary Guard Corps since 7 August 2011.

He is a member of Sepah since April 1988. Before his appointment as head of Khatam Anbia Troops, he was head of Water and Power Development Company and Chairman of Tunnel Development Center.

Military offices
Preceded by Rostam Ghasemi	Commander of Khatam al-Anbiya Construction Headquarters; 2011-present	Incumbent
