= Press Uncuffed =

Campaign to help free imprisoned journalists

Press Uncuffed, founded in 2015 by the Washington Post's Dana Priest and several of her students at the University of Maryland in collaboration with the Committee to Protect Journalists, is a campaign to help free imprisoned journalists throughout the world. The nonprofit organization centers fundraising around selling bracelets bearing the names of imprisoned journalists. Eight of the journalists profiled were released, including the Washington Post journalist Jason Rezaian. Priest and the students used Indiegogo to fund the original bracelets. They surpassed their flexible goal of $30,000 by almost $1,500 within the time limit of the campaign. The organization's mission statement is: "Our mission is to advocate for and support imprisoned journalists overseas. If a journalist somewhere still wears a cuff, so will we." The campaign was launched at the Newseum in 2015.

== Dana Priest ==
A two-time Pulitzer Prize winning Washington Post investigative reporter, Dana Priest covers national security and press freedom worldwide. At the university, Priest teaches two courses: National Security and Press Freedom Reporting, and The Impact of 9/11 on Journalism and Civic Life. The former is the course with which she began Press Uncuffed. At the beginning of the semester, each student was assigned to an imprisoned journalist somewhere in the world. Throughout the semester, the student investigated, researched and reported on the journalist. Many students were able to call, video chat, and send messages to their journalists. By the end of the semester, students completed a long-form article to be published in either Capital News Service or the Washington Post, where Priest works. One story published in the Post covered Zainab Khawaja in Bahrain. A story about Pakistan's famous television show host Hamid Mir was also published in the Post.

== Bracelets ==
Clear bracelets depicting the names of imprisoned journalists along with the countries in which they are imprisoned are the main source of funding for Press Uncuffed. The organization sells them through their website and through Investigative Reporters and Editors, a non-profit organization that works to improve investigative journalism worldwide.

== Social Media and Coverage ==
The organization is active on multiple social media platforms, including Facebook, Twitter, Instagram and Tumblr. The organization put together a video the first year detailing their work and goals.

At the University of Maryland, the organization has received extensive coverage. The Writers' Bloc, a student publication, covered the organization's mission. The university's student newspaper, The Diamondback, covered the nonprofit's win of the Do Good Challenge. Other universities have also covered the nonprofit's work, including the University of Arizona, where Priest won an award for her press freedom efforts in 2016. Priest has expressed an interest in working with the university to further their press freedom goals.

== Awards ==
The campaign is the winner of multiple awards, including the SABRE Award for nonprofit organizations and the Do Good Challenge, which they won alongside Student's Helping Honduras.
