= Abbas Ahmad Akhoundi =

Iranian politician

Abbas Akhoundi
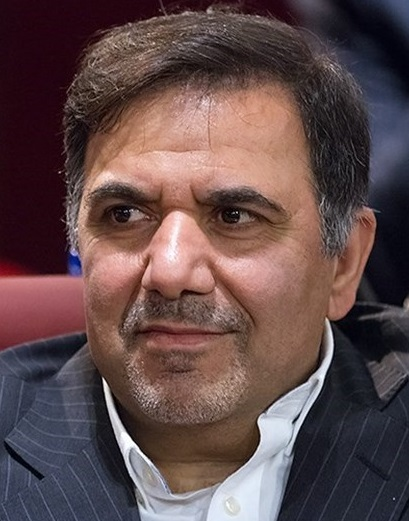

2nd Minister of Roads and Urban Development
- In office 15 August 2013 – 20 October 2018
- President: Hassan Rouhani
- Preceded by: Ali Nikzad
- Succeeded by: Mohammad Eslami

13th Minister of Housing
- In office 16 August 1993 – 20 August 1997
- President: Akbar Hashemi Rafsanjani
- Preceded by: Serajedin Kazerooni
- Succeeded by: Ali Abdolalizadeh

Personal details
- Born: 6 June 1957 (age 69) Najaf, Iraq
- Spouse: Bano Rasoli Mahalati
- Children: 3
- Relatives: Ali Akbar Nategh-Nouri (brother-in-law); Mohammad-Ali Shahidi (brother-in-law)
- Education: Royal Holloway, University of London (PhD); Tehran University

Abbas Ahmad Akhoundi (Persian: عباس آخوندی, born 6 June 1957) is an Iranian politician and academic and former Minister of Roads and Urban Development, from 2013 to 2018. In 1993, Akhoundi became the Minister of Housing and Urban Development, making him one of the youngest ministers in Iran's modern history until Mohammad-Javad Azari Jahromi's appointment in 2017.

== Early life and education ==
The grandson of Grand Ayatollah Allameh Amini, Akhoundi was born in Najaf where his grandfather resided. Along with other Iranian families, he was deported from Iraq in the 1970s. He is also the brother-in-law of Ali Akbar Nategh Nouri. Akhoundi acquired his BEng and MSc from University of Tehran in Civil Engineering. He obtained a PhD in Political Economy from Royal Holloway, University of London in 2006. His thesis was titled Globalization, the nation-state and national economic policy making : the attitudes of Iran's elites.

== Political career ==
Akhoundi is also widely accredited for drafting Iran's privatization bill known as Article 44 of the constitution. In 2011, he wrote a set of advised amendments to Article 44 published by Chamber of Commerce Industries and Mines, none of which have been implemented. During his time as the minister he founded the Construction Engineering Organization, the NGO responsible for the standardization of construction in Iran. Akhoundi served as Minister of Housing and Urban Development from 1993 to 1997 in the cabinet of Akbar Hashemi Rafsanjani.

He was chosen for the ministry of Roads and Urban Development by the newly elected President Hassan Rouhani, he needed to gain a vote of confidence from the Iranian Parliament before taking office. He was approved to take office on 15 August winning 159 from a possible 284 votes. He was also Head of the Iranian Housing Fund Charity for 8 years.

=== Views ===
Akhoundi maintains economically liberal views and is politically a reformer. He supported Mir-Hossein Mousavi for president in 2009 and was an important figure in his campaign.
