= List of Iranian ambassadors under President Khatami =

This is a List of Iranian ambassadors under President Khatami:

- Hamid Aboutalebi, Ambassador to Australia
- Ali Ahani, Ambassador to Belgium
- Mohammad Hossein Adeli, Ambassador to the United Kingdom
- Mohammad Mehdi Akhoond Zadeh, Ambassador to Austria
- Masoud Edrisi, Ambassador to the Lebanon
- Pirouz Hosseini, Representative and Ambassador to the International Atomic Energy Agency
- Abdol Reza Faraji-rad, Ambassador to Norway
- Mohammad Javad Faridzadeh, Ambassador to the Holy See
- Ali Jazini, Representative to the Interests Section of the Islamic Republic of Iran in the United States
- Javad Kajouyan Fini, Ambassador to Finland
- Hassan Tajik, Ambassador to Portugal
- Hossein Kamalian, Ambassador to Yemen
- Sadegh Kharazi, Ambassador to France
- Mohammad Keshavarzzadeh, Ambassador to Venezuela
- Morteza Mir-Heydari, Ambassador to Serbia and montenegro
- Hamidreza Nikkar Esfahani, Ambassador to Ireland
- Mohammad Ghasem Mohebali, Ambassador to Malaysia
- Esfandiar Omidbakhsh, Representative to the World Trade Organization
- Mohsen Pakaein, Ambassador to the Kingdom of Thailand
- Abolfazl Rahnama Hazavei, Ambassador to Hungary
- Hossein Sadeghi, Ambassador to Saudi Arabia
- Gholamreza Ansari, Ambassador to Russia
- Hossein Talaei, Ambassador to South Korea
- Abbas Talebi-far, Ambassador to Brunei
- Seyed Kamal Sajjadi, Ambassador to Vietnam
- Muhammad Hassan Akhtari, Ambassador to Syria
- Abdollah Norouzi, Ambassador to Sweden
- Fereydoun Verdinezhad, Ambassador to China
- Siavash Zargar Yaghoubi, Ambassador to India
- M. Javad Zarif, Representative and Ambassador to the United Nations
- Bozorgmehr Ziaran, Ambassador to Netherlands
- Ahmad Daniali, Ambassador to Denmark
- Amir Hossein Zamaninia, Ambassador to Malaysia
- Osawe Ahmed Reza, Ambassador to Nigeria
