= Farzaneh Sadegh =

Iranian architect and politician

- فرزانه صادق
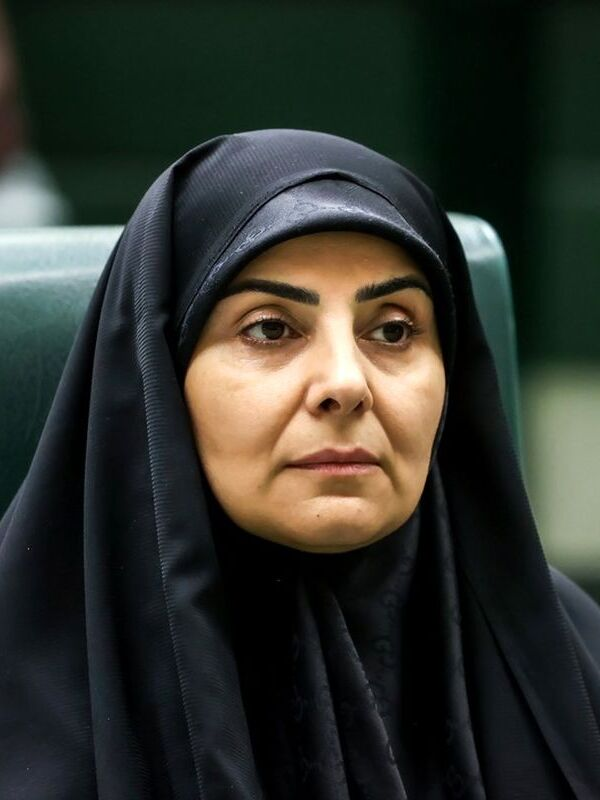
- Sadegh in 2024

6th Minister of Roads and Urban Development
- Incumbent
- Assumed office 21 August 2024
- President: Masoud Pezeshkian
- Preceded by: Mehrdad Bazrpash

Personal details
- Born: 12 September 1976 (age 50) Hamadan, Imperial State of Iran
- Children: 1
- Education: University of Tehran; Islamic Azad University
- Occupation: architect; executive director

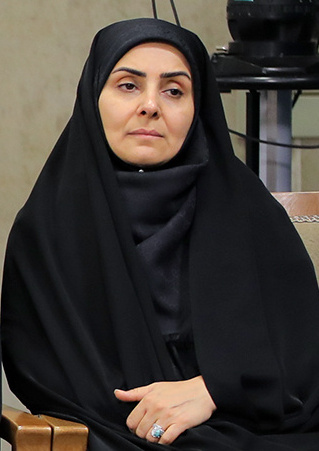
Sadegh at a meeting with Ali Khamenei

Farzaneh Sadegh Malvajerd (Persian: فرزانه صادق مالواجرد; born 12 September 1976) is an Iranian architect, urban planner and executive director who has been working as the Minister of Roads and Urban Development in Iran since 2024.

Farzaneh Sadegh previously worked as the secretary of the Supreme Council of Urban Planning and Architecture of Iran and the deputy of architecture and urban development of the Ministry of Roads and Urban Development in this ministry. She is the second woman to become a minister of Iran after the Iranian Revolution and the first woman to be the Minister of Roads and Urban Development in Iran.
