= Vatan-e-Emrooz =

Persian-language newspaper in Iran

Vatan-e Emrooz (Persian: وطن امروز lit. "Homeland Today") is a full-color daily Persian-language newspaper managed by Mehrdad Bazrpash (an ally of former president Mahmoud Ahmadinejad and former head of the student Basij organization branch at Sharif University of Technology). It began publication just before the Iranian presidential election in 2009. The newspaper belongs to conservative parties and was a supporter of Ahmadinejad. There are claims that the newspaper is using government-owned companies as sources of financial support.

Sports journalist Hossein Javadi was among the victims on 24 March 2015, of the Germanwings Flight 9525, which crashed in Prads-Haute-Bléone, Alpes-de-Haute-Provence, France.
