= Mehrdad Bazrpash =

Iranian politician

- مهرداد بذرپاش
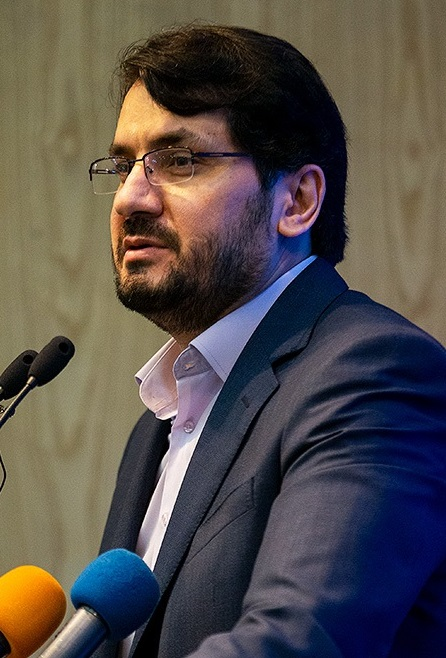
- Bazrpash in 2020

5th Minister of Roads and Urban Development
- In office 7 December 2022 – 21 August 2024
- President: Ebrahim Raisi; Mohammad Mokhber (acting)
- Preceded by: Rostam Ghasemi
- Succeeded by: Farzaneh Sadegh

President of the Supreme Audit Court
- In office 22 July 2020 – 10 December 2022
- Preceded by: Adel Azar
- Succeeded by: Ahmad-Reza Dastghib

Member of the Islamic Consultative Assembly
- In office 28 May 2012 – 28 May 2016
- Constituency: Tehran, Rey, Shemiranat and Eslamshahr
- Majority: 271,771 (24.12%)

Vice President of Iran Head of National Youth Organization
- In office 24 July 2009 – 28 November 2010
- President: Mahmoud Ahmadinejad
- Preceded by: Javad Haji Aliakbari
- Succeeded by: Farahnaz Torkestani

Advisor to the President of Iran
- In office 28 November 2010 – 28 May 2012
- President: Mahmoud Ahmadinejad
- In office 18 August 2005 – 17 October 2006
- President: Mahmoud Ahmadinejad

Personal details
- Born: Mehrdad Bazrpash c. 1980 (age 45–46) Tehran, Iran
- Party: Stability Front
- Other political affiliations: Pleasant Scent of Servitude
- Education: Allameh Tabatabaei University; Sharif University of Technology
- Website: bazrpash.ir

Mehrdad Bazrpash (Persian: مهرداد بذرپاش; born c. 1980) is an Iranian principlist politician, and the former Minister of Roads and Urban Development from 2022 to 2024. He was also the President of the Supreme Audit Court from 2020 to 2022.

He was formerly member of Iran Parliament and CEO of two largest Iran's automakers SAIPA and Pars Khodro in 2000s and served as Iran's Vice President and head of Iran's National Youth Organization. He was the owner of newspaper Vatan-e-Emrooz.

== Electoral history ==
Year	Election	Votes	%	Rank	Notes
2006	City Council of Tehran	150,088	9.06	23rd	Lost
2012	Parliament Round 1	357,145	15.29	21st	Went to Round 2
2012	Parliament Round 2	▼271,771	▲24.12	21st	Won
2016	Parliament	▲777,871	▼23.95	37th	Lost
