= Qaleh Sargah =

Qaleh Sargah قلعه سرگاه
- Village
- Location within Iran
- Coordinates: 27°43′52″N 52°37′45″E
- Country: Iran
- Province: Fars
- County: Mohr
- Bakhsh: Asir
- Rural District: Dasht-e Laleh

Population (2006)
  - Total: 373
- Time zone: UTC+3:30 (IRST)
  - Summer (DST): UTC+4:30 (IRDT)

Qaleh Sargah (Persian: قلعه سرگاه, also Romanized as Qal‘eh Sargāh and Qal‘eh-ye Sargāh; also known as Qal‘eh-ye Saga, Qal eh-ye Sarkeh, and Sargāh) is a village in Dasht-e Laleh Rural District, Asir District, Mohr County, Fars province, Iran. At the 2006 census, its population was 373, in 70 families.
