= Ministry of Roads and Urban Development =

Government ministry of Iran

- وزارت راه و شهرسازی; Vezārat-e Rāh va Shahrsāzi

Agency overview
- Formed: 27 June 2011
- Preceding agencies: Ministry of Housing and Urban Development; Ministry of Roads and Transportation
- Jurisdiction: Government of the Islamic Republic of Iran
- Headquarters: Tehran, Iran
- Employees: 46,476 (2019)
- Minister responsible: Farzaneh Sadegh
- Website: https://www.mrud.ir/en

The Ministry of Roads and Urban Development (Persian: وزارت راه و شهرسازی, Vezārat-e Rāh va Shahrsāzi) is an Iranian government body in charge of providing and regulating the country's transport infrastructure (including roads, railroads, shipping lanes and airways), as well as setting policies for the housing sector and construction industry. This ministry was formed on 27 June 2011, when the two ministries of Housing and Urban Development and Roads and Transportation were merged.

Companies and organizations, such as Iran Air, I.R. Iran Railways, and Iran's Ports and Maritime Organization (PMO) function under the supervision of the Ministry of Roads and Urban Development.

The ministry follows a set of objectives and missions in the transport, urban development and housing sectors. These include, but are not limited to: formulating and implementing policies in these sectors, providing and maintaining infrastructure, creating national plans for urban development and fostering urban regeneration, coordinating efforts in the aforementioned sectors with the private sector, as well as administrative affairs on a national level.

== Departments within the ministry ==
- Housing and Construction
- Human Resource Management and Development
- Legal, Parliamentary Affairs and Provinces
- Planning and Resource Management
- Transport
- Urban Planning and Architecture

== Affiliated companies and organizations of the ministry ==
- Ports and Maritime Organization (PMO)
- Iran Railway Company
- Civil Aviation Organization
- Islamic Republic of Iran's Airline (Iran Air)
- Iran's Airports and Air Navigation Company
- Executive Organization for Public and Government Buildings and Infrastructure
- Iran's New Towns Development Corporate Holding Company
- Roads, Housing and Urban Planning Research Center
- Iran's Roads Maintenance and Transportation Organization
- Iran’s Meteorological Organization
- Technical and Soil Mechanics Laboratory Company
- Construction and Development of Transport Infrastructures Company
- Housing Foundation of Islamic Revolution
- National Land and Housing Organization
- Iran's Urban Regeneration Corporate Holding Company

== Ministers of roads and urban development ==
- Farzaneh Sadegh (21 August 2024 – Present)
- Mehrdad Bazrpash (7 December 2022 – 21 August 2024)
- Shahriar Afandizadeh (22 November 2022 – 7 December 2022) (Acting)
- Rostam Ghasemi (25 August 2021 – 22 November 2022)
- Mohammad Eslami (20 October 2018 – 25 August 2021)
- Abbas Ahmad Akhoundi (15 August 2013 – 20 October 2018)
- Ali Nikzad (27 June 2011 – 15 August 2013)

== Ministers of roads and transportation ==
- Hamid Behbahani (August 5, 2008 – February 1, 2011)
- Mohammad Rahmati (February 2, 2005 – July 12, 2008)
- Ahmad Khorram (August 22, 2001 – October 3, 2004)
- Rahman Dadman (January 14, 2001 – May 17, 2001)
- Mahmoud Hojjati (August 20, 1997 – January 14, 2001)
- Akbar Torkan (August 16, 1993 – August 20, 1997)
- Mohammad Saeedikia (1985–1993)
- Mohammad Hadi Nezhad Hosseinian (1981–1985)
- Mousa Kalantari (1980–1981)
- Yousef Taheri (1979–1980)

== Ministers of housing and urban development ==
- Ali Nikzad (2009–2011)
- Mohammad Saeedikia (2005–2009)
- Ali Abdolalizadeh (1997–2005)
- Abbas Ahmad Akhoundi (1993–1997)
- Serajedin Kazerooni (1984–1993)
- Mir-Hossein Mousavi (acting) (1983–1984)
- Mohammad Shahab Gonabadi (1980–1983)
- Mohsen Yahyavi (1979–1980)
- Mostafa Katiraei (1979)

== History ==
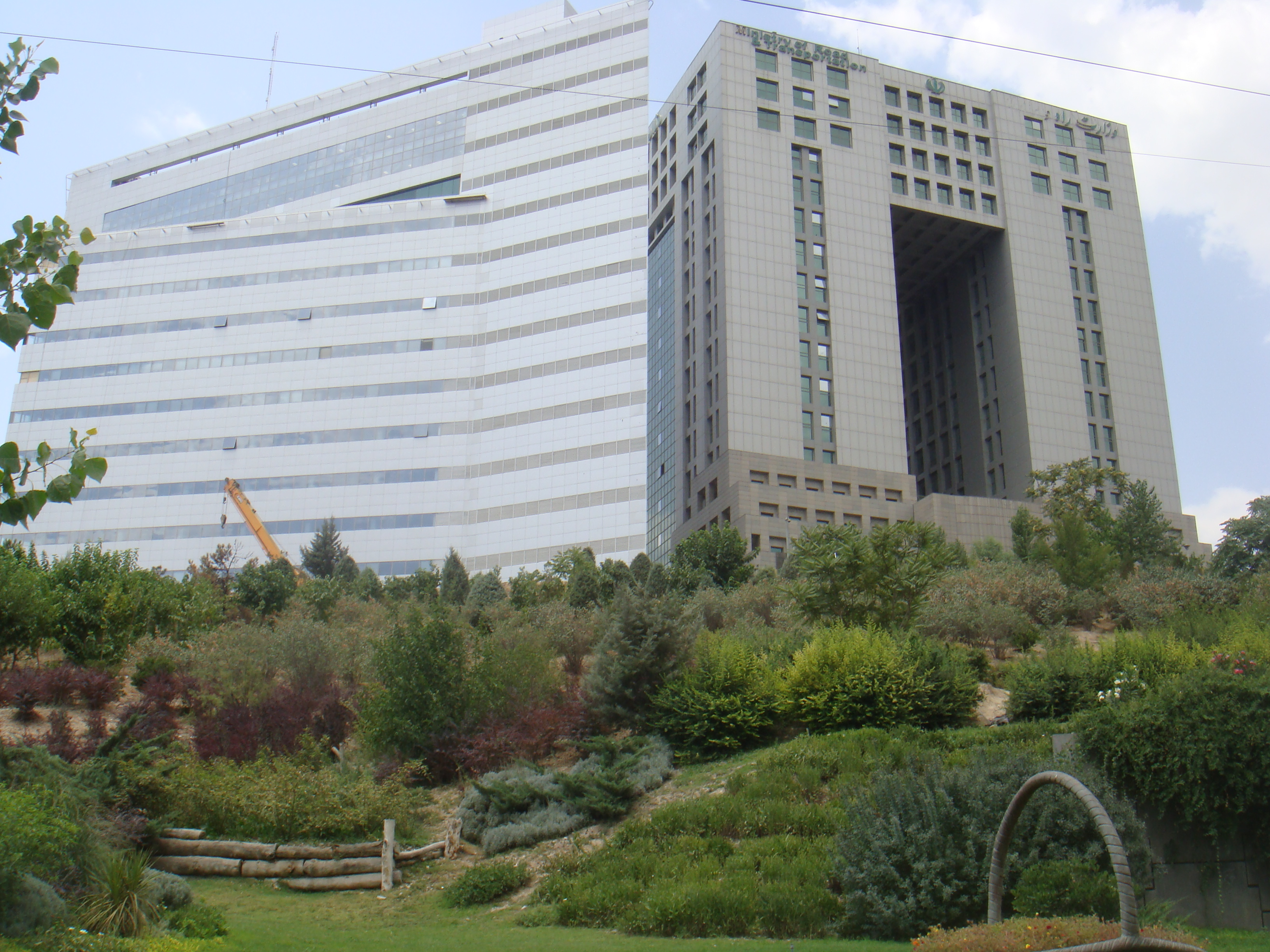
The building of Ministry of Roads and Transportation in Tehran (35°42′22.94″N 51°24′39.13″E)

The ministry was founded in 1877 as the Ministry of Public Benefits at the time of Naseredin Shah. The ministry was responsible for roads and bridge construction as well as their maintenance. After the formation of General Bureau of Roads in 1922, it was renamed as Ministry of Ways by a Parliamentary law in 1929. Later in 1936 Parliament passed a law to call it the Ministry of Roads, and again on July 6, 1974, it was renamed as Ministry of Roads and Transportation.

=== Ministry of Roads and Transportation ===
Ministry of Roads and Transportation
- وزارت راه و ترابری

Agency overview
- Formed: 9 September 1877
- Dissolved: 27 June 2011
- Superseding agency: Ministry of Transportation and Housing
- Jurisdiction: Islamic Republic of Iran
- Headquarters: Tehran, Iran
- Website: Official website

The Ministry of Roads and Transportation of Iran (Persian: وزارت راه و ترابری) was the main organ of the Government of Iran responsible for administration of roadway, railway, airway, and seaway transport inside the country and transport connections between Iran and other countries. The last acting minister was Ali Nikzad. The ministry consisted of five deputies as:

- Deputy for Development of Management Resources
- Deputy for Parliamentary Affairs & Provinces Coordination
- Deputy for Education, Research & Technology
- Deputy for Planning & Transport Economy
- Deputy for Construction & Maintenance of Rural Roads

In June 2011, Ministry of Housing and Urban Development and the Ministry of Roads and Transportation were merged into what was then called the Ministry of Transportation and Housing.

== See also ==
- Construction industry of Iran
- Transport in Iran
- International Rankings of Iran in Transport
- Airlines of Iran
- Cabinet of Iran
- Government of Iran
